= 2024 UC Davis Aggies football team =

American college football season

2024 UC Davis Aggies football

NCAA Division I Quarterfinals, L 21–35 at South Dakota
- Conference: Big Sky Conference

Ranking
- STATS: No. 5
- FCS Coaches: No. 5
- Record: 11–3 (7–1 Big Sky)
- Head coach: Tim Plough (1st season)
- Offensive coordinator: Paul Shelton (1st season)
- Defensive coordinator: Matt Coombs (5th season)
- Home stadium: UC Davis Health Stadium

2024 Big Sky Conference football standings
	Conf.			Overall
Team	W		L	W		L
No. 2 Montana State $^	8	–	0	15	–	1
No. 5 UC Davis ^	7	–	1	11	–	3
No. 7 Idaho ^	6	–	2	10	–	4
No. 22 Northern Arizona ^	6	–	2	8	–	5
No. 10 Montana ^	5	–	3	9	–	5
Idaho State	3	–	5	5	–	7
Eastern Washington	3	–	5	4	–	8
Weber State	3	–	5	4	–	8
Portland State	3	–	5	3	–	8
Cal Poly	2	–	6	3	–	8
Sacramento State	1	–	7	3	–	9
Northern Colorado	1	–	7	1	–	11
$ – Conference champion; ^ – FCS playoff participant; Rankings from STATS Poll

The 2024 UC Davis Aggies football team represented the University of California, Davis during the 2024 NCAA Division I FCS football season as a member of the Big Sky Conference. They were led by first-year head coach Tim Plough and played their home games at UC Davis Health Stadium in Davis, California. It was the Aggies 106th season overall and 13th in tbe Big Sky.

UC Davis finished the regular season 10-3 and received a bye during the first week of the FCS Playoffs due to their No.5 ranking in the end season polls. They then defeated the No. 11 Illinois State in the NCAA Division I Second Round. Following their victory over Illinois State, UC Davis would fall to No.4 South Dakota in the quarterfinals.

The Aggies averaged 10,559 fans per home game, a new average attendance record. The Aggies also finished 5th in both polls, their highest ever in Division I-AA up until that point and surpassing the previous high of 7th in 2018

== Preseason ==
=== Coaching staff changes ===
On November 28, 2023, head coach Dan Hawkins resigned from the position after seven seasons in charge, staying on the staff as a special assistant.

On December 1, 2023, Tim Plough, the tight ends coach at California, was hired as the 18th head coach in UC Davis program history.

=== Transfer portal ===
Two UC Davis players elected to enter the NCAA transfer portal during or after the 2023 season. Over the off-season, UC Davis added three players from the transfer portal.

Departing transfers
Name	No.	Pos.	Height	Weight	Year	Hometown	New school	Ref
Teddye Buchanan	15	LB	6'2	237	Junior	San Francisco, CA	California	
Chubba Ma'ae	92	DL	6'2	347	Junior	Long Beach, CA	Arizona	

Incoming transfers
Name	No.	Pos.	Height	Weight	Year	Hometown	Transfer from	Ref
Tyson McWilliams	11	DB	6'2	185	Redshirt Junior	San Diego, CA	California	
Blake Antzoulatos	32	DB	6'1	230	Redshirt Senior	Simi Valley, CA	California	
Thomas Mirabella	62	OL	6'4	305	Redshirt Senior	Mission Viejo, CA	San Diego State	

== Schedule ==
Date	Time	Opponent	Rank	Site	TV	Result	Attendance
August 31	2:00 p.m.	at California*	No. 18	California Memorial Stadium; Berkeley, CA	ACCNX/ESPN+	L 13–31	32,275
September 7	7:00 p.m.	Texas A&M–Commerce (Note: On November 7, 2024, Texas A&M University–Commerce changed its name to East Texas A&M University.)*	No. 18	UC Davis Health Stadium; Davis, CA	ESPN+	W 36–22	8,743
September 14	5:00 p.m.	at Southern Utah*	No. 15	Eccles Coliseum; Cedar City, UT	ESPN+	W 24–21	5,013
September 21	7:00 p.m.	Utah Tech*	No. 13	UC Davis Health Stadium; Davis, CA	ESPN+	W 32–14	14,832
September 28	7:00 p.m.	No. 4 Idaho	No. 14	UC Davis Health Stadium; Davis, CA	ESPN+	W 28–26	8,921
October 5	1:00 p.m.	at Portland State	No. 9	Hillsboro Stadium; Hillsboro, OR	ESPN+	W 27–26	2,519
October 12	4:00 p.m.	Cal Poly^{†}	No. 6	UC Davis Health Stadium; Davis, CA (Battle for the Golden Horseshoe)	ESPN+	W 56–10	10,515
October 19	4:00 p.m.	at Eastern Washington	No. 6	Roos Field; Cheney, WA	ESPN+	W 48–38	7,419
November 2	1:00 p.m.	Northern Colorado	No. 4	UC Davis Health Stadium; Davis, CA	ESPN+	W 59–7	10,638
November 9	7:15 p.m.	at No. 7 Montana	No. 4	Washington-Grizzly Stadium; Missoula, MT	ESPN2	W 30–14	26,012
November 16	5:00 p.m.	No. 2 Montana State	No. 4	UC Davis Health Stadium; Davis, CA	ESPN+	L 28–30	13,947
November 23	2:00 p.m.	at Sacramento State	No. 5	Hornet Stadium; Sacramento, CA (Causeway Classic)	ESPN+	W 42–39	16,239
December 7	1:00 p.m.	No. 11 Illinois State*	No. 5	UC Davis Health Stadium; Davis, CA (NCAA Division I Second Round)	ESPN+	W 42–10	6,317
December 14	12:00 p.m.	No. 4 South Dakota*	No. 5	DakotaDome; Vermillion, SD (NCAA Division I Quarterfinal)	ESPN+	L 21–35	6,135
*Non-conference game; ^{†}Homecoming; Rankings from STATS Poll released prior to the game; All times are in Pacific time; Source:

== Game summaries ==
=== at California (FBS) ===
Game One – No. 18 UC Davis Aggies (0–0) at California Golden Bears (FBS) (0–0) – Game summary

Quarter	1	2	3	4	Total
No. 18 Aggies	6	7	0	0	13
Golden Bears (FBS)	7	7	10	7	31

at California Memorial Stadium • Berkeley, CA

- Date: Saturday August 31, 2024
- Game time: 2:00 p.m. PDT
- Game weather: Temperature: 69 °F (21 °C) • Wind: SW at 9 miles per hour (14 km/h) • Weather: Sunny
- Game attendance: 32,275
- Referee: Justin Elliott
- TV announcers (ACCNX/ESPN+): Roxy Bernstein (play-by-play), Craig Haubert (analyst), Sherree Burruss (sideline)

Game information

First quarter

- (6:23) CAL – Jaydn Ott 1-yard run, Ryan Coe kick (Drive: 8 plays, 71 yards, 3:23; California 7–0)
- (0:16) UCD – Porter Connors 6-yard fumble recovery (California 7–6)

Second quarter

- (4:42) UCD – Lan Larison 1-yard run, Hunter Ridley kick (Drive: 9 plays, 66 yards, 5:02; UC Davis 13–7)
- (4:31) CAL – Nohl Williams 80-yard kickoff return, Ryan Coe kick (California 14–13)

Third quarter

- (7:18) CAL – Jaydn Ott 6-yard run, Ryan Coe kick (Drive: 10 plays, 55 yards, 3:53; California 21–13)
- (2:14) CAL – Ryan Coe 25-yard field goal (Drive: 10 plays, 52 yards, 4:08; California 24–13)

Fourth quarter

- (14:15) CAL – Nyziah Hunter 3-yard pass from Fernando Mendoza, Ryan Coe kick (Drive: 6 plays, 29 yards, 2:47; California 31–13)

Statistics	UCD	CAL
First downs	20	16
Total yards	304	281
Rushing yards	83	102
Passing yards	221	179
Passing: Comp–Att–Int	24–48–3	18–28–0
Time of possession	30:16	29:44

Team	Category	Player	Statistics
UC Davis	Passing	Miles Hastings	24/48, 221 yards, 3 INT
UC Davis	Rushing	Lan Larison	17 carries, 62 yards, TD
UC Davis	Receiving	C. J. Hutton	7 receptions, 68 yards
California	Passing	Fernando Mendoza	15/22, 158 yards, TD
California	Rushing	Jaydn Ott	14 carries, 49 yards, 2 TD
California	Receiving	Nyziah Hunter	4 receptions, 47 yards, TD

=== vs. Texas A&M–Commerce ===
Game Two – Texas A&M–Commerce Lions (0–1) vs No. 18 UC Davis Aggies (0–1) – Game summary

Quarter	1	2	3	4	Total
Lions	0	0	7	15	22
No. 18 Aggies	0	9	13	14	36

at UC Davis Health Stadium • Davis, CA

- Date: Saturday September 7, 2024
- Game time: 7:00 PM PDT
- Game weather: Clear, 87 °F (31 °C)
- Game attendance: 8,743
- Referee: Robert Quello
- TV announcers (ESPN+): TBD

Game information

First quarter

- No scoring plays

Second quarter

- UCD – Hunter Ridley 28-yard field goal, 7:23. Aggies 3–0. Drive: 8 plays, 43 yards, 3:20.
- UCD – Hunter Ridley 32-yard field goal, 5:44. Aggies 6–0. Drive: 6 plays, 15 yards, 1:34.
- UCD – Hunter Ridley 29-yard field goal, 0:03. Aggies 9–0. Drive: 10 plays, 68 yards, 2:14.

Third quarter

- UCD – Chaz Davis 4-yard pass from Miles Hastings (pass failed), 12:07. Aggies 15–0. Drive: 7 plays, 75 yards, 2:53.
- UCD – Samuel Gbatu Jr. 54-yard pass from Miles Hastings (Hunter Ridley kick), 11:34. Aggies 22–0. Drive: 1 play, 54 yards, 0:08.
- AMC – Sean Sallis 32-yard pass from Ron Peace (Aidan Martin kick), 4:51. Aggies 22–7. Drive: 1 play, 47 yards, 0:22.

Fourth quarter

- UCD – Winston Williams 14-yard pass from Miles Hastings (Hunter Ridley kick), 9:02. Aggies 29–7. Drive: 8 plays, 76 yards, 3:57.
- AMC – E. J. Oakmon 61-yard pass from Ron Peace (Aidan Martin kick), 7:36. Aggies 29–14. Drive: 4 plays, 66 yards, 1:19.
- AMC – Brooks Rigney 17-yard pass from Ron Peace (Ron Peace pass to Sean Sallis), 5:03. Aggies 29–22. Drive: 8 plays, 68 yards, 1:45.
- UCD – David Meyer 60-yard interception return (Hunter Ridley kick), 0:46. Aggies 36–22.

Statistics	TAMC	UCD
First downs	23	22
Total yards	448	449
Rushing yards	-9	129
Passing yards	457	320
Passing: Comp–Att–Int	29–56–2	26–41–1
Time of possession	29:54	30:06

Team	Category	Player	Statistics
Texas A&M–Commerce	Passing	Ron Peace	29/56, 457 yards, 3 TD, 2 INT
Texas A&M–Commerce	Rushing	E. J. Oakmon	8 rushes, 14 yards
Texas A&M–Commerce	Receiving	Brooks Rigney	5 receptions, 88 yards, TD
UC Davis	Passing	Miles Hastings	26/39, 320 yards, 3 TD, INT
UC Davis	Rushing	Lan Larison	28 rushes, 123 yards
UC Davis	Receiving	C. J. Hutton	6 receptions, 84 yards

=== at Southern Utah ===
Game Three – No. 15 UC Davis Aggies (1–1) vs Southern Utah Thunderbirds (1–1) – Game summary

Quarter	1	2	3	4	Total
No. 15 Aggies	3	3	18	0	24
Thunderbirds	7	7	0	7	21

at Eccles Coliseum • Cedar City, UT

- Date: Saturday September 14, 2024
- Game time: 6:00 PM MDT
- Game weather: Sunny • Temperature: 80 °F (27 °C) • Wind: N 12 miles per hour (19 km/h)
- Game attendance: 5,013
- Referee: Zach Erdmann
- TV announcers (ESPN+): Scott Marsh (play-by-play) and Scott Gordon (analyst)

Game information

First quarter

- SUU – LaCarea Pleasant-Johnson 59-yard interception (Danny King kick), 13:11. Southern Utah 7–0.
- UCD – Hunter Ridley 39-yard field goal, 4:37. Southern Utah 7–3. Drive: 11 plays, 54 yards, 8:34.

Second quarter

- SUU – Targhee Lambson 3-yard run (Danny King kick), 1:21. Southern Utah 14–3. Drive: 12 plays, 88 yards, 6:05.
- UCD – Hunter Ridley 37-yard field goal, 0:00. Southern Utah 14–6. Drive: 6 plays, 56 yards, 1:21.

Third quarter

- UCD – Winston Williams 10-yard pass from Miles Hastings (Lan Larison pass), 10:43. Tied 14–14. Drive: 7 plays, 68 yards, 3:03.
- UCD – Lan Larison 60-yard pass from Miles Hastings (Hunter Ridley kick), 8:39. UC Davis 21–14. Drive: 1 play, 60 yards, 0:13.
- UCD – Hunter Ridley 23-yard field goal, 1:45. UC Davis 24–14. Drive: 4 plays, 2 yards, 1:27.

Fourth quarter

- SUU – Targhee Lambson 2-yard run (Danny King kick), 5:13. UC Davis 24–21. Drive: 9 plays, 74 yards, 3:44.

Statistics	UCD	SUU
First downs	18	22
Total yards	355	340
Rushing yards	89	210
Passing yards	266	130
Passing: Comp–Att–Int	24–31–1	14–28–1
Time of possession	30:10	29:50

Team	Category	Player	Statistics
UC Davis	Passing	Miles Hastings	24/30, 266 yds, 2 TD, INT
UC Davis	Rushing	Lan Larison	15 rushes, 88 yds
UC Davis	Receiving	Lan Larison	7 receptions, 92 yds, TD
Southern Utah	Passing	Bronson Barron	7/15, 81 yds, INT
Southern Utah	Rushing	Targhee Lambson	24 rushes, 149 yds, 2 TD
Southern Utah	Receiving	Mark Bails Jr.	7 receptions, 45 yds

=== vs. Utah Tech ===
Game Four – Utah Tech Trailblazers (0–3) vs No. 13 UC Davis Aggies (2–1) – Game summary

Quarter	1	2	3	4	Total
Trailblazers	0	0	0	0	0
No. 13 Aggies	0	0	0	0	0

at UC Davis Health Stadium • Davis, CA

- Date: Saturday September 21, 2024
- Game time: 7:00 PM PDT
- TV announcers (ESPN+): Scott Marsh (play-by-play) and Scott Gordon (analyst)

Game information

First quarter
Second quarter
Third quarter
Fourth quarter

Statistics	UTU	UCD
First downs		
Total yards		
Rushing yards		
Passing yards		
Passing: Comp–Att–Int		
Time of possession		

Team	Category	Player	Statistics
Utah Tech	Passing		
Utah Tech	Rushing		
Utah Tech	Receiving		
UC Davis	Passing		
UC Davis	Rushing		
UC Davis	Receiving		

=== vs. No. 4 Idaho ===
Game Five – No. 4 Idaho Vandals (3–1) vs No. 14 UC Davis Aggies (3–1) – Game summary

Quarter	1	2	3	4	Total
No. 4 Vandals	14	3	0	9	26
No. 13 Aggies	7	7	14	0	28

at UC Davis Health Stadium • Davis, CA

- Date: Saturday September 28, 2024
- Game time: 7:00 PM PDT
- Game weather: Sunny • Temperature: 82 °F (28 °C)
- Game attendance: 8,921
- Referee: Kelly Holman
- TV announcers (ESPN+): Scott Marsh (play-by-play) and Scott Gordon (analyst)

Game information

First quarter

- IDHO – Emmerson Cortez-Menjivar 9-yard pass from Jack Wagner (Cameron Pope kick), 11:27. Vandals 7–0. Drive: 7 plays, 78 yards, 3:29.
- IDHO – Nate Thomas 1-yard run (Cameron Pope kick), 4:00. Vandals 14–0. Drive: 11 plays, 56 yards, 5:43.
- UCD – Chaz Davis 10-yard pass from Miles Hastings (Hunter Ridley kick), 0:43. Vandals 14–7. Drive: 10 plays, 59 yards, 3:16.

Second quarter

- UCD – Lan Larison 1-yard run (Hunter Ridley kick), 8:35. Tied 14–14. Drive: 10 plays, 66 yards, 3:30.
- IDHO – Cameron Pope 43-yard field goal, 5:17. Vandals 17–14. Drive: 7 plays, 47 yards, 3:11.

Third quarter

- UCD – Lan Larison 26-yard pass from Miles Hastings (Hunter Ridley kick), 14:18. Aggies 21–17. Drive: 2 plays, 28 yards, 0:29.
- UCD – Winston Williams 13-yard pass from Miles Hastings (Hunter Ridley kick), 1:45. Aggies 28–17. Drive: 6 plays, 54 yards, 1:48.

Fourth quarter

- IDHO – Cameron Pope 22-yard field goal, 4:28. Aggies 28–20. Drive: 13 plays, 74 yards, 3:49.
- IDHO – Emmerson Cortez-Menjivar 19-yard pass from Nick Josifek (2-point pass conversion failed), 0:44. Aggies 28–26. Drive: 11 plays, 88 yards, 1:38.

Statistics	IDHO	UCD
First downs	28	20
Total yards	459	312
Rushing yards	185	26
Passing yards	274	286
Passing: Comp–Att–Int	22–45–3	28–35–0
Time of possession	32:19	27:41

Team	Category	Player	Statistics
Idaho	Passing	Jack Wagner	13/25, 178 yards, TD, 2 INT
Idaho	Rushing	Elisha Cummings	11 carries, 72 yards
Idaho	Receiving	Jordan Dwyer	8 receptions, 114 yards
UC Davis	Passing	Miles Hastings	25/32, 248 yards, 3 TD
UC Davis	Rushing	Lan Larison	18 carries, 46 yards, TD
UC Davis	Receiving	Lan Larison	4 receptions, 54 yards, TD

=== at Portland State ===
Game Six – No. 8 UC Davis (4–1) at Portland State Vikings (0–4) – Game summary

Quarter	1	2	3	4	Total
No. 8 Aggies	0	0	0	0	0
Vikings	0	0	0	0	0

at Hillsboro Stadium • Hillsboro, OR

- Date: Saturday October 5, 2024
- Game time: 1:00 PM PDT
- Game weather: 0 °F (−18 °C)
- TV announcers (ESPN+): Matt Richert (play-by-play) and Scott Hermo (analyst)

Game information

First quarter
Second quarter
Third quarter
Fourth quarter

Statistics	UCD	PRST
First downs		
Total yards		
Rushing yards		
Passing yards		
Passing: Comp–Att–Int		
Time of possession		

Team	Category	Player	Statistics
UC Davis	Passing		
UC Davis	Rushing		
UC Davis	Receiving		
Portland State	Passing		
Portland State	Rushing		
Portland State	Receiving		

=== vs. Cal Poly (Battle for the Golden Horseshoe) ===
Game Seven – Cal Poly Mustangs (2–3) vs No. 6 UC Davis Aggies (5–1) – Game summary

Quarter	1	2	3	4	Total
Mustangs	0	0	0	0	0
No. 6 Aggies	0	0	0	0	0

at UC Davis Health Stadium • Davis, CA

- Date: Saturday October 12, 2024
- Game time: 4:00 PM PDT
- TV announcers (ESPN+): Scott Marsh (play-by-play) and Scott Gordon (analyst)

Game information

First quarter
Second quarter
Third quarter
Fourth quarter

Statistics	CP	UCD
First downs		
Total yards		
Rushing yards		
Passing yards		
Passing: Comp–Att–Int		
Time of possession		

Team	Category	Player	Statistics
Cal Poly	Passing		
Cal Poly	Rushing		
Cal Poly	Receiving		
UC Davis	Passing		
UC Davis	Rushing		
UC Davis	Receiving		

=== at Eastern Washington ===
Game Eight – No. 6 UC Davis (6–1) at Eastern Washington Eagles (2–4) – Game summary

Quarter	1	2	3	4	Total
No. 6 Aggies	0	28	3	17	48
Eagles	3	6	12	17	38

at Roos Field • Cheney, WA

- Date: Saturday October 19, 2024
- Game time: 4:00 PM PDT
- Game weather: Cloudy • Temperature: 64 °F (18 °C) • Wind: SW 17 miles per hour (27 km/h)
- Game attendance: 7,419
- Referee: Jeff Rink
- TV announcers (ESPN+): Austin Getz (play-by-play) and Bill Ames (analyst)

Game information

First quarter
Second quarter
Third quarter
Fourth quarter

Statistics	UCD	EWU
First downs	26	18
Total yards	549	402
Rushing yards	220	81
Passing yards	329	321
Passing: Comp–Att–Int	18–28–0	31–43–0
Time of possession	27:25	32:35

Team	Category	Player	Statistics
UC Davis	Passing	Miles Hastings	18/28, 329 yards, 4 TD
UC Davis	Rushing	Lan Larison	29 carries, 182 yards, TD
UC Davis	Receiving	Samuel Gbatu Jr.	4 receptions, 134 yards, 2 TD
Eastern Washington	Passing	Kekoa Visperas	30/42, 319 yards. 2 TD
Eastern Washington	Rushing	Kekoa Visperas	14 carries, 37 yards, 2 TD
Eastern Washington	Receiving	Efton Chism III	15 receptions, 170 yards, 2 TD

=== vs. Northern Colorado ===
Game Nine – Northern Colorado Bears (1–7) vs No. 4 UC Davis Aggies (7–1) – Game summary

Quarter	1	2	3	4	Total
Bears	0	0	0	0	0
No. 4 Aggies	0	0	0	0	0

at UC Davis Health Stadium • Davis, CA

- Date: Saturday November 2, 2024
- Game time: 1:00 p.m. PDT
- TV announcers (ESPN+): Scott Marsh (play-by-play) and Scott Gordon (analyst)

Game information

First quarter
Second quarter
Third quarter
Fourth quarter

Statistics	UNCO	UCD
First downs		
Total yards		
Rushing yards		
Passing yards		
Passing: Comp–Att–Int		
Time of possession		

Team	Category	Player	Statistics
Northern Colorado	Passing		
Northern Colorado	Rushing		
Northern Colorado	Receiving		
UC Davis	Passing		
UC Davis	Rushing		
UC Davis	Receiving		

=== at No. 7 Montana ===
Game Ten – No. 4 UC Davis Aggies (8–1) at No. 7 Montana Grizzlies (7–2) – Game summary

Quarter	1	2	3	4	Total
No. 4 Aggies	0	0	0	0	0
No. 7 Grizzlies	0	0	0	0	0

at Washington-Grizzly Stadium • Missoula, MT

- Date: Saturday November 9, 2024
- Game time: 8:15 PM MST
- Game weather: 0 °F (−18 °C)
- TV announcers (ESPN2): Jay Alter (play-by-play) and Rocky Boiman (analyst)

Game information

First quarter
Second quarter
Third quarter
Fourth quarter

Statistics	UCD	MONT
First downs		
Total yards		
Rushing yards		
Passing yards		
Passing: Comp–Att–Int		
Time of possession		

Team	Category	Player	Statistics
UC Davis	Passing		
UC Davis	Rushing		
UC Davis	Receiving		
Montana	Passing		
Montana	Rushing		
Montana	Receiving		

=== vs. No. 2 Montana State ===
Game Eleven – No. 2 Montana State Bobcats (10–0) at No. 4 UC Davis Aggies (9–1) – Game summary

Quarter	1	2	3	4	Total
No. 2 Bobcats	7	16	7	0	30
No. 4 Aggies	8	0	0	20	28

at UC Davis Health Stadium • Davis, CA

- Date: Saturday November 16, 2024
- Game time: 5:00 PM PST
- Game weather: Sunny
- Game attendance: 13,947
- Referee: Robert Quello
- TV announcers (ESPN+): Ben Creighton (play-by-play) and Ty Gregorak (analyst)

Game information

First quarter

- (8:11) UCD - Ian Simpson 1-yard pass from Miles Hastings (Winston Williams run for 2-point conversion) (UC Davis 8-0)
- (5:24) MTST - Rohan Jones 53-yard pass from Tommy Mellott (Myles Sansted kick) (UC Davis 8-7)

Second quarter

- (14:19) MTST - Ty McCullouch 17-yard pass from Tommy Mellott (Myles Sansted kick) (Montana State 14-8)
- (12:43) MTST - Taco Dowler 79-yard punt return (PAT blocked) (Montana State 20-8)
- (2:00) MTST - Myles Sansted 42-yard field goal (Montana State 23-8)

Third quarter

- (10:22) MTST - Julius Davis 7-yard run (Myles Sansted kick) (Montana State 30-8)

Fourth quarter

- (6:21) UCD - Lan Larison 1-yard run (Hunter Ridley kick) (Montana State 30-15)
- (1:45) UCD - Samuel Gbatu Jr. 4-yard pass from Miles Hastings (Hunter Ridley kick) (Montana State 30-22)
- (0:34) UCD - Chaz Davis 11-yard pass from Miles Hastings (2-point conversion failed) (Montana State 30-28)

Statistics	MTST	UCD
First downs	16	21
Total yards	333	416
Rushing yards	159	92
Passing yards	174	324
Passing: Comp–Att–Int	18–25–0	23–34–1
Time of possession	33:17	26:43

Team	Category	Player	Statistics
Montana State	Passing	Tommy Mellott	18/25, 174 yards, 2 TD
Montana State	Rushing	Julius Davis	13 carries, 91 yards, TD
Montana State	Receiving	Rohan Jones	3 receptions, 58 yards, TD
UC Davis	Passing	Miles Hastings	22/33, 320 yards, 3 TD, INT
UC Davis	Rushing	Lan Larison	23 carries, 112 yards, TD
UC Davis	Receiving	Chaz Davis	4 receptions, 128 yards, TD

=== at Sacramento State (Causeway Classic) ===
Game Twelve – No. 5 UC Davis Aggies (9–2) at Sacramento State Hornets (3–8) – Game summary

Quarter	1	2	3	4	Total
No. 5 Aggies	0	0	0	0	0
Hornets	0	0	0	0	0

at Hornet Stadium • Sacramento, CA

- Date: Saturday November 23, 2024
- Game time: 2:00 PM PST
- Game weather: 0 °F (−18 °C)
- TV announcers (ESPN+): Jason Ross (play-by-play) and Darren Arbet (analyst)

Game information

First quarter
Second quarter
Third quarter
Fourth quarter

Statistics	UCD	SAC
First downs		
Total yards		
Rushing yards		
Passing yards		
Passing: Comp–Att–Int		
Time of possession		

Team	Category	Player	Statistics
UC Davis	Passing		
UC Davis	Rushing		
UC Davis	Receiving		
Sacramento State	Passing		
Sacramento State	Rushing		
Sacramento State	Receiving		

=== vs. No. 11 Illinois State (FCS Playoffs - Second Round) ===
Game Thirteen – No. 11 Illinois State Redbirds (10-3) vs No. 5 UC Davis Aggies (10–2) – Game summary

Quarter	1	2	3	4	Total
No. 11 Redbirds	0	0	0	0	0
No. 5 Aggies	0	0	0	0	0

at UC Davis Health Stadium • Davis, CA

- Date: Saturday December 7, 2024
- Game time: 1:00 PM PDT
- Game weather: 60 °F (16 °C)
- TV announcers (ESPN+): TBD

Game information

First quarter
Second quarter
Third quarter
Fourth quarter

Statistics	ILLST	UCD
First downs		
Total yards		
Rushing yards		
Passing yards		
Passing: Comp–Att–Int		
Time of possession		

Team	Category	Player	Statistics
Illinois State	Passing		
Illinois State	Rushing		
Illinois State	Receiving		
UC Davis	Passing		
UC Davis	Rushing		
UC Davis	Receiving		

=== at No. 4 South Dakota (FCS Playoffs - Quarterfinal) ===
Game Fourteen – No. 5 UC Davis Aggies (11–2) vs No. 4 South Dakota Coyotes (10–2) – Game summary

Quarter	1	2	3	4	Total
No. 5 Aggies	7	7	0	7	21
No. 4 Coyotes	14	7	7	7	35

at DakotaDome • Vermillion, SD

- Date: Saturday December 14, 2024
- Game time: 12:00 PM PDT
- Game attendance: 6,135
- TV: ESPN+

Game information

First quarter
Second quarter
Third quarter
Fourth quarter

Statistics	UCD	SDAK
First downs		
Total yards		
Rushing yards		
Passing yards		
Passing: Comp–Att–Int		
Time of possession		

Team	Category	Player	Statistics
UC Davis	Passing		
UC Davis	Rushing		
UC Davis	Receiving		
South Dakota	Passing		
South Dakota	Rushing		
South Dakota	Receiving		
