= 2024 Portland State Vikings football team =

American college football season

2024 Portland State Vikings football
- Conference: Big Sky Conference
- Record: 3–8 (3–5 Big Sky)
- Head coach: Bruce Barnum (10th season)
- Offensive coordinator: A. C. Patterson (2nd season)
- Offensive scheme: West Coast
- Co-defensive coordinators: Colin Fry (2nd season); Mark Rhea (2nd season)
- Base defense: 4–3
- Home stadium: Hillsboro Stadium

2024 Big Sky Conference football standings
	Conf.			Overall
Team	W		L	W		L
No. 2 Montana State $^	8	–	0	15	–	1
No. 5 UC Davis ^	7	–	1	11	–	3
No. 7 Idaho ^	6	–	2	10	–	4
No. 22 Northern Arizona ^	6	–	2	8	–	5
No. 10 Montana ^	5	–	3	9	–	5
Idaho State	3	–	5	5	–	7
Eastern Washington	3	–	5	4	–	8
Weber State	3	–	5	4	–	8
Portland State	3	–	5	3	–	8
Cal Poly	2	–	6	3	–	8
Sacramento State	1	–	7	3	–	9
Northern Colorado	1	–	7	1	–	11
$ – Conference champion; ^ – FCS playoff participant; Rankings from STATS Poll

The 2024 Portland State Vikings football team represented Portland State University as a member of the Big Sky Conference during the 2024 NCAA Division I FCS football season. The Vikings were coached by tenth-year head coach Bruce Barnum and played at Hillsboro Stadium in Hillsboro, Oregon.

== Schedule ==
Date	Time	Opponent	Site	TV	Result	Attendance
August 31	12:00 p.m.	at Washington State*	Martin Stadium; Pullman, WA	The CW	L 30–70	20,089
September 7	5:00 p.m.	at No. 24 Weber State	Stewart Stadium; Ogden, UT	ESPN+	L 16–43	8,463
September 14	1:00 p.m.	No. 6 South Dakota*	Hillsboro Stadium; Hillsboro, OR	ESPN+	Canceled	
September 21	6:45 p.m.	at Boise State*	Albertsons Stadium; Boise, ID	FS1	L 14–56	36,972
September 28	4:00 p.m.	at Chattanooga*	Finley Stadium; Chattanooga, TN	ESPN+	L 30–45	6,023
October 5	1:00 p.m.	No. 8 UC Davis	Hillsboro Stadium; Hillsboro, OR	ESPN+	L 26–27	2,519
October 12	3:00 p.m.	at Idaho State	ICCU Dome; Pocatello, ID	ESPN+	W 42–38	5,618
October 19	1:00 p.m.	No. 3 Montana State	Hillsboro Stadium; Hillsboro, OR	ESPN+	L 14–44	3,121
November 2	6:00 p.m.	at Sacramento State	Hornet Stadium; Sacramento, CA	ESPN+	W 58–38	11,055
November 9	1:00 p.m.	No. 9 Idaho	Hillsboro Stadium; Hillsboro, OR	ESPN+	L 30–39	2,581
November 16	12:00 p.m.	at No. 10 Montana	Washington–Grizzly Stadium; Missoula, MT	ESPN+	L 17–28	24,773
November 23	1:00 p.m.	Northern Colorado	Hillsboro Stadium; Hillsboro, OR	ESPN+	W 45–13	1,791
*Non-conference game; Rankings from STATS Poll released prior to the game; All times are in Pacific time

== Game summaries ==
=== at Washington State (FBS) ===
Game One – Portland State Vikings (0–0) vs Washington State Cougars (FBS) (0–0) – Game summary

Quarter	1	2	3	4	Total
Vikings	7	10	6	7	30
Cougars (FBS)	22	27	14	7	70

at Martin Stadium • Pullman, WA

- Date: Saturday August 31, 2024
- Game time: 12:00 PM PST
- Game weather: Sunny
- Game attendance: 20,089
- TV announcers (The CW): Ted Robinson (play-by-play), Ryan Leaf (analyst), and Nigel Burton (sideline)

Game information

First quarter

- PRST – Dante Chachere 5-yard run (Mathias Uribe kick), 12:17. Vikings 7–0. Drive: 5 plays, 65 yards, 1:44.
- WSU – Kris Hutson 30-yard pass from John Mateer (Dean Janikowski kick), 10:06. Cougars 7–7. Drive: 8 plays, 75 yards, 2:11.
- WSU – Tre Shackelford 39-yard pass from John Mateer (Dean Janikowski kick), 4:49. Cougars 14–7. Drive: 6 plays, 75 yards, 3:04.
- WSU – Kyle Williams 58-yard pass from John Mateer (Billy Riviere III run for two-point conversion), 3:07. Cougars 22–7. Drive: 1 plays, 58 yards, 0:04.

Second quarter

- PRST – Matias Uribe 43-yard field goal, 14:55. Cougars 22–10. Drive: 8 plays, 49 yards, 3:12.
- WSU – Wayshawn Parker 54-yard run (Dean Janikowski kick), 13:39. Cougars 29–10. Drive: 4 plays, 75 yards, 1:16.
- WSU – Wayshawn Parker 4-yard pass from John Mateer (Dean Janikowski kick), 10:28. Cougars 36–10. Drive: 4 plays, 68 yards, 1:19.
- WSU – Stephen Hall 100-yard interception return (pass failed), 2:36. Cougars 42–10. Drive: 14 plays, 71 yards, 7:52.
- WSU – John Mateer 40-yard run (Dean Janikowski kick), 1:30. Cougars 49–10. Drive: 2 plays, 47 yards, 0:12.
- PRST – Branden Alvarez 10-yard pass from William Haskell (Matias Uribe kick), 0:08. Cougars 49–17. Drive: 8 plays, 75 yards, 1:22.

Third quarter

- WSU – Djouvensky Schlenbaker 11-yard run (Dean Janikowski kick), 12:17. Cougars 56–17. Drive: 2 plays, 70 yards, 0:28.
- WSU – Kyle Williams 59-yard pass from John Mateer (Dean Janikowski kick), 9:47. Cougars 63–17. Drive: 2 plays, 64 yards, 0:46.
- PRST – Eric Denham 40-yard pass from Dante Chachere (run failed), 7:53. Cougars 63–23. Drive: 4 plays, 75 yards, 1:57.

Fourth quarter

- WSU – Trey Leckner 33-yard pass from Zevi Eckhaus (Dean Janikowski kick), 13:32. Cougars 70–23. Drive: 11 plays, 92 yards, 4:31.
- PRST – Dante Chachere 4-yard run (Matias Uribe kick), 4:35. Cougars 70–30. Drive: 14 plays, 75 yards, 8:57.

Statistics	PRST	WSU
First downs	21	21
Total yards	449	637
Rushing yards	215	224
Passing yards	234	413
Passing: Comp–Att–Int	20-35-1	17-24-0
Time of possession	40:26	19:34

Team	Category	Player	Statistics
Portland State	Passing	Dante Chachere	14/25, 175 yards, TD, INT
Portland State	Rushing	Delon Thompson	15 carries, 96 yards
Portland State	Receiving	Tanner Beaman	3 receptions, 42 yards
Washington State	Passing	John Mateer	11/17, 352 yards, 5 TD
Washington State	Rushing	Wayshawn Parker	8 carries, 96 yards, TD
Washington State	Receiving	Kyle Williams	4 receptions, 141 yards, 2 TD

=== at No. 24 Weber State ===
Game Two – Portland State Vikings (0–1) vs No. 24 Weber State Wildcats (0–1) – Game summary

Quarter	1	2	3	4	Total
Vikings	0	0	0	0	0
No. 24 Wildcats	0	0	0	0	0

at Stewart Stadium • Ogden, UT

- Date: Saturday September 7, 2024
- Game time: 5:00 PM PST
- Game weather: 0 °F (−18 °C)
- TV announcers (ESPN+): TBD

Game information

First quarter
Second quarter
Third quarter
Fourth quarter

Statistics	PRST	WEB
First downs		
Total yards		
Rushing yards		
Passing yards		
Passing: Comp–Att–Int		
Time of possession		

Team	Category	Player	Statistics
Portland State	Passing		
Portland State	Rushing		
Portland State	Receiving		
Weber State	Passing		
Weber State	Rushing		
Weber State	Receiving		

=== vs. No. 6 South Dakota ===
Game Three – No. 6 South Dakota Coyotes (1–1) at Portland State Vikings (0–2) – Game summary

Quarter	1	2	3	4	Total
No. 6 Coyotes	0	0	0	0	0
Vikings	0	0	0	0	0

at Hillsboro Stadium • Hillsboro, OR

- Date: Saturday September 14, 2024
- Game time: 1:00 PM PST
- Game weather: 0 °F (−18 °C)
- TV announcers (ESPN+): TBD

Game information

First quarter
Second quarter
Third quarter
Fourth quarter

Statistics	SDAK	PRST
First downs		
Total yards		
Rushing yards		
Passing yards		
Passing: Comp–Att–Int		
Time of possession		

Team	Category	Player	Statistics
South Dakota	Passing		
South Dakota	Rushing		
South Dakota	Receiving		
Portland State	Passing		
Portland State	Rushing		
Portland State	Receiving		

=== at Boise State (FBS) ===
Game Four – Portland State Vikings (0–2) vs Boise State Broncos (FBS) (1–1) – Game summary

Quarter	1	2	3	4	Total
Vikings	7	0	0	7	14
Broncos (FBS)	7	21	14	14	56

at Albertsons Stadium • Boise, ID

- Date: Saturday September 21, 2024
- Game time: 6:45 PM PST
- Game weather: Sunny, 73 °F (23 °C)
- Game attendance: 36,972
- Referee: Kenneth Ray
- TV announcers (FS1): Eric Collins (play-by-play) and Spencer Tillman (analyst)

Game information

First quarter

- (11:23) BSU - Cameron Bates 20-yard run, Jonah Dalmas kick (Drive: 3 plays, 52 yards, 1:05; Boise State 7-0)
- (5:01) PSU - Delon Thompson 0-yard run, Mathias Uribe kick (Drive: 12 plays, 73 yards, 6:14; Tied 7-7)

Second quarter

- (14:55) BSU - Matt Lauter 4-yard pass from Maddux Madsen, Jonah Dalmas kick (Drive: 4 plays, 80 yards, 1:49; Boise State 14-7)
- (4:39) BSU - Maddux Madsen 1-yard run, Jonah Dalmas kick (Drive: 9 plays, 77 yards, 4:16; Boise State 21-7)
- (0:44) BSU - Cam Camper 18-yard pass from Maddux Madsen, Jonah Dalmas kick (Drive: 6 plays, 50 yards, 2:14; Boise State 28-7)

Third quarter

- (8:09) BSU - Cam Camper 52-yard pass from Maddux Madsen, Jonah Dalmas kick (Drive: 4 plays, 64 yards, 1:50; Boise State 35-7)
- (1:58) BSU - Dylan Riley 2-yard run, Jonah Dalmas kick (Drive: 10 plays, 64 yards, 4:49; Boise State 42-7)

Fourth quarter

- (14:28) PSU - Dante Chachere 10-yard run, Mathias Uribe kick (Drive: 6 plays, 65 yards, 2:30; Boise State 42-14)
- (9:23) BSU - Tyler Crowe 6-yard run, Jonah Dalmas kick (Drive: 12 plays, 66 yards, 4:57; Boise State 49-14)
- (7:38) BSU - Dylan Riley 64-yard run, Jonah Dalmas kick (1 play, 64 yards, 0:11; Boise State 56-14)

Statistics	PRST	BSU
First downs	12	27
Total yards	277	609
Rushing yards	147	342
Passing yards	130	267
Passing: Comp–Att–Int	13–20–0	20–28–0
Time of possession	30:46	29:14

Team	Category	Player	Statistics
Portland State	Passing	Dante Chachere	12/18, 126 yards
Portland State	Rushing	Dante Chachere	13 carries, 76 yards, TD
Portland State	Receiving	Eric Denham	2 receptions, 43 yards
Boise State	Passing	Maddux Madsen	13/18, 188 yards, 3 TD
Boise State	Rushing	Ashton Jeanty	11 carries, 127 yards
Boise State	Receiving	Matt Lauter	7 receptions, 91 yards, TD

=== at Chattanooga ===
Game Five – Portland State Vikings (0–3) at Chattanooga Mocs (0–3) – Game summary

Quarter	1	2	3	4	Total
Vikings	0	0	0	0	0
Mocs	0	0	0	0	0

at Finley Stadium • Chattanooga, TN

- Date: Saturday September 28, 2024
- Game time: 6:00 p.m.
- Game weather: 0 °F (−18 °C)
- TV: ESPN+

Game information

First quarter
Second quarter
Third quarter
Fourth quarter

Statistics	PRST	UTC
First downs		
Total yards		
Rushing yards		
Passing yards		
Passing: Comp–Att–Int		
Time of possession		

Team	Category	Player	Statistics
Portland State	Passing		
Portland State	Rushing		
Portland State	Receiving		
Chattanooga	Passing		
Chattanooga	Rushing		
Chattanooga	Receiving		

=== vs. No. 8 UC Davis ===
Game Six – No. 8 UC Davis (4–1) at Portland State Vikings (0–4) – Game summary

Quarter	1	2	3	4	Total
No. 8 Aggies	0	0	0	0	0
Vikings	0	0	0	0	0

at Hillsboro Stadium • Hillsboro, OR

- Date: Saturday October 5, 2024
- Game time: 1:00 PM PST
- Game weather: 0 °F (−18 °C)
- TV announcers (ESPN+): Matt Richert (play-by-play) and Scott Hermo (analyst)

Game information

First quarter
Second quarter
Third quarter
Fourth quarter

Statistics	UCD	PRST
First downs		
Total yards		
Rushing yards		
Passing yards		
Passing: Comp–Att–Int		
Time of possession		

Team	Category	Player	Statistics
UC Davis	Passing		
UC Davis	Rushing		
UC Davis	Receiving		
Portland State	Passing		
Portland State	Rushing		
Portland State	Receiving		

=== at Idaho State ===
Game Seven – Portland State Vikings (0–5) at Idaho State Bengals (3–3) – Game summary

Quarter	1	2	3	4	Total
Vikings	0	0	0	0	0
Bengals	0	0	0	0	0

at ICCU Dome • Pocatello, ID

- Date: Saturday October 12, 2024
- Game time: 3:00 PM PST
- Game weather: None (Indoor stadium)
- TV announcers (ESPN+): TBD

Game information

First quarter
Second quarter
Third quarter
Fourth quarter

Statistics	PRST	IDST
First downs		
Total yards		
Rushing yards		
Passing yards		
Passing: Comp–Att–Int		
Time of possession		

Team	Category	Player	Statistics
Portland State	Passing		
Portland State	Rushing		
Portland State	Receiving		
Idaho State	Passing		
Idaho State	Rushing		
Idaho State	Receiving		

=== vs. No. 3 Montana State ===
Game Eight – No. 3 Montana State Bobcats (6–0) at Portland State Vikings (1–5) – Game summary

Quarter	1	2	3	4	Total
No. 3 Bobcats	7	28	6	3	44
Vikings	0	0	0	14	14

at Hillsboro Stadium • Hillsboro, OR

- Date: Saturday October 19, 2024
- Game time: 1:00 PM PST
- Game weather: Sunny • Temperature: 65 °F (18 °C) • Wind: E 3 mph
- Game attendance: 3,121
- Referee: Michael Bezner
- TV announcers (ESPN+): Ben Creighton (play-by-play), Ty Gregorak (analyst) and Grace Lawrence (sideline)

Game information

First quarter

- (10:20) MTST - Scottre Humphrey 7-yard run (Myles Sansted kick) (Montana State 7-0)

Second quarter

- (9:13) MTST - Taco Dowler 57-yard pass from Tommy Mellott (Myles Sansted kick) (Montana State 14-0)
- (5:58) MTST - Scottre Humphrey 6-yard run (Myles Sansted kick) (Montana State 21-0)
- (1:55) MTST - Jared White 24-yard pass from Tommy Mellott (Myles Sansted kick) (Montana State 28-0)
- (0:21) MTST - Rohan Jones 48-yard pass from Tommy Mellott (Myles Sansted kick) (Montana State 35-0)

Third quarter

- (7:38) MTST - Myles Sansted 28-yard field goal (Montana State 38-0)
- (0:30) MTST - Myles Sansted 25-yard field goal (Montana State 41-0)

Fourth quarter

- (11:44) PRST - Deion Thompson 9-yard run (Mathias Uribe kick) (Montana State 41-7)
- (5:12) MTST - Myles Sansted 45-yard field goal (Montana State 44-7)
- (0:32) PRST - William Haskell 12-yard run (Mathias Uribe kick) (Montana State 44-14)

Statistics	MTST	PRST
First downs	27	18
Total yards	607	235
Rushing yards	323	149
Passing yards	284	86
Passing: Comp–Att–Int	19–28–0	14–22–1
Time of possession	34:06	25:54

Team	Category	Player	Statistics
Montana State	Passing	Tommy Mellott	15/20, 239 yards, 3 TD
Montana State	Rushing	Scottre Humphrey	14 carries, 160 yards, 2 TD
Montana State	Receiving	Taco Dowler	3 receptions, 78 yards, TD
Portland State	Passing	Dante Chachere	11/18, 64 yards, INT
Portland State	Rushing	Deion Thompson	12 carries, 78 yards, TD
Portland State	Receiving	Branden Alvarez	4 receptions, 23 yards

=== at Sacramento State ===
Game Nine – Portland State Vikings (1–6) vs Sacramento State Hornets (3–5) – Game summary

Quarter	1	2	3	4	Total
Vikings	0	0	0	0	0
Hornets	0	0	0	0	0

at Hornet Stadium • Sacramento, CA

- Date: Saturday November 2, 2024
- Game time: 6:00 PM PST
- Game weather: 0 °F (−18 °C)
- TV announcers (ESPN+): Jason Ross (play-by-play) and Darren Arbet (analyst)

Game information

First quarter
Second quarter
Third quarter
Fourth quarter

Statistics	PRST	SAC
First downs		
Total yards		
Rushing yards		
Passing yards		
Passing: Comp–Att–Int		
Time of possession		

Team	Category	Player	Statistics
Portland State	Passing		
Portland State	Rushing		
Portland State	Receiving		
Sacramento State	Passing		
Sacramento State	Rushing		
Sacramento State	Receiving		

=== vs. No. 9 Idaho ===
Game Ten – No. 9 Idaho Vandals (6–3) at Portland State Vikings (2–6) – Game summary

Quarter	1	2	3	4	Total
No. 9 Vandals	0	0	0	0	0
Vikings	0	0	0	0	0

at Hillsboro Stadium • Hillsboro, OR

- Date: Saturday November 9, 2024
- Game time: 1:00 PM PST
- Game weather: 0 °F (−18 °C)
- TV announcers (ESPN+): TBD

Game information

First quarter
Second quarter
Third quarter
Fourth quarter

Statistics	IDHO	PRST
First downs		
Total yards		
Rushing yards		
Passing yards		
Passing: Comp–Att–Int		
Time of possession		

Team	Category	Player	Statistics
Idaho	Passing		
Idaho	Rushing		
Idaho	Receiving		
Portland State	Passing		
Portland State	Rushing		
Portland State	Receiving		

=== at No. 10 Montana ===
Game Eleven – Portland State Vikings (2–7) vs No. 10 Montana Grizzlies (7–3) – Game summary

Quarter	1	2	3	4	Total
Vikings	0	0	0	0	0
No. 10 Grizzlies	0	0	0	0	0

at Washington–Grizzly Stadium • Missoula, MT

- Date: Saturday November 16, 2024
- Game time: 12:00 PM PST
- Game weather: 0 °F (−18 °C)
- TV announcers (ESPN+): Jay Kohn (play-by-play), Marty Mornhinweg (analyst) and Kyle Hanson (sideline)

Game information

First quarter
Second quarter
Third quarter
Fourth quarter

Statistics	PRST	MONT
First downs		
Total yards		
Rushing yards		
Passing yards		
Passing: Comp–Att–Int		
Time of possession		

Team	Category	Player	Statistics
Portland State	Passing		
Portland State	Rushing		
Portland State	Receiving		
Montana	Passing		
Montana	Rushing		
Montana	Receiving		

=== vs. Northern Colorado ===
Game Twelve – Northern Colorado Bears (1–10) at Portland State Vikings (2–8) – Game summary

Quarter	1	2	3	4	Total
Bears	0	0	0	0	0
Vikings	0	0	0	0	0

at Hillsboro Stadium • Hillsboro, OR

- Date: Saturday November 23, 2024
- Game time: 1:00 PM PST
- Game weather: 0 °F (−18 °C)
- TV announcers (ESPN+): TBD

Game information

First quarter
Second quarter
Third quarter
Fourth quarter

Statistics	UNCO	PRST
First downs		
Total yards		
Rushing yards		
Passing yards		
Passing: Comp–Att–Int		
Time of possession		

Team	Category	Player	Statistics
Northern Colorado	Passing		
Northern Colorado	Rushing		
Northern Colorado	Receiving		
Portland State	Passing		
Portland State	Rushing		
Portland State	Receiving		
