= 2024 Montana Grizzlies football team =

American college football season

2024 Montana Grizzlies football

NCAA Division I Second Round, L 18–35 at South Dakota State
- Conference: Big Sky Conference

Ranking
- STATS: No. 10
- FCS Coaches: No. 13
- Record: 9–5 (5–3 Big Sky)
- Head coach: Bobby Hauck (14th season)
- Offensive coordinator: Brent Pease (2nd season)
- Offensive scheme: Multiple
- Co-defensive coordinators: Roger Cooper (1st season); Tim Hauck (1st season)
- Base defense: 3–3–5
- Home stadium: Washington–Grizzly Stadium

2024 Big Sky Conference football standings
| | Conf. | | | Overall |
| Team | W | | L | W | | L |
|---|---|---|---|---|---|---|
| No. 2 Montana State $^ | 8 | – | 0 | 15 | – | 1 |
| No. 5 UC Davis ^ | 7 | – | 1 | 11 | – | 3 |
| No. 7 Idaho ^ | 6 | – | 2 | 10 | – | 4 |
| No. 22 Northern Arizona ^ | 6 | – | 2 | 8 | – | 5 |
| No. 10 Montana ^ | 5 | – | 3 | 9 | – | 5 |
| Idaho State | 3 | – | 5 | 5 | – | 7 |
| Eastern Washington | 3 | – | 5 | 4 | – | 8 |
| Weber State | 3 | – | 5 | 4 | – | 8 |
| Portland State | 3 | – | 5 | 3 | – | 8 |
| Cal Poly | 2 | – | 6 | 3 | – | 8 |
| Sacramento State | 1 | – | 7 | 3 | – | 9 |
| Northern Colorado | 1 | – | 7 | 1 | – | 11 |
$ – Conference champion; ^ – FCS playoff participant; Rankings from STATS Poll

The 2024 Montana Grizzlies football team represented the University of Montana during the 2024 NCAA Division I FCS football season as a member of the Big Sky Conference. They were led by head coach Bobby Hauck in the seventh season of his current stint and the fourteenth overall, as he was head coach from 2003 to 2009. The team played their home games at Washington–Grizzly Stadium in Missoula, Montana.

== Schedule ==
| Date | Time | Opponent | Rank | Site | TV | Result | Attendance |
|---|---|---|---|---|---|---|---|
| August 31 | 7:00 p.m. | Missouri State* | No. 3 | Washington-Grizzly Stadium; Missoula, MT | KPAX/ESPN+ | W 29–24 | 26,482 |
| September 7 | 5:00 p.m. | at No. 23 North Dakota* | No. 4 | Alerus Center; Grand Forks, ND | KPAX/ESPN+ | L 24–27 | 11,595 |
| September 14 | 1:00 p.m. | Morehead State* | No. 8 | Washington-Grizzly Stadium; Missoula, MT | KPAX/ESPN+ | W 59–2 | 25,808 |
| September 21 | 1:00 p.m. | No. 24 Western Carolina* | No. 9 | Washington-Grizzly Stadium; Missoula, MT | KPAX/ESPN+ | W 46–35 | 25,720 |
| September 28 | 6:00 p.m. | at Eastern Washington | No. 8 | Roos Field; Cheney, WA | KPAX/ESPN+ | W 52–49 | 8,846 |
| October 5 | 1:00 p.m. | Weber State | No. 8 | Washington-Grizzly Stadium; Missoula, MT | KPAX/ESPN+ | L 48–55 ^{OT} | 25,888 |
| October 12 | 2:00 p.m. | No. 24 Northern Arizona^{†} | No. 14 | Washington-Grizzly Stadium; Missoula, MT | KPAX/ESPN+ | W 31–20 | 26,229 |
| October 26 | 1:00 p.m. | at Northern Colorado | No. 9 | Nottingham Field; Greeley, CO | KPAX/ESPN+ | W 24–0 | 3,902 |
| November 2 | 3:00 p.m. | at Cal Poly | No. 8 | Mustang Memorial Field; San Luis Obispo, CA | KPAX/ESPN+ | W 42–7 | 10,095 |
| November 9 | 8:15 p.m. | No. 4 UC Davis | No. 7 | Washington-Grizzly Stadium; Missoula, MT | ESPN2 | L 14–30 | 26,012 |
| November 16 | 1:00 p.m. | Portland State | No. 10 | Washington-Grizzly Stadium; Missoula, MT | KPAX/ESPN+ | W 28–17 | 24,773 |
| November 23 | 12:00 p.m. | at No. 2 Montana State | No. 9 | Bobcat Stadium; Bozeman, MT (rivalry) | KPAX/ESPN+ | L 11–34 | 22,057 |
| November 30 | 8:15 p.m. | No. 21 Tennessee State* | No. 13 | Washington-Grizzly Stadium; Missoula, MT (NCAA Division I First Round) | ESPN2 | W 41–27 | 12,479 |
| December 7 | 12:00 p.m. | at No. 2 South Dakota State* | No. 13 | Dana J. Dykhouse Stadium; Brookings, SD (NCAA Division I Second Round) | ESPN+ | L 18–35 | 10,376 |
*Non-conference game; ^{†}Homecoming; Rankings from STATS Poll released prior to the game; All times are in Mountain time; Source:

== Game summaries ==
=== Missouri State ===
Game One – Missouri State Bears (0–0) at No. 3 Montana Grizzlies (0–0) – Game summary

| Quarter | 1 | 2 | 3 | 4 | Total |
|---|---|---|---|---|---|
| Bears | 7 | 3 | 7 | 7 | 24 |
| No. 3 Grizzlies | 6 | 6 | 7 | 10 | 29 |

at Washington-Grizzly Stadium, Missoula, MT

- Date: Saturday August 31, 2024
- Game time: 7:00 p.m.
- Game attendance: 26,482
- TV announcers (ESPN+/MTN): Jay Kohn, Marty Mornhinweg, Kyle Hansen

| Statistics | MOST | MONT |
|---|---|---|
| First downs | 22 | 23 |
| Total yards | 356 | 347 |
| Rushing yards | 99 | 167 |
| Passing yards | 257 | 180 |
| Passing: Comp–Att–Int | 23-39-1 | 14-26-0 |
| Time of possession | 36:37 | 23:23 |

| Team | Category | Player | Statistics |
|---|---|---|---|
| Missouri State | Passing | Jacob Clark | 23/39, 257 yards, INT |
| Missouri State | Rushing | Jacardia Wright | 19 carries, 76 yards, TD |
| Missouri State | Receiving | Hunter Wood | 6 receptions, 70 yards |
| Montana | Passing | Logan Fife | 5/7, 90 yards, TD |
| Montana | Rushing | Eli Gillman | 15 carries, 89 yards, 2 TD |
| Montana | Receiving | Xavier Harris | 3 receptions, 69 yards, TD |

=== at No. 23 North Dakota ===
Game Two – No. 4 Montana Grizzlies (1–0) at No. 23 North Dakota Fighting Hawks (0–1) – Game summary

| Quarter | 1 | 2 | 3 | 4 | Total |
|---|---|---|---|---|---|
| No. 4 Grizzlies | 21 | 3 | 0 | 0 | 24 |
| No. 23 Fighting Hawks | 7 | 0 | 14 | 6 | 27 |

at Alerus Center • Grand Forks, ND

- Date: Saturday September 7, 2024
- Game time: 5:00 PM
- Game attendance: 11,595
- TV announcers (ESPN+/MTN/MidCo): Alex Heinert, Ryan Kasowski

| Statistics | MONT | UND |
|---|---|---|
| First downs | 16 | 25 |
| Total yards | 305 | 340 |
| Rushing yards | 160 | 243 |
| Passing yards | 145 | 97 |
| Passing: Comp–Att–Int | 21-31-0 | 11-24-1 |
| Time of possession | 22:46 | 37:14 |

| Team | Category | Player | Statistics |
|---|---|---|---|
| Montana | Passing | Keali'i Ah Yat | 21/29, 145 yards, TD |
| Montana | Rushing | Eli Gillman | 8 carries, 86 yards, TD |
| Montana | Receiving | Xavier Harris | 5 receptions, 56 yards, TD |
| North Dakota | Passing | Simon Romfo | 11/24, 97 yards, INT |
| North Dakota | Rushing | Gaven Ziebarth | 22 carries, 88 yards, TD |
| North Dakota | Receiving | Bo Belquist | 4 receptions, 33 yards |

=== Morehead State ===
Game Three – Morehead State Eagles (2–0) at No. 8 Montana Grizzlies (1–1) – Game summary

| Quarter | 1 | 2 | 3 | 4 | Total |
|---|---|---|---|---|---|
| Eagles | 0 | 0 | 2 | 0 | 2 |
| No. 8 Grizzlies | 15 | 24 | 13 | 7 | 59 |

at Washington-Grizzly Stadium, Missoula, MT

- Date: Saturday September 14, 2024
- Game time: 1:00 PM
- Game attendance: 25,808
- TV announcers (ESPN+/MTN): Jay Kohn, Marty Mornhinweg, Kyle Hansen

| Statistics | MORE | MONT |
|---|---|---|
| First downs | | |
| Total yards | | |
| Rushing yards | | |
| Passing yards | | |
| Passing: Comp–Att–Int | | |
| Time of possession | | |

| Team | Category | Player | Statistics |
|---|---|---|---|
| Morehead State | Passing | | |
| Morehead State | Rushing | | |
| Morehead State | Receiving | | |
| Montana | Passing | | |
| Montana | Rushing | | |
| Montana | Receiving | | |

=== No. 24 Western Carolina ===
Game Four – No. 9 Montana Grizzlies (2–1) at No. 24 Western Carolina Catamounts (1–2) – Game summary

| Quarter | 1 | 2 | 3 | 4 | Total |
|---|---|---|---|---|---|
| No. 24 Catamounts | 14 | 13 | 0 | 8 | 35 |
| No. 9 Grizzlies | 0 | 21 | 14 | 11 | 46 |

at Washington-Grizzly Stadium, Missoula, MT

- Date: Saturday September 21, 2024
- Game time: 1:00 PM
- Game attendance: 25,720
- TV announcers (ESPN+/MTN): Jay Kohn, Marty Mornhinweg, Kyle Hansen

| Statistics | WCU | MONT |
|---|---|---|
| First downs | | |
| Total yards | | |
| Rushing yards | | |
| Passing yards | | |
| Passing: Comp–Att–Int | | |
| Time of possession | | |

| Team | Category | Player | Statistics |
|---|---|---|---|
| Western Carolina | Passing | | |
| Western Carolina | Rushing | | |
| Western Carolina | Receiving | | |
| Montana | Passing | | |
| Montana | Rushing | | |
| Montana | Receiving | | |

=== at Eastern Washington (EWU–UM Governors Cup) ===
Game Five – No. 8 Montana Grizzlies (3–1) at Eastern Washington Eagles (1–3) – Game summary

| Quarter | 1 | 2 | 3 | 4 | Total |
|---|---|---|---|---|---|
| No. 8 Grizzlies | 10 | 21 | 7 | 14 | 52 |
| Eagles | 7 | 7 | 7 | 28 | 49 |

at Roos Field • Cheney, WA

- Date: Saturday September 28, 2024
- Game time: 6:00 PM
- Game attendance: 8,846
- TV announcers (ESPN+/MTN): Ben Creighton, Ty Gregorak, Grace Lawrence

| Statistics | MONT | EWU |
|---|---|---|
| First downs | 28 | 31 |
| Total yards | 701 | 551 |
| Rushing yards | 337 | 263 |
| Passing yards | 364 | 288 |
| Passing: Comp–Att–Int | 30-43-0 | 23-42-0 |
| Time of possession | 33:11 | 26:49 |

| Team | Category | Player | Statistics |
|---|---|---|---|
| Montana | Passing | Logan Fife | 30-42 364 Yards 5 TD |
| Montana | Rushing | Nick Ostmo | 15 Carries 160 Yards 1 TD |
| Montana | Receiving | Junior Bergen | 7 Receptions 150 Yards 1 TD |
| Eastern Washington | Passing | Kekoa Visperas | 22-38 265 Yards 4 TD |
| Eastern Washington | Rushing | Mailk Dotson | 14 Carries 77 Yards |
| Eastern Washington | Receiving | Efton Chism III | 8 Receptions 107 Yards 3 TD |

=== Weber State ===
Game Six – Weber State Wildcats (2–3) at No. 8 Montana Grizzlies (4–1) – Game summary

| Quarter | 1 | 2 | 3 | 4 | OT | Total |
|---|---|---|---|---|---|---|
| Wildcats | 14 | 14 | 3 | 17 | 7 | 55 |
| No. 8 Grizzlies | 7 | 10 | 6 | 25 | 0 | 48 |

at Washington-Grizzly Stadium, Missoula, MT

- Date: Saturday October 5, 2024
- Game time: 1:00 p.m.
- TV announcers (ESPN+/MTN/SWX NW): Jay Kohn, Marty Mornhinweg, Kyle Hansen

| Statistics | WEB | MONT |
|---|---|---|
| First downs | | |
| Total yards | | |
| Rushing yards | | |
| Passing yards | | |
| Passing: Comp–Att–Int | | |
| Time of possession | | |

| Team | Category | Player | Statistics |
|---|---|---|---|
| Weber State | Passing | | |
| Weber State | Rushing | | |
| Weber State | Receiving | | |
| Montana | Passing | | |
| Montana | Rushing | | |
| Montana | Receiving | | |

=== No. 24 Northern Arizona ===
Game Seven – No. 24 Northern Arizona Lumberjacks (3–3) at No. 14 Montana Grizzlies (4–2) – Game summary

| Quarter | 1 | 2 | 3 | 4 | Total |
|---|---|---|---|---|---|
| No. 24 Lumberjacks | 0 | 0 | 0 | 0 | 0 |
| No. 14 Grizzlies | 0 | 0 | 0 | 0 | 0 |

at Washington-Grizzly Stadium, Missoula, MT

- Date: Saturday October 12, 2024
- Game time: 2:00 p.m.
- TV announcers (ESPN+/MTN): Ben Creighton, Ty Gregorak, Grace Lawrence

| Statistics | NAU | MONT |
|---|---|---|
| First downs | | |
| Total yards | | |
| Rushing yards | | |
| Passing yards | | |
| Passing: Comp–Att–Int | | |
| Time of possession | | |

| Team | Category | Player | Statistics |
|---|---|---|---|
| Northern Arizona | Passing | | |
| Northern Arizona | Rushing | | |
| Northern Arizona | Receiving | | |
| Montana | Passing | | |
| Montana | Rushing | | |
| Montana | Receiving | | |

=== at Northern Colorado ===
Game Eight – No. 9 Montana Grizzlies (5–2) at Northern Colorado Bears (1–6) – Game summary

| Quarter | 1 | 2 | 3 | 4 | Total |
|---|---|---|---|---|---|
| No. 9 Grizzlies | 0 | 0 | 0 | 0 | 0 |
| Bears | 0 | 0 | 0 | 0 | 0 |

at Nottingham Field, Greeley, CO

- Date: Saturday October 26, 2024
- Game time: 1:00 p.m.
- TV announcers (ESPN+/MTN): Jay Kohn, Marty Mornhinweg, Kyle Hanson

| Statistics | MONT | UNCO |
|---|---|---|
| First downs | | |
| Total yards | | |
| Rushing yards | | |
| Passing yards | | |
| Passing: Comp–Att–Int | | |
| Time of possession | | |

| Team | Category | Player | Statistics |
|---|---|---|---|
| Montana | Passing | | |
| Montana | Rushing | | |
| Montana | Receiving | | |
| Northern Colorado | Passing | | |
| Northern Colorado | Rushing | | |
| Northern Colorado | Receiving | | |

=== at Cal Poly ===
Game Nine – No. 8 Montana Grizzlies (6–2) at Cal Poly Mustangs (2–5) – Game summary

| Quarter | 1 | 2 | 3 | 4 | Total |
|---|---|---|---|---|---|
| No. 8 Grizzlies | 0 | 0 | 0 | 0 | 0 |
| Mustangs | 0 | 0 | 0 | 0 | 0 |

at Mustang Memorial Field, San Luis Obispo, CA

- Date: Saturday November 2, 2024
- Game time: 3:00 p.m.
- TV announcers (ESPN+/MTN): Jay Kohn, Marty Mornhinweg, Kyle Hanson

| Statistics | MONT | CP |
|---|---|---|
| First downs | | |
| Total yards | | |
| Rushing yards | | |
| Passing yards | | |
| Passing: Comp–Att–Int | | |
| Time of possession | | |

| Team | Category | Player | Statistics |
|---|---|---|---|
| Montana | Passing | | |
| Montana | Rushing | | |
| Montana | Receiving | | |
| Cal Poly | Passing | | |
| Cal Poly | Rushing | | |
| Cal Poly | Receiving | | |

=== No. 4 UC Davis ===
Game Ten – No. 4 UC Davis Aggies (8–1) at No. 7 Montana Grizzlies (7–2) – Game summary

| Quarter | 1 | 2 | 3 | 4 | Total |
|---|---|---|---|---|---|
| No. 4 Aggies | 0 | 0 | 0 | 0 | 0 |
| No. 7 Grizzlies | 0 | 0 | 0 | 0 | 0 |

at Washington-Grizzly Stadium, Missoula, MT

- Date: Saturday November 9, 2024
- Game time: 8:15 p.m.
- TV announcers (ESPN2): Jay Alter (play-by-play) and Rocky Boiman (analyst)

| Statistics | UCD | MONT |
|---|---|---|
| First downs | | |
| Total yards | | |
| Rushing yards | | |
| Passing yards | | |
| Passing: Comp–Att–Int | | |
| Time of possession | | |

| Team | Category | Player | Statistics |
|---|---|---|---|
| UC Davis | Passing | | |
| UC Davis | Rushing | | |
| UC Davis | Receiving | | |
| Montana | Passing | | |
| Montana | Rushing | | |
| Montana | Receiving | | |

=== Portland State ===
Game Eleven – Portland State Vikings (2–7) at No. 10 Montana Grizzlies (7–3) – Game summary

| Quarter | 1 | 2 | 3 | 4 | Total |
|---|---|---|---|---|---|
| Vikings | 0 | 0 | 0 | 0 | 0 |
| No. 10 Grizzlies | 0 | 0 | 0 | 0 | 0 |

at Washington-Grizzly Stadium, Missoula, MT

- Date: Saturday November 16, 2024
- Game time: 1:00 p.m.
- TV announcers (ESPN+/MTN): Jay Kohn, Marty Mornhinweg, Kyle Hanson

| Statistics | PRST | MONT |
|---|---|---|
| First downs | | |
| Total yards | | |
| Rushing yards | | |
| Passing yards | | |
| Passing: Comp–Att–Int | | |
| Time of possession | | |

| Team | Category | Player | Statistics |
|---|---|---|---|
| Portland State | Passing | | |
| Portland State | Rushing | | |
| Portland State | Receiving | | |
| Montana | Passing | | |
| Montana | Rushing | | |
| Montana | Receiving | | |

=== at No. 2 Montana State (rivalry) ===
Game Twelve – No. 9 Montana Grizzlies (8–3) at No. 2 Montana State Bobcats (11–0) – Game summary

| Quarter | 1 | 2 | 3 | 4 | Total |
|---|---|---|---|---|---|
| No. 9 Grizzlies | 0 | 3 | 0 | 8 | 11 |
| No. 2 Bobcats | 7 | 13 | 7 | 7 | 34 |

at Bobcat Stadium, Bozeman, MT

- Date: Saturday November 23, 2024
- Game time: 12:00 p.m.
- Game attendance: 22,057
- TV announcers (ESPN+/MTN): Ben Creighton, Marty Mornhinweg, Ty Gregorak, Kyle Hansen, Grace Lawrence

Game information

First quarter

- (6:01) MTST - Tommy Mellott 5-yard run (Myles Sansted kick) (Montana State 7-0)

Second quarter

- (13:08) MONT - Ty Morrison 47-yard field goal (Montana State 7-3)
- (10:16) MTST - Rohan Jones 35-yard pass from Tommy Mellott (Myles Sansted kick) (Montana State 14-3)
- (1:40) MTST - Myles Sansted 27-yard field goal (Montana State 17-3)
- (0:00) MTST - Myles Sansted 49-yard field goal (Montana State 20-3)

Third quarter

- (1:55) MTST - Adam Jones 3-yard run (Myles Sansted kick) (Montana State 27-3)

Fourth quarter

- (11:02) MONT - Eli Gillman 1-yard run (Logan Fife pass to Sawyer Racanelli for 2-point conversion) (Montana State 27-11)
- (4:49) MTST - Adam Jones 2-yard run (Myles Sansted kick) (Montana State 34-11)

| Statistics | MONT | MTST |
|---|---|---|
| First downs | 13 | 20 |
| Total yards | 234 | 420 |
| Rushing yards | 117 | 326 |
| Passing yards | 117 | 94 |
| Passing: Comp–Att–Int | 18-35-0 | 6-12-0 |
| Time of possession | 25:07 | 34:53 |

| Team | Category | Player | Statistics |
|---|---|---|---|
| Montana | Passing | Logan Fife | 18/34, 117 yards |
| Montana | Rushing | Eli Gillman | 10 carries, 35 yards, TD |
| Montana | Receiving | Keelan White | 5 receptions, 54 yards |
| Montana State | Passing | Tommy Mellott | 6/12, 94 yards, TD |
| Montana State | Rushing | Adam Jones | 25 carries, 197 yards, 2 TD |
| Montana State | Receiving | Rohan Jones | 2 receptions, 41 yards, TD |

=== vs No. 21 Tennessee State (NCAA Division I Playoff–First Round) ===
NCAA Division I Playoff–First Round – No. 21 Tennessee State Tigers (9–3) at No. 13 Montana Grizzlies (8–4) – Game summary

| Quarter | 1 | 2 | 3 | 4 | Total |
|---|---|---|---|---|---|
| No. 21 Tigers | 3 | 0 | 10 | 14 | 27 |
| No. 13 Grizzlies | 3 | 13 | 11 | 14 | 41 |

at Washington–Grizzly Stadium, Missoula, MT

- Date: Saturday November 30, 2024
- Game time: 8:15 p.m.
- Game weather: Clear, 32 °F (0 °C)
- Game attendance: 12,479
- Referee: David Hergert
- TV announcers (ESPN+): Roxy Bernstein (play-by-play) and Jay Walker (analyst)

Game information

First quarter

- (9:34) MONT – Ty Morrison 39 yard field goal (Drive: 5 plays, 29 yards, 1:49; MONT 3–0)
- (0:03) TNST – James Lowery 37 yard field goal (Drive: 10 plays, 57 yards, 4:44; TIED 3–3)

Second quarter

- (4:35) MONT – Eli Gillman 7 yard run, Ty Morrison kick (Drive: 10 plays, 67 yards, 4:23; MONT 10–3)
- (0:10) MONT – Ty Morrison 31 yard field goal (Drive: 5 plays, 23 yards, 2:34; MONT 13–3)
- (0:00) MONT – Ty Morrison 50 yard field goal (Drive: 2 plays, 0 yards, 0:07; MONT 16–3)

Third quarter

- (6:44) TNST – James Lowery 26 yard field goal (Drive: 5 plays, 28 yards, 2:29; MONT 16–6)
- (3:08) MONT – Ty Morrison 30 yard field goal (Drive: 11 plays, 57 yards, 3:30; MONT 19–6)
- (1:28) MONT – Junior Bergen 52 yard punt return, Logan Fife run for two-point conversion (MONT 27–6)
- (1:02) TNST – Karate Brenson 3 yard pass from Draylen Ellis, James Lowery kick (Drive: 1 play, 12 yards, 0:13; MONT 27–13)

Fourth quarter

- (14:41) TNST – Draylen Ellis 11 yard run, James Lowery kick (Drive: 1 play, 11 yards, 0:06; MONT 27–20)
- (6:21) MONT – Junior Bergen 54 yard punt return, Ty Morrison kick (MONT 34–20)
- (3:03) TNST – Karate Brenson 15 yard pass from Draylen Ellis, James Lowery kick (Drive: 11 plays, 75 yards, 3:11; MONT 34–27)
- (1:58) MONT – Eli Gillman 59 yard run, Ty Morrison kick (Drive: 2 plays, 64 yards, 0:55; MONT 41–27)

| Statistics | TNST | MONT |
|---|---|---|
| First downs | 18 | 19 |
| Total yards | 310 | 369 |
| Rushing yards | 14 | 254 |
| Passing yards | 296 | 115 |
| Passing: Comp–Att–Int | 29–39–1 | 12–23–0 |
| Time of possession | 29:48 | 30:12 |

| Team | Category | Player | Statistics |
|---|---|---|---|
| Tennessee State | Passing | Draylen Ellis | 29/39, 296 yards, 2 TD, 1 INT |
| Tennessee State | Rushing | CJ Evans | 6 carries, 26 yards |
| Tennessee State | Receiving | Karate Brenson | 11 receptions, 122 yards, 2 TD |
| Montana | Passing | Logan Fife | 11/22, 97 yards |
| Montana | Rushing | Eli Gillman | 20 carries, 136 yards, 2 TD |
| Montana | Receiving | Sawyer Racanelli | 2 receptions, 35 yards |

=== at No. 2 South Dakota State (NCAA Division I Playoff–Second Round) ===
NCAA Division I Playoff–Second Round – No. 13 Montana Grizzlies (9–4) at No. 2 South Dakota State (10–2) – Game summary

| Quarter | 1 | 2 | 3 | 4 | Total |
|---|---|---|---|---|---|
| No. 13 Grizzlies | 0 | 0 | 0 | 0 | 0 |
| No. 2 Jackrabbits | 0 | 0 | 0 | 0 | 0 |

at Dana J. Dykhouse Stadium, Brookings, SD

- Date: Saturday December 7, 2024
- Game time: 12:00 p.m
- TV announcers (ESPN+): Lowell Galindo, Fozzy Whittaker

Game information

First quarter
Second quarter
Third quarter
Fourth quarter

| Statistics | MONT | SDSU |
|---|---|---|
| First downs | | |
| Total yards | | |
| Rushing yards | | |
| Passing yards | | |
| Passing: Comp–Att–Int | | |
| Time of possession | | |

| Team | Category | Player | Statistics |
|---|---|---|---|
| Montana | Passing | | |
| Montana | Rushing | | |
| Montana | Receiving | | |
| South Dakota State | Passing | | |
| South Dakota State | Rushing | | |
| South Dakota State | Receiving | | |
