= 2024 Montana State Bobcats football team =

American college football season

2024 Montana State Bobcats football
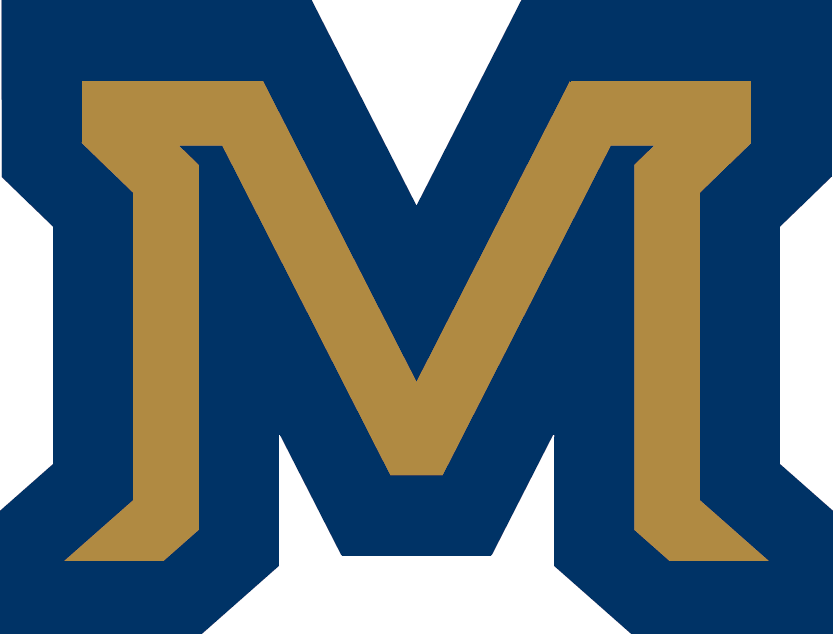

Big Sky champion

FCS Championship Game, L 32–35 vs. North Dakota State
- Conference: Big Sky Conference

Ranking
- STATS: No. 2
- FCS Coaches: No. 2
- Record: 15–1 (8–0 Big Sky)
- Head coach: Brent Vigen (4th season)
- Offensive coordinator: Tyler Walker (1st season)
- Offensive scheme: Pro spread
- Defensive coordinator: Bobby Daly (1st season)
- Co-defensive coordinator: Shawn Howe (1st season)
- Base defense: 4–2–5
- Home stadium: Bobcat Stadium

2024 Big Sky Conference football standings
	Conf.			Overall
Team	W		L	W		L
No. 2 Montana State $^	8	–	0	15	–	1
No. 5 UC Davis ^	7	–	1	11	–	3
No. 7 Idaho ^	6	–	2	10	–	4
No. 22 Northern Arizona ^	6	–	2	8	–	5
No. 10 Montana ^	5	–	3	9	–	5
Idaho State	3	–	5	5	–	7
Eastern Washington	3	–	5	4	–	8
Weber State	3	–	5	4	–	8
Portland State	3	–	5	3	–	8
Cal Poly	2	–	6	3	–	8
Sacramento State	1	–	7	3	–	9
Northern Colorado	1	–	7	1	–	11
$ – Conference champion; ^ – FCS playoff participant; Rankings from STATS Poll

The 2024 Montana State Bobcats football team represents Montana State University as a member of the Big Sky Conference during the 2024 NCAA Division I FCS football season. The Bobcats are led by fourth-year head coach Brent Vigen and play home games at Bobcat Stadium in Bozeman, Montana.

== Schedule ==
Date	Time	Opponent	Rank	Site	TV	Result	Attendance
August 24	2:00 p.m.	at New Mexico*	No. 4	University Stadium; Albuquerque, NM	FS1	W 35–31	17,314
August 31	8:00 p.m.	at Utah Tech*	No. 4	Greater Zion Stadium; St. George, UT	ESPN+	W 31–7	5,074
September 7	6:00 p.m.	Maine*	No. 3	Bobcat Stadium; Bozeman, MT	ESPN+	W 41–24	21,887
September 21	1:00 p.m.	Mercyhurst*	No. 3	Bobcat Stadium; Bozeman, MT	ESPN+	W 52–13	21,547
September 28	4:00 p.m.	at Idaho State	No. 3	ICCU Dome; Pocatello, ID	ESPN+	W 37–17	N/A
October 5	2:00 p.m.	Northern Colorado^{†}	No. 3	Bobcat Stadium; Bozeman, MT	ESPN+	W 55–14	22,007
October 12	8:15 p.m.	No. 7 Idaho	No. 3	Bobcat Stadium; Bozeman, MT	ESPN2	W 38–7	21,907
October 19	2:00 p.m.	at Portland State	No. 3	Hillsboro Stadium; Portland, OR	ESPN+	W 44–14	3,121
November 2	2:00 p.m.	at Eastern Washington	No. 2	Roos Field; Cheney, WA	ESPN+	W 42–28	6,258
November 9	1:00 p.m.	Sacramento State	No. 2	Bobcat Stadium; Bozeman, MT	ESPN+	W 49–7	21,987
November 16	6:00 p.m.	at No. 4 UC Davis	No. 2	UC Davis Health Stadium; Davis, CA	ESPN+	W 30–28	13,947
November 23	12:00 p.m.	No. 9 Montana	No. 2	Bobcat Stadium; Bozeman, MT (rivalry)	ESPN+	W 34–11	22,057
December 7	12:00 p.m.	No. 23 UT Martin*	No. 1	Bobcat Stadium; Bozeman, MT (NCAA Division I Second Round)	ESPN+	W 49–17	17,017
December 13	7:00 p.m.	No. 7 Idaho*	No. 1	Bobcat Stadium; Bozeman, MT (NCAA Division I Quarterfinal)	ESPN	W 52–19	18,127
December 21	1:30 p.m.	No. 4 South Dakota*	No. 1	Bobcat Stadium; Bozeman, MT (NCAA Division I Semifinal)	ABC	W 31–17	20,557
January 6, 2025	5:00 pm	vs. No. 3 North Dakota State*	No. 1	Toyota Stadium; Frisco, TX (NCAA Division I Championship Game)	ESPN	L 32–35	18,005
*Non-conference game; ^{†}Homecoming; Rankings from STATS Poll released prior to the game; All times are in Mountain time

== Ranking movements ==
Ranking movements Legend: ██ Increase in ranking ██ Decrease in ranking ( ) = First-place votes
	Week														
Poll	Pre	1	2	3	4	5	6	7	8	9	10	11	12	13	Final
STATS FCS	4 (1)	3 (8)	3 (6)	3 (7)	3 (6)	3 (8)	3 (6)	3 (10)	2 (16)	2 (13)	2 (13)	2 (14)	2 (15)	1 (51)	2
Coaches	4	3 (4)	3 (2)	3 (3)	3 (2)	3 (1)	3 (2)	3 (3)	2 (2)	2 (2)	2 (2)	2 (2)	2 (3)	1 (23)	2

== Roster ==
2024 Montana State Bobcats football team roster
Players
Coaches
Offense

Pos.	#	Name	Class
WR	1	Marqui Johnson	Sr
WR	2	Lonyatta Alexander Jr.	Jr
RB	3	Jared White	So
QB	4	Tommy Mellott	Sr
WR	5	Javonte King	Fr
WR	6	Ty McCullouch	Sr
TE	8	Rohan Jones	Jr
WR	9	Ryan King	Jr
WR	10	Jabez Woods	Fr
RB	11	Elijah Elliott	Sr
QB	12	Jordan Reed	So
QB	13	Chance Wilson	Fr
WR	14	Taco Dowler	So
QB	15	Patrick Duchien	Fr
WR	16	Zachary Dodson-Greene	So
QB	17	Thomas Buchanan	Fr
WR	18	Garrett Walchli	Sr
WR	19	Tom Carter	Fr
WR	20	Kee Christiansen	Fr
RB	22	Scottre Humphrey	So
RB	23	Adam Jones	Fr
WR	25	Jacob Trimble	So
RB	28	Colson Coon	Fr
RB	31	Unterrio Latin-Henley	Fr
RB	32	Julius Davis	Sr
WR	35	Dane Steel	Fr
FB	48	Max Murphy	So
OL	51	Dalton Noble	Fr
OL	54	Zac Nyland	Fr
G	55	J. T. Reed	Sr
G, C	56	Cole Sain	GS
OL	57	Everett Carr	Fr
OL	59	Samora Ezekiel	So
OL	60	Tommy Nilson	So
OL	61	Aiden Kaplan	Fr
OL	63	Dylan Rollins	Fr
OL	64	Burke Mastel	So
C	65	Justus Perkins	Sr
OT	66	Titan Fleischmann	So
OT	72	Connor Moore	So
OL	73	Cedric Jefferson	Fr
OL	74	Jaden Perkins	So
OL	75	Braden Zimmer	Fr
OT	76	Marcus Wehr	Sr
OL	79	Jonathan Luhmann	Fr
TE	80	Luvens Valcin	Fr
WR	81	Maclain Burckley	Fr
TE	82	Luke Smith	Fr
WR	85	Aidan Garrigan	Jr
TE	86	Hunter Provience	Fr
TE	87	Ryan Lonergan	Sr
TE	88	Rylan Schlepp	So
TE	89	Rocky Lencioni	Fr

Defense

Pos.	#	Name	Class
S	0	Blake Stillwell	Jr
DB	1	Andrew Powdrell	So
S	2	Dru Polidore	Jr
DB	3	Kory Boyd	Fr
CB	4	Jon Johnson	Sr
S, NB	5	Caden Dowler	So
CB	6	Miles Jackson	Sr
DB	7	Tayden Gray	Fr
CB	9	Simeon Woodard	Sr
LB	10	Bryce Grebe	Fr
DE	11	Kenneth Eiden IV	Jr
LB	12	Ryan Bowles	Fr
DB	12	Jhase McMillan	Fr
CB	13	Jackson Harmon	So
DB	16	Brendon Ross	Fr
DB	17	Taki Uluilakepa	Fr
LB	19	Neil Daily	So
S	20	Tyson Pottenger	Jr
DB	22	Takhari Carr	So
DB	23	Seth Johnson	Fr
DB	24	Colter Petre	Fr
DB	25	Carson Williams	Fr
S, NB	26	Rylan Ortt	Sr
DB	27	Brock Steel	So
DB	29	JJ Dolan	Fr
LB	30	Danny Uluilakepa	Sr
LB	33	Mason Dethman	Fr
LB	34	Cole Taylor	Fr
DB	35	Ryan Nansel	Fr
DE	36	Zac Crews	So
LB	37	Josh Woodberry	Fr
LB	40	Cole Bullock	Sr
DE	41	Brody Grebe	Sr
LB	42	Ryan Krahe	So
LB	43	McCade O'Reilly	Sr
DE	44	Jake Vigen	So
DE	45	Hunter Parsons	Jr
DE	46	Logan Fredericksen	So
LB	49	Zac Waible	So
DL	50	Zack Black	Jr
DL	51	Nicholas Korom	Sr
DT	55	AJ Tanupo	Fr
DE	58	Dominic Solano	So
DT	69	Jaren Perkins	So
DT	90	Hunter Sharbono	Fr
DE	91	Seth Brock	Fr
DT	92	Blake Schmidt	Sr
DL	94	Case Kruse	Fr
DL	95	Ryder Trujillo	Fr
DL	96	Paul Brott	Jr
DT	97	Alec Eckert	So
DL	98	Hudson Wiens	Fr
DL	99	Talon Marsh	Fr

Special teams

Pos.	#	Name	Class
K, P	38	Casey Kautzman	So
K	39	Myles Sansted	So
LS	71	Tommy Sullivan	Sr
P, K	93	Brendan Hall	Sr

Head coach

- Brent Vigen

Coordinators/assistant coaches

- Bobby Daly (Defensive coordinator / linebackers)
- Tyler Walker (Offensive coordinator / quarterbacks)
- Justin Udy (wide receivers / pass game coordinator / special teams coordinator)
- Shawn Howe (Co-defensive coordinator / defensive line)
- Al Johnson (offensive line / run game coordinator)
- Nicolas Jean-Baptiste (defensive tackles)
- Bryan Shepherd (cornerbacks)
- Sam Mix (running backs)
- Jody Owens (safeties)
- Jordan Walsh (tight ends)
- Sean Chambers (offensive analyst / assistant quarterbacks)

Legend

- (C) Team captain
- (S) Suspended
- (I) Ineligible
- Injured
- Redshirt

Roster
Last update: December 8, 2024

== 2025 NFL draft ==
The following Bobcat player was selected in the 2025 NFL draft.

Player	Position	School	Draft round	Round pick	Overall pick	Team
Tommy Mellott	WR	Montana State Bobcats	6	36	213	Las Vegas Raiders

== Game summaries ==
=== at New Mexico (FBS) ===
Game One – No. 4 Montana State Bobcats (0-0) at New Mexico Lobos (FBS) (0-0) – Game summary

Quarter	1	2	3	4	Total
No. 4 Bobcats	0	14	0	21	35
Lobos (FBS)	10	14	7	0	31

at University Stadium, Albuquerque, New Mexico

- Date: Saturday August 24, 2024
- Game time: 2:00 p.m. MDT
- Game weather: Sunny, 90 °F (32 °C)
- Game attendance: 17,314
- Referee: Jonathan Noli
- TV announcers (FS1): Tim Brando (play-by-play), Devin Gardner (analyst), and Josh Sims (sideline)
- Box score

Game information

First quarter

- (10:37) UNM – Christian Ellis 41-yard fumble return (Luke Drzewiecki kick) (New Mexico 7–0)
- (4:49) UNM – Luke Drzewiecki 45-yard field goal (Drive: 7 plays, 67 yards, 3:13; New Mexico 10–0)

Second quarter

- (13:45) UNM – Trace Bruckler 12-yard pass from Devon Dampier (Luke Drzewiecki kick) (Drive: 8 plays, 68 yards, 3:23; New Mexico 17–0)
- (10:36) MTST – Rylan Schlepp 5-yard pass from Tommy Mellott (Myles Sansted kick) (Drive: 6 plays, 75 yards, 3:09; New Mexico 17–7)
- (4:37) MTST – Ty McCullouch 17-yard pass from Tommy Mellott (Myles Sansted kick) (Drive: 10 plays, 76 yards, 4:43; New Mexico 17–14)
- (1:33) UNM – Devon Dampier 24-yard run (Luke Drzewiecki kick) (Drive: 9 plays, 75 yards, 3:04; New Mexico 24–14)

Third quarter

- (13:03) UNM – Noah Avinger 13-yard fumble return (Luke Drzewiecki kick) (New Mexico 31–14)

Fourth quarter

- (1:33) MTST – Tommy Mellott 15-yard run (Myles Sansted kick) (Drive: 10 plays, 80 yards, 5:30; New Mexico 31–21)
- (1:33) MTST – Adam Jones 93-yard run (Myles Sansted kick) (Drive: 1 play, 93 yards, 0:37; New Mexico 31–28)
- (1:33) MTST – Scottre Humphrey 4-yard run (Myles Sansted kick) (Drive: 11 plays, 89 yards, 1:49; Montana State 35–31)

Statistics	MTST	UNM
First downs	27	19
Total yards	567	324
Rushing yards	47–362	28–152
Passing yards	205	172
Passing: Comp–Att–Int	21–32–0	18–26–0
Time of possession	34:40	25:20

Team	Category	Player	Statistics
Montana State	Passing	Tommy Mellott	21/32, 205 yards, 2 TD
Montana State	Rushing	Adam Jones	17 carries, 167 yards, TD
Montana State	Receiving	Ty McCullouch	7 receptions, 66 yards, TD
New Mexico	Passing	Devon Dampier	18/26, 172 yards, TD
New Mexico	Rushing	Eli Sanders	17 carries, 87 yards
New Mexico	Receiving	Luke Wysong	6 receptions, 95 yards

Entering the game, the Bobcats were double-digit favorites to win the game. It was the first time since 2013 that an FCS team was a double-digit favorite to win against an FBS opponent.

=== at Utah Tech ===
Game Two – No. 4 Montana State Bobcats (1–0) at Utah Tech Trailblazers (0–0) – Game summary

Quarter	1	2	3	4	Total
No. 4 Bobcats	7	7	10	7	31
Trailblazers	0	0	0	7	7

at Greater Zion Stadium • St. George, UT

- Date: Saturday August 31, 2024
- Game time: 4:00 p.m. MDT
- Game weather: Sunny, 93 °F (34 °C)
- Game attendance: 5,074
- Referee: John Kellermeier
- TV announcers (ESPN+): Rod Zundel (play-by-play), Max Christensen III (color commentator)

Game information

First quarter

- (2:35) MTST - Adam Jones 17-yard run (Myles Sansted kick) (Montana State 7-0)

Second quarter

- (13:13) MTST - Tommy Mellott 47-yard run (Myles Sansted kick) (Montana State 14-0)

Third quarter

- (12:24) MTST - Rohan Jones 45-yard pass from Tommy Mellott (Myles Sansted kick) (Montana State 21-0)
- (7:45) MTST - Brendan Hall 28-yard field goal (Montana State 24-0)

Fourth quarter

- (14:02) MTST - Tommy Mellott 1-yard run (Myles Sansted kick) (Montana State 31-0)
- (13:03) UTTU - Deacon Hill 24-yard run (Ilya Uvaydov kick) (Montana State 31-7)

Statistics	MTST	UTU
First downs	25	6
Total yards	481	176
Rushing yards	329	73
Passing yards	152	103
Passing: Comp–Att–Int	14-24-0	12-26-0
Time of possession	44:36	15:24

Team	Category	Player	Statistics
Montana State	Passing	Tommy Mellott	14/21, 152 yards, 1 TD
Montana State	Rushing	Scottre Humphrey	20 carries, 107 yards
Montana State	Receiving	Rohan Jones	4 receptions, 66 yards, TD
Utah Tech	Passing	Deacon Hill	11/23, 104 yards
Utah Tech	Rushing	Deacon Hill	2 carries, 25 yards, TD
Utah Tech	Receiving	Fisher Jackson	1 reception, 37 yards

=== vs. Maine ===
Game Three – Maine Black Bears (1–0) vs No. 3 Montana State Bobcats (2–0) – Game summary

Quarter	1	2	3	4	Total
Black Bears	0	7	7	10	24
No. 3 Bobcats	21	17	3	0	41

at Bobcat Stadium • Bozeman, MT

- Date: Saturday September 7, 2024
- Game time: 8:00 PM EST
- Game weather: 85 °F (29 °C)
- Game attendance: 21,887
- TV announcers (ESPN+): TBD

Game information

First quarter

- (11:21) MTST - Scottre Humphrey 79-yard run (Myles Sansted kick) (Montana State 7-0)
- (8:33) MTST - Adam Jones 40-yard run (Myles Sansted kick) (Montana State 14-0)
- (4:39) MTST - Ryan Lonergan 4-yard pass from Tommy Mellott (Myles Sansted kick) (Montana State 21-0)

Second quarter

- (14:56) MTST - Scottre Humphrey 6-yard run (Myles Sansted kick) (Montana State 28-0)
- (8:29) MTST - Adam Jones 19-yard run (Myles Sansted kick) (Montana State 35-0)
- (3:15) ME - Montigo Moss 5-yard pass from Carter Peevy (Joey Bryson kick) (Montana State 35-7)
- (0:21) MTST - Myles Sansted 24-yard field goal (Montana State 38-7)

Third quarter

- (11:03) ME - Trevin Ewing 19-yard run (Joey Bryson kick) (Montana State 38-14)
- (3:12) MTST - Myles Sansted 31-yard field goal (Montana State 41-14)

Fourth quarter

- (13:36) ME - Declan McKevitt 25-yard pass from Carter Peevy (Joey Bryson kick) (Montana State 41-21)
- (4:30) ME - Joey Bryson 25-yard field goal (Montana State 41-24)

Statistics	ME	MTST
First downs	16	21
Total yards	373	526
Rushing yards	149	344
Passing yards	224	182
Passing: Comp–Att–Int	18-31-1	14-21-0
Time of possession	34:16	25:44

Team	Category	Player	Statistics
Maine	Passing	Carter Peevy	18/31, 224 yards, 2 TD, INT
Maine	Rushing	Tavion Banks	8 carries, 74 yards
Maine	Receiving	Montigo Moss	5 receptions, 47 yards, TD
Montana State	Passing	Tommy Mellott	12/15, 144 yards, TD
Montana State	Rushing	Scottre Humphrey	4 carries, 110 yards, 2 TD
Montana State	Receiving	Ryan King	3 receptions, 39 yards

=== vs. Mercyhurst ===
Game Four – Mercyhurst Lakers (1–2) vs No. 3 Montana State Bobcats (3–0) – Game summary

Quarter	1	2	3	4	Total
Lakers	0	0	6	7	13
No. 3 Bobcats	10	21	14	7	52

at Bobcat Stadium • Bozeman, MT

- Date: Saturday September 21, 2024
- Game time: 1:00 PM MST
- Game weather: Sunny, 49 °F (9 °C)
- Game attendance: 21,547
- TV announcers (ESPN+): TBD

Game information

First quarter

- (8:07) MTST - Myles Sansted 23-yard field goal (Montana State 3-0)
- (1:47) MTST - Scottre Humphrey 5-yard run (Myles Sansted kick) (Montana State 10-0)

Second quarter

- (7:24) MTST - Taco Dowler 5-yard pass from Tommy Mellott (Myles Sansted kick) (Montana State 17-0)
- (5:56) MTST - Zac Crews 24-yard blocked punt return (Myles Sansted kick) (Montana State 24-0)
- (0:27) MTST - Adam Jones 50-yard pass from Tommy Mellott (Myles Sansted kick) (Montana State 31-0)

Third quarter

- (8:23) MTST - Rohan Jones 16-yard pass from Tommy Mellott (Myles Sansted kick) (Montana State 38-0)
- (5:36) MERC - Adonis Marshall 43-yard fumble return (PAT failed) (Montana State 38-6)
- (3:13) MTST - Colson Coon 50-yard run (Myles Sansted kick) (Montana State 45-6)

Fourth quarter

- (8:47) MERC - Joe Kerbacher 5-yard pass from Adam Urena (Nathan Nagucki kick) (Montana State 45-13)
- (3:43) MTST - Chance Wilson 5-yard run (Myles Sansted kick) (Montana State 52-13)

Statistics	MERC	MTST
First downs	16	23
Total yards	233	502
Rushing yards	20	256
Passing yards	213	246
Passing: Comp–Att–Int	28-44-0	15-19-0
Time of possession	32:56	27:04

Team	Category	Player	Statistics
Mercyhurst	Passing	Adam Urena	28/44, 213 yards, TD
Mercyhurst	Rushing	Ayron Rodriguez	15 carries, 42 yards
Mercyhurst	Receiving	Cameron Barmore	7 receptions, 95 yards
Montana State	Passing	Tommy Mellott	14/18, 214 yards, 3 TD
Montana State	Rushing	Colson Coon	10 carries, 102 yards, TD
Montana State	Receiving	Adam Jones	3 receptions, 72 yards, TD

=== at Idaho State ===
Game Five – No. 3 Montana State Bobcats (4–0) at Idaho State Bengals (2–2) – Game summary

Quarter	1	2	3	4	Total
No. 3 Bobcats	3	14	0	20	37
Bengals	0	7	0	10	17

at ICCU Dome • Pocatello, ID

- Date: Saturday September 28, 2024
- Game time: 4:00 PM MST
- Game weather: None (Indoor stadium)
- Game attendance: N/A
- Referee: Scott Root
- TV announcers (ESPN+): Ben Creighton (play-by-play), Ty Gregorak (analyst) and Grace Lawrence (sideline reporter)

Game information

First quarter

- (4:55) MTST – Myles Sansted 44-yard field goal (Drive: 7 plays, 16 yards, 2:52; Montana State 3–0)

Second quarter

- (14:56) MTST – Tommy Mellott 7-yard run, Myles Sansted kick (Drive: 9 plays, 74 yards, 0:04; Montana State 10–0)
- (4:33) MTST – Scottre Humphrey 18-yard run, Myles Sansted kick (Drive: 4 plays, 49 yards, 1:56; Montana State 17–0)
- (0:06) IDST – Michael Shulikov 5-yard pass from Kobe Tracy, Gabe Panikowski kick (Drive: 14 plays, 75 yards, 4:27; Montana State 17–7)

Third quarter

- No scoring plays

Fourth quarter

- (14:56) IDST – Gabe Panikowski 33-yard field goal (Drive: 12 plays, 77 yards, 5:05; Montana State 17–10)
- (14:47) MTST – Rohan Jones 70-yard pass from Tommy Mellott, Myles Sansted kick (Drive: 1 play, 70 yards, 0:09; Montana State 24–10)
- (8:58) MTST – Scottre Humphrey 6-yard run, Myles Sansted kick (Drive: 8 plays, 74 yards, 4:08; Montana State 31–10)
- (4:58) IDST – Jeff Weimer 16-yard pass from Kobe Tracy, Gabe Panikowski kick (Drive: 10 plays, 75 yards, 4:00; Montana State 31–17)
- (0:00) MTST – Scottre Humphrey 8-yard run (Drive: 9 plays, 44 yards, 4:57; Montana State 37–17)

Statistics	MTST	IDST
First downs	21	16
Total yards	410	276
Rushing yards	268	75
Passing yards	142	201
Passing: Comp–Att–Int	10-17-0	20-41-1
Time of possession	31:42	23:44

Team	Category	Player	Statistics
Montana State	Passing	Tommy Mellott	10/17, 142 yards, TD
Montana State	Rushing	Scottre Humphrey	27 carries, 159 yards, 3 TD
Montana State	Receiving	Rohan Jones	2 receptions, 93 yards, TD
Idaho State	Passing	Kobe Tracy	17/33, 183 yards, 2 TD
Idaho State	Rushing	Dason Brooks	5 carries, 25 yards
Idaho State	Receiving	Christian Fredericksen	6 receptions, 60 yards

=== vs. Northern Colorado ===
Game Six – Northern Colorado Bears (0–5) vs No. 3 Montana State Bobcats (5–0) – Game summary

Quarter	1	2	3	4	Total
Bears	0	0	14	3	17
No. 3 Bobcats	13	14	21	7	55

at Bobcat Stadium • Bozeman, MT

- Date: Saturday October 5, 2024
- Game time: 2:00 PM MST
- Game weather: Sunny • Temperature: 58 °F (14 °C) • Wind: S 6 mph
- Game attendance: 22,007
- Referee: Jim Crowley
- TV announcers (ESPN+): Ben Creighton (play-by-play), Ty Gregorak (analyst) and Grace Lawrence (sideline)

Game information

First quarter

- (9:56) MTST – Ryan Lonergan 9-yard pass from Tommy Mellott (Drive: 5 plays, 63 yards, 3:16; Montana State 6–0)
- (3:12) MTST – Rohan Jones 6-yard pass from Tommy Mellott, Myles Sansted kick (Drive: 9 plays, 51 yards, 5:30; Montana State 13–0)

Second quarter

- (9:45) MTST – Taco Dowler 34-yard pass from Tommy Mellott, Myles Sansted kick (Drive: 2 plays, 37 yards, 0:46; Montana State 20–0)
- (6:16) MTST – Tommy Mellott 13-yard run, Myles Sansted kick (Drive: 5 plays, 35 yards, 2:45; Montana State 27–0)

Third quarter

- (8:25) MTST – Ty McCullouch 50-yard pass from Tommy Mellott, Myles Sansted kick (Drive: 5 plays, 61 yards, 2:37; Montana State 34–0)
- (5:45) UNCO – Carver Cheeks 14-yard pass from Caden Meis, Hunter Green kick (Drive: 4 plays, 58 yards, 1:26; Montana State 34–7)
- (4:58) MTST – Taco Dowler 72-yard pass from Tommy Mellott, Myles Sansted kick (Drive: 2 plays, 75 yards, 0:47; Montana State 41–7)
- (2:07) UNCO – Brayden Munroe 28-yard pass from Kia'i Keone, Hunter Green kick (Drive: 6 plays, 75 yards, 2:51; Montana State 41–14)
- (0:21) MTST – Scottre Humphrey 17-yard run, Myles Sansted kick (Drive: 3 plays, 75 yards, 1:39; Montana State 48–14)

Fourth quarter

- (11:14) UNCO – Hunter Green 29-yard field goal (Drive: 5 plays, 29 yards, 1:24; Montana State 48–17)
- (8:58) MTST – Chance Wilson 5-yard run, Myles Sansted kick (Drive: 17 plays, 75 yards, 9:20; Montana State 55–17)

Statistics	UNCO	MTST
First downs	20	21
Total yards	362	510
Rushing yards	101	232
Passing yards	261	278
Passing: Comp–Att–Int	18–30–1	11–16–0
Time of possession	25:20	34:40

Team	Category	Player	Statistics
Northern Colorado	Passing	Kia'i Keone	17/29, 247 yards, TD, INT
Northern Colorado	Rushing	Caden Meis	10 carries, 35 yards
Northern Colorado	Receiving	Brayden Munroe	5 receptions, 84 yards, TD
Montana State	Passing	Tommy Mellott	8/12, 225 yards, 4 TD
Montana State	Rushing	Scottre Humphrey	10 carries, 81 yards, TD
Montana State	Receiving	Taco Dowler	2 receptions, 106 yards, 2 TD

=== vs. No. 7 Idaho ===
Game Seven – No. 7 Idaho Vandals (4–2) vs No. 3 Montana State Bobcats (6–0) – Game summary

Quarter	1	2	3	4	Total
No. 7 Vandals	0	0	0	7	7
No. 3 Bobcats	14	10	7	7	38

at Bobcat Stadium • Bozeman, MT

- Date: Saturday October 12, 2024
- Game time: 8:15 PM MST
- Game weather: 0 °F (−18 °C)
- TV announcers (ESPN2): Jay Alter (play-by-play) and Rocky Boiman (analyst)

Game information

First quarter

- (5:34) MTST - Tommy Mellott 65-yard run (Myles Sansted kick) (Montana State 7-0)
- (0:11) MTST - Taco Dowler 34-yard pass from Tommy Mellott (Myles Sansted kick) (Montana State 14-0)

Second quarter

- (1:44) MTST - Tommy Mellott 7-yard run (Myles Sansted kick) (Montana State 21-0)
- (0:00) MTST - Myles Sansted 34-yard field goal (Montana State 24-0)

Third quarter

- (12:48) MTST - Rohan Jones 11-yard pass from Tommy Mellott (Myles Sansted kick) (Montana State 31-0)

Fourth quarter

- (12:44) MTST - Adam Jones 4-yard run (Myles Sansted kick) (Montana State 38-0)
- (0:43) IDHO - Deshaun Buchanan 9-yard pass from Jack Wagner (Cameron Pope kick) (Montana State 38-7)

Statistics	IDHO	MTST
First downs	13	27
Total yards	267	485
Rushing yards	91	360
Passing yards	176	125
Passing: Comp–Att–Int	16-31-1	12-17-0
Time of possession	22:17	37:43

Team	Category	Player	Statistics
Idaho	Passing	Jack Wagner	11/23, 134 yards, TD, INT
Idaho	Rushing	Deshaun Buchanan	9 carries, 49 yards
Idaho	Receiving	Tony Harste	3 receptions, 48 yards
Montana State	Passing	Tommy Mellott	11/15, 121 yards, 2 TD
Montana State	Rushing	Tommy Mellott	11 carries, 140 yards, 2 TD
Montana State	Receiving	Rohan Jones	3 receptions, 28 yards, TD

=== at Portland State ===
Game Eight – No. 3 Montana State Bobcats (7–0) at Portland State Vikings (1–5) – Game summary

Quarter	1	2	3	4	Total
No. 3 Bobcats	7	28	6	3	44
Vikings	0	0	0	14	14

at Hillsboro Stadium • Hillsboro, OR

- Date: Saturday October 19, 2024
- Game time: 4:00 PM EST
- Game weather: Sunny • Temperature: 65 °F (18 °C) • Wind: E 3 mph
- Game attendance: 3,121
- Referee: Michael Bezner
- TV announcers (ESPN+): Ben Creighton (play-by-play), Ty Gregorak (analyst) and Grace Lawrence (sideline)

Game information

First quarter

- (10:20) MTST - Scottre Humphrey 7-yard run (Myles Sansted kick) (Montana State 7-0)

Second quarter

- (9:13) MTST - Taco Dowler 57-yard pass from Tommy Mellott (Myles Sansted kick) (Montana State 14-0)
- (5:58) MTST - Scottre Humphrey 6-yard run (Myles Sansted kick) (Montana State 21-0)
- (1:55) MTST - Jared White 24-yard pass from Tommy Mellott (Myles Sansted kick) (Montana State 28-0)
- (0:21) MTST - Rohan Jones 48-yard pass from Tommy Mellott (Myles Sansted kick) (Montana State 35-0)

Third quarter

- (7:38) MTST - Myles Sansted 28-yard field goal (Montana State 38-0)
- (0:30) MTST - Myles Sansted 25-yard field goal (Montana State 41-0)

Fourth quarter

- (11:44) PRST - Deion Thompson 9-yard run (Mathias Uribe kick) (Montana State 41-7)
- (5:12) MTST - Myles Sansted 45-yard field goal (Montana State 44-7)
- (0:32) PRST - William Haskell 12-yard run (Mathias Uribe kick) (Montana State 44-14)

Statistics	MTST	PRST
First downs	27	18
Total yards	607	235
Rushing yards	323	149
Passing yards	284	86
Passing: Comp–Att–Int	19–28–0	14–22–1
Time of possession	34:06	25:54

Team	Category	Player	Statistics
Montana State	Passing	Tommy Mellott	15/20, 239 yards, 3 TD
Montana State	Rushing	Scottre Humphrey	14 carries, 160 yards, 2 TD
Montana State	Receiving	Taco Dowler	3 receptions, 78 yards, TD
Portland State	Passing	Dante Chachere	11/18, 64 yards, INT
Portland State	Rushing	Deion Thompson	12 carries, 78 yards, TD
Portland State	Receiving	Branden Alvarez	4 receptions, 23 yards

=== at Eastern Washington ===
Game Nine – No. 2 Montana State Bobcats (8–0) at Eastern Washington Eagles (2–6) – Game summary

Quarter	1	2	3	4	Total
No. 2 Bobcats	14	14	7	7	42
Eagles	7	7	14	0	28

at Roos Field • Cheney, WA

- Date: Saturday November 2, 2024
- Game time: 4:00 PM EST
- Game weather: 0 °F (−18 °C)
- TV announcers (ESPN+): Ben Creighton, Ty Gregorak, Grace Lawrence

Game information

First quarter

- (7:21) MTST - Scottre Humphrey 1-yard run (Myles Sansted kick) (Montana State 7-0)
- (7:06) MTST - Taco Dowler 19-yard pass from Tommy Mellott (Myles Sansted kick) (Montana State 14-0)
- (0:57) EWU - Efton Chism III 4-yard pass from Jared Taylor (Soren McKee kick) (Montana State 14-7)

Second quarter

- (12:20) MTST - Adam Jones 20-yard run (Myles Sansted kick) (Montana State 21-7)
- (11:35) EWU - Michael Wortham 75-yard run (Soren McKee kick) (Montana State 21-14)
- (1:55) MTST - Scottre Humphrey 4-yard run (Myles Sansted kick) (Montana State 28-14)

Third quarter

- (9:01) EWU - Tuna Altahir 3-yard pass from Jared Taylor (Soren McKee kick) (Montana State 28-21)
- (1:26) EWU - Tuna Altahir 11-yard run (Soren McKee kick) (Tied 28-28)
- (1:07) MTST - Tommy Mellott 76-yard run (Myles Sansted kick) (Montana State 35-28)

Fourth quarter

- (3:15) MTST - Ty McCullouch 61-yard pass from Tommy Mellott (Montana State 42-28)

Statistics	MTST	EWU
First downs	22	18
Total yards	497	393
Rushing yards	316	225
Passing yards	181	168
Passing: Comp–Att–Int	13-20-1	22-30-1
Time of possession	32:04	27:56

Team	Category	Player	Statistics
Montana State	Passing	Tommy Mellott	13/20, 181 yards, 2 TD, INT
Montana State	Rushing	Tommy Mellott	6 carries, 125 yards, TD
Montana State	Receiving	Ty McCullouch	2 receptions, 68 yards, TD
Eastern Washington	Passing	Jared Taylor	20/27, 144 yards, 2 TD, INT
Eastern Washington	Rushing	Michael Wortham	2 carries, 92 yards, TD
Eastern Washington	Receiving	Efton Chism III	9 carries, 78 yards, TD

=== vs. Sacramento State ===
Game Ten – Sacramento State Hornets (3–6) vs No. 2 Montana State Bobcats (9–0) – Game summary

Quarter	1	2	3	4	Total
Hornets	0	0	7	0	7
No. 2 Bobcats	14	14	14	7	49

at Bobcat Stadium • Bozeman, MT

- Date: Saturday November 9, 2024
- Game time: 3:00 PM EST
- Game weather: Cloudy • Temperature: 47 °F (8 °C) • Wind: W 2 mph
- Game attendance: 21,987
- Referee: Michael Bezner
- TV announcers (ESPN+): Ben Creighton (play-by-play), Ty Gregorak (analyst) and Grace Lawrence (sideline)

Game information

First quarter

- (11:04) MTST - Ty McCullouch 64-yard run (Myles Sansted kick) (Montana State 7-0)
- (5:41) MTST - Tommy Mellott 14-yard run (Myles Sansted kick) (Montana State 14-0)

Second quarter

- (10:14) MTST - Julius Davis 5-yard run (Myles Sansted kick) (Montana State 21-0)
- (3:08) MTST - Tommy Mellott 13-yard run (Myles Sansted kick) (Montana State 28-0)

Third quarter

- (13:30) MTST - Scottre Humphrey 3-yard run (Myles Sansted kick) (Montana State 35-0)
- (9:56) MTST - Adam Jones 57-yard run (Myles Sansted kick) (Montana State 42-0)
- (8:39) SAC - Curron Borders 43-yard run (Zach Schreiner kick) (Montana State 42-7)

Fourth quarter

- (13:26) MTST - Julius Davis 1-yard run (Myles Sansted kick) (Montana State 49-7)

Statistics	SAC	MTST
First downs	15	24
Total yards	255	604
Rushing yards	119	508
Passing yards	136	96
Passing: Comp–Att–Int	13–30–1	8–13–0
Time of possession	26:35	33:25

Team	Category	Player	Statistics
Sacramento State	Passing	Carson Conklin	12/27, 138 yards, INT
Sacramento State	Rushing	Curron Borders	5 carries, 57 yards, TD
Sacramento State	Receiving	Danny Scudero	7 receptions, 70 yards
Montana State	Passing	Tommy Mellott	7/10, 89 yards
Montana State	Rushing	Adam Jones	5 carries, 159 yards, TD
Montana State	Receiving	Ty McCullouch	1 reception, 32 yards

=== at No. 4 UC Davis ===
Game Eleven – No. 2 Montana State Bobcats (10–0) at No. 4 UC Davis Aggies (9–1) – Game summary

Quarter	1	2	3	4	Total
No. 2 Bobcats	7	16	7	0	30
No. 4 Aggies	8	0	0	20	28

at UC Davis Health Stadium • Davis, CA

- Date: Saturday November 16, 2024
- Game time: 8:00 PM EST
- Game weather: Sunny
- Game attendance: 13,947
- Referee: Robert Quello
- TV announcers (ESPN+): Ben Creighton (play-by-play) and Ty Gregorak (analyst)

Game information

First quarter

- (8:11) UCD - Ian Simpson 1-yard pass from Miles Hastings (Winston Williams run for 2-point conversion) (UC Davis 8-0)
- (5:24) MTST - Rohan Jones 53-yard pass from Tommy Mellott (Myles Sansted kick) (UC Davis 8-7)

Second quarter

- (14:19) MTST - Ty McCullouch 17-yard pass from Tommy Mellott (Myles Sansted kick) (Montana State 14-8)
- (12:43) MTST - Taco Dowler 79-yard punt return (PAT blocked) (Montana State 20-8)
- (2:00) MTST - Myles Sansted 42-yard field goal (Montana State 23-8)

Third quarter

- (10:22) MTST - Julius Davis 7-yard run (Myles Sansted kick) (Montana State 30-8)

Fourth quarter

- (6:21) UCD - Lan Larison 1-yard run (Hunter Ridley kick) (Montana State 30-15)
- (1:45) UCD - Samuel Gbatu Jr. 4-yard pass from Miles Hastings (Hunter Ridley kick) (Montana State 30-22)
- (0:34) UCD - Chaz Davis 11-yard pass from Miles Hastings (2-point conversion failed) (Montana State 30-28)

Statistics	MTST	UCD
First downs	16	21
Total yards	333	416
Rushing yards	159	92
Passing yards	174	324
Passing: Comp–Att–Int	18–25–0	23–34–1
Time of possession	33:17	26:43

Team	Category	Player	Statistics
Montana State	Passing	Tommy Mellott	18/25, 174 yards, 2 TD
Montana State	Rushing	Julius Davis	13 carries, 91 yards, TD
Montana State	Receiving	Rohan Jones	3 receptions, 58 yards, TD
UC Davis	Passing	Miles Hastings	22/33, 320 yards, 3 TD, INT
UC Davis	Rushing	Lan Larison	23 carries, 112 yards, TD
UC Davis	Receiving	Chaz Davis	4 receptions, 128 yards, TD

=== vs. No. 9 Montana (rivalry) ===
Game Twelve – No. 9 Montana Grizzlies (8–3) vs No. 2 Montana State Bobcats (11–0) – Game summary

Quarter	1	2	3	4	Total
No. 9 Grizzlies	0	3	0	8	11
No. 2 Bobcats	7	13	7	7	34

at Bobcat Stadium • Bozeman, MT

- Date: Saturday November 23, 2024
- Game time: 12:00 PM MST
- Game weather: 0 °F (−18 °C)
- Game attendance: 22,057
- TV announcers (ESPN+): Ben Creighton, Marty Mornhinweg, Ty Gregorak, Kyle Hansen, Grace Lawrence

Game information

First quarter

- (6:01) MTST - Tommy Mellott 5-yard run (Myles Sansted kick) (Montana State 7-0)

Second quarter

- (13:08) MONT - Ty Morrison 47-yard field goal (Montana State 7-3)
- (10:16) MTST - Rohan Jones 35-yard pass from Tommy Mellott (Myles Sansted kick) (Montana State 14-3)
- (1:40) MTST - Myles Sansted 27-yard field goal (Montana State 17-3)
- (0:00) MTST - Myles Sansted 49-yard field goal (Montana State 20-3)

Third quarter

- (1:55) MTST - Adam Jones 3-yard run (Myles Sansted kick) (Montana State 27-3)

Fourth quarter

- (11:02) MONT - Eli Gillman 1-yard run (Logan Fife pass to Sawyer Racanelli for 2-point conversion) (Montana State 27-11)
- (4:49) MTST - Adam Jones 2-yard run (Myles Sansted kick) (Montana State 34-11)

Statistics	MONT	MTST
First downs	13	20
Total yards	234	420
Rushing yards	117	326
Passing yards	117	94
Passing: Comp–Att–Int	18-35-0	6-12-0
Time of possession	25:07	34:53

Team	Category	Player	Statistics
Montana	Passing	Logan Fife	18/34, 117 yards
Montana	Rushing	Eli Gillman	10 carries, 35 yards, TD
Montana	Receiving	Keelan White	5 receptions, 54 yards
Montana State	Passing	Tommy Mellott	6/12, 94 yards, TD
Montana State	Rushing	Adam Jones	25 carries, 197 yards, 2 TD
Montana State	Receiving	Rohan Jones	2 receptions, 41 yards, TD

=== vs. No. 23 UT Martin (NCAA Division I Playoff–Second Round) ===
NCAA Division I Playoff–Second Round – No. 23 UT Martin Skyhawks (9–4) at No. 1 Montana State (12–0) – Game summary

Quarter	1	2	3	4	Total
No. 23 Skyhawks	0	10	0	7	17
No. 1 Bobcats	14	14	14	7	49

at Bobcat Stadium • Bozeman, MT

- Date: Saturday December 7, 2024
- Game time: 1:00 p.m.
- Game weather: Sunny, 50 °F (10 °C)
- Game attendance: 17,017
- Referee: Jason Perkins
- TV announcers (ESPN+): Jason Ross Jr. (play-by-play) and Tyoka Jackson (analyst)

Game information

First quarter

- (12:24) MTST – Hunter Provience 24 yard pass from Tommy Mellott, Myles Sansted kick (Drive: 5 plays, 75 yards, 2:36; MTST 7–0)
- (4:22) MTST – Taco Dowler 12 yard pass from Tommy Mellott, Myles Sansted kick (Drive: 3 plays, 58 yards, 0:58; MTST 14–0)

Second quarter

- (12:09) MTST – Ty McCullouch 6 yard run, Myles Sansted kick (Drive: 10 plays, 84 yards, 5:47; MTST 21–0)
- (5:37) UTM – Jaren Van Winkle 37 yard field goal (Drive: 14 plays, 56 yards, 6:32; MTST 21–3)
- (2:02) UTM – Trevonte Rucker 78 yard pass from Kinkead Dent, Jaren Van Winkle kick (Drive: 3 plays, 77 yards, 0:54; MTST 21–10)
- (1:10) MTST – Ty McCullouch 39 yard pass from Tommy Mellott, Myles Sansted kick (Drive: 6 plays, 73 yards, 0:52; MTST 28–10)

Third quarter

- (11:05) MTST – Scottre Humphrey 36 yard run, Myles Sansted kick (Drive: 2 plays, 37 yards, 0:46; MTST 35–10)
- (6:50) MTST – Taco Dowler 29 yard pass from Tommy Mellott, Myles Sansted kick (Drive: 5 plays, 87 yards, 2:52; MTST 42–10)

Fourth quarter

- (11:27) MTST – Adam Jones 30 yard run, Myles Sansted kick (Drive: 8 plays, 68 yards, 4:26; MTST 49–10)
- (3:29) UTM – Trevonte Rucker 4 yard pass from Kinkead Dent, Jaren Van Winkle kick (Drive: 14 plays, 75 yards, 7:58; MTST 49–17)

Statistics	UTM	MTST
First downs	11	22
Total yards	264	501
Rushing yards	92	201
Passing yards	172	300
Passing: Comp–Att–Int	16–31–0	22–26–0
Time of possession	30:37	29:23

Team	Category	Player	Statistics
UT Martin	Passing	Kinkead Dent	15/29, 167 yds, 3 TD
UT Martin	Rushing	Patrick Smith	12 carries, 32 yards
UT Martin	Receiving	Trevonte Rucker	6 receptions, 107 yards, 2 TD
Montana State	Passing	Tommy Mellott	22/25, 300 yds, 4 TD
Montana State	Rushing	Scottre Humphrey	11 carries, 102 yards, 1 TD
Montana State	Receiving	Ryan Lonergan	3 receptions, 90 yards

=== vs. No. 7 Idaho (NCAA Division I Playoff–Quarterfinal) ===
NCAA Division I Playoff–Quarterfinal – No. 7 Idaho Vandals (10–3) at No. 1 Montana State (13–0) – Game summary

Quarter	1	2	3	4	Total
No. 7 Vandals	7	3	0	9	19
No. 1 Bobcats	7	24	14	7	52

at Bobcat Stadium • Bozeman, MT

- Date: Friday December 13, 2024
- Game time: 7:00 p.m.
- TV announcers (ESPN): Clay Matvick (play-by-play), Rene Ingoglia (analyst) and Morgan Uber (sideline)

Game information

First quarter

- (10:07) MTST – Ryan Schlepp 3 yard pass from Tommy Mellott, Myles Sansted kick (Drive: 9 plays, 75 yards, 4:53; MTST 7–0)
- (2:22) IDHO – Jordan Dwyer 55 yard pass from Jack Layne, Cameron Pope kick (Drive: 1 play, 55 yards, 0:08; Tied 7–7)

Second quarter

- (11:19) MTST – Myles Sansted 48 yard field goal (Drive: 13 plays, 46 yards, 6:03; MTST 10–7)
- (8:22) IDHO – Cameron Pope 32 yard field goal (Drive: 6 plays, 60 yards, 2:57; Tied 10–10)
- (3:47) MTST – Tommy Mellott 8 yard run, Myles Sansted kick (Drive: 8 plays, 38 yards, 4:35; MTST 17–10)
- (1:15) MTST – Adam Jones 2 yard run, Myles Sansted kick (Drive: 5 plays, 28 yards, 1:49; MTST 24–10)
- (0:08) MTST – Adam Jones 1 yard run, Myles Sansted kick (Drive: 4 plays, 65 yards, 0:27; MTST 31–10)

Third quarter

- (9:41) MTST – Adam Jones 9 yard run, Myles Sansted kick (Drive: 8 plays, 45 yards, 5:07; MTST 38–10)
- (0:59) MTST – Taco Dowler 5 yard pass from Tommy Mellott, Myles Sansted kick (Drive: 9 plays, 41 yards, 6:23; MTST 45–10)

Fourth quarter

- (14:04) MTST – Adam Jones 2 yard run, Myles Sansted kick (Drive: 3 plays, 60 yards, 1:12; MTST 52–10)
- (12:31) IDHO – Jordan Dwyer 25 yard pass from Jack Layne, 2-point conversion failed (Drive: 6 plays, 75 yards, 1:33; MTST 52–16)
- (3:55) IDHO – Cameron Pope 43 yard field goal (Drive: 14 plays, 73 yards, 5:45; MTST 52–19)

Statistics	IDHO	MTST
First downs	17	20
Total yards	407	457
Rushing yards	143	283
Passing yards	264	174
Passing: Comp–Att–Int	23-36-1	12-19-1
Time of possession	21:09	38:51

Team	Category	Player	Statistics
Idaho	Passing	Jack Layne	20/30, 239 yards, 2 TD, INT
Idaho	Rushing	Deshaun Buchanan	10 carries, 95 yards
Idaho	Receiving	Jordan Dwyer	11 receptions, 189 yards, 2 TD
Montana State	Passing	Tommy Mellott	12/18, 174 yards, 2 TD, INT
Montana State	Rushing	Tommy Mellott	14 carries, 131 yards, TD
Montana State	Receiving	Adam Jones	3 receptions, 66 yards

=== vs. No. 4 South Dakota (NCAA Division I Playoff–Semifinal) ===
NCAA Division I Playoff–Semifinal
No. 4 South Dakota Coyotes (11–2) at No. 1 Montana State (14–0) – Game summary

Quarter	1	2	3	4	Total
No. 4 Coyotes	7	7	3	0	17
No. 1 Bobcats	14	10	7	0	31

at Bobcat Stadium • Bozeman, MT

- Date: Saturday December 21, 2024
- Game time: 1:30 p.m.
- Game attendance: 20,557
- TV: ABC

Game information

First quarter

- (11:56) MTST – Taco Dowler 34 yard pass from Tommy Mellott, Myles Sansted kick (Drive: 6 plays, 65 yards, 3:04; MTST 7–0)
- (8:52) SDAK – Travis Theis 55 yard run, Will Leyland kick (Drive: 5 plays, 89 yards, 3:04; Tied 7–7)
- (1:04) MTST – Tommy Mellott 5 yard run, Myles Sansted kick (Drive: 6 plays, 47 yards, 2:46; MTST 14–7)

Second quarter

- (14:51) SDAK – Charles Pierre Jr. 45 yard run, Will Leyland kick (Drive: 3 plays, 75 yards, 1:13; Tied 14–14)
- (8:24) MTST – Scottre Humphrey 1 yard run, Myles Sansted kick (Drive: 12 plays, 74 yards, 6:27; MTST 21–14)
- (0:08) MTST – Myles Sansted 28 yard field goal (Drive: 15 plays, 64 yards, 5:03; MTST 24–14)

Third quarter

- (10:30) MTST – Tommy Mellott 41 yard run, Myles Sansted kick (Drive: 5 plays, 80 yards, 2:51; MTST 31–14)
- (2:55) SDAK – Will Leyland 46 yard field goal (Drive: 6 plays, 20 yards, 2:11; MTST 31–17)

Fourth quarter

- No scoring plays

Statistics	SDAK	MTST
First downs	16	20
Total yards	371	356
Rushing yards	135	222
Passing yards	236	134
Passing: Comp–Att–Int	20-29-0	8-17-0
Time of possession	27:56	32:04

Team	Category	Player	Statistics
South Dakota	Passing	Aidan Bouman	20/29, 236 yards
South Dakota	Rushing	Travis Theis	14 carries, 110 yards, TD
South Dakota	Receiving	Travis Theis	7 receptions, 80 yards
Montana State	Passing	Tommy Mellott	8/17, 134 yards, TD
Montana State	Rushing	Tommy Mellott	17 carries, 125 yards, 2 TD
Montana State	Receiving	Taco Dowler	4 receptions, 94 yards, TD

=== vs. No. 3 North Dakota State (NCAA Division I National Championship) ===
2024 NCAA Division I Football Championship Game
No. 3 North Dakota State Bison (13–2) vs No. 1 Montana State Bobcats (15–0)

Quarter	1	2	3	4	Total
No. 3 Bison	14	7	0	14	35
No. 1 Bobcats	0	3	15	14	32

at Toyota Stadium • Frisco, Texas

- Date: January 6, 2025
- Game time: 5:00 p.m. MST
- Game weather: Clear; 34 °F (1 °C); Wind: NW 7 mph
- Game attendance: 18,005
- Referee: Matt Overton
- TV announcers (ESPN, ESPN+): Dave Flemming (Play-by-Play), Brock Osweiler (color), Stormy Buonantony (sideline reporter)
- Box score

Game information

First quarter

- (7:55) NDSU – Cam Miller 2-yard run (Griffin Crosa kick) (Drive: 12 plays, 75 yards, 7:05; North Dakota State 7–0)
- (1:51) NDSU – Cam Miller 64-yard run (Griffin Crosa kick) (Drive: 5 plays, 92 yards, 3:05; North Dakota State 14–0)

Second quarter

- (5:38) MTST – Myles Sansted 32-yard field goal (Drive: 17 plays, 61 yards, 11:13; North Dakota State 14–3)
- (0:12) NDSU – Bryce Lance 1-yard pass from Cam Miller (Griffin Crosa kick) (Drive: 10 plays, 56 yards, 0:47; North Dakota State 21–3)

Third quarter

- (8:09) MTST – Scottre Humphrey 1-yard run (Myles Sansted kick) (Drive: 11 plays, 75 yards, 6:44; North Dakota State 21–10)
- (4:03) MTST – Rohan Jones 5-yard pass from Tommy Mellott (2-point conversion pass) (Drive: 2 plays, 58 yards, 0:57; North Dakota State 21–18)

Fourth quarter

- (14:18) NDSU – Joe Stoffel 1-yard pass from Cam Miller (Griffin Crosa kick) (Drive: 8 plays, 75 yards, 4:45; North Dakota State 28–18)
- (11:25) MTST – Tommy Mellott 44-yard run (Myles Sansted kick) (Drive: 5 plays, 75 yards, 2:53; North Dakota State 28–25)
- (2:41) NDSU – CharMar Brown 3-yard run (Griffin Crosa kick) (Drive: 9 plays, 66 yards, 5:06; North Dakota State 35–25)
- (1:09) MTST – Taco Dowler 19-yard pass from Tommy Mellott (Myles Sansted kick) (Drive: 10 plays, 73 yards, 1:26; North Dakota State 35–32)

Statistics	NDSU	MTST
First downs	18	19
Total yards	401	393
Rushing yards	202	198
Passing yards	199	195
Passing: Comp–Att–Int	19–23–0	13–24–0
Time of possession	27:53	31:01

Team	Category	Player	Statistics
North Dakota State	Passing	Cam Miller	19/22, 199 yards, 2 TD
North Dakota State	Rushing	Cam Miller	18 carries, 121 yards, 2 TD
North Dakota State	Receiving	Bryce Lance	9 receptions, 107 yards, TD
Montana State	Passing	Tommy Mellott	13/24, 195 yards, 2 TD
Montana State	Rushing	Tommy Mellott	14 carries, 135 yards, TD
Montana State	Receiving	Ryan Lonergan	1 reception, 53 yards
