= Tyler Walker (American football) =

American football coach (born 1989)

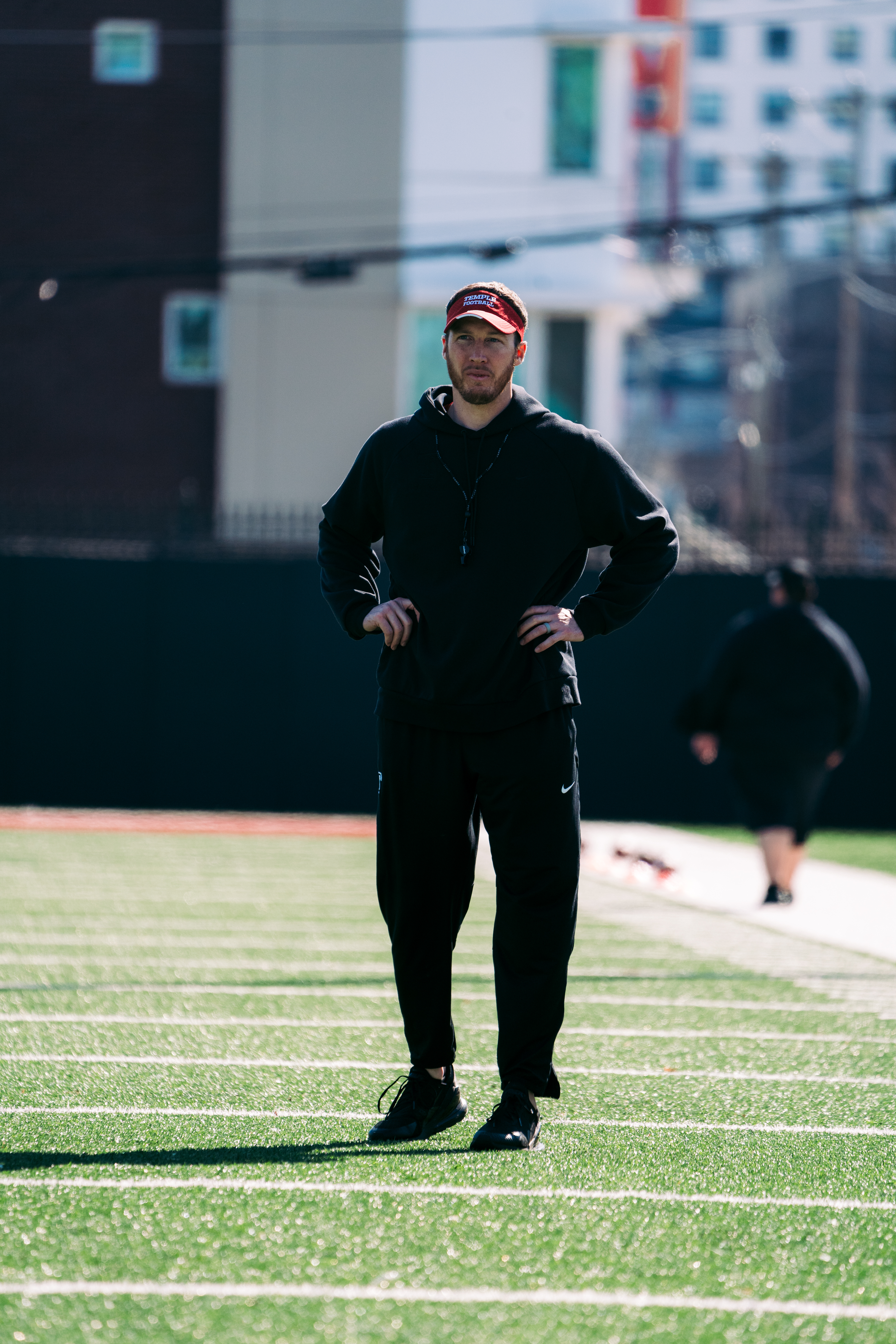
- Walker at Practice 2025

Current position
- Title: Offensive coordinator & quarterbacks coach
- Team: Temple
- Conference: AAC

Biographical details
- Born: April 10, 1989 (age 37); Cincinnati, Ohio, U.S.
- Education: Miami University (2014)

Playing career
- 2008–2009: Bethel (TN)

Coaching career (HC unless noted)
- 2010–2013: Hamilton HS (OH) (OA)
- 2014–2015: Miami (OH) (GA)
- 2016: Davenport (WR/PGC)
- 2017: Catholic Central HS (MI) (WR)
- 2018–2019: Muskingum (STC/DB)
- 2020: Muskingum (DC)
- 2021: Montana State (DOR/ Asst. QB)
- 2022–2023: Montana State (TE/FB)
- 2024: Montana State (OC/QB)
- 2025–present: Temple (OC/QB)

Tyler James Walker (born April 10, 1989) is an American football coach and former player from Hamilton, Ohio. Walker is currently the Offensive coordinator for the Temple Owls. Before Temple Walker was the offensive coordinator for the Montana State Bobcats. Following his first year as Offensive Coordinator at Montana State, Walker was named the 2024 Football Scoop Coordinator of the year.

== Personal life ==
Originally from Hamilton, Ohio, Walker attended Hamilton High School where he played football and ran track. Following high school, Walker attended Bethel University to play football. Walker received his bachelors degree in Special Education from Miami University. He and his wife Aimee have two children, Aspen and Lincoln.

== Coaching career ==
=== Montana State ===
Walker joined the Montana State staff in 2021 as the Assistant Quarterbacks coach. That year the Bobcats played for the FCS National Championship. Walker was then elevated to Tight Ends Coach in 2022. During his two seasons as TE coach he produced one of the most dynamic and accomplished position groups in the FCS. Derryk Snell and Treyton Pickering each earned 1st Team All-Big Sky honors in 2023, with Snell capturing 1st Team All-America honors from Phil Steele. Snell also earned first team all-league honors in 2022.

The 2024 season was Walker's first as Offensive Coordinator for the Bobcats. His offense helped the Bobcats to a 15-1 record and an appearance in the FCS National Championship game. Montana State ranked No. 1 in the FCS in categories like scoring offense (41.3 points per game), red zone offense (96.8 percent conversion rate) and fewest passes intercepted (two). The Bobcats were also No. 2 in rushing offense, total offense and third-down conversion rate, their 51 rushing touchdowns were far and away the most in the nation. Walker mentored Walter Payton Award winner Tommy Mellott, who was also named an AFCA All American in 2024. For his own efforts this season, Walker was voted the Football Scoop FCS Coordinator of the Year. The award was voted on by previous recipients of the award, including Phil Longo, Ryan Carty and Chris Klieman.

Following the Bobcats fall to North Dakota State in the FCS National Championship Game, Walker accepted the same position at Temple University.

=== Temple ===
In January 2025, Walker was hired by K.C Keeler, the new head coach at Temple as the offensive coordinator and quarterbacks coach.

Under Walker's guidance the Temple offense finished the 2025 season ranked No. 2 in the FBS in turnovers lost (4), No. 2 in interceptions thrown (2), No. 3 in fumbles lost (2), No. 5 in fourth down conversion percentage (0.737) and No. 21 in red zone conversion percentage (0.905). Led offense to significant gains in 2025, increasing scoring offense from 19.6 to 27.8, total offense from 308.8 to 344.8 yards per game, total yards from 3,705 to 4,138, rushing yards from 1,113 to 1,769 and touchdowns from 27 to 43, while also increasing fourth down conversion rate by 32 percentage points, from 0.417 in 2024 to 0.737.

Set program records for passing touchdowns (28), fewest turnovers (4), fewest interceptions (2) and fewest fumbles (2). Also posted the highest points per game (27.8) since 2018 and had six players record more than 400 total yards for the first time in a single season.
