= Lan Larison =

American football player (born 2001)

No. 34 – New England Patriots
- Position: Running back
- Roster status: Active

Personal information
- Born: October 11, 2001 (age 25); Caldwell, Idaho, U.S.
- Listed height: 5 ft 11 in (1.80 m)
- Listed weight: 209 lb (95 kg)

Career information
- High school: Vallivue (Caldwell)
- College: UC Davis (2020–2024)
- NFL draft: 2025: undrafted

Career history
- New England Patriots (2025–present)

Awards and highlights
- Big Sky Offensive Player of the Year (2023); 2x First-team FCS All-American (2023, 2024); 3× First-team All-Big Sky (2022–2024); 2× Second-team All-Big Sky (2020, 2021)

Career NFL statistics as of Week 1, 2026
- Receptions: 2
- Receiving yards: 9
- Kickoff return yards: 49
- Stats at Pro Football Reference

Lan Larison (born October 11, 2001) is an American professional football running back for the New England Patriots of the National Football League (NFL). He played college football for the UC Davis Aggies.

== Early life ==
Larison grew up in Caldwell, Idaho and attended Vallivue High School. Larison committed to play college football at UC Davis.

== College career ==
Larison was named second-team All-Big Sky Conference during his freshman season, which was postponed from the fall to the spring of 2021 due to COVID-19. He repeated as a second team All-Big Sky selection as a sophomore after rushing for 255 yards and three touchdowns, catching 18 passes for 241 yards and one touchdown, and returning 23 kickoffs for 688 yards and one touchdown. Larison was named first-team All-Conference as a junior. He was named the Big Sky Offensive Player of the Year after rushing for 1,101 yards and 13 touchdowns. Larison used the extra year of eligibility granted to college athletes due to the COVID-19 pandemic and returned for a fifth season in 2024.

== Professional career ==
Pre-draft measurables
| Height | Weight | Arm length | Hand span | Wingspan | 40-yard dash | 10-yard split | 20-yard split | 20-yard shuttle | Three-cone drill | Vertical jump | Broad jump | Bench press |
|---|---|---|---|---|---|---|---|---|---|---|---|---|
| 5 ft 10 1/2 in (1.79 m) | 209 lb (95 kg) | 30 1/8 in (0.77 m) | 9 3/4 in (0.25 m) | 6 ft 1 3/4 in (1.87 m) | 4.57 s | 1.67 s | 2.70 s | 4.21 s | 6.93 s | 35.5 in (0.90 m) | 9 ft 11 in (3.02 m) | 21 reps |
All values from Pro Day

On May 9, 2025, Larison signed with the New England Patriots as an undrafted free agent after going unselected in the 2025 NFL draft. He was placed on season–ending injured reserve on August 10, after suffering a foot injury in the preseason.

On August 30, 2026, Larison was released by the Patriots as a part of final roster cuts and signed to the practice squad the next day. He was promoted to the active roster on October 31.
