= Myles Sansted =

American football player

No. 39 – Montana State Bobcats
- Position: Placekicker
- Class: Redshirt Sophomore

Personal information
- Listed height: 6 ft 3 in (1.91 m)
- Listed weight: 188 lb (85 kg)

Career information
- High school: Alexandria Area (Alexandria, Minnesota)
- College: Montana State (2024–present)

Awards and highlights
- FCS national champion (2025)
- Stats at ESPN

Myles Sansted is an American college football placekicker for the Montana State Bobcats.

== Early life ==
Sansted was born into an athletic family and grew up playing various sports alongside his twin brother, Peter. His father, Rick, played college soccer and basketball at Augsburg University before serving as the superintendent of Alexandria Public Schools while his mother, Katie (née Reif), ran track and cross country at the University of St. Thomas before she founded KT Design. His mother's twin sister, Molly (née Reif), was a basketball star at North Dakota State University who married college football coach Brent Vigen.

== High school career ==
Sansted attended Alexandria Area High School in Alexandria, Minnesota, where he was a four-sport athlete. In track, he competed in the 400 meters, 800 meters, and the 4 × 800 meters relay. Sansted also played basketball and soccer alongside his brother. As a junior, he hit the game-winning three-pointer that sent his team to the Class 3A state title game, where they subsequently lost to a Chet Holmgren-led Minnehaha Academy team.

Sansted decided to try out for the football team his sophomore year as a kicker, despite never having played organized football before. "I wanted to play another sport with my friends," he said. "I could play soccer and football at the same time." Sansted trained under former Minnesota Golden Gophers kicker Joel Monroe and, as a junior, earned the starting nod for the Alexandria Cardinals. That season, he was named the team's special teams MVP after converting 29-of-32 extra points and 1-of-1 field goal attempts. As a senior, he earned all-district honorable mention after he converted 42-of-45 extra points and 6-of-8 field goal attempts, helping Alexandria reach the MSHSL Class 5A state tournament.

Sansted originally had no intention of playing college football and thus never attended any kicking camps in high school. He received some offers from NCAA Division III programs in Minnesota, but he chose to enroll at Montana State University (MSU) after he received some scholarship money. Sansted also cited family ties to Bozeman and his love for the outdoors as contributing factors to his decision.

== College career ==
In 2023, Sansted joined the Bobcats as a walk-on during the spring semester. He worked out with the team through summer and fall camp, but did not make the final roster. Sansted returned for another try in 2024, but missed most of spring ball due to a quad injury. Sansted recovered in time to compete for the starting nod against 2023 co-starters Brendan Hall and Casey Kautzman throughout summer and fall camp, ultimately earning the job ahead of the 2024 season opener. He helped the Bobcats reach the FCS national championship game, where he made a field goal and three extra point attempts in a loss to North Dakota State. Sansted finished his first season converting 15-of-19 field goals and 83-of-85 extra points, placing second in the Big Sky Conference in scoring with 128 points. He also made a season-long 49-yard field goal in a win over rival Montana in the Brawl of the Wild.
