= Tommy Mellott =

American football player (born 2001)

Profile
- Position: Wide receiver

Personal information
- Born: March 30, 2001 (age 25); Butte, Montana, U.S.
- Listed height: 6 ft 0 in (1.83 m)
- Listed weight: 206 lb (93 kg)

Career information
- High school: Butte (MT)
- College: Montana State (2020–2024)
- NFL draft: 2025: 6th round, 213th overall pick

Career history
- Las Vegas Raiders (2025)*; New Orleans Saints (2025)*
- * Offseason or practice squad member only

Awards and highlights
- Walter Payton Award (2024); First-team FCS All-American (2024); Big Sky Offensive Player of the Year (2024); First-team All-Big Sky (2024); 2× Second-team All-Big Sky (2022, 2023)
- Stats at Pro Football Reference

Tommy Mellott (/məˈlɑt/; born March 30, 2001) is an American professional football wide receiver. He played college football as a quarterback for the Montana State Bobcats and was selected by the Las Vegas Raiders in the sixth round of the 2025 NFL draft.

== Early life ==
Mellott was born and raised in Butte, Montana to parents Shane and Dina Mellott. He attended Butte High School. As a senior, he completed 191 of 300 pass attempts for 2,940 yards and 30 touchdowns while rushing for 1,217 yards and 16 touchdowns. He was named the Montana Gatorade Player of the Year. Mellott committed to play college football at Montana State.

== College career ==
Mellott began his freshman season with the Montana State Bobcats playing wide receiver and on special teams. He took over as the Bobcats starting quarterback prior to the team's game against UT Martin in opening round of the 2021 FCS Playoffs led Montana State to the 2022 NCAA Division I Football Championship Game. Mellott suffered a serious ankle injury on the first offensive drive of the game and the team lost 38–10 to North Dakota State. Mellott finished the season with 484 passing yards and four touchdown passes while also rushing for 716 yards and eight touchdowns.

As a sophomore, Mellott was named second-team All-Big Sky Conference after he passed for 1,698 yards and 10 touchdowns with 4 interceptions and rushed for 1,071 yards and 13 touchdowns. He repeated as a second-team All-Big Sky selection as a junior despite missing time due to injury and finished the season with 1,064 passing yards and 10 touchdowns with two interceptions and 689 rushing yards and five touchdowns.

Mellott’s first major game of his junior season came against Sacramento State, where he led the team in passing Mellott with 99 yards and ran for 2 touchdowns on the ground as the Bobcats held their own against the number 3 ranked Hornets, winning 42-30. Mellott and the Bobcats would be upset the next week by the number 9 ranked Idaho Vandals in a 24-21 loss. Montana State would go on to the postseason, where they would lose to the North Dakota State Bison in overtime 35-34 in the second round. Mellott would earn his second consecutive second-team All-Big Sky appearance during his junior season.

Mellott started off his senior season leading the Bobcats to a 35-31 upset victory in week 0 over New Mexico. Mellott and the Bobcats would carry through 11 straight wins, ending the regular season with a 12-0 record. Montana State would reach the FCS Championship Game, but would lose to North Dakota State 35-32.

=== Statistics ===
Season	Team	Games			Passing								Rushing			
Season	Team	GP	GS	Record	Cmp	Att	Pct	Yds	Avg	TD	INT	Rtg	Att	Yds	Avg	TD
2020	Montana State	Redshirt (redshirt)														
2021	Montana State	12	4	3–1	28	53	52.8	484	9.1	4	0	154.4	113	716	6.3	10
2022	Montana State	12	12	10–2	128	210	61.0	1,698	8.1	10	4	140.1	170	1,071	6.3	13
2023	Montana State	9	9	5–4	75	119	63.0	1,068	9.0	10	2	162.8	85	690	8.1	5
2024	Montana State	16	16	15–1	204	301	67.8	2,783	9.2	31	2	178.1	123	1,050	8.5	15
Career		49	41	33–8	435	683	63.7	6,016	8.8	55	8	161.9	488	3,517	7.2	43

== Professional career ==
Pre-draft measurables
Height	Weight	Arm length	Hand span	40-yard dash	10-yard split	20-yard split	20-yard shuttle	Three-cone drill	Vertical jump	Broad jump	Bench press
5 ft 11 5/8 in (1.82 m)	200 lb (91 kg)	29 1/8 in (0.74 m)	8 7/8 in (0.23 m)	4.39 s	1.50 s	2.56 s	4.20 s	6.93 s	41.0 in (1.04 m)	10 ft 4 in (3.15 m)	19 reps
All values from Pro Day

=== Las Vegas Raiders ===
Mellott was selected by the Las Vegas Raiders with the 213th overall pick in the sixth round of the 2025 NFL draft. Mellott changed positions to wide receiver after being drafted by the Raiders. He was waived on August 26 as part of final roster cuts.

=== New Orleans Saints ===
On September 1, 2025, Mellott was signed to the New Orleans Saints' practice squad. He was released on October 7.
