= Rohan Jones =

Canadian gridiron football player (born 2001)

- Jones with the Montreal Alouettes in 2026

No. 11 – Montreal Alouettes
- Position: Tight end
- CFL status: National

Personal information
- Born: October 7, 2001 (age 25); Montreal, Quebec, Canada
- Listed height: 6 ft 2 in (1.88 m)
- Listed weight: 236 lb (107 kg)

Career information
- High school: Collège André-Grasset (Montreal, Quebec)
- College: Maine (2022–2023); Montana State (2024); Arkansas (2025)
- NFL draft: 2026: undrafted
- CFL draft: 2026: 1st round, 8th overall pick

Career history
- Los Angeles Rams (2026)*; Montreal Alouettes (2026–present)
- * Offseason or practice squad member only

Awards and highlights
- First-team FCS All-American (2024); Second-team All-SEC (2025)
- Stats at Pro Football Reference

Rohan Jones (born October 7, 2001) is a Canadian professional football tight end for the Montreal Alouettes of the Canadian Football League (CFL). He played college football at Maine, Montana State, and Arkansas.

== Early life ==
Jones was born in Montreal, Quebec, and attended Collège André-Grasset in Montreal.

== College career ==
=== Maine ===
Jones began his collegiate career at Maine, where he appeared in 11 games during the 2023 season and had 22 receptions for 240 yards and five touchdowns. He also returned 17 kickoffs for 377 yards.

=== Montana State ===
Jones transferred to Montana State for the 2024 season. He played in 14 games and posted 30 receptions for 470 yards and nine touchdowns, earning First‑Team All‑Big Sky honors.

=== Arkansas ===
Jones transferred to Arkansas for his senior season in 2025. He appeared in 12 games and had 19 receptions for 519 yards and four touchdowns, along with one rushing touchdown.

Across his college career, Jones totaled 71 receptions for 1,229 yards and 18 receiving touchdowns, along with one rushing touchdown.

== Professional career ==
Pre-draft measurables
Height	Weight	Arm length	Hand span	Wingspan	40-yard dash	10-yard split	20-yard split	20-yard shuttle	Three-cone drill	Vertical jump	Broad jump	Bench press
6 ft 2 1/8 in (1.88 m)	238 lb (108 kg)	31 in (0.79 m)	9 1/2 in (0.24 m)	6 ft 2 3/4 in (1.90 m)	4.75 s	1.72 s	2.84 s	4.50 s	7.15 s	32.5 in (0.83 m)	9 ft 10 in (3.00 m)	25 reps
All values from Pro Day

=== Los Angeles Rams ===
On April 29, 2026, Jones signed a three‑year, $3.11 million contract with the Los Angeles Rams as an undrafted free agent. He was waived by Los Angeles on August 29.

=== Montreal Alouettes ===
Jones was ranked as the sixth-best prospect of ahead of the 2026 CFL draft, where he was selected in the first round (8th overall) by the Montreal Alouettes. On September 5, 2026, it was announced that Jones had signed a three-year contract with the Alouettes.
