= 2024 Air Force Falcons football team =

American college football season

2024 Air Force Falcons football
- Conference: Mountain West Conference
- Record: 5–7 (3–4 MW)
- Head coach: Troy Calhoun (18th season)
- Offensive coordinator: Mike Thiessen (16th season)
- Offensive scheme: Triple option
- Defensive coordinator: Brian Knorr (3rd season)
- Base defense: 3–4
- Home stadium: Falcon Stadium

Uniform
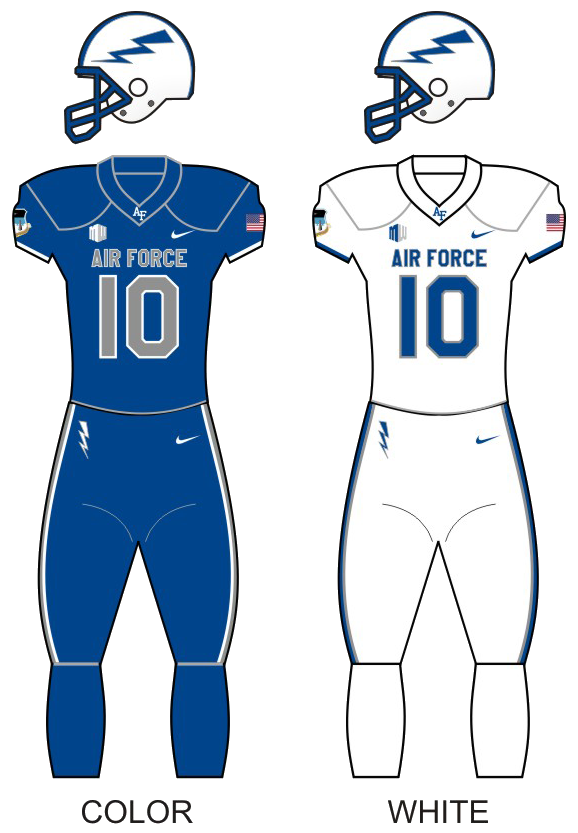

2024 Mountain West Conference football standings
	Conf.			Overall
Team	W		L	W		L
No. 8 Boise State y$^	7	–	0	12	–	2
No. 23 UNLV y	6	–	1	11	–	3
Colorado State	6	–	1	8	–	5
Fresno State	4	–	3	6	–	7
San Jose State	3	–	4	7	–	6
Air Force	3	–	4	5	–	7
Hawaii	3	–	4	5	–	7
New Mexico	3	–	4	5	–	7
Utah State	3	–	4	4	–	8
San Diego State	2	–	5	3	–	9
Wyoming	2	–	5	3	–	9
Nevada	0	–	7	3	–	10
Championship: Boise State 21, UNLV 7
^ – College Football Playoff participant; $ – Conference champion; y – Championship game participant; Rankings from AP Poll

The 2024 Air Force Falcons football team represented the United States Air Force Academy as a member of the Mountain West Conference (MW) during the 2024 NCAA Division I FBS football season. Led by 18th-year head coach Troy Calhoun, the Falcons compiled an overall record of 5–7 with a mark of 3–4, placing in five-way tie for fifth in the MW. The team played home games at Falcon Stadium on the Academy grounds north of Colorado Springs, Colorado

Despite a 1–7 start, the Falcons finished the season on a high note with four consecutive wins.

== Schedule ==
Date	Time	Opponent	Site	TV	Result	Attendance
August 31	1:30 p.m.	Merrimack*	Falcon Stadium; USAF Academy, CO	CBSSN	W 21–6	31,658
September 7	5:00 p.m.	San Jose State	Falcon Stadium; USAF Academy, CO	CBSSN	L 7–17	22,478
September 14	5:30 p.m.	at Baylor*	McLane Stadium; Waco, TX	FS1	L 3–38	46,212
September 28	6:00 p.m.	at Wyoming	War Memorial Stadium; Laramie, WY	CBSSN	L 19–31	23,068
October 5	10:00 a.m.	Navy*	Falcon Stadium; USAF Academy, CO (Commander-in-Chief's Trophy)	CBS	L 7–34	39,441
October 12	5:00 p.m.	at New Mexico	University Stadium; Albuquerque, NM	TruTV	L 37–52	15,561
October 19	6:00 p.m.	Colorado State	Falcon Stadium; USAF Academy, CO (rivalry)	CBSSN	L 13–21	27,598
November 2	10:00 a.m.	at No. 21 Army*	Michie Stadium; West Point, NY (Commander-in-Chief's Trophy)	CBS	L 3–20	30,046
November 9	7:45 p.m.	Fresno State	Falcon Stadium; USAF Academy, CO	FS1	W 36–28	14,794
November 16	1:30 p.m.	Oregon State*	Falcon Stadium; USAF Academy, CO	CBSSN	W 28–0	21,385
November 23	8:30 p.m.	at Nevada	Mackay Stadium; Reno, NV	FS1	W 22–19	12,228
November 30	8:30 p.m.	at San Diego State	Snapdragon Stadium; San Diego, CA	FS1	W 31–20	18,045
*Non-conference game; Rankings from AP Poll (and CFP Rankings, after October 31) - Released prior to game; All times are in Mountain time

== Preseason ==
=== Mountain West media poll ===
The Mountain West's preseason prediction poll was released on July 10, 2024.

Mountain West media poll
Predicted finish	Team	Votes (1st place)
1	Boise State	543 (38)
2	UNLV	471 (4)
3	Fresno State	460 (4)
4	Air Force	384
5	Colorado State	337
6	Wyoming	296
7	Utah State	285
8	San Diego State	251
9	Hawaii	214
10	San Jose State	185
11	New Mexico	85
12	Nevada	77

== Game summaries ==
=== vs Merrimack ===
Merrimack Warriors (FCS) (0–0) vs Air Force Falcons (0–0) – Game summary

Quarter	1	2	3	4	Total
Warriors (FCS)	0	0	0	6	6
Falcons	7	7	0	7	21

at Falcon Stadium • Colorado Springs, CO

- Date: August 31, 2024
- Game time: 1:33 p.m.
- Game weather: Sunny, 83 °F (28 °C)
- Game attendance: 31,658
- Referee: Kenneth Ray
- TV announcers (CBSSN): Chris Lewis (play-by-play) and Robert Turbin (analyst)

Game information

First quarter

- (6:02) AF – Cade Harris 2 yard run, Matthew Dapore kick (Drive: 13 plays, 38 yards, 6:51; Air Force 7–0)

Second quarter

- (0:16) AF – Cade Harris 4 yard run, Matthew Dapore kick (Drive: 11 plays, 80 yards, 1:32; Air Force 14–0)

Third quarter

No scoring

Fourth quarter

- (8:31) AF – Aiden Calvert 1 yard run, Matthew Dapore kick (Drive: 6 plays, 14 yards, 3:12; Air Force 21–0)
- (0:00) MER – Jalen McDonald 11 yard pass from Ayden Pereira (Drive: 15 plays, 50 yards, 3:40; Air Force 21–6)

Statistics	MRMK	AFA
First downs	10	15
Total yards	57–217	69–237
Rushing yards	27–114	55–166
Passing yards	103	71
Passing: Comp–Att–Int	17–30–0	6–14–0
Time of possession	26:56	33:04

Team	Category	Player	Statistics
Merrimack	Passing	Malakai Anthony	14/21, 74 yards
Merrimack	Rushing	Jermaine Corbett	8 carries, 59 yards
Merrimack	Receiving	Jalen McDonald	5 receptions, 39 yards, 1 TD
Air Force	Passing	John Busha	6/14, 71 yards
Air Force	Rushing	Owen Allen	16 carries, 63 yards
Air Force	Receiving	Aiden Calvert	1 reception, 21 yards

=== vs San Jose State ===
San Jose State Spartans (1–0) vs Air Force Falcons (1–0) – Game summary

Quarter	1	2	3	4	Total
Spartans	14	0	0	3	17
Falcons	7	0	0	0	7

at Falcon Stadium • Colorado Springs, CO

- Date: September 7, 2024
- Game time: 5:02 P.M.
- Game weather: Sunny, 81 °F (27 °C)
- Game attendance: 22,478
- Referee: Patrick Foy
- TV announcers (CBSSN): Chris Lewis (play-by-play) and Taylor McHargue (analyst)

Game information

First quarter

- (11:23) SJSU – Nick Nash 18 yard pass from Emmett Brown, Kyler Halvorsen kick (Drive: 8 plays, 75 yards, 3:37; San Jose State 7–0)
- (5:29) AF – Cade Harris 6 yard run, Matthew Dapore kick (Drive: 4 plays, 14 yards, 2:21; Tied 7–7)
- (4:06) SJSU – Jackson Canaan 58 yard pass from Emmett Brown, Kyler Halvorsen kick (Drive: 4 plays, 75 yards, 1:23; San Jose State 14–7)

Second quarter

No scoring

Third quarter

No scoring

Fourth quarter

- (8:25) SJSU – Kyler Halvorsen 34 yard field goal (Drive: 12 plays, 63 yards, 7:07; San Jose State 17–7)

Statistics	SJSU	AFA
First downs	15	10
Total yards	67–312	66–197
Rushing yards	34–50	46–143
Passing yards	262	54
Passing: Comp–Att–Int	17–33–1	7–20–2
Time of possession	30:37	29:23

Team	Category	Player	Statistics
San Jose State	Passing	Emmett Brown	17/32, 262 yards, 2 TD, 1 INT
San Jose State	Rushing	Floyd Chalk IV	15 carries, 43 yards
San Jose State	Receiving	Nick Nash	7 receptions, 90 yards, 1 TD
Air Force	Passing	John Busha	7/20, 54 yards, 2 INT
Air Force	Rushing	Cade Harris	8 carries, 50 yards, 1 TD
Air Force	Receiving	Quin Smith	3 receptions, 36 yards

=== at Baylor ===
Air Force Falcons (1–1) at Baylor Bears (1–1) – Game summary

Quarter	1	2	3	4	Total
Falcons	0	3	0	0	3
Bears	3	3	17	8	31

at McLane Stadium • Waco, TX

- Date: September 14, 2024
- Game time: 5:30 p.m.
- Game weather: 0 °F (−18 °C)
- Game attendance: 46,212
- TV announcers (FS1): Alex Faust (play-by-play) and Robert Smith (analyst)

Game information

First quarter
Second quarter
Third quarter
Fourth quarter

Statistics	AFA	BAY
First downs		
Total yards		
Rushing yards		
Passing yards		
Passing: Comp–Att–Int		
Time of possession		

Team	Category	Player	Statistics
Air Force	Passing		
Air Force	Rushing		
Air Force	Receiving		
Baylor	Passing		
Baylor	Rushing		
Baylor	Receiving		

=== at Wyoming ===
Air Force Falcons (1–2) at Wyoming Cowboys (0–4) – Game summary

Quarter	1	2	3	4	Total
Falcons	0	13	0	6	19
Cowboys	7	0	14	10	31

at War Memorial Stadium • Laramie, WY

- Date: September 28, 2024
- Game time: 6:00 p.m.
- Game weather: Sunny, 78 °F (26 °C)
- Game attendance: 23,068
- Referee: Nolan Dumas
- TV announcers (CBSSN): Rich Waltz (play-by-play), Robert Turbin (analyst), and Amanda Guerra (sideline)

Game information

First quarter

- (9:36) WYO – Sam Scott 8 yard run, John Hoyland kick (Drive: 6 plays, 46 yards, 2:17; WYO 7–0)

Second quarter

- (14:56) AFA – Matthew Dapore 28 yard field goal (Drive: 12 plays, 72 yards, 6:34; WYO 7–3)
- (6:47) AFA – Kade Frew 4 yard run, Matthew Dapore kick (Drive: 9 plays, 81 yards, 5:42; AFA 10–7)
- (0:23) AFA – Matthew Dapore 27 yard field goal (Drive: 9 plays, 54 yards, 2:41; AFA 13–7)

Third quarter

- (11:54) WYO – Evan Svoboda 1 yard run, John Hoyland kick (Drive: 7 plays, 76 yards, 2:58; WYO 14–13)
- (3:32) WYO – Tyler King 3 yard run, John Hoyland kick (Drive: 11 plays, 94 yards, 5:56; WYO 21–13)

Fourth quarter

- (10:36) WYO – John Hoyland 23 yard field goal (Drive: 13 plays, 61 yards, 6:31; WYO 24–13)
- (7:00) AFA – Aiden Calvert 37 yard run, failed 2 point conversion (Drive: 7 plays, 75 yards, 3:36; WYO 24–19)
- (2:13) WYO – Evan Svoboda 17 yard run, John Hoyland kick (Drive: 9 plays, 75 yards, 4:47; WYO 31–19)

Statistics	AFA	WYO
First downs	19	19
Total yards	320	361
Rushing yards	205	173
Passing yards	115	188
Passing: Comp–Att–Int	6–13–0	16–22–0
Time of possession	28:32	31:28

Team	Category	Player	Statistics
Air Force	Passing	John Busha	6/13, 115 yards
Air Force	Rushing	Aiden Calvert	3 carries, 54 yards, 1 TD
Air Force	Receiving	Cade Harris	5 receptions, 106 yards
Wyoming	Passing	Evan Svoboda	15/21, 165 yards
Wyoming	Rushing	Sam Scott	19 carries, 97 yards, 1 TD
Wyoming	Receiving	Chris Durr	3 receptions, 71 yards

=== vs Navy ===
Navy Midshipmen (4–0) vs Air Force Falcons (1–3) – Game summary

Quarter	1	2	3	4	Total
Midshipmen	14	7	6	7	34
Falcons	0	7	0	0	7

at Falcon Stadium • Colorado Springs, CO

- Date: October 5, 2024
- Game time: 10:00 a.m.
- Game weather: Temperature: 72 °F (22 °C) • Wind: N/A • Weather: Sunny
- Game attendance: 39,441
- Referee: Tim Rich
- TV announcers (CBS): Rich Waltz (play-by-play), Ross Tucker (analyst), and Tiffany Blackmon (sideline reporter)

Game information

First quarter

- (6:25) NAVY – Blake Horvath 1-yard run, Nathan Kirkwood kick (Drive: 10 plays, 87 yards, 4:39; Navy 7–0)
- (2:34) NAVY – Nathan Kent 34-yard run, Nathan Kirkwood kick (Drive: 4 plays, 41 yards, 1:42; Navy 14–0)

Second quarter

- (11:09) AF – Tre Roberson 45-yard pass from Quentin Hayes (Drive: 5 plays, 81 yards, 2:21; Navy 14–7)
- (2:37) NAVY – Blake Horvath 2-yard run, Nathan Kirkwood kick (Drive: 8 plays, 79 yards, 4:17; Navy 21–7)

Third quarter

- (6:08) Navy – Alex Tecza 7-yard run, Nathan Kirkwood kick (Drive: 5 plays, 75 yards, 3:09; Navy 27–7)

Fourth quarter

- (6:58) Navy – Alex Tecza 12-yard run, Nathan Kirkwood kick (Drive: 5 plays, 75 yards, 3:09; Navy 34–7)

Statistics	NAVY	AFA
First downs	21	14
Total yards	463	273
Rushing yards	329	158
Passing yards	134	115
Passing: Comp–Att–Int	9–15–0	5–9–1
Time of possession	30:34	29:26

Team	Category	Player	Statistics
Navy	Passing	Blake Horvath	9/15, 134 yards
Navy	Rushing	Blake Horvath	18 carries, 115 yards, 2 TD
Navy	Receiving	Eli Heidenreich	5 receptions, 101 yards
Air Force	Passing	Quentin Hayes	5/6, 115 yards, TD
Air Force	Rushing	Kade Frew	4 carries, 29 yards
Air Force	Receiving	Tre Roberson	1 reception, 45 yards, TD

=== at New Mexico ===
Game Six – Air Force Falcons (1–4) at New Mexico Lobos (1–4) – Game summary

Quarter	1	2	3	4	Total
Falcons	3	14	0	20	37
Lobos	7	21	17	7	52

at University Stadium, Albuquerque, New Mexico

- Date: Saturday October 12, 2024
- Game time: 5:00 p.m. MDT
- Game weather: Clear • Temperature: 86 °F (30 °C) • Wind: SW 4 mph
- Game attendance: 15,561
- Referee: Michael Cuttone
- TV announcers (TruTV): JB Long (play-by-play), Mike Golic Jr. (analyst), and Bridget Howard (sideline reporter)

Game information

First quarter

- AFA – Matthew Dapore 43-yard field goal, 4:49. Falcons 3–0. Drive: 17 plays, 54 yards, 9:28.
- UNM – Devon Dampier 7-yard run (Luke Drzewiecki kick), 0:14. Lobos 7–3. Drive: 11 plays, 75 yards, 4:35.

Second quarter

- UNM – Luke Wysong 57-yard punt return (Luke Drzewiecki kick), 13:32. Lobos 14–3. Drive: 3 plays, -3 yards, 1:42.
- AFA – Cade Harris 5-yard run (Matthew Dapore kick), 7:44. Lobos 14–10. Drive: 11 plays, 75 yards, 5:48.
- UNM – Nic Trujillo 18-yard pass from Devon Dampier (Luke Drzewiecki kick), 5:05. Lobos 21–10. Drive: 6 plays, 72 yards, 2:31.
- AFA – Tylor Latham 4-yard run (Matthew Dapore kick), 2:46. Lobos 21–17. Drive: 5 plays, 75 yards, 2:19.
- UNM – Devon Dampier 2-yard run (Luke Drzewiecki kick), 0:11. Lobos 28–17. Drive: 11 plays, 75 yards, 2:35.

Third quarter

- UNM – Sol-Jay Maiava-Peters 15-yard run (Luke Drzewiecki kick), 12:49. Lobos 35–17. Drive: 2 plays, 32 yards, 0:30.
- UNM – Luke Drzewiecki 24-yard field goal, 5:37. Lobos 38–17. Drive: 7 plays, 42 yards, 3:12.
- UNM – Eli Sanders 31-yard run (Luke Drzewiecki kick), 1:25. Lobos 45–17. Drive: 3 plays, 44 yards, 1:06.

Fourth quarter

- AFA – Quentin Hayes 18-yard run (Matthew Dapore kick), 12:31. Lobos 45–24. Drive: 9 plays, 75 yards, 3:54.
- UNM – Eli Sanders 35-yard run (Luke Drzewiecki kick), 10:54. Lobos 52–24. Drive: 4 plays, 28 yards, 1:37.
- AFA – Kemper Hodges 11-yard run (Matthew Dapore), 8:27. Lobos 52–31. Drive: 6 plays, 67 yards, 2:21.
- AFA – Quin Smith 39-yard pass from Josh Johnson (pass failed), 2:18. Lobos 52–37. Drive: 5 plays, 73 yards, 1:23.

Statistics	AFA	UNM
First downs	21	21
Total yards	474	434
Rushing yards	325	255
Passing yards	149	179
Turnovers	1	0
Time of possession	35:59	24:01

Team	Category	Player	Statistics
Air Force	Passing	Quentin Hayes	4/7, 79 yards
Air Force	Rushing	Quentin Hayes	18 carries, 103 yards, TD
Air Force	Receiving	Quin Smith	3 receptions, 82 yards, TD
New Mexico	Passing	Devon Dampier	14/19, 179 yards, TD
New Mexico	Rushing	Eli Sanders	5 carries, 80 yards, 2 TD
New Mexico	Receiving	Nic Trujillo	4 receptions, 85 yards, TD

=== vs Colorado State ===
Colorado State Rams (3–3) vs Air Force Falcons (1–5) – Game summary

Quarter	1	2	3	4	Total
Rams	0	14	7	0	21
Falcons	0	0	0	13	13

at Falcon Stadium • Colorado Springs, CO

- Date: October 19, 2024
- Game time: 6:00 p.m.
- Game weather: Sunny
- Game attendance: 27,598
- Referee: Kenneth Ray
- TV announcers (CBSSN): Chris Lewis (play-by-play) and Robert Turbin (analyst)

Game information

First quarter

No scoring plays

Second quarter

- CSU – Vince Brown II 23-yard pass from Kobe Johnson (Jordan Noyes kick), 5:28. Rams 7–0. Drive: 3 plays, 41 yards, 1:30.
- CSU – Jalen Dupree 1-yard run (Jordan Noyes kick), 2:47. Rams 14–0. Drive: 5 plays, 28 yards, 2:28.

Third quarter

- CSU – Caleb Goodie 85-yard pass from Brayden Fowler-Nicolosi (Jordan Noyes kick), 11:02. Rams 21–0. Drive: 3 plays, 90 yards, 0:53.

Fourth quarter

- AF – Tylor Latham 33-yard pass from John Busha (Matthew Dapore kick), 11:49. Rams 21–7. Drive: 4 plays, 73 yards, 1:28.
- AF – John Busha 1-yard run (run failed), 5:50. Rams 21–13. Drive: 10 plays, 75 yards, 3:48.

Statistics	CSU	AFA
First downs	15	19
Total yards	406	348
Rushing yards	205	173
Passing yards	201	175
Passing: Comp–Att–Int	12–22–0	10–26–2
Time of possession	28:44	31:16

Team	Category	Player	Statistics
Colorado State	Passing	Brayden Fowler-Nicolosi	11/21, 178 yards, TD
Colorado State	Rushing	Avery Morrow	20 carries, 132 yards
Colorado State	Receiving	Caleb Goodie	3 receptions, 103 yards, TD
Air Force	Passing	John Busha	10/25, 175 yards, TD, 2 INT
Air Force	Rushing	Dylan Carson	12 carries, 60 yards
Air Force	Receiving	Tylor Latham	3 receptions, 51 yards, TD

=== at Army ===
Air Force Falcons (1–6) at No. 21 Army Black Knights (7–0) – Game summary

Quarter	1	2	3	4	Total
Falcons	0	3	0	0	3
No. 21 Black Knights	3	3	7	7	20

at Michie Stadium • West Point, NY

- Date: November 2, 2024
- Game time: 10:00 a.m.
- Game weather: Sunny • Temperature: 56 °F (13 °C) • Wind: NW 8 miles per hour (13 km/h)
- Game attendance: 30,046
- Referee: Cal McNeill
- TV announcers (CBS): Rich Waltz (play-by-play), Ross Tucker (analyst), and Tiffany Blackmon (sideline reporter)

Game information

First quarter

- (6:35) ARMY – Trey Gronotte 30-yard field goal (Drive: 11 plays, 57 yards, 6:13; Army 3–0)

Second quarter

- (12:37) ARMY – Trey Gronotte 32-yard field goal (Drive: 8 plays, 29 yards, 3:51; Army 6–0)
- (1:47) AFA – Matthew Dapore 32-yard field goal (Drive: 11 plays, 49 yards, 5:13; Army 6–3)

Third quarter

- (9:59) ARMY – Kanye Udoh 12-yard run, Trey Gronotte kick (Drive: 9 plays, 65 yards, 5:01; Army 13–3)

Fourth quarter

- (1:46) ARMY – Kanye Udoh 25-yard run, Trey Gronotte kick (Drive: 1 play, 25 yards, 0:05; Army 20–3)

Statistics	AFA	ARMY
First downs	15	14
Total yards	209	255
Rushing yards	117	207
Passing yards	92	48
Passing: Comp–Att–Int	10–20–3	5–9–0
Time of possession	31:51	28:09

Team	Category	Player	Statistics
Air Force	Passing	Quentin Hayes	7/14, 54 yards, INT
Air Force	Rushing	Quentin Hayes	22 carries, 61 yards
Air Force	Receiving	Cade Harris	5 receptions, 52 yards
Army	Passing	Dewayne Coleman	5/8, 48 yards
Army	Rushing	Kanye Udoh	22 carries, 158 yards, 2 TD
Army	Receiving	Casey Reynolds	1 reception, 24 yards

=== vs Fresno State ===
Fresno State Bulldogs (5–4) vs Air Force Falcons (1–7) – Game summary

Quarter	1	2	3	4	Total
Bulldogs	7	14	0	7	28
Falcons	7	10	9	10	36

at Falcon Stadium • Colorado Springs, CO

- Date: November 9, 2024
- Game time: 7:45 p.m.
- Game weather: Clear • Temperature: 26 °F (−3 °C) • Wind: NW 7 miles per hour (11 km/h)
- Game attendance: 14,794
- Referee: Patrick Foy
- TV announcers (FS1): Chris Vosters (play-by-play) and Charles Arbuckle (analyst)

Game information

First quarter

- (11:01) FRES – Elijah Gilliam 1-yard run, Dylan Lynch kick (Drive: 7 plays, 59 yards, 3:52; Fresno State 7–0)
- (0:06) AFA – Dylan Carson 1-yard run, Matthew Dapore kick (Drive: 19 plays, 75 yards, 10:50; Tied 7–7)

Second quarter

- (4:45) AFA – Cade Harris 3-yard pass from Quentin Hayes, Matthew Dapore kick (Drive: 14 plays, 59 yards, 8:20; Air Force 14–7)
- (3:47) FRES – Mac Dalena 73-yard pass from Mikey Keene, Dylan Lynch kick (Drive: 3 plays, 75 yards, 0:58; Tied 14–14)
- (1:37) FRES – Jalen Moss 19-yard pass from Mikey Keene, Dylan Lynch kick (Drive: 3 plays, 34 yards, 0:46; Fresno State 21–14)
- (0:00) AFA – Matthew Dapore 35-yard field goal (Drive: 11 plays, 53 yards, 1:42; Fresno State 21–17)

Third quarter

- (9:46) AFA – Matthew Dapore 37-yard field goal (Drive: 9 plays, 56 yards, 5:14; Fresno State 21–20)
- (2:30) AFA – Quentin Haynes 2-yard run, two-point conversion failed (Drive: 11 plays, 42 yards, 6:29; Air Force 26–21)

Fourth quarter

- (8:51) AFA – Quentin Haynes 1-yard run, Michael Dapore kick (Drive: 12 plays, 64 yards, 6:39; Air Force 33–21)
- (1:56) AFA – Matthew Dapore 36-yard field goal (Drive: 8 plays, 6 yards, 3:57; Air Force 36–21)
- (0:38) FRES – Mac Dalena 6-yard pass from Mikey Keene, Dylan Lynch kick (Drive: 9 plays, 75 yards, 1:18; Air Force 36–28)

Statistics	FRES	AFA
First downs	14	24
Total yards	284	358
Rushing yards	-5	344
Passing yards	289	14
Passing: Comp–Att–Int	23–26–1	2–6–0
Time of possession	14:52	45:08

Team	Category	Player	Statistics
Fresno State	Passing	Mikey Keene	23/26, 289 yards, 3 TD, INT
Fresno State	Rushing	Elijah Gilliam	4 carries, 15 yards, TD
Fresno State	Receiving	Mac Dalena	4 receptions, 89 yards. 2 TD
Air Force	Passing	Quentin Hayes	2/6, 14 yards, TD
Air Force	Rushing	Dylan Carson	33 carries, 120 yards, TD
Air Force	Receiving	Brandon Engel	1 reception, 11 yards

=== vs Oregon State ===
Oregon State Beavers (4–5) vs Air Force Falcons (2–7) – Game summary

Quarter	1	2	3	4	Total
Beavers	0	0	0	0	0
Falcons	0	0	0	0	0

at Falcon Stadium • Colorado Springs, CO

- Date: November 16, 2024
- Game time: 1:30 p.m.
- Game weather: 0 °F (−18 °C)
- TV announcers (CBSSN): Jordan Kent (play-by-play), Logan Ryan (analyst), and Tina Cervasio (sideline)

Game information

First quarter
Second quarter
Third quarter
Fourth quarter

Statistics	OSU	AFA
First downs		
Total yards		
Rushing yards		
Passing yards		
Passing: Comp–Att–Int		
Time of possession		

Team	Category	Player	Statistics
Oregon State	Passing		
Oregon State	Rushing		
Oregon State	Receiving		
Air Force	Passing		
Air Force	Rushing		
Air Force	Receiving		

=== at Nevada ===
Game Eleven – Air Force Falcons (3–7) vs Nevada Wolf Pack (3–8) – Game summary

Quarter	1	2	3	4	Total
Falcons	0	0	0	0	0
Wolf Pack	0	0	0	0	0

at Mackay Stadium • Reno, NV

- Date: Saturday November 23, 2024
- Game time: 8:30 p.m.
- Game weather: 0 °F (−18 °C)
- TV announcers (FS1): Trent Rush (play-by-play) and Petros Papadakis (analyst)

Game information

First quarter
Second quarter
Third quarter
Fourth quarter

Statistics	AFA	NEV
First downs		
Total yards		
Rushing yards		
Passing yards		
Passing: Comp–Att–Int		
Time of possession		

Team	Category	Player	Statistics
Air Force	Passing		
Air Force	Rushing		
Air Force	Receiving		
Nevada	Passing		
Nevada	Rushing		
Nevada	Receiving		

=== at San Diego State ===
Air Force Falcons (4–7) at San Diego State Aztecs (3–8) – Game summary

Quarter	1	2	3	4	Total
Falcons	14	3	14	0	31
Aztecs	7	7	0	6	20

at Snapdragon Stadium • San Diego, CA

- Date: November 30, 2024
- Game time: 8:30 p.m.
- Game weather: Clear, 58 °F (14 °C), calm wind
- Game attendance: 18,045
- Referee: Jonathan Noli
- TV announcers (FS1): Evan Lepler (play-by-play) and Charles Arbuckle (analyst)

Game information

First quarter

- AFA (10:02) – Dylan Carson 1 yard run (Matthew Dapore kick); 9 plays, 81 yards, 4:55 (Air Force 7-0)
- SDSU (6:00) – Marquez Cooper 7 yard run (Gabriel Plascencia kick); 10 plays, 76 yards, 3:57 (Tied 7-7)
- AFA (0:29) – Quentin Hayes 1 yard run (Matthew Dapore kick); 10 plays, 75 yards, 5:31 (Air Force 14-7)

Second quarter

- AFA (6:31) – Matthew Dapore 45 yard field goal; 10 plays, 62 yards, 6:02 (Air Force 17-7)
- SDSU (6:00) – Marquez Cooper 2 yard run (Gabriel Plascencia kick); 14 plays, 83 yards, 6:01 (Air Force 17-14)

Third quarter

- AFA (8:03) – Cade Harris 76 yard pass from Quentin Hayes (Matthew Dapore kick); 4 plays, 88 yards, 2:01 (Air Force 24-14)
- AFA (1:00) – Dylan Carson 14 yard run (Matthew Dapore kick); 10 plays, 66 yards, 5:37 (Air Force 31-14)

Fourth quarter

- SDSU (13:54) – Marquez Cooper 8 yard pass from Danny O'Neil (Two-point run conversion failed); 7 plays, 74 yards, 2:00 (Air Force 31-20)

Statistics	AFA	SDSU
First downs	21	24
Total yards	54–404	68–356
Rushing yards	52–276	35–120
Passing yards	128	236
Passing: Comp–Att–Int	2–2–0	25–33–0
Time of possession	31:21	28:39

Team	Category	Player	Statistics
Air Force	Passing	Quentin Hayes	1/1, 76 yards, TD
Air Force	Rushing	Dylan Carson	24 carries, 125 yards, 2 TD
Air Force	Receiving	Cade Harris	1 reception, 76 yards, TD
San Diego State	Passing	Danny O'Neil	24/32, 230 yards, TD
San Diego State	Rushing	Marquez Cooper	23 carries, 94 yards, 2 TD
San Diego State	Receiving	Louis Brown IV	3 receptions, 60 yards
