= 2024 Idaho Vandals football team =

American college football season

2024 Idaho Vandals football

FCS Quarterfinal, L 19–52 at Montana State
- Conference: Big Sky

Ranking
- STATS: No. 7
- FCS Coaches: No. 8
- Record: 10–4 (6–2 Big Sky)
- Head coach: Jason Eck (3rd season)
- Offensive coordinator: Luke Schleusner (3rd season)
- Offensive scheme: Multiple
- Defensive coordinator: Dan Jackson (1st season)
- Base defense: 4–2–5
- Home stadium: Kibbie Dome

2024 Big Sky Conference football standings
| | Conf. | | | Overall |
| Team | W | | L | W | | L |
|---|---|---|---|---|---|---|
| No. 2 Montana State $^ | 8 | – | 0 | 15 | – | 1 |
| No. 5 UC Davis ^ | 7 | – | 1 | 11 | – | 3 |
| No. 7 Idaho ^ | 6 | – | 2 | 10 | – | 4 |
| No. 22 Northern Arizona ^ | 6 | – | 2 | 8 | – | 5 |
| No. 10 Montana ^ | 5 | – | 3 | 9 | – | 5 |
| Idaho State | 3 | – | 5 | 5 | – | 7 |
| Eastern Washington | 3 | – | 5 | 4 | – | 8 |
| Weber State | 3 | – | 5 | 4 | – | 8 |
| Portland State | 3 | – | 5 | 3 | – | 8 |
| Cal Poly | 2 | – | 6 | 3 | – | 8 |
| Sacramento State | 1 | – | 7 | 3 | – | 9 |
| Northern Colorado | 1 | – | 7 | 1 | – | 11 |
$ – Conference champion; ^ – FCS playoff participant; Rankings from STATS Poll

The 2024 Idaho Vandals football team represented the University of Idaho in the Big Sky Conference during the 2024 NCAA Division I FCS football season. Led by third-year head coach Jason Eck, the Vandals played their home games on campus at the Kibbie Dome in Moscow, Idaho. Idaho finished 9–3 in the regular season (6–2 in Big Sky, third) and were seeded eighth in the 24-team FCS playoffs, which included a bye in the first round.

The day after the Vandals' FCS quarterfinal loss at top-ranked Montana State, Eck departed for New Mexico of the Mountain West Conference; Idaho finished the season at 10–4.

== Schedule ==
| Date | Time | Opponent | Rank | Site | TV | Result | Attendance |
|---|---|---|---|---|---|---|---|
| August 31 | 4:30 p.m. | at No. 3 (FBS) Oregon* | No. 7 | Autzen Stadium; Eugene, OR | BTN | L 14–24 | 57,435 |
| September 7 | 12:30 p.m. | at Wyoming* | No. 7 | War Memorial Stadium; Laramie, WY | TruTV | W 17–13 | 25,070 |
| September 14 | 1:00 p.m. | No. 17 Albany* | No. 4 | Kibbie Dome; Moscow, ID | ESPN+ | W 41–13 | 11,432 |
| September 21 | 5:00 p.m. | at No. 19 Abilene Christian* | No. 4 | Anthony Field at Wildcat Stadium; Abilene, TX | ESPN+ | W 27–24 | 11,719 |
| September 28 | 7:00 p.m. | at No. 14 UC Davis | No. 4 | UC Davis Health Stadium; Davis, CA | ESPN+ | L 26–28 | 8,921 |
| October 5 | 2:00 p.m. | No. 25 Northern Arizona^{†} | No. 10 | Kibbie Dome; Moscow, ID | ESPN+ | W 23–17 | 14,066 |
| October 12 | 7:15 p.m. | at No. 3 Montana State | No. 7 | Bobcat Stadium; Bozeman, MT | ESPN2 | L 7–38 | 21,907 |
| October 19 | 1:00 p.m. | Cal Poly | No. 13 | Kibbie Dome; Moscow, ID | ESPN+ | W 34–29 | 8,873 |
| October 26 | 6:00 p.m. | Eastern Washington | No. 11 | Kibbie Dome; Moscow, ID | ESPN+ | W 38–28 | 13,277 |
| November 9 | 1:00 p.m. | at Portland State | No. 9 | Hillsboro Stadium; Portland, OR | ESPN+ | W 39–30 | 2,581 |
| November 16 | 5:00 p.m. | Weber State | No. 8 | Kibbie Dome; Moscow, ID | ESPN+ | W 31–24 | 9,851 |
| November 23 | 3:00 p.m. | at Idaho State | No. 7 | ICCU Dome; Pocatello, ID (rivalry) | ESPN+ | W 40–17 | 10,032 |
| December 7 | 6:00 p.m. | Lehigh* | No. 7 | Kibbie Dome; Moscow, ID (FCS Second Round) | ESPN+ | W 34–13 | 7,346 |
| December 13 | 6:00 p.m. | at No. 1 Montana State* | No. 7 | Bobcat Stadium; Bozeman, MT (FCS Quarterfinal) | ESPN | L 19–52 | 18,127 |
*Non-conference game; ^{†}Homecoming; Rankings from STATS Poll released prior to the game; All times are in Pacific time; Source:

== Ranking movements ==
Ranking movements Legend: ██ Increase in ranking ██ Decrease in ranking ( ) = First-place votes
| | Week | | | | | | | | | | | | | | |
| Poll | Pre | 1 | 2 | 3 | 4 | 5 | 6 | 7 | 8 | 9 | 10 | 11 | 12 | 13 | Final |
|---|---|---|---|---|---|---|---|---|---|---|---|---|---|---|---|
| STATS FCS | 7 | 7 | 4 | 4 (3) | 4 (5) | 10 | 7 | 13 | 11 | 10 | 9 | 8 | 7 | 7 | 7 |
| Coaches | 7 | 7 | 5 | 4 | 4 (1) | 12 | 8 | 14 | 12 | 11 | 12 | 10 | 8 | 8 | 8 |

== Game summaries ==
=== at No. 3 (FBS) Oregon ===
No. 7 Idaho Vandals at No. 3 (FBS) Oregon Ducks – Game summary

| Quarter | 1 | 2 | 3 | 4 | Total |
|---|---|---|---|---|---|
| No. 7 Vandals | 0 | 0 | 7 | 7 | 14 |
| No. 3 (FBS) Ducks | 7 | 7 | 0 | 10 | 24 |

at Autzen Stadium, Eugene, Oregon

- Date: August 31
- Game time: 4:30 p.m. PDT
- Game weather: Sunny • Temperature: 92 °F (33 °C) • Wind: NW 5 mph
- Game attendance: 57,435
- Referee: Jim Wharrie
- TV announcers (BTN): Guy Haberman (play-by-play), Yogi Roth (analyst), and Rhett Lewis (sideline reporter)
- Box score, Recap

Game information

First quarter

- ORE – Tez Johnson 7-yard pass from Dillon Gabriel (Atticus Sappington kick), 8:19. Ducks 7–0. Drive: 11 plays, 71 yards, 5:16.

Second quarter

- ORE – Jordan James 6-yard run (Atticus Sappington kick), 7:00. Ducks 14–0. Drive: 8 plays, 80 yards, 3:24.

Third quarter

- IDHO – Jake Cox 36-yard pass from Jack Layne (Cameron Pope kick), 4:15. Ducks 14–7. Drive: 1 play, 36 yards, 0:07.

Fourth quarter

- ORE – Atticus Sappington 26-yard field goal, 12:43. Ducks 17–7. Drive: 14 plays, 67 yards, 6:32.
- IDHO – Jack Layne 4-yard run (Cameron Pope kick), 9:45. Ducks 17–14. Drive: 6 plays, 75 yards, 2:58.
- ORE – Tez Johnson 12-yard pass from Dillon Gabriel (Atticus Sappington Kick), 5:36. Ducks 24–14. Drive: 10 plays, 75 yards, 4:09.

| Statistics | IDHO | ORE |
|---|---|---|
| First downs | 10 | 31 |
| Total yards | 217 | 487 |
| Rushing yards | 49 | 107 |
| Passing yards | 168 | 380 |
| Passing: Comp–Att–Int | 11-27-2 | 41-50-0 |
| Time of possession | 20:45 | 39:15 |

| Team | Category | Player | Statistics |
|---|---|---|---|
| Idaho | Passing | Jack Layne | 11/25, 168 yards, 2 INT |
| Idaho | Rushing | Elisha Cummings | 8 rushes, 47 yards |
| Idaho | Receiving | Mark Hamper | 3 receptions, 57 yards |
| Oregon | Passing | Dillon Gabriel | 41/49, 380 yards, 2 TD |
| Oregon | Rushing | Jordan James | 15 rushes, 95 yards, TD |
| Oregon | Receiving | Terrance Ferguson | 7 receptions, 87 yards |

=== at Wyoming (FBS) ===
No. 7 Idaho Vandals at Wyoming Cowboys (FBS) – Game summary

| Quarter | 1 | 2 | 3 | 4 | Total |
|---|---|---|---|---|---|
| No. 7 Vandals | 7 | 10 | 0 | 0 | 17 |
| Cowboys (FBS) | 10 | 0 | 0 | 3 | 13 |

at War Memorial Stadium, Laramie, Wyoming

- Date: September 7
- Game time: 12:30 p.m. PDT/1:30 p.m. MDT
- Game weather: Sunny • Temperature: 75 °F (24 °C) • Wind: N 7 MPH
- Game attendance: 25,070
- Referee: Scott Hardin
- TV announcers (TruTV): Ari Wolfe (play-by-play), Darius Walker (analyst), and Jared Greenberg (sideline)
- Box score, Recap

Game information

First quarter

- WYO – John Hoyland 48-yard field goal, 12:50. Cowboys 3–0. Drive: 6 plays, 44 yards, 2:10.
- IDHO – Elisha Cummings 3-yard run (Cameron Pope kick), 6:36. Vandals 7–3. Drive: 7 plays, 37 yards, 3:57.
- WYO – Devin Boddie 20-yard pass from Evan Svoboda (John Hoyland kick), 2:06. Cowboys 10–7. Drive: 9 plays, 72 yards, 4:23.

Second quarter

- IDHO – Jake Cox 2-yard pass from Jack Wagner (Cameron Pope kick), 11:33. Vandals 14–10. Drive: 10 plays, 75 yards, 5:33.
- IDHO – Cameron Pope 49-yard field goal, 4:40. Vandals 17–10. Drive: 7 plays, 32 yards, 3:43.

Third quarter

- No scoring plays

Fourth quarter

- WYO – John Hoyland 22-yard field goal, 14:57. Vandals 17–13. Drive: 8 plays, 45 yards, 3:29.

| Statistics | IDHO | WYO |
|---|---|---|
| First downs | 14 | 16 |
| Total yards | 225 | 270 |
| Rushing yards | 124 | 144 |
| Passing yards | 101 | 126 |
| Passing: Comp–Att–Int | 12–21–0 | 10–26–0 |
| Time of possession | 31:20 | 28:40 |

| Team | Category | Player | Statistics |
|---|---|---|---|
| Idaho | Passing | Jack Wagner | 12/21, 101 yards, TD |
| Idaho | Rushing | Nate Thomas | 15 rushes, 64 yards |
| Idaho | Receiving | Jordan Dwyer | 6 receptions, 66 yards |
| Wyoming | Passing | Evan Svoboda | 10/24, 126 yards, TD |
| Wyoming | Rushing | DJ Jones | 17 rushes, 80 yards |
| Wyoming | Receiving | Will Pelissier | 1 reception, 38 yards |

=== No. 17 Albany ===
No. 17 Albany Great Danes at No. 4 Idaho Vandals – Game summary

| Quarter | 1 | 2 | 3 | 4 | Total |
|---|---|---|---|---|---|
| No. 17 Great Danes | 3 | 0 | 3 | 7 | 13 |
| No. 4 Vandals | 13 | 14 | 14 | 0 | 41 |

at Kibbie Dome, Moscow, Idaho

- Date: September 14
- Game time: 4:00 p.m. PDT
- Game weather: None (played indoors)
- Game attendance: 11,432
- Referee: Jeff Rink
- TV announcers (ESPN+/SWX NW): Bob Castle, Brian Standley
- Box score, Recap

Game information
First quarter
- IDHO – Jordan Dwyer 12-yard pass from Jack Wagner (run failed), 8:39. Vandals 6–0. Drive: 3 plays, 80 yards, 1:39.
- ALB – John Opalko 25-yard field goal, 3:51. Vandals 6–3. Drive: 9 plays, 67 yards, 4:48.
- IDHO – Nate Thomas 2-yard run (Cameron Pope kick), 0:51. Vandals 13–3. Drive: 9 plays, 79 yards, 2:54.

Second quarter

- IDHO – Jordan Dwyer 4-yard pass from Jack Wagner (Cameron Pope kick), 12:29. Vandals 20–3. Drive: 7 plays, 54 yards, 2:12.
- IDHO – Andrew Marshall 47-yard punt return (Cameron Pope kick), 7:11. Vandals 27–3.

Third quarter

- IDHO – Nate Thomas 1-yard run (Cameron Pope kick), 7:02. Vandals 34–3. Drive: 5 plays, 61 yards, 2:35.
- IDHO – Tommy McCormick 32-yard interception return (Cameron Pope kick), 6:53. Vandals 41–3.
- ALB – John Opalko 33-yard field goal, 4:38. Vandals 41–6. Drive: 5 plays, 59 yards, 2:15.

Fourth quarter

- ALB – Levi Wentz 19-yard pass from Myles Burkett (John Opalko kick), 1:52. Vandals 41–13. Drive: 7 plays, 73 yards, 3:08.

| Statistics | ALB | IDHO |
|---|---|---|
| First downs | 21 | 20 |
| Total yards | 350 | 420 |
| Rushing yards | 60 | 247 |
| Passing yards | 290 | 173 |
| Passing: Comp–Att–Int | 23–38–1 | 11–23–0 |
| Time of possession | 35:30 | 24:30 |

| Team | Category | Player | Statistics |
|---|---|---|---|
| Albany | Passing | Myles Burkett | 23/38, 290 yards, TD, INT |
| Albany | Rushing | Griffin Woodell | 14 rushes, 23 yards |
| Albany | Receiving | Levi Wentz | 5 receptions, 114 yards, TD |
| Idaho | Passing | Jack Wagner | 10/20, 156 yards, 2 TD |
| Idaho | Rushing | Nate Thomas | 8 rushes, 75 yards, 2 TD |
| Idaho | Receiving | Mark Hamper | 3 receptions, 74 yards |

=== at No. 19 Abilene Christian ===
No. 4 Idaho Vandals at No. 19 Abilene Christian Wildcats – Game summary

| Quarter | 1 | 2 | 3 | 4 | Total |
|---|---|---|---|---|---|
| No. 4 Vandals | 14 | 6 | 7 | 0 | 27 |
| No. 19 Wildcats | 0 | 3 | 8 | 13 | 24 |

at Wildcat Stadium, Abilene, Texas

- Date: September 21
- Game time: 5:00 p.m. PDT/7:00 p.m. CDT
- Game weather: Sunny
- Game attendance: 11,719
- TV announcers (ESPN+): Andy Penney (play-by-play) and Ryan Holmes (analyst)
- Box score, Recap

Game information

First quarter

- IDHO – Jordan Dwyer 22-yard pass from Jack Wagner (Cameron Pope kick), 7:06. Vandals 7–0. Drive: 4 plays, 58 yards, 2:28.
- IDHO – Mark Hamper 44-yard pass from Jack Wagner (Cameron Pope kick), 3:00. Vandals 14–0. Drive: 7 plays, 73 yards, 2:47.

Second quarter

- ACU – Ritse Vaes 27-yard field goal, 13:01. Vandals 14–3. Drive: 12 plays, 65 yards, 4:59.
- IDHO – Cameron Pope 33-yard field goal, 4:41. Vandals 17–3. Drive: 5 plays, 44 yards, 2:17.
- IDHO – Cameron Pope 25-yard field goal, 0:15. Vandals 20–3. Drive: 13 plays, 63 yards, 2:54.

Third quarter

- IDHO – Nate Thomas 3-yard run (Cameron Pope kick), 13:04. Vandals 27–3. Drive: 4 plays, 75 yards, 1:56.
- ACU – J. J. Henry 5-yard pass from Maverick McIvor (Maverick McIvor pass to Blayne Taylor), 2:32. Vandals 27–11. Drive: 11 plays, 61 yards, 4:50.

Fourth quarter

- ACU – Nehemiah Martinez I 23-yard pass from Maverick McIvor (pass failed), 10:03. Vandals 27–17. Drive: 6 plays, 80 yards, 2:29.
- ACU – Isaiah Johnson 1-yard run (Ritse Vaes kick), 3:47. Vandals 27–24. Drive: 9 plays, 72 yards, 4:14.

| Statistics | IDHO | ACU |
|---|---|---|
| First downs | 23 | 25 |
| Total yards | 424 | 393 |
| Rushing yards | 171 | 105 |
| Passing yards | 253 | 288 |
| Turnovers | 0 | 3 |
| Time of possession | 30:57 | 29:03 |

| Team | Category | Player | Statistics |
|---|---|---|---|
| Idaho | Passing | Jack Wagner | 18/35, 253 yards, 2 TD |
| Idaho | Rushing | Nate Thomas | 15 carries, 64 yards, TD |
| Idaho | Receiving | Jordan Dwyer | 5 receptions, 91 yards, TD |
| Abilene Christian | Passing | Maverick McIvor | 26/46, 288 yards, 2 TD, 2 INT |
| Abilene Christian | Rushing | Isaiah Jonhson | 10 carries, 59 yards, TD |
| Abilene Christian | Receiving | Nehemiah Martinez I | 4 receptions, 77 yards, TD |

=== at No. 14 UC Davis ===
No. 4 Idaho Vandals at No. 14 UC Davis Aggies – Game summary

| Quarter | 1 | 2 | 3 | 4 | Total |
|---|---|---|---|---|---|
| No. 4 Vandals | 14 | 3 | 0 | 9 | 26 |
| No. 13 Aggies | 7 | 7 | 14 | 0 | 28 |

at UC Davis Health Stadium • Davis, CA

- Date: September 28, 2024
- Game time: 7:00 p.m. PDT
- Game weather: Sunny • Temperature: 82 °F (28 °C)
- Game attendance: 8,921
- Referee: Kelly Holman
- TV announcers (ESPN+/KQCA): Scott Marsh, Scott Gordon

Game information

First quarter

- IDHO – Emmerson Cortez-Menjivar 9-yard pass from Jack Wagner (Cameron Pope kick), 11:27. Vandals 7–0. Drive: 7 plays, 78 yards, 3:29.
- IDHO – Nate Thomas 1-yard run (Cameron Pope kick), 4:00. Vandals 14–0. Drive: 11 plays, 56 yards, 5:43.
- UCD – Chaz Davis 10-yard pass from Miles Hastings (Hunter Ridley kick), 0:43. Vandals 14–7. Drive: 10 plays, 59 yards, 3:16.

Second quarter

- UCD – Lan Larison 1-yard run (Hunter Ridley kick), 8:35. Tied 14–14. Drive: 10 plays, 66 yards, 3:30.
- IDHO – Cameron Pope 43-yard field goal, 5:17. Vandals 17–14. Drive: 7 plays, 47 yards, 3:11.

Third quarter

- UCD – Lan Larison 26-yard pass from Miles Hastings (Hunter Ridley kick), 14:18. Aggies 21–17. Drive: 2 plays, 28 yards, 0:29.
- UCD – Winston Williams 13-yard pass from Miles Hastings (Hunter Ridley kick), 1:45. Aggies 28–17. Drive: 6 plays, 54 yards, 1:48.

Fourth quarter

- IDHO – Cameron Pope 22-yard field goal, 4:28. Aggies 28–20. Drive: 13 plays, 74 yards, 3:49.
- IDHO – Emmerson Cortez-Menjivar 19-yard pass from Nick Josifek (2-point pass conversion failed), 0:44. Aggies 28–26. Drive: 11 plays, 88 yards, 1:38.

| Statistics | IDHO | UCD |
|---|---|---|
| First downs | 28 | 20 |
| Total yards | 459 | 312 |
| Rushing yards | 185 | 26 |
| Passing yards | 274 | 286 |
| Turnovers | 3 | 1 |
| Time of possession | 32:19 | 27:41 |

| Team | Category | Player | Statistics |
|---|---|---|---|
| Idaho | Passing | Jack Wagner | 13/25, 178 yards, TD, 2 INT |
| Idaho | Rushing | Elisha Cummings | 11 carries, 72 yards |
| Idaho | Receiving | Jordan Dwyer | 8 receptions, 114 yards |
| UC Davis | Passing | Miles Hastings | 25/32, 248 yards, 3 TD |
| UC Davis | Rushing | Lan Larison | 18 carries, 46 yards, TD |
| UC Davis | Receiving | Lan Larison | 4 receptions, 54 yards, TD |

=== No. 25 Northern Arizona ===
No. 25 Northern Arizona Lumberjacks at No. 10 Idaho Vandals – Game summary

| Quarter | 1 | 2 | 3 | 4 | Total |
|---|---|---|---|---|---|
| No. 25 Lumberjacks | 7 | 3 | 0 | 7 | 17 |
| No. 10 Vandals | 6 | 14 | 3 | 0 | 23 |

at Kibbie Dome • Moscow, ID

- Date: October 5, 2024
- Game time: 2:00 p.m. PDT
- Game weather: Sunny
- Game attendance: 14,066
- Referee: Robert Quello
- TV announcers (ESPN+/SWX NW): Bob Castle, Brian Strandley

Game information

First quarter

- IDHO – Mike Martinez 9-yard pass from Jack Wagner (PAT failed), 4:27. Vandals 6–0. Drive: 7 plays, 69 yards, 4:32.
- NAU – Bryzai White 50-yard pass from Ty Pennington (Marcus Lye kick), 1:45. Lumberjacks 7–6. Drive: 6 plays, 75 yards, 2:42.

Second quarter

- IDHO – Nate Thomas 13-yard run (Cameron Pope kick), 11:20. Vandals 13–7. Drive: 8 plays, 75 yards, 5:25.
- NAU – Marcus Lye 50-yard field goal, 4:43. Vandals 13–10. Drive: 12 plays, 43 yards, 6:37.
- IDHO – Jordan Dwyer 23-yard pass from Nick Josifek (Cameron Pope kick), 2:01. Vandals 20–10. Drive: 6 plays, 75 yards, 2:42.

Third quarter

- IDHO – Cameron Pope 40-yard field goal, 10:24. Vandals 23–10. Drive: 9 plays, 52 yards, 4:36.

Fourth quarter

- NAU – PJ London 2-yard run (Marcus Lye kick), 4:11. Vandals 23–17. Drive: 9 plays, 63 yards, 4:43.

| Statistics | NAU | IDHO |
|---|---|---|
| First downs | 16 | 15 |
| Total yards | 314 | 313 |
| Rushing yards | 118 | 189 |
| Passing yards | 196 | 124 |
| Turnovers | 2 | 1 |
| Time of possession | 28:45 | 31:15 |

| Team | Category | Player | Statistics |
|---|---|---|---|
| Northern Arizona | Passing | Ty Pennington | 12/17, 114 yards, TD |
| Northern Arizona | Rushing | J'Wan Evans | 6 carries, 35 yards |
| Northern Arizona | Receiving | Bryzai White | 4 receptions, 72 yards, TD |
| Idaho | Passing | Nick Josifek | 6/7, 109 yards, TD |
| Idaho | Rushing | Elisha Cummings | 17 carries, 119 yards |
| Idaho | Receiving | Mark Hamper | 3 receptions, 48 yards |

=== at No. 3 Montana State ===
No. 7 Idaho Vandals at No. 3 Montana State Bobcats – Game summary

| Quarter | 1 | 2 | 3 | 4 | Total |
|---|---|---|---|---|---|
| No. 7 Vandals | 0 | 0 | 0 | 7 | 7 |
| No. 3 Bobcats | 14 | 10 | 7 | 7 | 38 |

at Bobcat Stadium, Bozeman, Montana

- Date: October 12
- Game time: 7:15 p.m. PDT/8:15 p.m. MDT
- TV announcers (ESPN2): Jay Alter (play-by-play) and Rocky Boiman (analyst)

Game information

First quarter

- (5:34) MTST - Tommy Mellott 65-yard run (Myles Sansted kick) (Montana State 7-0)
- (0:11) MTST - Taco Dowler 34-yard pass from Tommy Mellott (Myles Sansted kick) (Montana State 14-0)

Second quarter

- (1:44) MTST - Tommy Mellott 7-yard run (Myles Sansted kick) (Montana State 21-0)
- (0:00) MTST - Myles Sansted 34-yard field goal (Montana State 24-0)

Third quarter

- (12:48) MTST - Rohan Jones 11-yard pass from Tommy Mellott (Myles Sansted kick) (Montana State 31-0)

Fourth quarter

- (12:44) MTST - Adam Jones 4-yard run (Myles Sansted kick) (Montana State 38-0)
- (0:43) IDHO - Deshaun Buchanan 9-yard pass from Jack Wagner (Cameron Pope kick) (Montana State 38-7)

| Statistics | IDHO | MTST |
|---|---|---|
| First downs | 13 | 27 |
| Total yards | 267 | 485 |
| Rushing yards | 91 | 360 |
| Passing yards | 176 | 125 |
| Passing: Comp–Att–Int | 16-31-1 | 12–17–0 |
| Time of possession | 22:17 | 37:43 |

| Team | Category | Player | Statistics |
|---|---|---|---|
| Idaho | Passing | Jack Wagner | 11/23, 134 yards, TD, INT |
| Idaho | Rushing | Deshaun Buchanan | 9 carries, 49 yards |
| Idaho | Receiving | Tony Harste | 3 receptions, 48 yards |
| Montana State | Passing | Tommy Mellott | 11/15, 121 yards, 2 TD |
| Montana State | Rushing | Tommy Mellott | 11 carries, 140 yards, 2 TD |
| Montana State | Receiving | Rohan Jones | 3 receptions, 28 yards, TD |

=== Cal Poly ===
Cal Poly Mustangs at No. 13 Idaho Vandals – Game summary

| Quarter | 1 | 2 | 3 | 4 | Total |
|---|---|---|---|---|---|
| Mustangs | 0 | 14 | 2 | 13 | 29 |
| No. 13 Vandals | 3 | 3 | 21 | 7 | 34 |

at Kibbie Dome • Moscow, ID

- Date: October 19, 2024
- Game time: 1:00 p.m. PDT
- TV announcers (ESPN+/SWX NW): Bob Castle, Brian Strandley

Game information

First quarter

- IDHO – Cameron Pope 44-yard field goal, 1:38. Vandals 3–0. Drive: 11 plays, 42 yards, 5:34.

Second quarter

- CP – Giancarlo Woods 17-yard pass from Bo Kelly (Noah Serna kick), 9:49. Mustangs 7–3. Drive: 13 plays, 75 yards, 6:49.
- CP – Alek Marshall 3-yard pass from Richie Watts (Noah Serna kick), 5:30. Mustangs 14–3. Drive: 6 plays, 63 yards, 2:38.
- IDHO – Cameron Pope 25-yard field goal, 2:02. Mustangs 14–6. Drive: 7 plays, 67 yards, 3:28.

Third quarter

- IDHO – Mike Martinez 8-yard pass from Jack Wagner (Rocco Koch run for 2-point conversion), 12:08. Tied 14–14. Drive: 7 plays, 93 yards, 2:43.
- IDHO – Rocco Koch 2-yard run (PAT blocked), 7:05. Vandals 20–14. Drive: 5 plays, 65 yards, 2:42.
- CP – Brian Dukes Jr. defensive PAT conversion, 7:05. Vandals 20–16. Drive: 5 plays, 65 yards, 2:42.
- IDHO – Emmerson Cortez-Menjivar 21-yard pass from Jack Wagner (Cameron Pope kick), 3:13. Vandals 27–16. Drive: 3 plays, 76 yards, 1:15.

Fourth quarter

- IDHO – Jordan Dwyer 21-yard pass from Jack Wagner (Cameron Pope kick), 6:11. Vandals 34–16. Drive: 6 plays, 46 yards, 3:38.
- CP – Giancarlo Woods 4-yard pass from Bo Kelly (Noah Serna kick), 2:39. Vandals 34–23. Drive: 12 plays, 81 yards, 3:27.
- CP – Kai Rapolla 71-yard fumble return (2-point run conversion failed), 1:02. Vandals 34–29. Drive: 6 plays, 40 yards, 1:35.

| Statistics | CP | IDHO |
|---|---|---|
| First downs | 21 | 19 |
| Total yards | 357 | 453 |
| Rushing yards | 77 | 106 |
| Passing yards | 280 | 347 |
| Turnovers | 1 | 2 |
| Time of possession | 29:45 | 30:15 |

| Team | Category | Player | Statistics |
|---|---|---|---|
| Cal Poly | Passing | Bo Kelly | 29/41, 268 yards, 2 TD, INT |
| Cal Poly | Rushing | Michael Briscoe | 1 carry, 50 yards |
| Cal Poly | Receiving | Giancarlo Woods | 8 receptions, 102 yards, 2 TD |
| Idaho | Passing | Jack Wagner | 17/23, 347 yards, 3 TD, INT |
| Idaho | Rushing | Art Williams | 15 carries, 86 yards |
| Idaho | Receiving | Mark Hamper | 4 receptions, 103 yards |

=== Eastern Washington ===
Eastern Washington Eagles at No. 11 Idaho Vandals – Game summary

| Quarter | 1 | 2 | 3 | 4 | Total |
|---|---|---|---|---|---|
| Eagles | 7 | 6 | 0 | 15 | 28 |
| No. 11 Vandals | 7 | 10 | 7 | 14 | 38 |

at Kibbie Dome • Moscow, ID

- Date: October 26, 2024
- Game time: 6:00 p.m. PDT
- Game weather: None (played indoors)
- TV announcers (ESPN+/SWX NW): Austin Getz, Ty Graham

Game information

First quarter

- IDHO – Alex Moore 4-yard pass from Jack Layne (Cameron Pope kick), 9:32. Vandals 7–0.
- EWU – Kekoa Visperas 1-yard run (Soren McKee kick), 5:35. Tied 7–7.

Second quarter

- IDHO – Jordan Dwyer 15-yard pass from Jack Layne (Cameron Pope kick), 14:51. Vandals 14–7.
- EWU – Soren McKee 24-yard field goal, 12:15. Vandals 14–10.
- IDHO – Cameron Pope 34-yard field goal, 4:25. Vandals 17–10.
- EWU – Soren McKee 44-yard field goal, 1:24. Vandals 17–13.

Third quarter

- IDHO – Deshaun Buchanan 1-yard run (Cameron Pope kick), 4:11. Vandals 24–13.

Fourth quarter

- IDHO – Rocco Koch 3-yard run (Cameron Pope kick), 14:25. Vandals 31–13.
- EWU – JP Murphy 3-yard pass from Jared Taylor (Jared Taylor pass to Efton Chism III for 2-point conversion), 8:18. Vandals 31–21.
- IDHO – Deshaun Buchanan 12-yard run (Cameron Pope kick), 5:06. Vandals 38–21.
- EWU – Michael Wortham 100-yard kickoff return (Soren McKee kick), 4:54. Vandals 38–28.

| Statistics | EWU | IDHO |
|---|---|---|
| First downs | 20 | 24 |
| Total yards | 388 | 487 |
| Rushing yards | 215 | 252 |
| Passing yards | 173 | 235 |
| Turnovers | 1 | 1 |
| Time of possession | 26:42 | 33:18 |

| Team | Category | Player | Statistics |
|---|---|---|---|
| Eastern Washington | Passing | Kekoa Visperas | 11/14, 156 yards |
| Eastern Washington | Rushing | Tuna Altahir | 13 carries, 67 yards |
| Eastern Washington | Receiving | Efton Chism III | 7 receptions, 114 yards |
| Idaho | Passing | Jack Layne | 17/28, 235 yards, 2 TD, INT |
| Idaho | Rushing | Deshaun Buchanan | 8 carries, 116 yards, 2 TD |
| Idaho | Receiving | Jordan Dwyer | 4 receptions, 78 yards, TD |

=== at Portland State ===
No. 9 Idaho Vandals at Portland State Vikings – Game summary

| Quarter | 1 | 2 | 3 | 4 | Total |
|---|---|---|---|---|---|
| No. 9 Vandals | 14 | 14 | 3 | 8 | 39 |
| Vikings | 7 | 14 | 3 | 6 | 30 |

at Hillsboro Stadium, Portland, Oregon

- Date: November 9
- Game time: 1:00 p.m. PDT
- TV announcers (ESPN+): Matt Richert, Scott Hermo

Game information

First quarter

- IDHO – Art Williams 7-yard run (Cameron Pope kick), 10:49. Vandals 7–0. Drive: 4 plays, 24 yards, 1:21.
- PRST – Deion Thompson 1-yard run (Mathias Uribe kick), 4:11. Tied 7–7. Drive: 11 plays, 70 yards, 6:32.
- IDHO – Jordan Dwyer 27-yard pass from Jack Wagner (Cameron Pope kick), 1:14. Vandals 14–7. Drive: 6 plays, 75 yards, 2:57.

Second quarter

- PRST – Quincy Craig 20-yard pass from Dante Chachere (Mathias Uribe kick), 8:38. Tied 14–14. Drive: 13 plays, 79 yards, 7:35.
- PRST – Branden Alvarez 26-yard pass from Dante Chachere (Mathias Uribe kick), 5:40. Vikings 21–14. Drive: 3 plays, 44 yards, 1:12.
- IDHO – Deshaun Buchanan 22-yard run (Cameron Pope kick), 2:52. Tied 21–21. Drive: 5 plays, 75 yards, 2:48.
- IDHO – Deshaun Buchanan 13-yard run (Cameron Pope kick), 0:42. Vandals 28–21. Drive: 8 plays, 69 yards, 1:00.

Third quarter

- PRST – Mathias Uribe 44-yard field goal, 10:05. Vandals 28–24. Drive: 10 plays, 48 yards, 4:55.
- IDHO – Cameron Pope 25-yard field goal, 5:53. Vandals 31–24. Drive: 7 plays, 60 yards, 4:06.

Fourth quarter

- PRST – Mathias Uribe 27-yard field goal, 14:11. Vandals 31–27. Drive: 13 plays, 64 yards, 6:41.
- PRST – Mathias Uribe 48-yard field goal, 5:11. Vandals 31–30. Drive: 4 plays, -5 yards, 1:25.
- IDHO – Art Williams 3-yard run (Art Williams run for 2-point conversion), 1:56. Vandals 39–30. Drive: 8 plays, 75 yards, 3:15.

| Statistics | IDHO | PRST |
|---|---|---|
| First downs | 20 | 20 |
| Total yards | 462 | 314 |
| Rushing yards | 257 | 134 |
| Passing yards | 205 | 180 |
| Passing: Comp–Att–Int | 11-17-0 | 15–21–0 |
| Time of possession | 26:39 | 33:21 |

| Team | Category | Player | Statistics |
|---|---|---|---|
| Idaho | Passing | Jack Wagner | 11/17, 205 yards, TD |
| Idaho | Rushing | Deshaun Buchanan | 22 carries, 212 yards, 2 TD |
| Idaho | Receiving | Jordan Dwyer | 5 receptions, 109 yards, TD |
| Portland State | Passing | Dante Chachere | 15/21, 180 yards, 2 TD |
| Portland State | Rushing | Deion Thompson | 15 carries, 71 yards, TD |
| Portland State | Receiving | Branden Alvarez | 5 receptions, 63 yards, TD |

=== Weber State ===
Weber State Wildcats at No. 8 Idaho Vandals – Game summary

| Quarter | 1 | 2 | 3 | 4 | Total |
|---|---|---|---|---|---|
| Wildcats | 0 | 14 | 0 | 10 | 24 |
| No. 8 Vandals | 7 | 3 | 6 | 15 | 31 |

at Kibbie Dome • Moscow, ID

- Date: November 16, 2024
- Game time: 5:00 p.m. PDT
- TV announcers (ESPN+/SWX NW): Austin Getz, Brian Strandley

Game information

First quarter

- IDHO – Mark Hamper 36-yard pass from Jack Layne (Cameron Pope kick), 6:39. Vandals 7–0. Drive: 3 plays, 62 yards, 1:25.

Second quarter

- WEB – Keayan Nead 1-yard pass from Richie Munoz (Kyle Thompson kick), 12:12. Tied 7–7. Drive: 10 plays, 40 yards, 5:07.
- IDHO – Cameron Pope 50-yard field goal, 2:41. Vandals 10–7. Drive: 6 plays, 55 yards, 2:50.
- WEB – Richie Munoz 1-yard run (Kyle Thompson kick), 0:20. Wildcats 14–10. Drive: 11 plays, 53 yards, 2:11.

Third quarter

- IDHO – Cameron Pope 48-yard field goal, 10:14. Wilcats 14–13. Drive: 9 plays, 58 yards, 3:11.
- IDHO – Cameron Pope 36-yard field goal, 2:22. Vandals 16–14. Drive: 13 plays, 57 yards, 6:09.

Fourth quarter

- IDHO – Mark Hamper 16-yard pass from Jack Layne (Cameron Pope kick), 8:28. Vandals 23–14. Drive: 10 plays, 62 yards, 5:37.
- WEB – Kyle Thompson 31-yard field goal, 3:34. Vandals 26–14. Drive: 12 plays, 65 yards, 4:45.
- IDHO – Mark Hamper 74-yard pass from Jack Layne (Dylan Lane pass to Emmerson Cortez-Menjivar for 2-point conversion), 1:56. Vandals 31–17. Drive: 3 plays, 80 yards, 1:49.
- WEB – Jacob Sharp 57-yard pass from Richie Munoz (Kyle Thompson kick), 0:43. Vandals 31–24. Drive: 5 plays, 79 yards, 0:57.

| Statistics | WEB | IDHO |
|---|---|---|
| First downs | 12 | 20 |
| Total yards | 296 | 419 |
| Rushing yards | 78 | 136 |
| Passing yards | 218 | 283 |
| Turnovers | 0 | 1 |
| Time of possession | 27:06 | 32:54 |

| Team | Category | Player | Statistics |
|---|---|---|---|
| Weber State | Passing | Richie Munoz | 20/32, 207 yards, 2 TD |
| Weber State | Rushing | Damon Bankston | 11 carries, 54 yards |
| Weber State | Receiving | Jacob Sharp | 3 receptions, 67 yards, TD |
| Idaho | Passing | Jack Layne | 18/27, 283 yards, 3 TD, INT |
| Idaho | Rushing | Art Williams | 10 carries, 67 yards |
| Idaho | Receiving | Mark Hamper | 8 receptions, 187 yards, 3 TD |

=== at Idaho State (rivalry) ===
No. 7 Idaho Vandals at Idaho State Bengals – Game summary

| Quarter | 1 | 2 | 3 | 4 | Total |
|---|---|---|---|---|---|
| No. 7 Vandals | 10 | 7 | 13 | 10 | 40 |
| Bengals | 0 | 7 | 3 | 7 | 17 |

at ICCU Dome, Pocatello, Idaho

- Date: November 23
- Game time: 3:00 p.m. PDT
- Game weather: None (indoor stadium)
- Game attendance: 10,032
- Referee: Joh Doe
- TV announcers (ESPN+/SWX NW): Scott Gross (play-by-play) and Kody Graves (analyst)

Game information

First quarter

- IDHO – Emmerson Cortez-Menjivar 41-yard pass from Jack Layne (Cameron Pope kick), 9:19. Vandals 7–0. Drive: 6 plays, 86 yards, 3:19.
- IDHO – Cameron Pope 35-yard field goal, 2:35. Vandals 10–0. Drive: 9 plays, 62 yards, 5:51.

Second quarter

- IDST – Michael Shulikov 8-yard pass from Hunter Hays (Gabe Panikowski kick), 1:04. Vandals 10–7. Drive: 14 plays, 80 yards, 5:16.
- IDHO – Mark Hamper 15-yard pass from Jack Layne (Cameron Pope kick), 0:38. Vandals 17–7. Drive: 3 plays, 27 yards, 0:14.

Third quarter

- IDHO – Andrew Marshall 100-yard kickoff return (Cameron Pope kick), 14:48. Vandals 24–7. Drive: 6 plays, 74 yards, 0:38.
- IDST – Gabe Panikowski 27-yard field goal, 10:45. Vandals 24–10. Drive: 11 plays, 66 yards, 4:03.
- IDHO – Jordan Dwyer 9-yard pass from Jack Layne (PAT blocked), 5:17. Vandals 30–10. Drive: 10 plays, 80 yards, 5:18.

Fourth quarter

- IDST – Kobe Tracy 3-yard run (Gabe Panikowski kick), 10:27. Vandals 30–17. Drive: 7 plays, 45 yards, 2:46.
- IDHO – Cameron Pope 34-yard field goal, 2:46. Vandals 33–17. Drive: 5 plays, 35 yards, 1:50.
- IDHO – Carlos Matheney 9-yard run (Cameron Pope kick), 1:54. Vandals 40–17. Drive: 2 plays, 8 yards, 0:23.

| Statistics | IDHO | IDST |
|---|---|---|
| First downs | 21 | 24 |
| Total yards | 415 | 373 |
| Rushing yards | 181 | 111 |
| Passing yards | 234 | 262 |
| Passing: Comp–Att–Int | 17-22-0 | 29–47–3 |
| Time of possession | 31:23 | 28:37 |

| Team | Category | Player | Statistics |
|---|---|---|---|
| Idaho | Passing | Jack Layne | 17/22, 234 yards, 3 TD |
| Idaho | Rushing | Nate Thomas | 21 carries, 171 yards |
| Idaho | Receiving | Jordan Dwyer | 11 receptions, 134 yards, TD |
| Idaho State | Passing | Kobe Tracy | 27/44, 249 yards, 3 INT |
| Idaho State | Rushing | Dason Brooks | 6 carries, 56 yards |
| Idaho State | Receiving | Michael Shulikov | 6 receptions, 61 yards, TD |

=== Lehigh (NCAA Division I playoff–second round) ===
Lehigh Mountain Hawks at No. 8 Idaho Vandals Game summary

| Quarter | 1 | 2 | 3 | 4 | Total |
|---|---|---|---|---|---|
| Mountain Hawks | 0 | 6 | 0 | 7 | 13 |
| No. 8 Vandals | 6 | 13 | 15 | 0 | 34 |

at Kibbie Dome • Moscow, Idaho

- Date: December 7
- Game time: 2:00 p.m. EST/11:00 p.m. PST
- TV announcers (ESPN+): Shawn Kenney, Marcus Ray

Game information

First quarter

- IDHO – Jordan Dwyer 5-yard pass from Jack Layne (PAT failed), 4:27. Vandals 6–0. Drive: 14 plays, 80 yards, 6:57.

Second quarter

- IDHO – Jordan Dwyer 62-yard pass from Jack Layne (2-point pass conversion failed), 11:50. Vandals 12–0. Drive: 5 plays, 89 yards, 1:04.
- LEH – Nick Garrido 35-yard field goal, 6:26. Vandals 12–3. Drive: 11 plays, 57 yards, 5:24.
- IDHO – Mark Hamper 42-yard pass from Jack Layne (Cameron Pope kick), 1:33. Vandals 19–3. Drive: 1 play, 42 yards, 0:07.
- LEH – Nick Garrido 39-yard field goal, 0:00. Vandals 19–6. Drive: 10 plays, 53 yards, 1:33.

Third quarter

- IDHO – Deshaun Buchanan 2-yard run (Jack Layne pass to Jordan Dwyer for 2-point conversion), 10:59. Vandals 27–6. Drive: 10 plays, 75 yards, 3:55.
- IDHO – Zach Johnson 74-yard interception return (Cameron Pope kick), 6:30. Vandals 34–6. Drive: 11 plays, 75 yards, 4:29.

Fourth quarter

- LEH – Dante Perri 1-yard run (Nick Garrido kick), 0:28. Vandals 34–13. Drive: 8 plays, 70 yards, 3:46.

| Statistics | LEH | IDHO |
|---|---|---|
| First downs | 20 | 19 |
| Total yards | 371 | 410 |
| Rushing yards | 169 | 92 |
| Passing yards | 202 | 318 |
| Passing: Comp–Att–Int | 17-31-1 | 16–22–0 |
| Time of possession | 31:18 | 28:42 |

| Team | Category | Player | Statistics |
|---|---|---|---|
| Lehigh | Passing | Hayden Johnson | 13/27, 143 yards, INT |
| Lehigh | Rushing | Luke Yoder | 11 carries, 74 yards |
| Lehigh | Receiving | Mason Humphrey | 6 receptions, 98 yards |
| Idaho | Passing | Jack Layne | 16/22, 318 yards, 3 TD |
| Idaho | Rushing | Deshaun Buchanan | 15 carries, 42 yards, TD |
| Idaho | Receiving | Jordan Dwyer | 7 receptions, 166 yards, 2 TD |

=== at No. 1 Montana State (NCAA Division I Playoff–Quarterfinal) ===
NCAA Division I Playoff–Quarterfinal – No. 7 Idaho Vandals (10–3) at No. 1 Montana State (13–0) – Game summary

| Quarter | 1 | 2 | 3 | 4 | Total |
|---|---|---|---|---|---|
| No. 7 Vandals | 7 | 3 | 0 | 9 | 19 |
| No. 1 Bobcats | 7 | 24 | 14 | 7 | 52 |

at Bobcat Stadium • Bozeman, MT

- Date: Friday December 13, 2024
- Game time: 7:00 p.m.
- TV announcers (ESPN): Clay Matvick (play-by-play), Rene Ingoglia (analyst) and Morgan Uber (sideline)

Game information

First quarter

- (10:07) MTST – Ryan Schlepp 3 yard pass from Tommy Mellott, Myles Sansted kick (Drive: 9 plays, 75 yards, 4:53; MTST 7–0)
- (2:22) IDHO – Jordan Dwyer 55 yard pass from Jack Layne, Cameron Pope kick (Drive: 1 play, 55 yards, 0:08; Tied 7–7)

Second quarter

- (11:19) MTST – Myles Sansted 48 yard field goal (Drive: 13 plays, 46 yards, 6:03; MTST 10–7)
- (8:22) IDHO – Cameron Pope 32 yard field goal (Drive: 6 plays, 60 yards, 2:57; Tied 10–10)
- (3:47) MTST – Tommy Mellott 8 yard run, Myles Sansted kick (Drive: 8 plays, 38 yards, 4:35; MTST 17–10)
- (1:15) MTST – Adam Jones 2 yard run, Myles Sansted kick (Drive: 5 plays, 28 yards, 1:49; MTST 24–10)
- (0:08) MTST – Adam Jones 1 yard run, Myles Sansted kick (Drive: 4 plays, 65 yards, 0:27; MTST 31–10)

Third quarter

- (9:41) MTST – Adam Jones 9 yard run, Myles Sansted kick (Drive: 8 plays, 45 yards, 5:07; MTST 38–10)
- (0:59) MTST – Taco Dowler 5 yard pass from Tommy Mellott, Myles Sansted kick (Drive: 9 plays, 41 yards, 6:23; MTST 45–10)

Fourth quarter

- (14:04) MTST – Adam Jones 2 yard run, Myles Sansted kick (Drive: 3 plays, 60 yards, 1:12; MTST 52–10)
- (12:31) IDHO – Jordan Dwyer 25 yard pass from Jack Layne, 2-point conversion failed (Drive: 6 plays, 75 yards, 1:33; MTST 52–16)
- (3:55) IDHO – Cameron Pope 43 yard field goal (Drive: 14 plays, 73 yards, 5:45; MTST 52–19)

| Statistics | IDHO | MTST |
|---|---|---|
| First downs | 17 | 20 |
| Total yards | 407 | 457 |
| Rushing yards | 143 | 283 |
| Passing yards | 264 | 174 |
| Passing: Comp–Att–Int | 23-36-1 | 12–19–1 |
| Time of possession | 21:09 | 38:51 |

| Team | Category | Player | Statistics |
|---|---|---|---|
| Idaho | Passing | Jack Layne | 20/30, 239 yards, 2 TD, INT |
| Idaho | Rushing | Deshaun Buchanan | 10 carries, 95 yards |
| Idaho | Receiving | Jordan Dwyer | 11 receptions, 189 yards, 2 TD |
| Montana State | Passing | Tommy Mellott | 12/18, 174 yards, 2 TD, INT |
| Montana State | Rushing | Tommy Mellott | 14 carries, 131 yards, TD |
| Montana State | Receiving | Adam Jones | 3 receptions, 66 yards |
