= 2024 Wyoming Cowboys football team =

American college football season

2024 Wyoming Cowboys football
- Conference: Mountain West Conference
- Record: 3–9 (2–5 MW)
- Head coach: Jay Sawvel (1st season)
- Offensive coordinator: Jay Johnson (1st season)
- Offensive scheme: Multiple
- Defensive coordinator: Aaron Bohl (1st season)
- Base defense: 4–3
- Home stadium: War Memorial Stadium

2024 Mountain West Conference football standings
	Conf.			Overall
Team	W		L	W		L
No. 8 Boise State y$^	7	–	0	12	–	2
No. 23 UNLV y	6	–	1	11	–	3
Colorado State	6	–	1	8	–	5
Fresno State	4	–	3	6	–	7
San Jose State	3	–	4	7	–	6
Air Force	3	–	4	5	–	7
Hawaii	3	–	4	5	–	7
New Mexico	3	–	4	5	–	7
Utah State	3	–	4	4	–	8
San Diego State	2	–	5	3	–	9
Wyoming	2	–	5	3	–	9
Nevada	0	–	7	3	–	10
Championship: Boise State 21, UNLV 7
^ – College Football Playoff participant; $ – Conference champion; y – Championship game participant; Rankings from AP Poll

The 2024 Wyoming Cowboys football team represented the University of Wyoming as a member Mountain West Conference (MW) during the 2024 NCAA Division I FBS football season. Led by first-year head coach Jay Sawvel, the Cowboys compiled an overall record of 3–9 record with mark 2–5 in conference play, tying for tenth place in the MW. The team played home games at War Memorial Stadium in Laramie, Wyoming.

Previously the Cowboys' defensive coordinator for four years, Sawvel was promoted to head coach in December 2023, following the retirement of Craig Bohl, who led the program for ten seasons.

== Schedule ==
Date	Time	Opponent	Site	TV	Result	Attendance
August 31	8:30 p.m.	at Arizona State*	Mountain America Stadium; Tempe, AZ	FS1	L 7–48	48,108
September 7	1:30 p.m.	No. 7 (FCS) Idaho*	War Memorial Stadium; Laramie, WY	TruTV	L 13–17	25,070
September 14	7:00 p.m.	BYU*	War Memorial Stadium; Laramie, WY	CBSSN	L 14–34	24,513
September 21	5:00 p.m.	at North Texas*	DATCU Stadium; Denton, TX	ESPN+	L 17–44	27,049
September 28	6:00 p.m.	Air Force^{†}	War Memorial Stadium; Laramie, WY	CBSSN	W 31–19	23,068
October 12	1:30 p.m.	San Diego State	War Memorial Stadium; Laramie, WY	CBSSN	L 24–27	23,155
October 19	2:00 p.m.	at San Jose State	CEFCU Stadium; San Jose, CA	NBCSBA	L 14–24	17,101
October 26	5:00 p.m.	Utah State	War Memorial Stadium; Laramie, WY (rivalry)	CBSSN	L 25–27	17,724
November 2	2:00 p.m.	at New Mexico	University Stadium; Albuquerque, NM	TruTV	W 49–45	15,046
November 15	6:00 p.m.	at Colorado State	Canvas Stadium; Fort Collins, CO (Border War)	CBSSN	L 10–24	36,720
November 23	5:00 p.m.	No. 12 Boise State	War Memorial Stadium; Laramie, WY	CBSSN	L 13–17	18,094
November 30	4:30 p.m.	at Washington State*	Martin Stadium; Pullman, WA	The CW	W 15–14	17,088
*Non-conference game; ^{†}Homecoming; Rankings from AP Poll and CFP Rankings released prior to game; All times are in Mountain time

== Game summaries ==
=== at Arizona State ===
Wyoming Cowboys at Arizona State Sun Devils – Game summary

Quarter	1	2	3	4	Total
Cowboys	0	0	0	7	7
Sun Devils	17	10	21	0	48

at Mountain America Stadium, Tempe, Arizona

- Date: August 31
- Game time: 8:30 p.m. MDT/7:30 p.m. MST
- Game weather: 99 °F (37 °C)
- Game attendance: 48,108
- Referee: Henry Johns
- TV announcers (FS1): Chris Myers and Petros Papadakis
- Recap

Game information

First quarter

- (14:19) ASU – Zyrus Fiaseu 29 yard interception return, Ian Hershey kick (Drive: 2 plays, 1 yard, 0:41; ASU 7–0)
- (6:19) ASU – Ian Hershey 29 yard field goal (Drive: 7 plays, 30 yards, 3:42; ASU 10–0)
- (0:00) ASU – DeCarlos Brooks 8 yard run, Ian Hershey kick (Drive: 10 plays, 72 yards, 5:00; ASU 17–0)

Second quarter

- (9:47) ASU – Cam Skattebo 3 yard run, Ian Hershey kick (Drive: 7 plays, 43 yards, 3:14; ASU 24–0)
- (4:28) ASU – Ian Hershey 24 yard field goal (Drive: 8 plays, 52 yards, 3:23; ASU 27–0)

Third quarter

- (11:03) ASU – Chamon Metayer 25 yard pass from Sam Leavitt, Ian Hershey kick (Drive: 9 plays, 75 yards, 3:57; ASU 34–0)
- (6:07) ASU – Justin Wodtly 6 yard fumble return, Ian Hershey kick (Drive: 2 plays, -14 yards, 0:38; ASU 41–0)
- (3:34) ASU – Kyson Brown 68 yard pass from Sam Leavitt, Ian Hershey kick (Drive: 3 plays, 67 yards, 1:46; ASU 48–0)

Fourth quarter

- (0:02) WYO – Chris Durr Jr. 3 yard pass from Kaden Anderson, John Hoyland kick (Drive: 9 plays, 74 yards, 2:14; ASU 48–7)

Statistics	WYO	ASU
First downs	8	27
Total yards	118	499
Rushing yards	40	241
Passing yards	78	258
Passing: Comp–Att–Int	10–20–2	14–22–0
Time of possession	22:56	37:04

Team	Category	Player	Statistics
Wyoming	Passing	Evan Svoboda	6/15, 42 yards, 2 INT
Wyoming	Rushing	DJ Jones	17 carries, 43 yards
Wyoming	Receiving	Tyler King	1 reception, 23 yards
Arizona State	Passing	Sam Leavitt	14/22, 258 yards, 2 TD
Arizona State	Rushing	Cam Skattebo	11 carries, 49 yards, TD
Arizona State	Receiving	Kyson Brown	2 receptions, 73 yards, TD

=== No. 7 (FCS) Idaho ===
No. 7 (FCS) Idaho Vandals at Wyoming Cowboys – Game summary

Quarter	1	2	3	4	Total
No. 7 (FCS) Vandals	7	10	0	0	17
Cowboys	10	0	0	3	13

at War Memorial Stadium, Laramie, Wyoming

- Date: September 7
- Game time: 1:30 p.m. MDT
- Game weather: Sunny, 75 °F (24 °C)
- Game attendance: 25,070
- Referee: Scott Hardin
- TV announcers (TruTV): Ari Wolfe, Darius Walker, and Jared Greenberg
- Box score, Recap

Game information

First quarter

- (12:50) WYO – John Hoyland 48 yard field goal (Drive: 6 plays, 44 yards, 2:10; WYO 3–0)
- (6:36) IDH – Elisha Cummings 3 yard run, Cameron Pope kick (Drive: 7 plays, 37 yars, 3:57; IDH 7–3)
- (2:06) WYO – Devin Boddie 20 yard pass from Evan Svoboda, John Hoyland kick (Drive: 9 plays, 72 yards, 4:23; WYO 10–7)

Second quarter

- (11:33) IDH – Jake Cox 2 yard pass from Jack Wagner, Cameron Pope kick (Drive: 10 plays, 75 yards, 5:33; IDH 14–10)
- (4:40) IDH – Cameron Pope 49 yard field goal (Drive: 7 plays, 32 yards, 3:43; IDH 17–10)

Third quarter

No scoring

Fourth quarter

- (14:57) WYO – John Hoyland 22 yard field goal (Drive: 8 plays, 45 yards, 3:29; IDH 17–13)

Statistics	IDHO	WYO
First downs	14	16
Total yards	225	270
Rushing yards	124	144
Passing yards	101	126
Passing: Comp–Att–Int	12–21–0	10–26–0
Time of possession	31:20	28:40

Team	Category	Player	Statistics
Idaho	Passing	Jack Wagner	12/21, 101 yards, 1 TD
Idaho	Rushing	Nate Thomas	15 carries, 64 yards
Idaho	Receiving	Jordan Dwyer	6 receptions, 66 yards
Wyoming	Passing	Evan Svoboda	10/24, 126 yards, 1 TD
Wyoming	Rushing	DJ Jones	17 carries, 80 yards
Wyoming	Receiving	Will Pelissier	1 reception, 38 yards

=== BYU ===
BYU Cougars at Wyoming Cowboys – Game summary

Quarter	1	2	3	4	Total
Cougars	7	10	17	0	34
Cowboys	0	7	0	7	14

at War Memorial Stadium, Laramie, Wyoming

- Date: September 14
- Game time: 7:00 p.m. MDT
- Game weather: Clear, 68 °F (20 °C)
- Game attendance: 24,513
- Referee: Cal McNeill
- TV announcers (CBSSN): Carter Blackburn, Randy Cross, and Brandon Baylor
- Box score, Recap

Game information

First quarter

- (5:58) BYU – Keanu Hill 20 yard pass from Jake Retzlaff, Will Ferrin kick (Drive: 7 plays, 44 yards, 3:24; BYU 7–0)

Second quarter

- (9:12) BYU – Kody Epps 3 yard pass from Jake Retzlaff, Will Ferrin kick (Drive: 9 plays, 74 yards, 4:23; BYU 14–0)
- (5:11) WYO – Evan Svoboda 2 yard run, John Hoyland kick (Drive: 11 plays, 75 yards, 4:01; BYU 14–7)
- (0:45) BYU – Will Ferrin 45 yard field goal (Drive: 7 plays, 43 yards, 2:04; BYU 17–7)

Third quarter

- (14:45) BYU – Keelan Marion 100 yard kickoff return, Will Ferrin kick (BYU 24–7)
- (9:42) BYU – Will Ferrin 37 yard field goal (Drive: 8 plays, 45 yards, 4:07; BYU 27–7)
- (0:02) BYU – Darius Lassiter 20 yard pass from Jake Retzlaff, Will Ferrin kick (Drive: 5 plays, 77 yards, 2:33; BYU 34–7)

Fourth quarter

- (6:29) WYO – Evan Svoboda 1 yard run, John Hoyland kick (Drive: 12 plays, 76 yards, 5:10; BYU 34–14)

Statistics	BYU	WYO
First downs	23	13
Total yards	458	217
Rushing yards	140	77
Passing yards	318	140
Passing: Comp–Att–Int	25–39–1	14–32–1
Time of possession	33:22	26:38

Team	Category	Player	Statistics
BYU	Passing	Jake Retzlaff	22/36, 291 yards, 3 TD, 1 INT
BYU	Rushing	Jake Retzlaff	6 carries, 62 yards
BYU	Receiving	Chase Roberts	6 receptions, 129 yards
Wyoming	Passing	Evan Svoboda	14/32, 140 yards, 1 INT
Wyoming	Rushing	Evan Svoboda	10 carries, 42 yards, 2 TD
Wyoming	Receiving	Tyler King	3 receptions, 52 yards

=== at North Texas ===
Wyoming Cowboys at North Texas Mean Green – Game summary

Quarter	1	2	3	4	Total
Cowboys	3	14	0	0	17
Mean Green	7	20	14	3	44

at DATCU Stadium, Denton, Texas

- Date: September 21
- Game time: 5:00 p.m. MDT/6:00 p.m. CDT
- Game weather: Sunny, 94 °F (34 °C)
- Game attendance: 27,049
- Referee: Charles Lamertina
- TV announcers (ESPN+): James Westling (play-by-play) and Leger Douzable (analyst)
- Box Score, Recap

Game information

First quarter

- (9:54) WYO – John Hoyland 30 yard field goal (Drive: 11 plays, 62 yards, 5:06; WYO 3–0)
- (7:18) UNT – DT Sheffield 29 yard pass from Chandler Morris, Kali Nguma kick (Drive: 7 plays, 75 yards, 2:36; UNT 7–3)

Second quarter

- (14:12) UNT – Kali Nguma 23 yard field goal (Drive: 14 plays, 80 yards, 4:47; UNT 10–3)
- (5:54) UNT – Blair Conwright 19 yard pass from Chandler Morris, Kali Nguma kick (Drive: 8 plays, 75 yards, 4:09; UNT 17–3)
- (2:15) WYO – Sam Scott 41 yard pass from Evan Svoboda, John Hoyland kick (Drive: 8 plays, 75 yards, 3:39; UNT 17–10)
- (1:17) UNT – Makenzie McGill 4 yard run, Kali Nguma kick (Drive: 7 plays, 76 yards, 0:53; UNT 24–10)
- (1:03) WYO – Tyler King 100 yard kickoff return, John Hoyland kick (UNT 24–17)
- (0:00) UNT – Kali Nguma 45 yard field goal (Drive: 8 plays, 48 yards, 1:03; UNT 27–17)

Third quarter

- (10:10) UNT – Makenzie McGill 2 yard run, Kali Nguma kick (Drive: 6 plays, 35 yards, 2:07; UNT 34–17)
- (5:17) UNT – Makenzie McGill 24 yard run, Kali Nguma kick (Drive: 7 plays, 92 yards, 3:55; UNT 41–17)

Fourth quarter

- (2:07) UNT – Kali Nguma 34 yard field goal (Drive: 7 plays, 20 yards, 5:01; UNT 44–17)

Statistics	WYO	UNT
First downs	15	28
Total yards	244	534
Rushing yards	69	216
Passing yards	175	318
Passing: Comp–Att–Int	15–28–0	30–43–0
Time of possession	28:13	31:47

Team	Category	Player	Statistics
Wyoming	Passing	Evan Svoboda	11/23, 155 yards, 1 TD
Wyoming	Rushing	Sam Scott	11 carries, 39 yards
Wyoming	Receiving	John Michael Gyllenborg	5 receptions, 56 yards
North Texas	Passing	Chandler Morris	28/41, 305 yards, 2 TD
North Texas	Rushing	Shane Porter	13 carries, 120 yards
North Texas	Receiving	DT Sheffield	8 receptions, 109 yards, 1 TD

=== Air Force ===
Air Force Falcons at Wyoming Cowboys – Game summary

Quarter	1	2	3	4	Total
Falcons	0	13	0	6	19
Cowboys	7	0	14	10	31

at War Memorial Stadium, Laramie, Wyoming

- Date: September 28
- Game time: 6:00 p.m. MDT
- Game weather: Sunny, 78 °F (26 °C)
- Game attendance: 23,068
- Referee: Nolan Dumas
- TV announcers (CBSSN): Rich Waltz (play-by-play) and Robert Turbin (analyst)
- Box Score, Recap

Game information

First quarter

- (9:36) WYO – Sam Scott 8 yard run, John Hoyland kick (Drive: 6 plays, 46 yards, 2:17; WYO 7–0)

Second quarter

- (14:56) AFA – Matthew Dapore 28 yard field goal (Drive: 12 plays, 72 yards, 6:34; WYO 7–3)
- (6:47) AFA – Kade Frew 4 yard run, Matthew Dapore kick (Drive: 9 plays, 81 yards, 5:42; AFA 10–7)
- (0:23) AFA – Matthew Dapore 27 yard field goal (Drive: 9 plays, 54 yards, 2:41; AFA 13–7)

Third quarter

- (11:54) WYO – Evan Svoboda 1 yard run, John Hoyland kick (Drive: 7 plays, 76 yards, 2:58; WYO 14–13)
- (3:32) WYO – Tyler King 3 yard run, John Hoyland kick (Drive: 11 plays, 94 yards, 5:56; WYO 21–13)

Fourth quarter

- (10:36) WYO – John Hoyland 23 yard field goal (Drive: 13 plays, 61 yards, 6:31; WYO 24–13)
- (7:00) AFA – Aiden Calvert 37 yard run, failed 2 point conversion (Drive: 7 plays, 75 yards, 3:36; WYO 24–19)
- (2:13) WYO – Evan Svoboda 17 yard run, John Hoyland kick (Drive: 9 plays, 75 yards, 4:47; WYO 31–19)

Statistics	AFA	WYO
First downs	19	19
Total yards	320	361
Rushing yards	205	173
Passing yards	115	188
Passing: Comp–Att–Int	6–13–0	16–22–0
Time of possession	28:32	31:28

Team	Category	Player	Statistics
Air Force	Passing	John Busha	6/13, 115 yards
Air Force	Rushing	Aiden Calvert	3 carries, 54 yards, 1 TD
Air Force	Receiving	Cade Harris	5 receptions, 106 yards
Wyoming	Passing	Evan Svoboda	15/21, 165 yards
Wyoming	Rushing	Sam Scott	19 carries, 97 yards, 1 TD
Wyoming	Receiving	Chris Durr	3 receptions, 71 yards

=== San Diego State ===
San Diego State Aztecs at Wyoming Cowboys – Game summary

Quarter	1	2	3	4	Total
Aztecs	10	7	0	10	27
Cowboys	7	7	3	7	24

at War Memorial Stadium, Laramie, Wyoming

- Date: October 12
- Game time: 1:30 p.m. MDT
- Game weather: Sunny, 71 °F (22 °C)
- Game attendance: 23,155
- Referee: Jonathan Noli
- TV announcers (CBSSN): Chris Lewis (play-by-play) and Taylor McHargue (analyst)
- Box Score, Recap

Game information

First quarter

- SDSU (6:27) – Gabriel Plascencia 22 yard field goal; 4 plays, 6 yards, 1:21 (SDSU 3-0)
- WYO (5:46) – Jaylen Sargent 70 yard pass from Evan Svoboda (John Hoyland kick); 2 plays, 75 yards, 0:41 (WYO 7-3)
- SDSU (0:02) – Eric Butler 43 yard interception return (Gabriel Plascencia kick); 2 plays, 19 yards, 0:29 (SDSU 10-7)

Second quarter

- WYO (9:08) – Sam Scott 1 yard run (John Hoyland kick); 12 plays, 75 yards, 5:54 (WYO 14-10)
- SDSU (5:14) – Marquez Cooper 4 yard run (Gabriel Plascencia kick); 8 plays, 75 yards, 3:54 (SDSU 17-14)

Third quarter

- WYO (10:05) – John Hoyland 42 yard field goal; 15 plays, 50 yards, 4:55 (Tied 17-17)

Fourth quarter

- WYO (14:50) – Evan Svoboda 51 yard run (John Hoyland kick); 6 plays, 78 yards, 2:17 (WYO 24-17)
- SDSU (13:54) – Jordan Napier 27 yard pass from Danny O'Neil; 4 plays, 80 yards, 0:49 (Tied 24-24)
- SDSU (7:35) – Gabriel Plascencia 28 yard field goal; 7 plays, 77 yards, 3:36 (SDSU 27-24)

Statistics	SDSU	WYO
First downs	16	19
Total yards	356	371
Rushing yards	102	190
Passing yards	254	181
Passing: Comp–Att–Int	16–27–1	12–31–2
Time of possession	29:17	30:43

Team	Category	Player	Statistics
San Diego State	Passing	Danny O'Neil	16/27, 254 yards, TD, INT
San Diego State	Rushing	Marquez Cooper	25 carries, 87 yards, TD
San Diego State	Receiving	Jordan Napier	4 receptions, 91 yards, TD
Wyoming	Passing	Evan Svoboda	12/31, 181 yards, TD, 2 INT
Wyoming	Rushing	Sam Scott	20 carries, 94 yards, TD
Wyoming	Receiving	Jaylen Sargent	2 receptions, 84 yards, TD

=== at San Jose State ===
Wyoming Cowboys at San Jose State Spartans – Game summary

Quarter	1	2	3	4	Total
Cowboys	0	0	7	7	14
Spartans	7	7	3	7	24

at CEFCU Stadium • San Jose, California

- Date: October 19
- Game time: 2:00 p.m. MDT/1:00 p.m. PDT
- Game weather: Sunny, 77 °F (25 °C)
- Game attendance: 17,101
- Referee: Patrick Foy
- TV announcers (NBCSBA): Larry Beil (play-by-play) and David Fales (analyst)
- Box Score, Recap

Game information

First quarter

- SJSU (13:45) – Floyd Chalk 39 yard run (Kyler Halvorsen kick); 5 plays, 75 yards, 1:15 (SJSU 7–0)

Second quarter

- SJSU (0:21) – Nick Nash 17 yard pass from Walker Eget (Kyler Halvorsen kick); 11 plays, 97 yards, 1:52 (SJSU 14–0)

Third quarter

- WYO (8:33) – Justin Stevenson 18 yard pass from Evan Svoboda (John Hoyland kick); 5 plays, 55 yards, 1:45 (SJSU 14–7)
- SJSU (6:08) – Kyler Halvorsen 26 yard field goal; 6 plays, 66 yards, 2:25 (SJSU 17–7)

Fourth quarter

- SJSU (7:16) – Jabari Bates 19 yard run (Kyler Halvorsen kick); 8 plays, 86 yards, 4:11 (SJSU 24–7)
- WYO (0:43) – John Michael Gyllenborg 63 yard pass from Kaden Anderson (John Hoyland kick); 1 play, 63 yards, 0:11 (SJSU 24–14)

Statistics	WYO	SJSU
First downs	19	20
Total yards	366	498
Rushing yards	56	176
Passing yards	310	322
Passing: Comp–Att–Int	18–38–3	21–39–2
Time of possession	36:16	23:44

Team	Category	Player	Statistics
Wyoming	Passing	Evan Svoboda	14/27, 194 yards, 1 TD, 1 INT
Wyoming	Rushing	Sam Scott	14 carries, 35 yards
Wyoming	Receiving	John Michael Gyllenborg	5 receptions, 137 yards, 1 TD
San Jose State	Passing	Walker Eget	20/38, 318 yards, 1 TD, 2 INT
San Jose State	Rushing	Floyd Chalk	12 carries, 91 yards, 1 TD
San Jose State	Receiving	Justin Lockhart	4 receptions, 129 yards

=== Utah State ===
Utah State Aggies at Wyoming Cowboys – Game summary

Quarter	1	2	3	4	Total
Aggies	7	10	0	10	27
Cowboys	3	7	6	9	25

at War Memorial Stadium, Laramie, Wyoming

- Date: October 26
- Game time: 5:00 p.m. MDT
- Game weather: Sunny, 65 °F (18 °C)
- Game attendance: 17,724
- Referee: Cal McNeill
- TV announcers (CBSSN): John Sadak (play-by-play) and Luke Kuechly (analyst)
- Recap, Box Score

Game information

First quarter

- USU (12:27) – Otto Tia 36 yard pass from Spencer Petras (Tanner Cragun kick); 7 plays, 75 yards, 2:33 (USU 7–0)
- WYO (5:19) – John Hoyland 43 yard field goal; 8 plays, 55 yards, 3:25 (USU 7–3)

Second quarter

- WYO (11:19) – Sam Scott 11 yard run (John Hoyland kick); 10 plays, 70 yards, 5:05 (WYO 10–7)
- USU (1:19) – Tanner Cragun 39 yard field goal; 12 plays, 65 yards, 4:30 (Tied 10–10)
- USU (0:19) – Rahsul Faison 8 yard run (Tanner Cragun kick); 2 plays, 44 yards, 0:16 (USU 17–10)

Third quarter

- WYO (9:30) – John Hoyland 27 yard field goal; 12 plays, 66 yards, 5:30 (USU 17–13)
- WYO (3:08) – John Hoyland 23 yard field goal; 12 plays, 69 yards, 5:06 (USU 17–16)

Fourth quarter

- WYO (13:36) – Tyler King 54 yard run (2-point conversion failed); 1 play, 54 yards, 0:09 (WYO 22–17)
- USU (11:58) – Josh Sterzer 10 yard pass from Spencer Petras (Tanner Cragun kick); 5 plays, 75 yards, 1:38 (USU 24–22)
- WYO (1:57) – John Hoyland 31 yard field goal; 10 plays, 66 yards, 5:21 (WYO 25–24)
- USU (0:00) – Tanner Cragun 40 yard field goal; 12 plays, 53 yards, 1:57 (USU 27–25)

Statistics	USU	WYO
First downs	23	24
Total yards	378	470
Rushing yards	148	276
Passing yards	230	194
Passing: Comp–Att–Int	26–41–0	17–31–1
Time of possession	25:10	34:50

Team	Category	Player	Statistics
Utah State	Passing	Spencer Petras	25/39, 194 yards, 2 TD
Utah State	Rushing	Rahsul Faison	23 carries, 131 yards, 1 TD
Utah State	Receiving	Otto Tia	6 receptions, 76 yards, 1 TD
Wyoming	Passing	Kaden Anderson	15/24, 182 yards
Wyoming	Rushing	Sam Scott	11 carries, 115 yards, 1 TD
Wyoming	Receiving	Chris Durr	9 receptions, 83 yards

=== at New Mexico ===
Wyoming Cowboys at New Mexico Lobos – Game summary

Quarter	1	2	3	4	Total
Cowboys	14	21	0	14	49
Lobos	13	22	10	0	45

at University Stadium, Albuquerque, New Mexico

- Date: November 2
- Game time: 2:00 p.m. MDT
- Game weather: Sunny, 68 °F (20 °C)
- Game attendance: 15,046
- Referee: Christian Watson
- TV announcers (TruTV): Ari Wolfe (play-by-play) and Darius Walker (analyst)
- Recap, Box Score

Game information

First quarter

- (12:33) UNM – Ryan Davis 10-yard pass from Devon Dampier (Drive: 7 plays, 75 yards, 2:27; New Mexico 6–0)
- (8:41) WYO – Jamari Ferrell 1-yard run, John Hoyland kick (Drive: 9 plays, 75 yards, 3:48; Wyoming 7–6)
- (5:56) UNM – Eli Sanders 34-yard run, Luke Drzewiecki kick (Drive: 8 plays, 75 yards, 2:45; New Mexico 13–7)
- (2:02) WYO – John Michael Gyllenborg 15-yard pass from Kaden Anderson, John Hoyland kick (Drive: 9 plays, 45 yards, 3:46; Wyoming 14–13)

Second quarter

- (14:55) WYO – Kaden Anderson 7-yard run, John Hoyland kick (Drive: 4 plays, 35 yards, 1:17; Wyoming 21–13)
- (11:22) UNM – Devon Dampier 18-yard run, Trace Bruckler rush (Drive: 9 plays, 69 yards, 3:27; Tied 21–21)
- (9:54) WYO – Jaylen Sargent 68-yard pass from Kaden Anderson, John Hoyland kick (Drive: 3 plays, 79 yards, 1:23; Wyoming 28–21)
- (5:20) UNM – Devon Dampier 40-yard run, Luke Drzewiecki kick (Drive: 4 plays, 61 yards, 1:09; Tied 28–28)
- (1:57) WYO – Harrison Waylee 6-yard run, John Hoyland kick (Drive: 7 plays, 75 yards, 3:23; Wyoming 35–28)
- (1:36) UNM – Eli Sanders 75-yard run, Luke Drzewiecki kick (Drive: 2 plays, 81 yards, 0:15; Tied 35–35)

Third quarter

- (9:29) UNM – Luke Drzewiecki 30-yard field goal (Drive: 7 plays, 50 yards, 2:00; New Mexico 38–35)
- (0:40) UNM – Devon Dampier 85-yard run, Luke Drzewiecki kick (Drive: 2 plays, 92 yards, 0:38; New Mexico 45–35)

Fourth quarter

- (12:55) WYO – Wrook Brown 29-yard interception, John Hoyland kick (New Mexico 45–42)
- (4:44) WYO – Justin Stevenson 27-yard pass from Kaden Anderson, John Hoyland kick (Drive: 11 plays, 88 yards, 5:51; Wyoming 49–45)

Statistics	WYO	UNM
First downs	30	22
Total yards	604	576
Rushing yards	262	412
Passing yards	342	164
Passing: Comp–Att–Int	20–29–1	16–31–1
Time of possession	37:13	22:47

Team	Category	Player	Statistics
Wyoming	Passing	Kaden Anderson	20/29, 342 yards, 3 TD, INT
Wyoming	Rushing	Harrison Waylee	27 carries, 170 yards, TD
Wyoming	Receiving	Jaylen Sargent	6 receptions, 186 yards, TD
New Mexico	Passing	Devon Dampier	16/31, 164 yards, TD, INT
New Mexico	Rushing	Devon Dampier	12 carries, 207 yards, 3 TD
New Mexico	Receiving	Ryan Davis	6 receptions, 74 yards, TD

=== at Colorado State ===
Wyoming Cowboys at Colorado State Rams – Game summary

Quarter	1	2	3	4	Total
Cowboys	0	3	7	0	10
Rams	14	3	7	0	24

at Canvas Stadium, Fort Collins, Colorado

- Date: November 15
- Game time: 6:00 p.m. MST
- Game weather: Clear, 41 °F (5 °C)
- Game attendance: 36,720
- Referee: Patrick Foy
- TV announcers (CBSSN): Chris Lewis (play-by-play) and Donte Whitner (analyst)
- Recap, Box Score

Game information

First quarter

- (11:39) CSU – Avery Morrow 11-yard run, Jordan Noyes kick (Drive: 6 plays, 75 yards, 3:21; CSU 7–0)
- (0:28) CSU – Baryden Fowler-Nicolosi 6-yard pass from Dane Olson, Jordan Noyes kick (Drive: 5 plays, 83 yards, 2:43; CSU 14–0)

Second quarter

- (12:15) WYO – John Hoyland 49-yard field goal (Drive: 6 plays, 35 yards, 3:08; CSU 14–3)
- (5:36) CSU – Jordan Noyes 22-yard field goal ('Drive: 11 plays, 78 yards, 6:32; CSU 17–3)

Third quarter

- (11:45) CSU – Tommy Maher 53-yard pass from Brayden Fowler-Nicolosi ('Drive: 2 plays, 85 yards, 0:40; CSU 24–3)
- (8:42) WYO – Kaden Anderson 1-yard run, John Hoyland kick ('Drive: 6 plays, 66 yards, 2:56; CSU 24–10)

Fourth quarter

No scoring plays

Statistics	WYO	CSU
First downs	10	17
Total yards	237	446
Rushing yards	117	248
Passing yards	120	198
Passing: Comp–Att–Int	13–30–0	15–18–0
Time of possession	25:10	34:50

Team	Category	Player	Statistics
Wyoming	Passing	Kaden Anderson	13/30, 120 yards
Wyoming	Rushing	Jamari Ferrell	6 carries, 74 yards
Wyoming	Receiving	Jaylen Sargent	3 receptions, 45 yards
Colorado State	Passing	Brayden Fowler-Nicolosi	14/17, 192 yards, 1 TD
Colorado State	Rushing	Justin Marshall	16 carries, 104 yards
Colorado State	Receiving	Tommy Maher	1 reception, 53 yards, 1 TD

=== No. 12 Boise State ===
No. 12 Boise State Broncos at Wyoming Cowboys – Game summary

Quarter	1	2	3	4	Total
No. 12 Broncos	7	3	0	7	17
Cowboys	3	7	0	3	13

at War Memorial Stadium, Laramie, Wyoming

- Date: November 23
- Game time: 5:00 p.m. MST
- Game weather: Clear, 49 °F (9 °C)
- Game attendance: 18,094
- Referee: Christian Watson
- TV announcers (CBSSN): Rich Waltz (play-by-play) and Robert Turbin (analyst)
- Recap, Box Score

Game information

First quarter

- (11:43) WYO – John Hoyland 54-yard field goal (Drive: 7 plays, 38 yards, 3:17; WYO 3–0)
- (3:40) BSU – Ashton Jeanty 61-yard run, Jonah Dalmas kick (Drive: 2 plays, 64 yards, 0:46; BSU 7–3)

Second quarter

- (9:36) WYO – Justin Stevenson 5-yard pass from Kaden Anderson, John Hoyland kick (Drive: 4 plays, 67 yards, 2:18; WYO 10–7)
- (0:00) BSU – Jonah Dalmas 24-yard field goal (Drive: 8 plays, 50 yards, 1:43; Tied 10–10)

Third quarter
Fourth quarter

- (9:03) WYO – John Hoyland 35-yard field goal (Drive: 7 plays, 70 yards, 4:25; WYO 13–10)
- (5:02) BSU – Jambres Dubar 2-yard run (Drive: 8 plays, 75 yards, 4:01; BSU 17–13)

Statistics	BSU	WYO
First downs	15	14
Total yards	352	319
Rushing yards	185	116
Passing yards	167	203
Passing: Comp–Att–Int	14–26–0	15–27–0
Time of possession	25:56	34:04

Team	Category	Player	Statistics
Boise State	Passing	Maddux Madsen	14/26, 167 yards
Boise State	Rushing	Ashton Jeanty	19 carries, 169 yards, 1 TD
Boise State	Receiving	Cameron Camper	5 receptions, 73 yards
Wyoming	Passing	Kaden Anderson	9/14, 116 yards, 1 TD
Wyoming	Rushing	Harrison Waylee	16 carries, 69 yards
Wyoming	Receiving	Jaylen Sargent	4 receptions, 86 yards

=== at Washington State ===
Wyoming Cowboys at Washington State Cougars – Game summary

Quarter	1	2	3	4	Total
Cowboys	3	3	3	6	15
Cougars	7	7	0	0	14

at Martin Stadium, Pullman, Washington

- Date: November 30
- Game time: 4:30 p.m. MST/3:30 p.m. PST
- Game weather: Clear, 40 °F (4 °C)
- Game attendance: 17,088
- Referee: John Love
- TV announcers (The CW): Ted Robinson (play-by-play), Ryan Leaf (analyst) and Nigel Burton (sideline)
- Recap, Box Score

Game information

First quarter

- (6:08) WSU – Kyle Williams 37 yard pass from John Mateer, Dean Janikowski kick (Drive: 5 plays, 70 yards, 2:12; WSU 7–0)
- (0:04) WYO – John Hoyland 40 yard field goal (Drive: 10 plays, 52 yards, 6:05; WSU 7–3)

Second quarter

- (9:42) WSU – John Mateer 2 yard run, Dean Janikowski kick (Drive: 10 plays, 74 yards, 5:18; WSU 14–3)
- (0:00) WYO – John Hoyland 22 yard field goal (Drive: 7 plays, 60 yards, 0:42; WSU 14–6)

Third quarter

- (2:07) WYO – John Hoyland 42 yard field goal (Drive: 14 plays, 62 yards, 6:02; WSU 14–9)

Fourth quarter

- (0:24) WYO – John Michael Gyllenborg 18 yard pass from Evan Svoboda, 2 point conversion failed (Drive: 14 plays, 90 yards, 3:15; WYO 15–14)

Statistics	WYO	WSU
First downs	22	15
Total yards	340	285
Rushing yards	134	103
Passing yards	206	182
Passing: Comp–Att–Int	21–34–1	16–22–1
Time of possession	34:14	25:46

Team	Category	Player	Statistics
Wyoming	Passing	Evan Svoboda	21/34, 206 yards, 1 TD, 1 INT
Wyoming	Rushing	Harrison Waylee	12 carries, 69 yards
Wyoming	Receiving	John Michael Gyllenborg	4 receptions, 61 yards, 1 TD
Washington State	Passing	John Mateer	16/22, 182 yards, 1 TD, 1 INT
Washington State	Rushing	John Mateer	18 carries, 56 yards, 1 TD
Washington State	Receiving	Kris Hutson	5 receptions, 62 yards

== Personnel ==
=== Coaching staff ===
Name	Position	Consecutive Years
Jay Sawvel	Head coach	1st
Mike Grant	Associate Head Coach/Offensive Pass Coordinator/Wide Receivers	9th
Jay Johnson	Offensive Coordinator/Quarterbacks	1st
Aaron Bohl	Defensive Coordinator/Linebackers	8th
Benny Boyd	Co-Special Teams Coordinator/Cornerbacks	5th
Gordie Haug	Recruiting Director/Running Backs	11th
Brian Hendricks	Defensive Ends	2nd
Shannon Moore	Co-Special Teams Coordinator/Tight Ends/Fullbacks	6th
Jeff Phelps	Defensive Tackles	1st
Joe Tripodi	Offensive Line	3rd
Eric Donoval	Director of Sports Performance	7th

=== Roster ===
2024 Wyoming Cowboys Football
Quarterback: 7 Jayden Clemons – senior (6'1" 212); 12 Kaden Anderson – (redshirt) freshman (6'4" 223); 13 Gage Brook – (redshirt) freshman (6'4" 215); 17 Evan Svoboda – junior (6'5" 245); 18 Deyon Batiste – freshman (6'5" 230); Running Back: 3 Dawaiian McNeely – senior (6'2" 204); 4 Harrison Waylee – senior (5'10" 203); 6 Jamari Ferrell – senior (5'8" 194); 16 DJ Jones – senior (5'11" 204); 21 Nico Hamilton – freshman (5'10" 200); 22 Sam Scott – junior (6'2" 228); 25 Dontae Burch – freshman (5'7" 177); 35 Kimball Madsen (FB) – junior (6'1" 229); 36 Caleb Driskill (FB) – senior (6'2" 241); 40 Cooper Mailand (FB) – (redshirt) freshman (6'2" 223); Wide Receiver: 2 Devin Boddie Jr. – senior (5'11" 184); 5 Tyler King – sophomore (5'9" 174); 8 Jaylen Sargent – junior (6'2" 182); 9 Alex Brown – senior (6'4" 200); 11 Justin Stevenson – (redshirt) freshman (6'1" 191); 14 Kayden LaFramboise – (redshirt) freshman (6'4" 210); 15 Chris Durr Jr. – freshman (5'10" 162); 19 Caleb Cooley – senior (5'7" 174); 23 Tyler Nystrom – freshman (6'2" 180); 24 Charlie Coenen – sophomore (6'0" 191); 33 Trey Olsen – freshman (6'1" 185); 82 Bricen Brantley – (redshirt) freshman (6'3" 166); 83 Will Pelissier – senior (6'3" 210); 88 Jaylan Bean – sophomore (6'4" 203); Tight End: 44 Tyler Hampton – junior (6'4" 241); 80 Justin Erb – sophomore (6'2" 236); 81 Hunter Kallstrom – freshman (6'4" 225); 84 John Michael Gyllenborg – junior (6'5" 245); 85 Clay Nanke – junior (6'6" 235); 86 Nick Miles – senior (6'5" 255); 87 Isaac Schoenfeld – sophomore (6'5" 253); 89 Jake Wilson – freshman (6'5" 220)	Offensive Line: 50 Giovanni Panozzo – freshman (6'5" 265); 53 Dante Gavito – sophomore (6'3" 282); 55 Tegen Seeds – freshman (6'0" 298); 57 Luke Sandy – sophomore (6'2" 230); 60 Wyatt Walters – (redshirt) freshman (6'4" 296); 62 Spencer Rathbun – freshman (6'4" 260); 63 Braylon Jenkins – freshman (6'4" 290); 64 Brandt Rice – (redshirt) freshman (6'5" 284); 65 Nathan Gelger – (redshirt) freshman (6'5" 265); 66 Alex Haswell – freshman (6'5" 230); 69 Abraham Bangoura – freshman (6'5" 290); 70 Rex Johnson – sophomore (6'5" 300); 71 Jake Davies – (redshirt) freshman (6'7" 286); 72 Caden Barnett – junior (6'5" 310); 73 Caleb Hall – freshman (6'5" 255); 74 Brycen Lotz – freshman (6'4" 270); 75 Alex Conn – junior (6'5" 310); 76 Quinn Grovesteen-Matchey – freshman (6'6" 301); 77 Nofoafia Tulafono – senior (6'2" 324); 78 Wes King – sophomore (6'5" 303); 79 Jack Walsh – junior (6'3" 313); Defensive Line: 34 Braden Siders – junior (6'3" 246); 39 Elltoum Murgus – freshman (6'3" 200); 40 Tyce Westland – junior (6'5" 239); 54 Sabastian Harsh – junior (6'3" 242); 55 Kevin Sjogren – sophomore (6'5" 240); 58 Jordan Turbull – (redshirt) freshman (6'5" 228); 59 Ethan Day – sophomore (6'4" 254); 68 Cody Crawford – (redshirt) freshman (6'1" 285); 88 Tell Wade – (redshirt) freshman (6'3" 249); 91 Jaden Williams – sophomore (6'4" 286); 92 Dante Drake – sophomore (6'3" 261); 93 DeVonne Harris – senior (6'4" 240); 94 Ben Florentine – junior (6'1" 276); 95 Caleb Robinson – senior (6'2" 286); 96 Jordan Bertagnole – senior (6'4" 290); 97 Lucas Samsula – (redshirt) freshman (6'4" 285); 98 Jayden Williams – (redshirt) freshman (6'3" 285); 99 Nathan Murphy – freshman (6'3" 265); Place-Kickers: 46 John Hoyland – senior (5'10" 196); 47 Erik Sandvik – (redshirt) freshman (6'1" 190); 99 Keelan Anderson – freshman (5'10", 166); Punters: 41 Jack Culbreath – graduate (6'4" 235); 43 Gavyn Helm – freshman (6'3", 210); Long Snapper: 52 Carson York – junior (6'1" 207)	Linebacker: 22 Evan Eller – senior (6'0" 228); 25 Cole DeMarzo – junior (6'4" 239); 26 Gary Rutherford – freshman (6'1" 200); 28 Adrian Onylego – freshman (6'3" 208); 33 Connor Shay – senior (6'2" 232); 43 Shae Suiaunoa – senior (6'3" 232); 44 Micah Young – junior (6'2" 209); 45 Read Sunn – junior (6'2" 231); 46 Dash Bauman – freshman (6'2" 200); 49 Nic Talich – junior (6'0" 215); 51 Jack Harvey – freshman (6'1" 205); Defensive Back: 2 Wrook Brown – junior (5'11" 184); 3 Andrew Johnson – junior (6'1" 196); 4 Keany Parks – sophomore (6'1" 168); 7 Markle Grant – freshman (5'11" 179); 8 Tyrese Boss – freshman (5'11" 170); 11 Charles Williams – freshman (6'0" 175); 12 Tyrecus Davis – senior (5'10" 186); 13 Ian Bell – sophomore (6'1" 186); 14 Naz Hill – (redshirt) freshman (6'3" 175); 15 David Leonard – freshman (5'11" 170); 16 Bleyne Bryant – freshman (6'1" 191); 18 Caleb Merritt – sophomore (5'11" 187); 19 Malique Singleton – sophomore (6'0" 190); 20 LaFai Purcell – (redshirt) freshman (5'11" 182); 21 Koa McIntyre – sophomore (6'0" 206); 23 Jones Thomas – (redshirt) freshman (6'2" 195); 24 Drew Jackson – freshman (5'11" 160); 27 Joaquin Sandoval – freshman (5'10" 175); 29 Isaac Sell – junior (5'10" 192); 30 Miles Tucker – (redshirt) freshman (6'0" 191); 31 Wyett Ekeler – senior (5'11" 200); 32 Jevon Davis – junior (6'0" 208); 35 Nikos Varelas – (redshirt) freshman (5'10" 191); 42 Isaac White – senior (6'1" 201)

=== Departures ===
2024 Wyoming offseason departures
Name	Position	Notes
Ayir Asante	WR	Declared for 2024 NFL draft
Chauncey Carter	CB	Transferred to Midwestern State
Buck Coors	DB	Medically Retired
Keelan Cox	DE	Transferred to Texas Southern
Frank Crum	OL	Graduated/Declared for 2024 NFL draft
Josh Dixon	DB	Entered Transfer Portal
Jaxon Galica	DL	Entered Transfer Portal
Gunner Gentry	WR	Graduated
Easton Gibbs	LB	Graduated/Declared for 2024 NFL draft
Cole Godbout	DL	Graduated/Declared for 2024 NFL draft
Cayden Hawkins	LB	Transferred to Louisiana Tech
Jakorey Hawkins	CB	Graduated/Declared for 2024 NFL draft
Jeremy Hollingsworth	RB	Graduated
Brady Hultman	LB	Transferred to Missouri
Tyler Jacklich	RB	Entered Transfer Portal
DQ James	RB	Entered Transfer Portal
Chase Locke	WR	Transferred to Louisiana Tech
Ryan Marquez	WR	Graduated
Carson May	QB	Transferred to Abilene Christian
Garrett McGriff	S	Transferred to Minot State
Gavin Meyer	NT	Graduated
Andrew Peasley	QB	Graduated/Declared for 2024 NFL draft
Colin O'Brian	TE	Graduated/Declared for 2024 NFL draft
Forrest Scheel	OL	Transferred to Iowa Central CC
Clayton Stewart	P	Graduated
Kolbey Taylor	CB	Transferred to Vanderbilt
Kuba Tyszka	DL	Transferred to North Dakota
Treyton Welch	TE	Declared for 2024 NFL draft
Wyatt Wieland	WR	Graduated

=== Additions ===
==== Incoming transfers ====
Name	Position	Eligibility Remaining	Previous School
Jaylan Bean (PWO)	WR	3 years	Garden City CC
Alex Conn	OL	2 years	Iowa Western CC
Jack Culbreath	P	1 year	VMI
Evan Eller	LB	1 year	VMI
Tyler Hampton	TE	3 years	Golden West College
DJ Jones	RB	1 year	North Carolina
Ty King	WR	3 years	Texas Tech
Garrett McGriff (PWO)	S	4 years	Army
Clay Nanke (PWO)	TE	2 years	Colorado State

==== Recruiting ====
Wyoming signed a high school class of 20 scholarship athletes and 10 walk-ons.

===== Scholarship recruits =====
College recruiting (2024)
Name	Hometown	School	Height	Weight	Commit date
Deyon Batiste; QB	Houston, TX	Cypress Park HS	6 ft 5 in (1.96 m)	230 lb (100 kg)	Dec 20, 2023
Deyon Batiste; QB	Recruit ratings: Rivals: 247Sports: ESPN:				
Dash Bauman; LB	Lincoln, NE	Lincoln East HS	6 ft 2 in (1.88 m)	200 lb (91 kg)	Aug 8, 2023
Dash Bauman; LB	Recruit ratings: Rivals: 247Sports: ESPN:				
Tyrese Boss; CB	Chino Hills, CA	Chino Hills HS	5 ft 11 in (1.80 m)	170 lb (77 kg)	Dec 20, 2023
Tyrese Boss; CB	Recruit ratings: Rivals: 247Sports:				
Bleyne Bryant; S	Bowling Green, MO	Bowling Green HS	6 ft 1 in (1.85 m)	191 lb (87 kg)	Jul 18, 2023
Bleyne Bryant; S	Recruit ratings: Rivals: 247Sports: ESPN:				
Garrett Combs; DT	Belton, TX	Lake Belton HS	6 ft 3 in (1.91 m)	270 lb (120 kg)	Nov 2, 2023
Garrett Combs; DT	Recruit ratings: Rivals: 247Sports: ESPN:				
Chris Durr Jr. WR	Chicago, IL	Morgan Park HS	5 ft 10 in (1.78 m)	155 lb (70 kg)	Dec 18, 2023
Chris Durr Jr. WR	Recruit ratings: Rivals: 247Sports:				
Markie Grant; CB	Houston, TX	Dekaney HS	5 ft 11 in (1.80 m)	170 lb (77 kg)	Feb 1, 2024
Markie Grant; CB	Recruit ratings: 247Sports:				
Nico Hamilton; RB	Austin, TX	Lake Travis HS	5 ft 10 in (1.78 m)	200 lb (91 kg)	Feb 5, 2024
Nico Hamilton; RB	Recruit ratings: 247Sports:				
Alex Haswell; ATH	Sheridan, WY	Sheridan HS	6 ft 5 in (1.96 m)	230 lb (100 kg)	Nov 21, 2023
Alex Haswell; ATH	Recruit ratings: Rivals:				
Braylon Jenkins; OL	West Des Moines, IA	Valley HS	6 ft 4 in (1.93 m)	290 lb (130 kg)	Nov 2, 2023
Braylon Jenkins; OL	Recruit ratings: Rivals: 247Sports:				
Hunter Kallstrom; TE	Kerkhoven, MN	Kerkhoven-Murdock-Sunberg HS	6 ft 4 in (1.93 m)	225 lb (102 kg)	Aug 7, 2023
Hunter Kallstrom; TE	Recruit ratings: Rivals: 247Sports:				
David Leonard; S	St. Louis, MO	St. Mary's HS	5 ft 11 in (1.80 m)	170 lb (77 kg)	Jan 31, 2024
David Leonard; S	Recruit ratings: No ratings found				
Brycen Lotz; OL	Braham, MN	Braham Area HS	6 ft 4 in (1.93 m)	270 lb (120 kg)	Jun 24, 2023
Brycen Lotz; OL	Recruit ratings: Rivals: 247Sports:				
Eltoum Murgus; DE	Kansas City, MO	North Kansas City HS	6 ft 3 in (1.91 m)	200 lb (91 kg)	Dec 20, 2023
Eltoum Murgus; DE	Recruit ratings: Rivals: 247Sports: ESPN:				
Nathan Murphy; DT	Bryan, TX	Bryan HS	6 ft 3 in (1.91 m)	265 lb (120 kg)	Dec 20, 2023
Nathan Murphy; DT	Recruit ratings: Rivals: 247Sports:				
Adrian Onyiego; LB	Rogers, MN	Rogers HS	6 ft 3 in (1.91 m)	200 lb (91 kg)	Jun 24, 2023
Adrian Onyiego; LB	Recruit ratings: Rivals: 247Sports:				
Giovanni Panozzo; OL	Arvada, CO	Arvada West HS	6 ft 5 in (1.96 m)	265 lb (120 kg)	Jun 26, 2023
Giovanni Panozzo; OL	Recruit ratings: Rivals: 247Sports:				
Gary Rutherford; LB	Peoria, IL	Peoria HS	6 ft 1 in (1.85 m)	200 lb (91 kg)	Dec 20, 2023
Gary Rutherford; LB	Recruit ratings: Rivals: 247Sports:				
Charles Williams; CB	Sausalito, CA	Marin Catholic HS	6 ft 0 in (1.83 m)	175 lb (79 kg)	Dec 20, 2023
Charles Williams; CB	Recruit ratings: 247Sports: ESPN:				
Jake Wilson; TE	Montgomery, TX	Montgomery HS	6 ft 5 in (1.96 m)	220 lb (100 kg)	Oct 14, 2023
Jake Wilson; TE	Recruit ratings: Rivals: 247Sports:				
Overall recruit ranking: Rivals: N/A 247Sports: 103 ESPN: N/A
Note: In many cases, Scout, Rivals, 247Sports, On3, and ESPN may conflict in their listings of height and weight.; In these cases, the average was taken. ESPN grades are on a 100-point scale.; Sources: "Rivals commits". Rivals.; "ESPN commits". ESPN.; "2024 Team Ranking". Rivals.com.; "247Sports commits". 247Sports.

===== Walk-on recruits =====
College recruiting (2024)
Name	Hometown	School	Height	Weight	Commit date
Keelan Anderson; PK	Cheyenne, WY	Cheyenne South HS	5 ft 10 in (1.78 m)	155 lb (70 kg)	Dec 20, 2023
Keelan Anderson; PK	Recruit ratings: No ratings found				
Dontae Burch; RB	Kansas City, MO	Christ Preparatory Academy	5 ft 7 in (1.70 m)	177 lb (80 kg)	Dec 20, 2023
Dontae Burch; RB	Recruit ratings: No ratings found				
Caleb Hall; OL	Carmichael, CA	Jesuit HS	6 ft 5 in (1.96 m)	255 lb (116 kg)	Feb 7, 2024
Caleb Hall; OL	Recruit ratings: 247Sports:				
Jack Harvey; LB	Baldwin City, KS	Baldwin HS	6 ft 1 in (1.85 m)	205 lb (93 kg)	Dec 20, 2023
Jack Harvey; LB	Recruit ratings: No ratings found				
Drew Jackson; DB	Cheyenne, WY	Cheyenne East HS	5 ft 11 in (1.80 m)	160 lb (73 kg)	Dec 20, 2023
Drew Jackson; DB	Recruit ratings: No ratings found				
Tyler Nystrom; WR	Arden Hills, MN	Mounds View HS	6 ft 2 in (1.88 m)	180 lb (82 kg)	Dec 20, 2023
Tyler Nystrom; WR	Recruit ratings: 247Sports:				
Trey Olsen; WR	Loveland, CO	Loveland HS	6 ft 1 in (1.85 m)	185 lb (84 kg)	Dec 20, 2023
Trey Olsen; WR	Recruit ratings: No ratings found				
Spencer Rathbun; OL	Denver, CO	Rock Canyon HS	6 ft 4 in (1.93 m)	260 lb (120 kg)	Feb 7, 2024
Spencer Rathbun; OL	Recruit ratings: No ratings found				
Joaquin Sandoval; DB	Glenwood Springs, CO	Glenwood Springs HS	5 ft 10 in (1.78 m)	175 lb (79 kg)	Dec 20, 2023
Joaquin Sandoval; DB	Recruit ratings: No ratings found				
Tegen Seeds; OL	Douglas, WY	Douglas HS	6 ft 0 in (1.83 m)	298 lb (135 kg)	Dec 20, 2023
Tegen Seeds; OL	Recruit ratings: No ratings found				
Overall recruit ranking:
Note: In many cases, Scout, Rivals, 247Sports, On3, and ESPN may conflict in their listings of height and weight.; In these cases, the average was taken. ESPN grades are on a 100-point scale.; Sources: "2024 Team Ranking". Rivals.com.

== Statistics ==
=== Team ===
	Wyoming	Opp
Scoring	232	340
Points per game	19.3	28.3
First downs	208	239
Rushing	86	104
Passing	97	117
Penalty	25	18
Rushing yards	1654	2300
Avg per play	3.6	5.5
Avg per game	137.8	191.7
Rushing touchdowns	14	21
Passing yards	2273	2627
Att-Comp-Int	347-181-11	342-211-6
Avg per pass	6.6	7.7
Avg per catch	12.6	12.5
Avg per game	189.4	218.9
Passing touchdowns	11	16
Total offense	3927	4927
Avg per play	4.9	6.5
Avg per game	327.3	410.6
Fumbles-Lost	18-5	12-5
Penalties-Yards	66-598	85-706
Avg per game	49.8	58.8

	Wyoming	Opp
Punts-Yards	66-2665	55-2403
Avg per punt	40.4	43.7
Time of possession/Game	30:52	29:08
3rd down conversions	66-181	37-143
4th down conversions	15-25	11-22
Touchdowns scored	27	41
Field goals-Attempts	15-19	18-24
PAT-Attempts	25-25	38-38

=== Individual ===
==== Passing ====
Passing statistics
#	NAME	GP	RAT	CMP	ATT	YDS	AVG/G	CMP%	TD	INT	LONG
17	Evan Svoboda	12	98.3	111	226	1318	109.8	49.1%	5	8	70
12	Kaden Anderson	9	136.7	70	120	955	106.1	58.3%	6	3	68
	TOTALS	12	111.3	181	347	2273	189.4	52.2%	11	11	70

==== Rushing ====
Rushing statistics
#	NAME	GP	ATT	GAIN	AVG	TD	LONG	AVG/G
22	Sam Scott	10	92	435	4.7	3	43	43.5
4	Harrison Waylee	4	63	323	5.1	1	36	80.8
6	Jamari Ferrell	12	80	318	4.0	1	62	26.5
17	Evan Svoboda	12	109	237	2.2	5	51	19.8
16	DJ Jones	4	57	162	2.8	0	17	40.5
5	Tyler King	10	13	100	7.7	2	54	10.0
12	Kaden Anderson	9	22	49	2.2	2	24	5.4
11	Justin Stevenson	12	5	40	8.0	0	16	3.3
98	Jayden Williams	12	1	17	17.0	0	17	1.4
3	Dawaiian McNeely	2	2	12	6.0	0	8	6.0
83	Will Pelissier	12	1	3	3.0	0	3	0.3
15	Chris Durr	12	1	3	3.0	0	3	0.3
2	Devin Boddie	4	1	2	2.0	0	2	0.5
89	Jake Wilson	4	1	-1	-1.0	0	0	-0.3
	Team	12	12	-46	-3.8	0	0	-3.8
	TOTALS	12	460	1654	3.6	14	62	137.8

==== Receiving ====
Receiving statistics
#	NAME	GP	CTH	YDS	AVG	TD	LONG	AVG/G
15	Chris Durr	12	31	348	11.2	1	40	29.0
84	John Michael Gyllenborg	9	30	425	14.2	3	63	47.2
8	Jaylen Sargent	12	23	480	20.9	2	70	40.0
5	Tyler King	10	17	236	13.9	0	36	23.6
11	Justin Stevenson	12	17	204	12.0	3	63	17.0
83	Will Pelissier	12	14	212	15.1	0	41	17.7
22	Sam Scott	10	12	74	6.2	1	41	7.4
86	Nick Miles	12	9	60	6.7	0	25	5.0
6	Jamari Ferrell	12	8	44	5.5	0	17	3.7
2	Devin Boddie	4	5	62	12.4	1	20	15.5
16	DJ Jones	4	4	24	6.0	0	11	6.0
85	Clay Nanke	12	4	64	16.0	0	32	5.3
9	Alex Brown	8	2	21	10.5	0	15	2.6
4	Harrison Waylee	4	2	5	2.5	0	3	1.3
87	Isaac Schoenfeld	12	1	7	7.0	0	7	0.6
33	Trey Olsen	1	1	4	4.0	0	4	4.0
51	Jack Harvey	1	1	3	3.0	0	3	3.0
	TOTALS	12	181	2273	12.6	11	70	189.4

==== Defense ====
Defense statistics
#	NAME	GP	SOLO	AST	TOT	TFL-YDS	SACK-YDS	INT	BU	QBH	FR	FF	BLK	SAF	TD
43	Shae Suiaunoa	12	47	41	88	10.0-30	1.0-10	0	2	3	0	0	0	0	0
33	Connor Shay	12	45	31	76	7.5-24	1.5-10	1	3	2	0	0	0	0	0
42	Isaac White	9	38	19	57	1.5-4	0-0	0	2	0	0	0	0	0	0
2	Wrook Brown	12	36	12	48	1.0-7	0-0	3	6	0	0	0	0	0	1
31	Wyett Ekeler	9	28	18	46	1.0-5	0-0	1	1	0	0	0	0	0	0
12	Tyrecus Davis	12	36	6	42	1.0-0	0-0	1	8	0	0	0	1	0	0
40	Tyce Westland	11	18	23	41	6.0-22	3.0-17	0	0	1	1	1	0	0	0
4	Keany Parks	11	34	7	41	0.5-1	0-0	0	7	0	1	0	0	0	0
54	Sabastian Harsh	8	25	15	40	8.5-30	1.5-10	0	0	1	0	0	0	0	0
3	Andrew Johnson	11	19	11	30	0-0	0-0	0	1	1	0	0	0	0	0
98	Jayden Williams	12	14	14	28	1.5-1	0-0	0	0	0	0	0	0	0	0
96	Jordan Bertagnole	11	10	15	25	2.0-8	0.5-4	0	1	3	0	1	0	0	0
94	Ben Florentine	11	10	15	25	3.0-11	1.0-4	0	1	1	0	0	0	0	0
34	Braden Siders	7	12	10	22	5.5-34	3.5-28	0	1	1	0	0	0	0	0
93	DeVonne Harris	8	15	6	21	4.5-20	2.0-9	0	0	0	1	0	0	0	0
91	Jaden Williams	12	6	14	20	1.5-9	0.5-1	0	0	3	0	0	0	0	0
59	Ethan Day	12	9	10	19	1.0-1	0.5-1	0	0	0	1	1	0	0	0
17	Malique Singleton	11	9	2	11	0-0	0-0	0	0	0	0	0	0	0	0
80	Justin Erb	12	6	2	8	0-0	0-0	0	0	0	0	0	0	0	0
92	Dante Drake	11	5	3	8	3.5-13	0-0	0	0	0	0	0	0	0	0
13	Ian Bell	12	5	1	6	0-0	0-0	0	1	0	0	0	0	0	0
45	Read Sunn	12	4	1	5	0-0	0-0	0	0	0	0	1	0	0	0
49	Nic Talich	12	3	1	4	0-0	0-0	0	0	0	0	0	0	0	0
23	Jones Thomas	9	4	0	4	0-0	0-0	0	0	0	0	0	0	0	0
44	Micah Young	12	1	2	3	0-0	0-0	0	0	0	0	0	0	0	0
36	Caleb Driskill	9	1	1	2	0-0	0-0	0	0	0	0	0	0	0	0
86	Nick Miles	12	1	1	2	0-0	0-0	0	0	0	0	0	0	0	0
83	Will Pelissier	12	2	0	2	0-0	0-0	0	0	0	0	0	0	0	0
6	Evan Eller	4	1	1	2	0-0	0-0	0	0	0	0	0	0	0	0
18	Caleb Merritt	12	2	0	2	0-0	0-0	0	0	0	0	0	0	0	0
52	Carson York	12	2	0	2	0-0	0-0	0	0	0	1	0	0	0	0
46	John Hoyland	12	1	0	1	0-0	0-0	0	0	0	0	0	0	0	0
4	Harrison Waylee	4	1	0	1	0-0	0-0	0	0	0	0	0	0	0	0
17	Evan Svoboda	12	1	0	1	0-0	0-0	0	0	0	0	0	0	0	0
29	Isaac Sell	12	1	0	1	0-0	0-0	0	0	0	0	0	0	0	0
87	Isaac Schoenfeld	12	1	0	1	0-0	0-0	0	0	0	0	0	0	0	0
14	Naz Hill	1	1	0	1	0-0	0-0	0	0	0	0	0	0	0	0
7	Markie Grant	4	1	0	1	0-0	0-0	0	0	0	0	0	0	0	0
26	Gary Rutherford	4	0	1	1	0-0	0-0	0	0	0	0	0	0	0	0
	TOTALS	12	457	288	745	61-223	15-94	6	34	16	5	5	1	0	1

Key: POS: Position, SOLO: Solo Tackles, AST: Assisted Tackles, TOT: Total Tackles, TFL: Tackles-for-loss, SACK: Quarterback Sacks, INT: Interceptions, BU: Passes Broken Up, PD: Passes Defended, QBH: Quarterback Hits, FR: Fumbles Recovered, FF: Forced Fumbles, BLK: Kicks or Punts Blocked, SAF: Safeties, TD : Touchdown

==== Special teams ====
Kicking statistics
#	NAME	GP	XPM	XPA	XP%	FGM	FGA	FG%	1–19	20–29	30–39	40–49	50+	LNG
46	John Hoyland	12	25	25	100.0%	15	19	78.9%	0-0	5-5	3-3	6-7	1-4	54

Kickoff statistics
#	NAME	GP	KICKS	YDS	AVG	TB	OB
46	John Hoyland	12	52	3313	63.7	31	0

Punting statistics
#	NAME	GP	PUNTS	YDS	AVG	LONG	TB	I–20	50+	BLK
41	Jack Culbreath	12	66	2665	40.4	62	2	22	9	0

Kick return statistics
#	NAME	GP	RTNS	YDS	AVG	TD	LNG
5	Tyler King	10	15	422	28.1	1	100
87	Isaac Schoenfeld	12	2	18	9.0	0	11
4	Keany Parks	12	2	75	37.5	0	54
85	Clay Nanke	12	1	3	3.0	0	3
18	Caleb Merritt	12	1	14	14.0	|14	
	TOTALS	12	21	532	25.3	1	100

Punt return statistics
#	NAME	GP	RTNS	YDS	AVG	TD	LONG
19	Caleb Cooley	8	6	30	5.0	0	15
5	Tyler King	10	3	-1	-0.3	0	0
	TOTALS	12	9	29	3.2	0	15
