= Evan Svoboda =

American football player (born 2003)

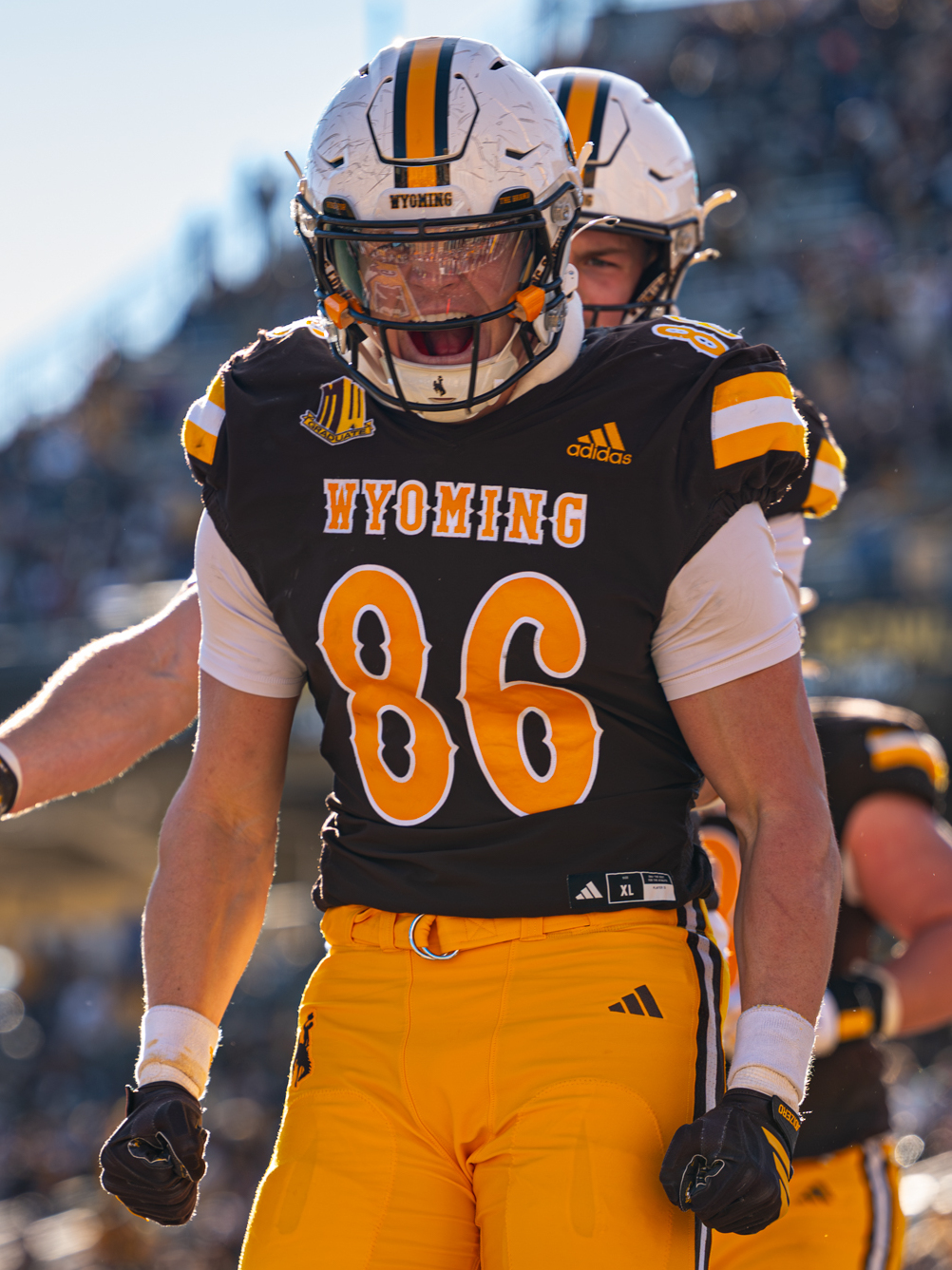
- Svoboda with Wyoming in 2025

Profile
- Position: Tight end

Personal information
- Born: March 31, 2003 (age 23); Mesa, Arizona, U.S.
- Listed height: 6 ft 5 in (1.96 m)
- Listed weight: 248 lb (112 kg)

Career information
- High school: Red Mountain (Mesa, Arizona)
- College: Snow (2021); Wyoming (2022–2025)
- NFL draft: 2026: undrafted

Career history
- Los Angeles Chargers (2026)*
- * Offseason or practice squad member only
- Stats at Pro Football Reference

Evan Robert Svoboda (born March 31, 2003) is an American professional football tight end. He played college football for the Wyoming Cowboys and Snow College.

== Early life ==
Svoboda attended Red Mountain High School in Mesa, Arizona. He played basketball and football in high school. As a senior in 2020, he played in seven games in a shortened season caused by the COVID-19 pandemic, passing for 1,286 and 13 touchdowns.

== College career ==
Svoboda attended Snow College for one season in 2021 as a backup, before transferring to the University of Wyoming. After not appearing in a game his first season at Wyoming in 2022, he played in 10 games with one start in 2023. After an injury to starter Andrew Peasley on the final drive of 2023 Arizona Bowl, Svoboda entered the game and helped lead the Cowboys to set up a game-winning field goal. Overall, he finished the season completing 23 of 38 passes for 200 yards with an interception and rushed for 80 yards with two touchdowns. Svoboda took over as the starting quarterback in 2024. After struggling at quarterback in the 2024 season, Svoboda moved to tight end for the 2025 season.

=== Statistics ===
Season	Team	Games			Passing								Rushing				Receiving			
Season	Team	GP	GS	Record (Note: Accounts for only GS as a QB. In 2025 Svoboda started multiple at TE.)	Cmp	Att	Pct	Yds	Y/A	TD	Int	Rtg	Att	Yds	Avg	TD	Rec	Yds	Avg	TD
2021	Snow	4	0	—	6	12	50	28	4.7	0	1	52.9	12	29	2.4	0	0	0	–	0
2022	Wyoming	0	0	—	Redshirt															
2023	Wyoming	10	1	0–1	23	38	60.5	200	5.3	0	1	99.5	25	80	3.2	2	0	0	–	0
2024	Wyoming	12	9	2–7	111	226	49.1	1,318	5.8	5	8	98.3	109	237	2.2	5	0	0	–	0
2025	Wyoming	12	7	—	0	1	0	0	0	0	1	-200.0	5	12	2.4	0	11	92	8.4	1
NCAA career		34	17	2–8	134	265	50.6	1,518	5.7	5	10	97.4	139	329	2.4	7	11	92	8.4	1
College career		38	17	2–8	140	277	50.5	1,546	5.6	5	11	95.4	151	358	2.4	7	11	92	8.4	1

== Professional career ==
Pre-draft measurables
Height	Weight	Arm length	Hand span	Wingspan	40-yard dash	10-yard split	20-yard split	20-yard shuttle	Three-cone drill	Vertical jump	Broad jump
6 ft 5 in (1.96 m)	248 lb (112 kg)	32 7/8 in (0.84 m)	9 3/8 in (0.24 m)	6 ft 6 1/4 in (1.99 m)	4.62 s	1.60 s	2.70 s	4.22 s	6.90 s	36.0 in (0.91 m)	10 ft 2 in (3.10 m)
All values from Pro Day

After going undrafted in the 2026 NFL draft, Svoboda signed with the Los Angeles Chargers as an undrafted free agent. Svoboda was waived by the Chargers as a part of final roster cuts on August 30, 2026; he was re-signed to the team's practice squad the following day. On November 10, he was released.
