= Caden Dowler =

American football player (born 2003)

No. 5 – Montana State Bobcats
- Position: Defensive back
- Class: Redshirt Junior

Personal information
- Born: June 28, 2003 (age 23)
- Listed height: 6 ft 0 in (1.83 m)
- Listed weight: 205 lb (93 kg)

Career information
- High school: Billings West (Billings, Montana)
- College: Montana State (2022–present)

Awards and highlights
- FCS national champion (2025); FCS First-team All-American (2025); Big Sky Defensive Player of the Year (2025); First-team All-Big Sky (2025)
- Stats at ESPN

Caden Andrew Dowler (born June 28, 2003) is an American college football defensive back for the Montana State Bobcats.

== Early life ==
Caden Andrew Dowler was born in 2003 to Justin and Michelle Dowler, along with his twin brother, McLean "Taco" Dowler. Caden is older by one minute. At age two, the twins were nicknamed "Burrito" and "Taco", though Caden's nickname only stuck "for like six months" while his brother's nickname carried on into adulthood: "I couldn't stand when people called me that, so I switched back, and, you know, he just kept it." According to Michelle, the twins "played like every single sport from the beginning of time."

In his first season of youth football, Dowler was made a lineman because the coaches thought he was too slow. He did not like football at first and played American Legion Baseball for the Billings Scarlets, but he was convinced by his brother to play high school football.

== High school career ==
Dowler attended Billings West High School in Billings, Montana, where he earned nine varsity letters in football, basketball, and track and field. He played quarterback as a freshman and cornerback as a sophomore. Dowler then spent his final two years as a safety, wide receiver, long snapper and returner, helping the Golden Bears reach back-to-back Class AA state title games alongside his brother Taco. As a senior in 2021, he recorded 848 all-purpose yards and 10 total touchdowns, along with 50 tackles, seven pass breakups, and three interceptions. Dowler was a first-team all-state honoree at safety and a second-team all-state honoree at wide receiver, as well as a first-team all-conference selection at both positions. He was also selected to play in the 75th Montana East-West Shrine Game.

=== Recruiting ===
Dowler was rated as a three-star recruit and the second-best player in the state of Montana in the class of 2022, according to 247Sports, with Taco ranked as the third-best. The brothers were both offered by Montana State University (MSU) after Billings West's state playoff semifinal win in 2020. They later visited MSU for the Bobcats' Gold Rush game in 2021 against Drake, with each saying the trip "sealed the deal" for them. Dowler verbally committed to playing college football at MSU on September 13, 2021, choosing to stay in his home state after also having received offers from Navy and Northern Colorado; Taco committed to MSU the same day.

== College career ==
=== Injury struggles: 2022–2024 ===
After suffering a preseason injury, Dowler began his freshman year in 2022 as the fourth-string safety on the depth chart. He recorded four tackles in eight games played, mainly in a special teams role. In 2023, Dowler underwent an intense offseason competition with senior Level Price, Jr. for the starting nickelback job following the graduation of Ty Okada. The two were named co-starters at the position ahead of the team's season opener against Utah Tech. Dowler recorded his first career interception in the subsequent 63–20 win over the Trailblazers. However, he suffered a leg injury in their next game against South Dakota State, which he then re-aggravated in practice, causing him to be ruled out for the rest of the season. The injury was later confirmed to be an ACL tear; Dowler finished with five tackles and one interception and received a redshirt for the 2023 season. He was then moved to free safety ahead of the 2024 season due to injuries at the position. Dowler started the first six games of the year at free safety and nickelback before suffering another ACL tear. He finished the season with 12 tackles and one tackle for loss, and the Bobcats reached the FCS national championship game.

=== Breakout season: 2025 ===
Dowler was elected a team captain by his teammates ahead of the 2025 season, entering the campaign as the starting strong safety. He was also the only defensive back on the roster with any previous starting experience. MSU defensive coordinator Shawn Howe praised Dowler's leadership and communication skills, saying that having him on the team was "almost like having another hand on the coaching staff". He posted a team-high 10 tackles in their season-opening loss to AP No. 7 Oregon. Two weeks later, Dowler recorded his first career sack in a win over San Diego. In November, he earned Big Sky defensive player of the week honors after tallying seven tackles, an interception, a forced fumble, and a pass breakup in a victory over Weber State. Dowler was described by MSU head coach Brent Vigen as the "quarterback of the defense" after the game. He repeated as Big Sky defensive player of the week the following week after he intercepted two passes, one of which he returned for 83 yards for a touchdown, to go with a forced fumble, a pass breakup, and a team-high 12 tackles in a win over UC Davis. The following week, Dowler returned another interception for a touchdown in a 31–28 comeback win over Montana in the Brawl of the Wild, which clinched the Big Sky title for MSU; the play was described by 406 MT Sports as the "signature moment of [his] comeback campaign". He became the first Bobcat to win a weekly conference award in three consecutive weeks, and was also named the Stats Perform FCS national defensive player of the week.

Dowler recorded an interception in back-to-back wins over Yale and Stephen F. Austin to open the FCS playoffs, marking his sixth interception in five games. However, he suffered a wrist injury during MSU's semifinal win over Montana while tackling Grizzlies running back Eli Gillman, and did not return to the game. Despite Dowler re-aggravating his injury in the FCS national championship game, the Bobcats went on to defeat Illinois State, 35–34, in overtime, marking the program's first national title since 1984. He finished the season with 91 total tackles (6.5 tackles for loss), six interceptions, four pass breakups, two forced fumbles and a sack. Dowler was named the Big Sky Defensive Player of the Year, and was selected as a first-team FCS All-American by numerous publications. He was also announced as a finalist for the Buck Buchanan Award.
