= 2025 FCS All-America college football team =

College football honors

The 2025 FCS College Football All-America Team includes those players of American college football who have been honored by various selector organizations as the best players at their respective positions, in the Football Championship Subdivision (FCS). The selector organizations award the "All-America" honor annually following the conclusion of the fall college football season.

The 2025 FCS College Football All-America Team is composed of the following College Football All-American first teams chosen by the following selector organizations: Associated Press (AP), American Football Coaches Association (AFCA), Stats Perform (STATS), Phil Steele, Sports Illustrated (SI) and Walter Camp Football Foundation (WCFF).

Currently, the NCAA does not recognizes any organization as an official selector for the FCS College Football All-America Team, so no player can be selected as a consensus selection, let alone a unanimous All-American.

== Offense ==
=== Quarterback ===
- Beau Brungard, Youngstown State (AP, AFCA, Phil Steele, SI, STATS, WCFF)
- Cole Payton, North Dakota State, (SI, STATS AP-2)
- Taron Dickens, Western Carolina (STATS)

=== Running back ===
- Joshua Dye, Southern Utah (AP, AFCA, Phil Steele, SI, STATS, WCFF)
- Eli Gillman, Montana (Phil Steele, SI, WCFF, AP-2)
- L. J. Phillips, South Dakota (AFCA, SI, WCFF, AP-2)
- Rodney Nelson, Monmouth (AP, STATS)

=== Wide receiver ===
- Bryce Lance, North Dakota State (AP, AFCA, Phil Steele, SI, STATS)
- Josh Derry, Monmouth (AP, Phil Steele, SI, WCFF)
- Jared Richardson, Penn (AFCA, Phil Steele, SI, AP-2)
- Marquis Buchanan, Rhode Island (AP, SI, STATS)
- Nico Brown, Yale (AFCA, WCFF)
- Jalen Jones, Alabama State (AP-2)
- Daniel Sobkowicz, Illinois State (AP-2)

=== Tight end ===
- Chris Corbo, Dartmouth (AP, AFCA, Phil Steele, SI, STATS, WCFF)
- Connor Hulstein, Marist (AP-2)
- Ryder Kurtz, Cornell (AP, Phil Steele, SI, STATS)

=== Offensive linemen ===
- Titan Fleischmann, Montana State (AP, Phil Steele, SI, STATS, WCFF)
- Trent Fraley, North Dakota State (AP, AFCA, Phil Steele, SI, STATS)
- Seth Anderson, North Dakota (Phil Steele, SI, STATS, AP-2)
- JT Cornelius, Monmouth (SI, STATS, WCFF)
- Griffin Empey, North Dakota State (AP, Phil Steele)
- Delby Lemieux, Dartmouth (AP, SI)
- Stryker Rashid, Idaho State (Phil Steele, AP-2)
- Hunter Smith, Tarleton State (WCFF, AP-2)
- Logan Weedman, Tennessee Tech (AFCA, STATS)
- Temi Ajirotutu, Villanova (AFCA)
- Mike Bartilucci, The Citadel (AFCA)
- Quinten Christensen, South Dakota State (AP)
- Netinho Oliveiri, Penn (WCFF)
- Jake Pope, Illinois State (SI)
- Joshua Sales Jr., Austin Peay (STATS)
- Roger Smith, South Carolina State (AFCA)
- Beau Johnson, North Dakota State (AP-2)
- Langston Jones, Lehigh (AP-2)

== Defense ==
=== Defensive linemen ===
- Lando Brown, Southern Utah (AP, AFCA, Phil Steele, SI, STATS, WCFF)
- Joshua Stoneking, Furman (AP, AFCA, Phil Steele, SI, STATS, WCFF)
- Andrew Zock, Mercer (AP, Phil Steele, SI, STATS, WCFF)
- Kaleb Proctor, Southeastern Louisiana (AFCA, Phil Steele, SI, STATS, AP-2)
- Keyshawn Johnson, UT Martin (AP, AFCA, SI)
- Kahmari Brown, Elon (WCFF, AP-2)
- David Hoage, West Georgia (SI, AP-2)
- Jacob Psyk, UC Davis (STATS, AP-2)
- Paul Brott, Montana State (AP-2)
- Quincy Ivory, Jackson State (AP-2)
- Lance Rucker, North Dakota (AP-2)

=== Linebacker ===
- Tye Niekamp, Illinois State (AP, AFCA, Phil Steele, SI, STATS, WCFF)
- A.J. Pena, Rhode Island (AP, Phil Steele, SI, STATS, WCFF)
- James Conway, Fordham (AP, AFCA, Phil Steele, SI, STATS)
- Jaydon Southard, Stephen F. Austin (SI, STATS)
- Logan Kopp, North Dakota State (AFCA, AP-2)
- Tyler Ochojski, Lehigh (WCFF, AP-2)
- Luke Banbury, William & Mary (STATS)
- Caden Dowler, Montana State (WCFF)
- Theron Gaines, Tennessee Tech (SI)
- Keyshawn Johnson, UT Martin (Phil Steele)
- Mikey D’Amato, Cal Poly (AP-2)

=== Defensive backs ===
- Charles Demmings, Stephen F. Austin (AFCA, Phil Steele, SI, STATS)
- Caden Dowler, Montana State (AP, AFCA, SI, STATS)
- Maximus Pulley, Wofford (AP, AFCA, STATS, WCFF)
- Abu Kamara, Yale (AFCA, SI, STATS, AP-2)
- Jarod Washington, South Carolina State (Phil Steele, SI, WCFF, AP-2)
- Kasyus Kurns, Tarleton State (AP, SI, WCFF)
- Kimal Clark, Indiana State (AP, STATS)
- Jalen Jones, William & Mary (Phil Steele, SI)
- Jeremiah McClendon, Southern Illinois (Phil Steele, AP-2)
- Shadwel Nkuba II, Illinois State (AP-2)

== Special teams ==
=== Placekicker ===
- Nick Reed, New Hampshire (AP, Phil Steele, STATS)
- Eli Ozick, North Dakota State (SI, AP-2)
- Ryan Short, Butler (WCFF)
- Carson Smith, Austin Peay (AFCA)

=== Punter ===
- Jeff Yurk, Elon (Phil Steele, SI, STATS, AP-2)
- Ben D’Aquila, Northern Arizona (AP)
- Max Pelham, South Dakota State (AFCA)
- Ben Shrewsbury, VMI (WCFF)

=== Return specialist / All-purpose ===
- Michael Wortham, Montana (AP, AFCA, Phil Steele, SI, STATS)
- Ja'briel Mace, Villanova (Phil Steele, STATS, WCFF)
- Bugs Mortimer, Stephen F. Austin (Phil Steele, SI, STATS)
- Javon Ross, Bethune-Cookman, (SI)
- Rodney Hammond Jr., Sacramento State (AP-2)

=== Long snapper ===
- Caleb Bowers, North Dakota State (STATS)
- Dylan Calabrese, Illinois State (Phil Steele)

== See also ==
- 2025 College Football All-America Team
- 2025 All-Big 12 Conference football team
- 2025 All-Big Ten Conference football team
- 2025 All-SEC football team
- 2025 All-ACC football team

== Sources ==
- Associated Press (AP):
- American Football Coaches Association (AFCA):
- Phil Steele:
- Stats Perform (STATS):
- Sports Illustrated (SI):
- Walter Camp Football Foundation (WCFF):
