= Justin Lamson =

American football player (born 2002)

No. 8 – Montana State Bobcats
- Position: Quarterback
- Class: Redshirt Senior

Personal information
- Born: November 9, 2002 (age 24)
- Listed height: 6 ft 2 in (1.88 m)
- Listed weight: 222 lb (101 kg)

Career information
- High school: Oak Ridge (El Dorado Hills, California)
- College: Syracuse (2021–2022); Stanford (2023–2024); Montana State (2025–present)

Awards and highlights
- FCS national champion (2025); FCS Championship Game MVP (2025); Big Sky Newcomer of the Year (2025); Second-team All-Big Sky (2025)
- Stats at ESPN

Justin Lamson (born November 9, 2002) is an American college football quarterback for the Montana State Bobcats. He previously played for the Syracuse Orange and Stanford Cardinal.

== Early life ==
Lamson attended Oak Ridge in El Dorado Hills, California. As quarterback for the Trojans, he led his team to a CIF Sac-Joaquin Section championship. He was also named 2019 NorCal Offensive Player of the Year and Sacramento Bee Player of the Year.

== College career ==
=== Syracuse ===
On February 9, 2021, Lamson enrolled at Syracuse. In 2021, he redshirted and did not appear in any games. In 2022, Lamson suffered a season-ending injury in spring practice. On April 30, 2023, he entered the NCAA transfer portal.

=== Stanford ===
On May 13, 2023, Lamson transferred to Stanford. In 2023, he competed with Ashton Daniels for the starting quarterback position. Lamson was a dual-threat quarterback for the Cardinal. He appeared in every game, including three starts where he led the team with rushing attempts and yards. He made his first collegiate start against Oregon, where he had a career high 22 rushing attempts. In the season finale against Notre Dame, Lamson had a season-best 82 yards rushing on ten carries, including a touchdown. In 2024, Lamson played in all 12 games, making one start against Virginia Tech. He led the team with eight rushing touchdowns on 64 carries.

On December 2, 2024, Lamson entered the transfer portal for the second time.

=== Montana State ===
On January 15, 2025, Lamson announced he was transferring to Bowling Green. With the departure of head coach Scot Loeffler leaving for the Philadelphia Eagles' coaching staff in March, Lamson reentered the transfer portal. On March 18, 2025, Lamson announced he was transferring to Montana State.

After opening the season with losses to FBS No. 7 Oregon and No. 2 South Dakota State in double overtime, Lamson led Montana State to 10 consecutive wins, including a 31–28 victory over rival Montana. In the victory, he completed 18 of 20 passes for 175 yards and a touchdown while adding 80 rushing yards and a touchdown. Finishing the regular season with a 10–2 record, the Bobcats received a first-round bye in the 2025 FCS playoffs. After playoff victories over Yale and Stephen F. Austin, the Bobcats faced Montana in a rematch, where Lamson accounted for four total touchdowns in a 48–23 victory. In the championship game against Illinois State, Lamson led the Bobcats to the NCAA Division I Football Championship in a 35–34 victory. In overtime, trailing 34–28, Lamson connected with Taco Dowler for a game-winning 14-yard touchdown pass on fourth-and-ten. Following the extra point, Montana State secured the 35–34 victory. Lamson finished the game completing 18 of 27 passes for 280 yards and two touchdowns while rushing for 30 yards and two touchdowns, earning Most Valuable Player honors. On the season, Lamson completed 255 of 356 passes for 3,172 yards, 26 touchdowns, and three interceptions. He started all 16 games for the Bobcats, posting one of the most productive seasons by a quarterback in program history. His 71.6 completion percentage set both a Big Sky Conference and Montana State single-season record. For his performance, he was named Big Sky Conference Newcomer of the Year and earned Second-team All-Big Sky honors.

=== Statistics ===
Season	Team	Games			Passing								Rushing			
Season	Team	GP	GS	Record (Note: Accounts for only GS as a QB. In 2023, Lamson started one game at WR.)	Cmp	Att	Pct	Yds	Y/A	TD	Int	Rtg	Att	Yds	Avg	TD
2021	Syracuse	Redshirted (redshirt)														
2022	Syracuse	DNP (injury—knee)														
2023	Stanford	12	3	1–1	38	88	49.2	504	5.7	0	2	86.7	120	334	2.8	5
2024	Stanford	12	1	0–1	24	47	51.1	300	6.4	4	2	124.3	68	94	1.4	8
2025	Montana State	16	16	14–2	255	356	71.6	3,172	8.9	26	3	168.9	176	734	4.2	16
2026	Montana State	8	8	8–0	148	212	69.8	1,712	8.1	14	1	158.6	56	227	4.1	5
FBS career		24	4	1–2	62	135	45.9	804	6.0	4	4	99.8	188	428	2.3	13
FCS career		24	24	22–2	403	568	71.0	4,884	8.6	40	4	163.8	232	961	4.1	21
