= 2025 Montana State Bobcats football team =

American college football season

2025 Montana State Bobcats football
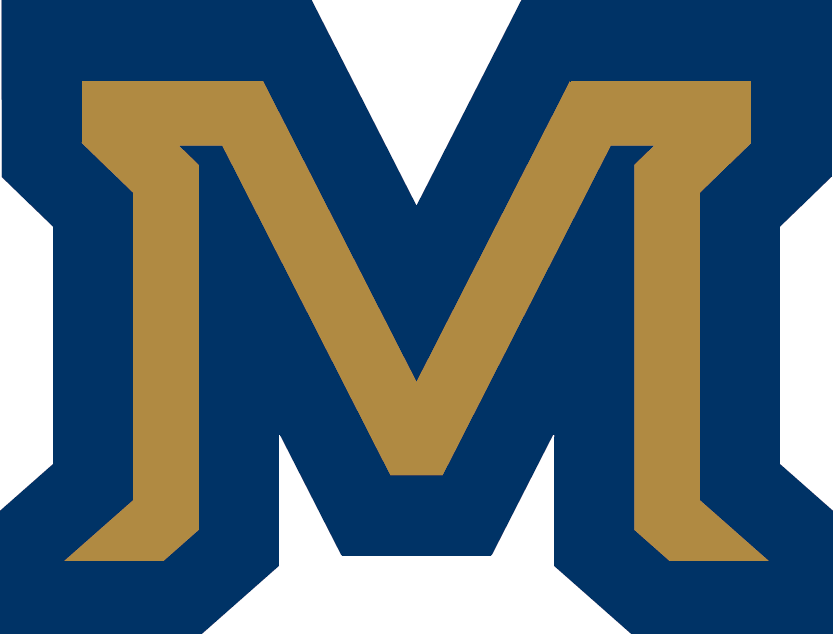

FCS champion Big Sky champion

FCS Championship Game, W 35–34 ^{OT} vs. Illinois State
- Conference: Big Sky Conference

Ranking
- STATS: No. 1
- FCS Coaches: No. 1
- Record: 14–2 (8–0 Big Sky)
- Head coach: Brent Vigen (5th season)
- Offensive coordinator: Pete Sterbick (1st season)
- Offensive scheme: Pro spread
- Defensive coordinator: Shawn Howe (2nd season)
- Base defense: 4–2–5
- Home stadium: Bobcat Stadium

2025 Big Sky Conference football standings
	Conf.			Overall
Team	W		L	W		L
No. 1 Montana State $^	8	–	0	14	–	2
No. 3 Montana ^	7	–	1	13	–	2
No. 8 UC Davis ^	6	–	2	9	–	4
Sacramento State	5	–	3	7	–	5
Idaho State	5	–	3	6	–	6
Northern Arizona	4	–	4	7	–	5
Eastern Washington	4	–	4	5	–	7
Cal Poly	2	–	6	4	–	8
Idaho	2	–	6	4	–	8
Northern Colorado	2	–	6	4	–	8
Weber State	2	–	6	4	–	8
Portland State	1	–	7	1	–	11
$ – Conference champion; ^ – FCS playoff participant; Rankings from STATS Poll

The 2025 Montana State Bobcats football team represented Montana State University as a member of the Big Sky Conference during the 2025 NCAA Division I FCS football season. The Bobcats were led by fifth-year head coach Brent Vigen and played home games on campus at Bobcat Stadium in Bozeman, Montana.

Montana State defeated in-state rival Montana on the road to clinch the Big Sky conference title. Seeded second in the FCS playoffs, they defeated Yale, Stephen F. Austin, and Montana (in the first ever December edition of the rivalry game) at home to reach their third FCS Championship Game in five seasons. In the championship game at Nashville, the Bobcats defeated Illinois State 35–34 in overtime to win the program's first national championship since 1984.

The Bobcats drew an average home attendance of 21,877, the fourth-highest in NCAA Division I FCS in 2025.

== 2025 NFL draft ==
Round	Pick	Player	Position	Team
6	213	Tommy Mellott	QB/WR	Las Vegas Raiders

== Transfers ==
=== Outgoing ===
Player	Position	Destination
Rohan Jones	TE	Arkansas
Elijah Elliott	RB	Bryant
Dru Polidore Jr.	S	California
Kai Golan	K	Carroll
Lonyatta Alexander Jr.	WR	Idaho
Conner Moore	OL	Michigan State
Cole Bullock	LB	New Hampshire
Scottre Humphrey	RB	New Mexico
Jon Johnson	DB	New Mexico
Ryder Trujillo	DL	Northeastern State
Zachary Dodson-Greene	WR	Portland State
Blake Stillwell	DB	Southern Utah
Andrew Powdrell	DB	UNLV
Garrett Walchli	WR	Unknown

=== Incoming ===
Player	Position	Previous school
Ife Ohalete	DB	Blinn
Cale Breslin	RB	BYU
George Helms	RB	Elon
Bryant Meredith	DB	Fullerton
Bryson Parker	DB	Nevada
Chris Long	WR	Rutgers
Justin Lamson	QB	Stanford

== Schedule ==
Date	Time	Opponent	Rank	Site	TV	Result	Attendance
August 30	2:00 p.m.	at No. 7 (FBS) Oregon*	No. 2	Autzen Stadium; Eugene, OR	BTN	L 13–59	57,257
September 6	6:00 p.m.	No. 2 South Dakota State*	No. 3	Bobcat Stadium; Bozeman, MT	ESPN+	L 24–30 ^{2OT}	22,117
September 13	1:00 p.m.	San Diego*	No. 4	Bobcat Stadium; Bozeman, MT	ESPN+	W 41–7	21,917
September 20	1:00 p.m.	Mercyhurst*	No. 4	Bobcat Stadium; Bozeman, MT	ESPN+	W 17–0	21,317
September 27	2:00 p.m.	Eastern Washington	No. 4	Bobcat Stadium; Bozeman, MT	ESPN+	W 57–3	22,277
October 4	3:00 p.m.	at No. 13 Northern Arizona	No. 5	Walkup Skydome; Flagstaff, AZ	ESPN+	W 34–10	7,837
October 11	1:00 p.m.	Idaho State	No. 5	Bobcat Stadium; Bozeman, MT	ESPN+	W 48–14	22,267
October 25	6:00 p.m.	at Cal Poly	No. 5	Alex G. Spanos Stadium; San Luis Obispo, CA	ESPN+	W 34–17	6,403
November 1	12:00 p.m.	at Northern Colorado	No. 4т	Nottingham Field; Greeley, CO	ESPN+	W 55–7	4,092
November 8	1:00 p.m.	Weber State	No. 3	Bobcat Stadium; Bozeman, MT	ESPN+	W 66–14	21,467
November 15	8:15 p.m.	No. 9 UC Davis	No. 3	Bobcat Stadium; Bozeman, MT	ESPN2	W 38–17	21,777
November 22	12:00 p.m.	at No. 2 Montana	No. 3	Washington–Grizzly Stadium; Missoula, MT (rivalry)	ESPN+	W 31–28	27,340
December 6	12:00 p.m.	No. 24 Yale*	No. 2	Bobcat Stadium; Bozeman, MT (NCAA Division I Second Round)	ESPN+	W 21–13	20,867
December 12	7:00 p.m.	No. 10 Stephen F. Austin*	No. 2	Bobcat Stadium; Bozeman, MT (NCAA Division I Quarterfinal)	ESPN	W 44–28	19,807
December 20	2:00 p.m.	No. 3 Montana*	No. 2	Bobcat Stadium; Bozeman, MT (NCAA Division I Semifinal)	ESPN2/ABC	W 48–23	25,437
January 5, 2026	5:30 p.m.	vs. No. 17т Illinois State*	No. 2	FirstBank Stadium; Nashville, TN (NCAA Division I Football Championship Game)	ESPN	W 35–34 ^{OT}	24,105
*Non-conference game; Rankings from STATS Poll released prior to the game; All times are in Mountain time; Source:

== Game summaries ==
=== at No. 7 (FBS) Oregon ===
No. 2 Montana State Bobcats (0–0) at No. 7 (FBS) Oregon Ducks (0–0) – Game summary

Quarter	1	2	3	4	Total
No. 2 Bobcats	0	3	3	7	13
No. 7 (FBS) Ducks	17	21	14	7	59

at Autzen Stadium • Eugene, Oregon

- Date: August 30
- Game time: 2:00 p.m. MDT / 1:00 p.m. PDT
- Game weather: Sunny, 73 °F (23 °C)
- Game attendance: 57,257
- Referee: Kole Knueppel
- TV announcers (BTN): Jeff Levering (play-by-play), Jake Butt (analyst), and Brooke Fletcher (sideline reporter)

Game information

First quarter

- ORE – Jayden Limar 16-yard run (Atticus Sappington kick), 11:57. Ducks 7–0. Drive: 6 plays, 74 yards, 2:03.
- ORE – Kenyon Sadiq 20-yard pass from Dante Moore (Atticus Sappington kick), 9:16. Ducks 14–0. Drive: 3 plays, 40 yards, 1:18.
- ORE – Atticus Sappington 23-yard field goal, 6:16. Ducks 17–0. Drive: 4 plays, 5 yards, 1:25.

Second quarter'

- ORE – Jordon Davison 2-yard run (Atticus Sappington kick), 11:08. Ducks 24–0. Drive: 12 plays, 59 yards, 5:27.
- ORE – Noah Whittington 1-yard run (Gage Hurych kick), 4:34. Ducks 31–0. Drive: 10 plays, 52 yards, 5:10.
- MTST – Myles Sansted 42-yard field goal, 1:03. Ducks 31–3. Drive: 13 plays, 50 yards, 3:31.
- ORE – Malik Benson 11-yard pass from Dante Moore (Atticus Sappington kick), 0:03. Ducks 38–3. Drive: 6 plays, 67 yards, 1:00.

Third quarter

- MTST – Myles Sansted 42-yard field goal, 10:14. Ducks 38–6. Drive: 9 plays, 51 yards, 4:46.
- ORE – Gary Bryant Jr. 14-yard pass from Dante Moore (Atticus Sappington kick), 6:43. Ducks 45–6. Drive: 6 plays, 70 yards, 3:31.
- ORE – Jordon Davison 8-yard run (Gage Hurych kick), 0:26. Ducks 52–6. Drive: 6 plays, 65 yards, 2:02.

Fourth quarter

- ORE – Jordon Davison 1-yard run (Gage Hurych kick), 6:50. Ducks 59–6. Drive: 8 plays, 80 yards, 4:47.
- MTST – Adam Jones 2-yard run (Myles Sansted kick), 2:22. Ducks 59–13. Drive: 9 plays, 75 yards, 4:28.

Statistics	MTST	ORE
First downs	17	29
Plays–yards	58–244	64–506
Rushes–yards	27–46	39–253
Passing yards	198	253
Passing: comp–att–int	23–31–0	19–25–0
Turnovers	0	0
Time of possession	29:55	30:08

Team	Category	Player	Statistics
Montana State	Passing	Justin Lamson	23/31, 198 yards
Montana State	Rushing	Julius Davis	5 carries, 16 yards
Montana State	Receiving	Taco Dowler	12 receptions, 107 yards
Oregon	Passing	Dante Moore	18/23, 213 yards, 3 TD
Oregon	Rushing	Noah Whittington	10 carries, 68 yards, TD
Oregon	Receiving	Malik Benson	5 receptions, 51 yards, TD

=== No. 2 South Dakota State ===
No. 2 South Dakota State Jackrabbits (1–0) at No. 3 Montana State Bobcats (0–1) – Game summary

Quarter	1	2	3	4	OT	2OT	Total
No. 2 Jackrabbits	3	7	0	7	7	6	30
No. 3 Bobcats	0	10	0	7	7	0	24

at Bobcat Stadium • Bozeman, Montana

- Date: September 6
- Game time: 6:00 p.m. MDT
- Game weather: Sunny • Temperature: 81 °F (27 °C) • Wind: NW at 1 mile per hour (1.6 km/h)
- Game attendance: 22,117
- Referee: Kelly Holman
- TV announcers (ESPN+): Ben Creighton (play-by-play), Ty Gregorak (analyst) and Grace Lawrence (sideline)

Game information

First quarter

- (9:02) SDST – Eli Stader 25-yard field goal (Drive: 11 plays, 68 yards, 5:58; South Dakota State 3–0)

Second quarter

- (10:47) MTST – Justin Lamson 7-yard run, Myles Sansted kick (Drive: 9 plays, 88 yards, 4:07; Montana State 7-3)
- (1:06) SDST – Chase Mason 8-yard run, Eli Stader kick (Drive: 2 plays, 21 yards, 0:46; South Dakota State 10-7)
- (0:00) MTST – Myles Sansted 33-yard field goal (Drive: 6 plays, 45 yards, 1:00; 10-10)

Third quarter

- No scoring plays.

Fourth quarter

- (9:08) SDST – Lofton O'Groske 8-yard pass from Chase Mason, Eli Stader kick (Drive: 7 plays, 50 yards, 3:40; South Dakota State 17-10)
- (6:37) MTST – Seth Brock 2-yard fumble return, Myles Sansted kick (Drive: 4 plays, -11 yards, 1:38; 17-17)

Overtime

- MTST – Adam Jones 2-yard run, Myles Sansted kick (Drive: 6 plays, 25 yards; Montana State 24-17)
- SDST – Lofton O'Groske 2-yard pass from Chase Mason, Eli Stader kick (Drive: 2 plays, 25 yards; 24-24)

2nd overtime

- SDST – Baryden Delahoyde 25-yard pass from Chase Mason, two-point pass conversion failed (Drive: 1 play, 25 yards; South Dakota State 30-24)

Statistics	SDST	MTST
First downs	16	17
Plays–yards	65–297	71–349
Rushes–yards	40–123	42–210
Passing yards	174	139
Passing: Comp–Att–Int	17–25–0	19–29–0
Turnovers	2	2
Time of possession	33:05	26:55

Team	Category	Player	Statistics
South Dakota State	Passing	Chase Mason	17/25, 174 yards, 3 TD
South Dakota State	Rushing	Julius Loughridge	23 carries, 99 yards
South Dakota State	Receiving	Lofton O'Groske	12 receptions, 125 yards, 2 TD
Montana State	Passing	Justin Lamson	18/28, 123 yards
Montana State	Rushing	Justin Lamson	20 carries, 96 yards, TD
Montana State	Receiving	Dane Steel	3 receptions, 49 yards

=== San Diego ===
San Diego Toreros (1–1) at No. 4 Montana State Bobcats (0–2) – Game summary

Quarter	1	2	3	4	Total
Toreros	0	0	0	7	7
No. 4 Bobcats	10	14	14	3	41

at Bobcat Stadium • Bozeman, Montana

- Date: September 13
- Game time: 1:00 p.m. MDT
- Game weather: Sunny, 65 °F (18 °C)
- Game attendance: 21,917
- Referee: Jeff Rink
- TV: ESPN+

Game information
First quarter
- MTST – Taco Dowler 45-yard pass from Justin Lamson (Myles Sansted kick), 9:21. Bobcats 7–0. Drive: 7 plays, 74 yards, 3:26.
- MTST – Myles Sansted 43-yard field goal, 2:53. Bobcats 10–0. Drive: 9 plays, 45 yards, 4:29.

Second quarter

- MTST – Adam Jones 17-yard pass from Justin Lamson (Myles Sansted kick), 6:32. Bobcats 17–0. Drive: 4 plays, 52 yards, 1:49.
- MTST – Justin Lamson 24-yard run (Myles Sansted kick), 0:22. Bobcats 24–0. Drive: 5 plays, 85 yards, 0:51.

Third quarter

- MTST – Taco Dowler 16-yard pass from Justin Lamson (Myles Sansted kick), 11:04. Bobcats 31–0. Drive: 8 plays, 75 yards, 3:56.
- MTST – Julius Davis 17-yard run (Myles Sansted kick), 5:41. Bobcats 38–0. Drive: 6 plays, 90 yards, 2:38.

Fourth quarter

- USD – Josh Heverly 8-yard pass from Dom Nankil (Emiliano Salazar kick), 12:59. Bobcats 38–7. Drive: 10 plays, 65 yards, 3:53.
- MTST – Myles Sansted 40-yard field goal, 6:51. Bobcats 41–7. Drive: 11 plays, 53 yards, 6:08.

Statistics	USD	MTST
First downs	12	28
Plays–yards	52–209	73–539
Rushes–yards	25–66	42–218
Passing yards	143	321
Passing: Comp–Att–Int	14–27–0	27–31–1
Turnovers	0	1
Time of possession	24:57	35:03

Team	Category	Player	Statistics
San Diego	Passing	Dom Nankil	13/24, 124 yards, TD
San Diego	Rushing	Adam Criter	10 carries, 49 yards
San Diego	Receiving	Peyton Smith	3 receptions, 35 yards
Montana State	Passing	Justin Lamson	23/26, 293 yards, 3 TD, INT
Montana State	Rushing	Julius Davis	8 carries, 83 yards, TD
Montana State	Receiving	Taco Dowler	8 receptions, 116 yards, 2 TD

=== Mercyhurst ===
Mercyhurst Lakers (1–2) at No. 4 Montana State Bobcats (1–2) – Game summary

Quarter	1	2	3	4	Total
Lakers	0	0	0	0	0
No. 4 Bobcats	7	10	0	0	17

at Bobcat Stadium • Bozeman, Montana

- Date: September 20
- Game time: 1:00 p.m. MDT
- Game weather: Sunny, 73 °F (23 °C)
- Game attendance: 21,317
- Referee: Spencer Mumford
- TV: ESPN+

Game information

First quarter

- MTST – Julius Davis 3-yard run (Myles Sansted kick), 9:06. Bobcats 7–0. Drive: 10 plays, 92 yards, 5:49.

Second quarter

- MTST – Myles Sansted 22-yard field goal, 12:06. Bobcats 10–0. Drive: 18 plays, 76 yards, 7:51.
- MTST – Adam Jones 5-yard run (Myles Sansted kick), 0:40. Bobcats 17–0. Drive: 11 plays, 83 yards, 4:35.

Third quarter

- No scoring plays.

Fourth quarter

- No scoring plays.

Statistics	MERC	MTST
First downs	15	20
Plays–yards	59–263	58–354
Rushes–yards	23–58	41–233
Passing yards	205	121
Passing: Comp–Att–Int	24–36–1	12–17–1
Turnovers	2	1
Time of possession	31:26	28:34

Team	Category	Player	Statistics
Mercyhurst	Passing	Adam Urena	23/35, 206 yards, INT
Mercyhurst	Rushing	Brian Trobel	13 carries, 48 yards
Mercyhurst	Receiving	Rylan Davison	7 receptions, 84 yards
Montana State	Passing	Justin Lamson	12/17, 121 yards, INT
Montana State	Rushing	Colson Coon	5 carries, 71 yards
Montana State	Receiving	Adam Jones	3 receptions, 31 yards

=== Eastern Washington ===
Eastern Washington Eagles (1–3) at No. 4 Montana State Bobcats (2–2) – Game summary

Quarter	1	2	3	4	Total
Eagles	0	3	0	0	3
No. 4 Bobcats	24	6	20	7	57

at Bobcat Stadium • Bozeman, Montana

- Date: September 27
- Game time: 1:00 p.m. MDT
- Game weather: Sunny, 71 °F (22 °C)
- Game attendance: 22,277
- Referee: Jim Crowley
- TV announcers (ESPN+): Ben Creighton (play-by-play), Ty Gregorak (analyst) and Grace Lawrence (sideline)

Game information

First quarter

- MTST – Adam Jones 3-yard run (Myles Sansted kick), 9:53. Bobcats 7–0. Drive: 8 plays, 53 yards, 3:53.
- MTST – Hunter Provience 43-yard pass from Justin Lamson (Myles Sansted kick), 6:16. Bobcats 14–0. Drive: 2 plays, 44 yards, 0:43.
- MTST – Taco Dowler 45-yard pass from Justin Lamson (Myles Sansted kick), 4:47. Bobcats 21–0. Drive: 1 play, 45 yards, 0:07.
- MTST – Myles Sansted 43-yard field goal, 0:20. Bobcats 24–0. Drive: 6 plays, 19 yards, 2:28.

Second quarter

- EWU – Soren McKee 21-yard field goal, 6:29. Bobcats 24–3. Drive: 11 plays, 63 yards, 4:21.
- MTST – Jabez Woods 28-yard pass from Justin Lamson (kick failed), 0:22. Bobcats 30–3. Drive: 3 plays, 40 yards, 0:15.

Third quarter

- MTST – Colby Frokjer 26-yard run (kick failed), 10:48. Bobcats 36–3. Drive: 9 plays, 75 yards, 4:12.
- MTST – Adam Jones 37-yard run (Myles Sansted kick), 3:22. Bobcats 43–3. Drive: 9 plays, 80 yards, 4:31.
- MTST – Colson Coon 1-yard run (Myles Sansted kick), 1:23. Bobcats 50–3. Drive: 2 plays, 55 yards, 0:40.

Fourth quarter

- MTST – Chance Wilson 32-yard run (Myles Sansted kick), 4:38. Bobcats 57–3. Drive: 4 plays, 45 yards, 1:37.

Statistics	EWU	MTST
First downs	14	25
Plays–yards	67–207	70–580
Rushes–yards	36–83	44–293
Passing yards	124	287
Passing: Comp–Att–Int	15–31–0	15–26–1
Turnovers	1	1
Time of possession	27:54	32:06

Team	Category	Player	Statistics
Eastern Washington	Passing	Jared Taylor	5/12, 59 yards
Eastern Washington	Rushing	Nate Bell	13 carries, 41 yards
Eastern Washington	Receiving	Nolan Ulm	1 reception, 35 yards
Montana State	Passing	Justin Lamson	13/20, 270 yards, 3 TD
Montana State	Rushing	Adam Jones	10 carries, 72 yards, 2 TD
Montana State	Receiving	Taco Dowler	3 receptions, 64 yards, TD

=== at No. 13 Northern Arizona ===
No. 5 Montana State Bobcats (3–2) at No. 13 Northern Arizona Lumberjacks (4–1) – Game summary

Quarter	1	2	3	4	Total
No. 4 Bobcats	0	20	7	7	34
No. 13 Lumberjacks	7	0	0	3	10

at Walkup Skydome • Flagstaff, Arizona

- Date: October 4
- Game time: 3:00 p.m. MDT
- Game weather: None (played indoors)
- Game attendance: 7,837
- Referee: Gregg Wilson
- TV announcers (ESPN+): Ben Creighton (play-by-play), Ty Gregorak (analyst) and Grace Lawrence (sideline)

Game information

First quarter

- NAU – Seth Cromwell 2-yard run (Samuel Hunsaker kick), 1:32. Lumberjacks 7–0. Drive: 12 plays, 57 yards, 5:48.

Second quarter

- MTST – Taco Dowler 90-yard punt return (Myles Sansted kick), 7:40. Tied 7–7.
- MTST – Jabez Woods 79-yard pass from Justin Lamson (Myles Sansted kick), 6:01. Bobcats 14–7. Drive: 3 plays, 75 yards, 1:14.
- MTST – Julius Davis 13-yard run (kick failed), 0:59. Bobcats 20–7. Drive: 5 plays, 80 yards, 1:28.

Third quarter

- MTST – Rocky Lencioni 3-yard pass from Justin Lamson (Myles Sansted kick), 10:50. Bobcats 27–7. Drive: 9 plays, 75 yards, 4:10.

Fourth quarter

- MTST – Justin Lamson 19-yard run (Myles Sansted kick), 12:51. Bobcats 34–7. Drive: 3 plays, 39 yards, 1:17.
- NAU – Samuel Hunsaker 39-yard field goal, 5:11. Bobcats 34–10. Drive: 16 plays, 55 yards, 7:32.

Statistics	MTST	NAU
First downs	18	22
Plays–yards	52–417	78–296
Rushes–yards	32–196	31–86
Passing yards	221	210
Passing: Comp–Att–Int	14–20–0	28–47–1
Turnovers	0	1
Time of possession	24:27	35:33

Team	Category	Player	Statistics
Montana State	Passing	Justin Lamson	13/19, 213 yards, 2 TD
Montana State	Rushing	Julius Davis	10 carries, 73 yards, TD
Montana State	Receiving	Jabez Woods	3 receptions, 100 yards, TD
Northern Arizona	Passing	Ty Pennington	28/47, 210 yards, INT
Northern Arizona	Rushing	Seth Cromwell	10 carries, 40 yards, TD
Northern Arizona	Receiving	Quran Gossett	4 receptions, 45 yards

=== Idaho State ===
Idaho State Bengals (2–4) at No. 5 Montana State Bobcats (4–2) – Game summary

Quarter	1	2	3	4	Total
Bengals	7	7	0	0	14
No. 5 Bobcats	14	20	7	7	48

at Bobcat Stadium • Bozeman, Montana

- Date: October 11
- Game time: 1:00 p.m. MDT
- Game weather: Cloudy, 53 °F (12 °C)
- Game attendance: 22,267
- Referee: Robert Quello
- TV: ESPN+

Game information

First quarter

- MTST – Julius Davis 22-yard pass from Justin Lamson (Myles Sansted kick), 12:22. Bobcats 7–0. Drive: 6 plays, 75 yards, 2:38.
- MTST – Dane Steel 15-yard pass from Justin Lamson (Myles Sansted kick), 8:17. Bobcats 14–0. Drive: 5 plays, 74 yards, 2:29.
- IDST – Michael Shulikov 7-yard pass from Jordan Cooke (Trajan Sinatra kick), 1:13. Bobcats 14–7. Drive: 9 plays, 65 yards, 3:24.

Second quarter

- MTST – Adam Jones 24-yard run (Myles Sansted kick failed), 14:21. Bobcats 20–7. Drive: 5 plays, 75 yards, 1:52.
- IDST – Tsion Nunnally 69-yard pass from Jordan Cooke (Trajan Sinatra kick), 13:47. Bobcats 20–14. Drive: 2 plays, 75 yards, 0:34.
- MTST – Justin Lamson 7-yard run (Myles Sansted kick), 5:54. Bobcats 27–14. Drive: 13 plays, 75 yards, 7:53.
- MTST – Rocky Lencioni 13-yard pass from Justin Lamson (Myles Sansted kick), 0:25. Bobcats 34–14. Drive: 11 plays, 94 yards, 3:28.

Third quarter

- MTST – Rocky Lencioni 22-yard pass from Justin Lamson (Myles Sansted kick), 3:49. Bobcats 41–14. Drive: 10 plays, 80 yards, 4:21.

Fourth quarter

- MTST – Patrick Duchien 4-yard run (Myles Sansted kick), 2:37. Bobcats 48–14. Drive: 3 plays, 38 yards, 1:16.

Statistics	IDST	MTST
First downs	17	35
Plays–yards	65–404	74–568
Rushes–yards	17–36	53–384
Passing yards	368	184
Passing: Comp–Att–Int	26–48–2	17–21–0
Turnovers	3	0
Time of possession	24:22	35:38

Team	Category	Player	Statistics
Idaho State	Passing	Jordan Cooke	20/37, 307 yards, 2 TD, INT
Idaho State	Rushing	Carson Sudburry	6 carries, 16 yards
Idaho State	Receiving	Tsion Nunnally	9 receptions, 169 yards, TD
Montana State	Passing	Justin Lamson	17/21, 184 yards, 4 TD
Montana State	Rushing	Adam Jones	16 carries, 173 yards, TD
Montana State	Receiving	Taco Dowler	6 receptions, 45 yards

=== at Cal Poly ===
No. 5 Montana State Bobcats (5–2) at Cal Poly Mustangs (3–4) – Game summary

Quarter	1	2	3	4	Total
No. 5 Bobcats	3	10	7	14	34
Mustangs	0	3	0	14	17

at Alex G. Spanos Stadium • San Luis Obispo, California

- Date: October 25
- Game time: 6:00 p.m. MDT / 5:00 p.m. PDT
- Game weather: Sunny • Temperature: 67 °F (19 °C) • Wind: NW at 10 miles per hour (16 km/h)
- Game attendance: 6,403
- Referee: Mike Bezner
- TV announcers (ESPN+): Ben Creighton (play-by-play), Ty Gregorak (analyst) and Grace Lawrence (sideline)

Game information

First quarter

- MTST – Myles Sansted 25-yard field goal, 3:06. Bobcats 3–0. Drive: 15 plays, 56 yards, 7:23.

Second quarter

- MTST – Jared White 19-yard pass from Justin Lamson (Myles Sansted kick), 8:16. Bobcats 10–0. Drive: 4 plays, 45 yards, 1:50.
- CP – Noah Serna 21-yard field goal, 2:52. Bobcats 10–3. Drive: 12 plays, 72 yards, 5:19.
- MTST – Myles Sansted 31-yard field goal, 0:04. Bobcats 13–3. Drive: 8 plays, 30 yards, 0:52.

Third quarter

- MTST – Julius Davis 10-yard run (Myles Sansted kick), 10:59. Bobcats 20–3. Drive: 7 plays, 73 yards, 3:56.

Fourth quarter

- MTST – Justin Lamson 4-yard run (Myles Sansted kick), 14:52. Bobcats 27–3. Drive: 9 plays, 80 yards, 4:33.
- CP – Fidel Tau Pitts 16-yard pass from Bo Kelly (Gianluca Dimauro kick), 12:25. Bobcats 27–10. Drive: 6 plays, 77 yards, 2:23.
- CP – Logan Booher 6-yard pass from Bo Kelly (Noah Serna kick), 8:16. Bobcats 27–17. Drive: 7 plays, 56 yards, 3:22.
- MTST – Adam Jones 1-yard run (Myles Sansted kick), 3:35. Bobcats 34–17. Drive: 8 plays, 40 yards, 4:31.

Statistics	MTST	CP
First downs	26	12
Plays–yards	80–466	50–241
Rushes–yards	50–290	15–50
Passing yards	176	191
Passing: Comp–Att–Int	19–30–0	22–35–1
Turnovers	1	1
Time of possession	36:31	23:29

Team	Category	Player	Statistics
Montana State	Passing	Justin Lamson	19/30, 176 yards, TD
Montana State	Rushing	Julius Davis	19 carries, 175 yards, TD
Montana State	Receiving	Taco Dowler	6 receptions, 57 yards
Cal Poly	Passing	Bo Kelly	20/30, 188 yards, 2 TD, INT
Cal Poly	Rushing	Trey Wilson	6 carries, 21 yards
Cal Poly	Receiving	Michael Briscoe	4 receptions, 39 yards

=== at Northern Colorado ===
No. 4т Montana State Bobcats (6–2) at Northern Colorado Bears (3–5) – Game summary

Quarter	1	2	3	4	Total
No. 4т Bobcats	7	13	21	14	55
Bears	0	0	0	7	7

at Nottingham Field • Greeley, Colorado

- Date: November 1
- Game time: 12:00 p.m. MDT
- Game weather: Sunny, 48 °F (9 °C)
- Game attendance: 4,092
- Referee: Gregg Wilson
- TV: ESPN+

Game information

First quarter

- MTST – Rocky Lencioni 3-yard pass from Justin Lamson (Myles Sansted kick), 11:01. Bobcats 7–0. Drive: 6 plays, 69 yards, 2:25.

Second quarter

- MTST – Myles Sansted 26-yard field goal, 11:41. Bobcats 10–0. Drive: 13 plays, 75 yards, 5:49.
- MTST – Myles Sansted 24-yard field goal, 3:32. Bobcats 13–0. Drive: 8 plays, 48 yards, 2:27.
- MTST – Adam Jones 2-yard run (Myles Sansted kick), 0:39. Bobcats 20–0. Drive: 7 plays, 85 yards, 0:45.

Third quarter

- MTST – Taco Dowler 67-yard pass from Justin Lamson (Myles Sansted kick), 14:37. Bobcats 27–0. Drive: 2 plays, 75 yards, 0:23.
- MTST – Taco Dowler 18-yard pass from Justin Lamson (Myles Sansted kick), 4:22. Bobcats 34–0. Drive: 4 plays, 81 yards, 2:05.

Fourth quarter

- MTST – Justin Lamson 15-yard run (Myles Sansted kick), 14:52. Bobcats 41–0. Drive: 3 plays, 53 yards, 1:11.
- MTST – Talon Marsh 90-yard interception return (Myles Sansted kick), 9:09. Bobcats 48–0.
- MTST – Jared White 2-yard run (Myles Sansted kick), 6:32. Bobcats 55–0. Drive: 5 plays, 29 yards, 2:28.
- UNCO – Kieryus Boone 6-yard run (Jacob Willig kick), 1:31. Bobcats 55–7. Drive: 12 plays, 75 yards, 5:01.

Statistics	MTST	UNCO
First downs	23	17
Plays–yards	61–532	75–261
Rushes–yards	38–189	35–104
Passing yards	343	157
Passing: Comp–Att–Int	17–23–0	24–40–1
Turnovers	0	2
Time of possession	24:38	35:22

Team	Category	Player	Statistics
Montana State	Passing	Justin Lamson	16/22, 331 yards, 3 TD
Montana State	Rushing	Adam Jones	10 carries, 74 yards, TD
Montana State	Receiving	Taco Dowler	5 receptions, 138 yards, 2 TD
Northern Colorado	Passing	Eric Gibson Jr.	19/33, 93 yards, INT
Northern Colorado	Rushing	Mathias Price	8 carries, 54 yards
Northern Colorado	Receiving	Brayden Munroe	7 receptions, 61 yards

=== Weber State ===
Weber State Wildcats (3–6) at No. 3 Montana State Bobcats (7–2) – Game summary

Quarter	1	2	3	4	Total
Wildcats	0	7	0	7	14
No. 3 Bobcats	14	17	21	14	66

at Bobcat Stadium • Bozeman, Montana

- Date: November 8
- Game time: 1:00 p.m. MST
- Game weather: Sunny, 43 °F (6 °C)
- Game attendance: 21,467
- Referee: Spencer Mumford
- TV: ESPN+

Game information

First quarter

- MTST – Justin Lamson 5-yard run (Myles Sansted kick), 6:20. Bobcats 7–0. Drive: 10 plays, 47 yards, 4:22.
- MTST – Julius Davis 52-yard run (Myles Sansted kick), 0:23. Bobcats 14–0. Drive: 1 play, 52 yards, 0:10.

Second quarter

- MTST – Adam Jones 2-yard run (Myles Sansted kick), 9:30. Bobcats 21–0. Drive: 10 plays, 67 yards, 5:20.
- MTST – Rocky Lencioni 4-yard pass from Justin Lamson (Myles Sansted kick), 6:31. Bobcats 28–0. Drive: 4 plays, 20 yards, 1:26.
- WEB – Spencer Ferguson 4-yard run (Sloan Calder kick), 0:35. Bobcats 28–7. Drive: 12 plays, 81 yards, 5:56.
- MTST – Myles Sansted 48-yard field goal, 0:04. Bobcats 31–7. Drive: 3 plays, 0 yards, 0:24.

Third quarter

- MTST – Ryan King 9-yard pass from Justin Lamson (Myles Sansted kick), 10:45. Bobcats 38–7. Drive: 8 plays, 75 yards, 4:15.
- MTST – Julius Davis 1-yard run (Myles Sansted kick), 6:42. Bobcats 45–7. Drive: 5 plays, 37 yards, 2:21.
- MTST – Justin Lamson 12-yard run (Myles Sansted kick), 4:45. Bobcats 52–7. Drive: 1 play, 12 yards, 0:07.

Fourth quarter

- MTST – Jordan Reed 25-yard pass from Patrick Duchien (Myles Sansted kick), 14:30. Bobcats 59–7. Drive: 4 plays, 74 yards, 1:51.
- WEB – Mason York 5-yard pass from Dijon Jennings (Sloan Calder kick), 8:26. Bobcats 59–14. Drive: 11 plays, 62 yards, 6:04.
- MTST – Chance Wilson 15-yard run (Myles Sansted kick), 1:35. Bobcats 66–14. Drive: 8 plays, 60 yards, 2:37.

Statistics	WEB	MTST
First downs	12	29
Plays–yards	64–285	62–452
Rushes–yards	35–178	40–269
Passing yards	107	183
Passing: Comp–Att–Int	17–29–2	17–22–0
Turnovers	4	2
Time of possession	31:49	28:11

Team	Category	Player	Statistics
Weber State	Passing	Dijon Jennings	12/18, 85 yards, TD, INT
Weber State	Rushing	Spencer Ferguson	22 carries, 88 yards, TD
Weber State	Receiving	Marvin Session	5 receptions, 65 yards
Montana State	Passing	Justin Lamson	12/16, 117 yards, 2 TD
Montana State	Rushing	Julius Davis	10 carries, 114 yards, 2 TD
Montana State	Receiving	Taco Dowler	2 receptions, 28 yards

=== No. 9 UC Davis ===
No. 9 UC Davis Aggies (7–2) at No. 3 Montana State Bobcats (8–2) – Game summary

Quarter	1	2	3	4	Total
No. 9 Aggies	7	0	0	10	17
No. 3 Bobcats	0	14	10	14	38

at Bobcat Stadium • Bozeman, Montana

- Date: November 15
- Game time: 8:15 p.m. MST
- Game weather: Clear, 43 °F (6 °C)
- Game attendance: 21,777
- Referee: Jim Crowley
- TV announcers (ESPN2): Courtney Lyle (play by play) and Rene Ingoglia (analyst)

Game information

First quarter

- UCD – Ian Simpson 29-yard pass from Caden Pinnick (Hunter Ridley kick), 6:00. Aggies 7–0. Drive: 6 plays, 73 yards, 2:55.

Second quarter

- MTST – Justin Lamson 3-yard run (Myles Sansted kick), 14:00. Tied 7–7. Drive: 7 plays, 80 yards, 3:05.
- MTST – Chris Long 18-yard pass from Justin Lamson (Myles Sansted kick), 1:38. Bobcats 14–7. Drive: 6 plays, 63 yards, 1:52.

Third quarter

- MTST – Myles Sansted 28-yard field goal, 9:09. Bobcats 17–7. Drive: 8 plays, 56 yards, 3:58.
- MTST – Caden Dowler 83-yard interception return (Myles Sansted kick), 4:22. Bobcats 24–7.

Fourth quarter

- UCD – Hunter Ridley 36-yard field goal, 14:57. Bobcats 24–10. Drive: 9 plays, 57 yards, 4:25.
- MTST – Julius Davis 1-yard run (Myles Sansted kick), 8:09. Bobcats 31–10. Drive: 10 plays, 12 yards, 2:43.
- UCD – Samuel Gbatu Jr. 10-yard pass from Caden Pinnick (Hunter Ridley kick), 3:50. Bobcats 31–17. Drive: 8 plays, 75 yards, 4:19.
- MTST – Justin Lamson 18-yard run (Myles Sansted kick), 1:53. Bobcats 38–17. Drive: 5 plays, 75 yards, 1:57.

Statistics	UCD	MTST
First downs	28	15
Plays–yards	83–424	50–377
Rushes–yards	46–190	32–233
Passing yards	234	144
Passing: Comp–Att–Int	22–37–2	10–18–0
Turnovers	2	0
Time of possession	37:14	22:46

Team	Category	Player	Statistics
UC Davis	Passing	Caden Pinnick	22/36, 234 yards, 2 TD, 2 INT
UC Davis	Rushing	Jordan Fisher	17 carries, 76 yards
UC Davis	Receiving	Samuel Gbatu Jr.	10 receptions, 80 yards, TD
Montana State	Passing	Justin Lamson	10/18, 144 yards, TD
Montana State	Rushing	Justin Lamson	11 carries, 97 yards, 2 TD
Montana State	Receiving	Taco Dowler	5 receptions, 78 yards

=== at No. 2 Montana (Brawl of the Wild) ===
No. 3 Montana State Bobcats (9–2) at No. 2 Montana Grizzlies (11–0) – Game summary

Quarter	1	2	3	4	Total
No. 3 Bobcats	10	7	7	7	31
No. 2 Grizzlies	7	7	7	7	28

at Washington–Grizzly Stadium • Missoula, Montana

- Date: November 22
- Game time: 12:00 p.m. MST
- Game weather: Clear, 45 °F (7 °C)
- Game attendance: 27,340
- Referee: Kelly Holman
- TV: ESPN+

Game information

First quarter

- MTST – Myles Sansted 39-yard field goal, 9:46. Bobcats 3–0. Drive: 10 plays, 51 yards, 5:08.
- MONT – Brooks Davis 14-yard pass from Keali'i Ah Yat (Ty Morrison kick), 6:59. Grizzlies 7–3. Drive: 6 plays, 54 yards, 2:38.
- MTST – Adam Jones 1-yard run (Myles Sansted kick), 0:47. Bobcats 10–7. Drive: 11 plays, 77 yards, 6:06.

Second quarter

- MTST – Dane Steel 27-yard pass from Justin Lamson (Myles Sansted kick), 5:00. Bobcats 17–7. Drive: 2 plays, 52 yards, 0:51.
- MONT – Kealiʻi Ah Yat 18-yard run (Ty Morrison kick), 1:15. Bobcats 17–14. Drive: 10 plays, 72 yards, 3:38.

Third quarter

- MONT – Michael Wortham 5-yard run (Ty Morrison kick), 6:08. Grizzlies 21–17. Drive: 16 plays, 81 yards, 8:46.
- MTST – Caden Dowler 34-yard interception return (Myles Sansted kick), 1:07. Bobcats 24–21.

Fourth quarter

- MTST – Justin Lamson 23-yard run (Myles Sansted kick), 8:58. Bobcats 31–21. Drive: 9 plays, 65 yards, 4:22.
- MONT – Eli Gillman 52-yard run (Ty Morrison kick), 6:59. Bobcats 31–28. Drive: 5 plays, 83 yards, 1:52.

Statistics	MTST	MONT
First downs	23	20
Plays–yards	62–416	60–364
Rushes–yards	42–241	28–178
Passing yards	175	186
Passing: Comp–Att–Int	18–20–0	26–32–1
Turnovers	0	1
Time of possession	31:57	28:03

Team	Category	Player	Statistics
Montana State	Passing	Justin Lamson	18/20, 175 yards, TD
Montana State	Rushing	Julius Davis	15 carries, 106 yards
Montana State	Receiving	Dane Steel	4 receptions, 54 yards, TD
Montana	Passing	Keali'i Ah Yat	26/32, 186 yards, TD, INT
Montana	Rushing	Eli Gillman	15 carries, 132 yards, TD
Montana	Receiving	Brooks Davis	10 receptions, 113 yards, TD

=== No. 24 Yale (Division I Second Round) ===
2025 NCAA Division I FCS Playoffs Second Round
No. 24 Yale Bulldogs (9–2) at No. 2 (2) Montana State Bobcats (10–2) – Game summary

Quarter	1	2	3	4	Total
No. 24 Bulldogs	0	0	0	13	13
No. 2 (2) Bobcats	7	0	7	7	21

at Bobcat Stadium, Bozeman, Montana

- Date: December 6
- Game time: 12:00 p.m. MST
- Game weather: Snow, 36 °F (2 °C)
- Game attendance: 20,867
- Referee: Zach Erdmann
- TV announcers (ESPN+): Jason Ross Jr. (play by play) and Tyoka Jackson (analyst)

Game information

First quarter

- MTST – Chris Long 0-yard fumble return (Myles Sansted kick), 2:56. Bobcats 7–0.

Second quarter

- No scoring plays.

Third quarter

- MTST – Julius Davis 3-yard run (Myles Sansted kick), 1:51. Bobcats 14–0. Drive: 9 plays, 70 yards, 4:18.

Fourth quarter

- YALE – Nico Brown 25-yard pass from Dante Reno (run failed), 14:18. Bobcats 14–6. Drive: 5 plays, 61 yards, 2:33.
- MTST – Adam Jones 33-yard run (Myles Sansted kick), 10:20. Bobcats 21–6. Drive: 7 plays, 73 yards, 3:58.
- YALE – Josh Pitsenberger 6-yard run (Noah Piper kick), 2:09. Bobcats 21–13. Drive: 5 plays, 54 yards, 2:01.

Statistics	YALE	MTST
First downs	24	20
Plays–yards	75–351	58–341
Rushes–yards	39–153	42–249
Passing yards	198	92
Passing: Comp–Att–Int	20–36–3	10–16–0
Turnovers	4	1
Time of possession	33:55	26:05

Team	Category	Player	Statistics
Yale	Passing	Dante Reno	20/35, 198 yards, TD, 2 INT
Yale	Rushing	Josh Pitsenberger	26 carries, 124 yards, TD
Yale	Receiving	Nico Brown	11 receptions, 107 yards, TD
Montana State	Passing	Justin Lamson	10/16, 92 yards
Montana State	Rushing	Adam Jones	18 carries, 107 yards, TD
Montana State	Receiving	Adam Jones	2 receptions, 34 yards

=== No. 10 Stephen F. Austin (Division I Quarterfinal) ===
2025 NCAA Division I FCS Playoffs Quarterfinal
No. 10 (7) Stephen F. Austin Lumberjacks (11–2) at No. 2 (2) Montana State Bobcats (11–2) – Game summary

Quarter	1	2	3	4	Total
No. 10 (7) Lumberjacks	0	8	13	7	28
No. 2 (2) Bobcats	7	17	10	10	44

at Bobcat Stadium • Bozeman, Montana

- Date: December 12
- Game time: 7:00 p.m. MST
- Game weather: Sunny, 38 °F (3 °C)
- Game attendance: 19,807
- Referee: Jason Berg
- TV announcers (ESPN): Clay Matvick (play by play), Chase Daniel (analyst) and Morgan Uber (sideline reporter)

Game information

First quarter

- MTST – Adam Jones 1-yard run (Myles Sansted kick), 5:13. Bobcats 7–0. Drive: 10 plays, 65 yards, 5:35.

Second quarter

- MTST – Adam Jones 21-yard pass from Justin Lamson (Myles Sansted kick), 15:00. Bobcats 14–0. Drive: 9 plays, 57 yards, 4:04.
- MTST – Myles Sansted 47-yard field goal, 1:50. Bobcats 17–0. Drive: 6 plays, 14 yards, 2:33.
- MTST – Luvens Valcin 3-yard pass from Justin Lamson (Myles Sansted kick), 1:33. Bobcats 24–0. Drive: 2 plays, 18 yards, 0:08.
- SFA – Clayton Wayland 11-yard pass from Sam Vidlak (Sam Vidlak pass to Clayton Wayland), 0:11. Bobcats 24–8. Drive: 6 plays, 75 yards, 1:22.

Third quarter

- SFA – Jaylen Jenkins 5-yard run (pass failed), 9:04. Bobcats 24–14. Drive: 14 plays, 76 yards, 5:56.
- MTST – Myles Sansted 36-yard field goal, 6:07. Bobcats 27–14. Drive: 6 plays, 45 yards, 2:51.
- MTST – Justin Lamson 5-yard run (Myles Sansted kick), 3:04. Bobcats 34–14. Drive: 6 plays, 66 yards, 2:39.
- SFA – Jaylen Jenkins 6-yard run (Carlos Alvarado kick), 0:16. Bobcats 34–21. Drive: 8 plays, 87 yards, 2:48.

Fourth quarter

- MTST – Adam Jones 16-yard run (Myles Sansted kick), 14:36. Bobcats 41–21. Drive: 3 plays, 69 yards, 0:40.
- SFA – Gavin Rutherford 2-yard run (Carlos Alvarado kick), 10:05. Bobcats 41–28. Drive: 12 plays, 77 yards, 4:31.
- MTST – Myles Sansted 23-yard field goal, 1:52. Bobcats 44–28. Drive: 13 plays, 69 yards, 8:13.

Statistics	SFA	MTST
First downs	22	25
Plays–yards	72–344	68–473
Rushes–yards	29–102	42–227
Passing yards	242	246
Passing: Comp–Att–Int	26–43–1	20–26–1
Turnovers	3	1
Time of possession	24:32	35:28

Team	Category	Player	Statistics
Stephen F. Austin	Passing	Sam Vidlak	26/43, 242 yards, TD, INT
Stephen F. Austin	Rushing	Jerrell Wimbley	11 carries, 75 yards
Stephen F. Austin	Receiving	Kylon Harris	11 receptions, 85 yards
Montana State	Passing	Justin Lamson	20/26, 246 yards, 2 TD, INT
Montana State	Rushing	Adam Jones	9 carries, 114 yards, 2 TD
Montana State	Receiving	Dane Steel	3 receptions, 68 yards

=== No. 3 Montana (Division I Semifinal) ===
2025 NCAA Division I FCS Playoffs Semifinal
No. 3 (3) Montana Grizzlies (13–1) at No. 2 (2) Montana State Bobcats (12–2) – Game summary

Quarter	1	2	3	4	Total
No. 3 (3) Grizzlies	0	16	7	0	23
No. 2 (2) Bobcats	13	7	7	21	48

at Bobcat Stadium • Bozeman, Montana

- Date: December 20
- Game time: 2:00 p.m. MST
- Game weather: Sunny, 33 °F (1 °C)
- Game attendance: 22,277
- Referee: Bruce Austin
- TV announcers (ESPN2/ABC): Dave Flemming (play by play), Brock Osweiler (analyst) and Dawn Davenport (sideline reporter)

Game information

First quarter

- MTST – Justin Lamson 4-yard run (Myles Sansted kick), 10:40. Bobcats 7–0. Drive: 7 plays, 60 yards, 3:18.
- MTST – Adam Jones 7-yard run (pass failed), 2:59. Bobcats 13–0. Drive: 10 plays, 55 yards, 4:22.

Second quarter

- MONT – Jo Silver 21-yard field goal, 12:52. Bobcats 13–3. Drive: 13 plays, 72 yards, 5:07.
- MTST – Adam Jones 54-yard run (Myles Sansted kick), 11:25. Bobcats 20–3. Drive: 3 plays, 68 yards, 1:27.
- MONT – Eli Gillman 17-yard run (run failed), 7:02. Bobcats 20–9. Drive: 9 plays, 75 yards, 4:23.
- MONT – Keali'i Ah Yat 5-yard run (Jo Silver kick), 0:12. Bobcats 20–16. Drive: 8 plays, 40 yards, 3:11.

Third quarter

- MONT – Jake Olson 1-yard pass from Keali'i Ah Yat (Jo Silver kick), 8:47. Grizzlies 23–20. Drive: 7 plays, 80 yards, 3:15.
- MTST – Rocky Lencioni 2-yard pass from Justin Lamson (Myles Sansted kick), 2:07. Bobcats 27–23. Drive: 14 plays, 75 yards, 6:40.

Fourth quarter

- MTST – Taco Dowler 87-yard pass from Justin Lamson (Myles Sansted kick), 12:05. Bobcats 34–23. Drive: 5 plays, 90 yards, 2:40.
- MTST – Justin Lamson 7-yard run (Myles Sansted kick), 7:57. Bobcats 41–23. Drive: 5 plays, 60 yards, 3:05.
- MTST – Bryce Grebe 40-yard interception return (Myles Sansted kick), 7:01. Bobcats 48–23.

Statistics	MONT	MTST
First downs	18	23
Plays–yards	67–347	63–449
Rushes–yards	25–96	44–240
Passing yards	251	209
Passing: Comp–Att–Int	27–42–1	13–19–0
Turnovers	1	1
Time of possession	28:17	31:43

Team	Category	Player	Statistics
Montana	Passing	Keali'i Ah Yat	27/42, 251 yards, TD, INT
Montana	Rushing	Eli Gillman	16 carries, 106 yards, TD
Montana	Receiving	Michael Wortham	8 receptions, 85 yards
Montana State	Passing	Justin Lamson	13/19, 209 yards, 2 TD
Montana State	Rushing	Adam Jones	16 carries, 131 yards, 2 TD
Montana State	Receiving	Taco Dowler	5 receptions, 125 yards, TD

=== Vs. No. 17т Illinois State (Division I Football Championship Game) ===
2026 NCAA Division I Football Championship Game
No. 17т Illinois State Redbirds (12–4) vs. No. 2 (2) Montana State Bobcats (13–2) – Game summary

Quarter	1	2	3	4	OT	Total
No. 17т Redbirds	0	7	7	14	6	34
No. 2 (2) Bobcats	7	14	7	0	7	35

at FirstBank Stadium • Nashville, Tennessee

- Date: January 5, 2026
- Game time: 5:30 p.m. MST / 7:30 p.m. EST
- Game weather: Clear • Temperature: 57 °F (14 °C) • Wind: S at 7 miles per hour (11 km/h)
- Game attendance: 24,105
- Referee: James Brookhart
- TV announcers (ESPN): Dave Flemming (play by play), Brock Osweiler (analyst) and Stormy Buonantony (sideline reporter)

Game information

First quarter

- MTST – Justin Lamson 3-yard run (Myles Sansted kick), 4:51. Bobcats 7–0. Drive: 10 plays, 90 yards, 5:50.

Second quarter

- MTST – Justin Lamson 2-yard run (Myles Sansted kick), 10:49. Bobcats 14–0. Drive: 8 plays, 80 yards, 3:26.
- ILST – Scotty Presson Jr. 6-yard pass from Tommy Rittenhouse (Michael Cosentino kick), 0:54. Bobcats 14–7. Drive: 10 plays, 80 yards, 4:23.
- MTST – Dane Steel 33-yard pass from Justin Lamson (Myles Sansted kick), 0:18. Bobcats 21–7. Drive: 3 plays, 75 yards, 0:36.

Third quarter

- ILST – Logan Brasfield 1-yard run (Michael Consentino kick), 5:32. Bobcats 21–14. Drive: 17 plays, 85 yards, 7:32.
- MTST – Taco Dowler 22-yard run (Myles Sansted kick), 3:18. Bobcats 28–14. Drive: 6 plays, 64 yards, 2:08.

Fourth quarter

- ILST – Daniel Sobkowicz 4-yard pass from Tommy Rittenhouse (Michael Cosentino kick), 10:13. Bobcats 28–21. Drive: 15 plays, 81 yards, 8:01.
- ILST – Dylan Lord 25-yard pass from Tommy Rittenhouse (Michael Cosentino kick), 5:10. Tied 28–28. Drive: 8 plays, 60 yards, 3:52.

Overtime

- ILST – Dylan Lord 10-yard pass from Tommy Rittenhouse (kick blocked). Redbirds 34–28. Drive: 2 plays, 25 yards.
- MTST – Taco Dowler 14-yard pass from Justin Lamson (Myles Sansted kick). Bobcats 35–34. Drive: 5 plays, 25 yards.

Statistics	ILST	MTST
First downs	33	20
Plays–yards	71–471	51–381
Rushes–yards	38–160	24–101
Passing yards	311	280
Passing: Comp–Att–Int	33–46–0	18–27–0
Turnovers	0	0
Time of possession	39:41	20:19

Team	Category	Player	Statistics
Illinois State	Passing	Tommy Rittenhouse	33/46, 311 yards, 4 TD
Illinois State	Rushing	Victor Dawson	29 carries, 126 yards
Illinois State	Receiving	Dylan Lord	13 receptions, 161 yards, 2 TD
Montana State	Passing	Justin Lamson	18/27, 280 yards, 2 TD
Montana State	Rushing	Adam Jones	5 carries, 46 yards
Montana State	Receiving	Taco Dowler	8 receptions, 111 yards, TD

== Ranking movements ==
Ranking movements Legend: ██ Increase in ranking ██ Decrease in ranking т = Tied with team above or below ( ) = First-place votes
	Week														
Poll	Pre	1	2	3	4	5	6	7	8	9	10	11	12	13	Final
STATS FCS	2 (1)	3 (1)	4	4	4	5	5	5	5	4т	3	3 (1)	3	2	1 (56)
Coaches	2	3т	6	6т	6	5	5	5	5	4	3	3	3	2 (1)	1 (21)

== Roster ==
2025 Montana State Bobcats football team roster
Players
Coaches
Offense

Pos.	#	Name	Class
WR	1	Chris Long	Sr
RB	3	Jared White	Jr
WR	4	Jacob Trimble	Jr
WR	5	Javonte King	So
QB	6	River Warren	Fr
QB	8	Justin Lamson	Sr
WR	9	Ryan King	Sr
WR	10	Jabez Woods	Fr
WR	11	Maxwell Hendrick	Fr
WR	12	Jordan Reed	Jr
QB	13	Chance Wilson	So
WR	14	Taco Dowler	Jr
QB	15	Patrick Duchien	So
QB	17	Grant Vigen	Fr
WR	18	Parker Mady	Fr
WR	19	Tom Carter	So
WR	20	Kee Christiansen	Fr
RB	22	Shanko Kornachuk	Fr
RB	23	Adam Jones	So
RB	25	Cale Breslin	Fr
RB	26	Malachi Claunch	Fr
RB	28	Colson Coon	So
RB	32	Julius Davis	Sr
TE	35	Tommy Springman	Fr
RB	47	George Helms	Fr
OL	51	Dalton Noble	Fr
OL	53	Nicholas Maloff	Fr
C, G	54	Zac Nyland	So
G	55	J. T. Reed	Sr
OL	56	Samora Ezekiel	Jr
OL	57	Everett Carr	So
OL	60	Tommy Nilson	So
OL	61	Aiden Kaplan	Fr
OL	63	Dylan Rollins	So
OL	64	Burke Mastel	So
OL	65	Vaughn Wirkus	Fr
OT	66	Titan Fleischmann	Jr
OL	68	Nate Thornton	Fr
OL	72	Braden Zimmer	Fr
OL	73	Cedric Jefferson	So
OL	75	Ben Winters	Fr
OL	79	Jonathan Luhmann	So
TE	80	Luvens Valcin	Fr
TE	81	Carter Cocke	Fr
TE	82	Luke Smith	So
WR	83	Kash Embry	Fr
WR	84	Dane Steel	Fr
TE	85	Carter Curnow	Fr
TE	86	Hunter Provience	So
TE	87	Thomas Buchanan	Fr
TE	88	Rylan Schlepp	So
TE	89	Rocky Lencioni	Fr

Defense

Pos.	#	Name	Class
DB	0	Takhari Carr	Jr
DB	1	Jhase McMillan	Fr
DB	2	Taki Uluilakepa	So
DB	3	Kory Boyd	Fr
S, NB	5	Caden Dowler	Jr
DB	6	Bryant Meredith	So
DB	7	Tayden Gray	So
DB	8	Carson Williams	Fr
DB	9	Seth Johnson	Fr
LB	10	Bryce Grebe	So
DE	11	Kenneth Eiden IV	Sr
LB	12	Ryan Bowles	Fr
CB	13	Jackson Harmon	Sr
DB	15	Ife Ohalete	Jr
DB	16	Brendon Ross	Fr
DB	17	Hayden Gunlock	Fr
DB	18	Tim Thomas II	Fr
LB	19	Neil Daily	Jr
CB	22	Marcus Coleman II	Fr
DB	24	Colter Petre	So
DB	25	Luke Oxarart	Fr
LB	27	Brock Steel	Jr
DB	29	JJ Dolan	So
LB	31	Vinnie Souza	Fr
LB	33	Mason Dethman	Fr
LB	34	Cole Taylor	So
DE	36	Zac Crews	Jr
LB	37	Josh Woodberry	Fr
DT	41	Paul Brott	Sr
LB	42	Ryan Krahe	Jr
LB	43	Xavier Ahrens	Fr
DE	44	Jake Vigen	Jr
DE	45	Hunter Parsons	Sr
DE	46	Logan Fredericksen	So
DE	48	Blaine Downing	Fr
LB	49	Zac Waible	So
DT	50	Zack Black	Jr
DT	55	AJ Tanupo	Fr
DE	58	Dominic Solano	So
DT	69	Jaren Perkins	Jr
DT	90	Hunter Sharbono	So
DE	91	Seth Brock	Fr
DT	92	Graysen Schneider	Fr
DT	94	Josaiah Asuega	Fr
DE	96	Major Thornhill	Fr
DT	97	Alec Eckert	Sr
DL	98	Hudson Wiens	Fr
DL	99	Talon Marsh	So

Special teams

Pos.	#	Name	Class
P	30	Colby Frokjer	Fr
K	38	Michael Rubich	Fr
K	39	Myles Sansted	So
LS	40	Brody Johnson	Fr

Head coach

- Brent Vigen

Coordinators/assistant coaches

- Shawn Howe (Defensive coordinator)
- Pete Sterbick (Offensive coordinator / quarterbacks)
- Marcus Monaco (special teams coordinator / director of football video)
- Jody Owens (linebackers / assistant head coach)
- Nicolas Jean-Baptiste (defensive line)
- Sam Mix (wide receivers)
- Bryan Shepherd (safeties / pass game coordinator)
- Matt Smith (offensive line)
- Jordan Walsh (tight ends)
- Josh Firm (running backs)
- Trenton Greene (cornerbacks)
- Jerry Anderson JR (director of football administration)
- Chandler Arbizzani (general manager)
- Jake Dusenbury (assistant defensive line)
- Jesse Moser (assistant offensive line)
- Sean Chambers (assistant wide receivers)
- Kiante Goudeau (assistant defensive backs)
- Derek Griebel (assistant special teams)

Legend

- (C) Team captain
- (S) Suspended
- (I) Ineligible
- Injured
- Redshirt

Roster
Last update: August 24, 2025
