= Charles Demmings =

American football player (born 2003)

No. 20 – Minnesota Vikings
- Position: Cornerback
- Roster status: Active

Personal information
- Born: April 5, 2003 (age 23); Mesquite, Texas, U.S.
- Listed height: 6 ft 1 in (1.85 m)
- Listed weight: 193 lb (88 kg)

Career information
- High school: John Horn (Mesquite, Texas)
- College: Stephen F. Austin (2021–2025)
- NFL draft: 2026: 5th round, 163rd overall pick

Career history
- Minnesota Vikings (2026–present)

Awards and highlights
- First-team FCS All-American (2025); First-team All-Southland (2025)
- Stats at Pro Football Reference

Charles "Chuck" Demmings (born April 5, 2003) is an American professional football cornerback for the Minnesota Vikings of the National Football League (NFL). He played college football for the Stephen F. Austin Lumberjacks and he was selected by the Vikings in the fifth round of the 2026 NFL draft.

== Early life ==
Demmings attended John Horn High School in Mesquite, Texas. He only played one year of high school football, tallying 39 tackles with two being for a loss, four interceptions, five pass deflections, one forced fumble and a blocked field goal as a senior. Demmings committed to play college football for the Stephen F. Austin Lumberjacks.

== College career ==
Heading into his senior season, Demmings was named a team captain. He had a breakout season in 2025, where he notched 18 tackles, five pass deflections, and four interceptions. Demmings finished his career appearing in 42 games, totaling 63 tackles with two being for a loss, a program record 35 pass deflections, and nine interceptions. He also earned first-team FCS all-American honors and first-team all-Southland honors in 2025. After the conclusion of the season he declared for the 2026 NFL draft, accepting an invite to participate in the 2026 Senior Bowl.

== Professional career ==
Pre-draft measurables
Height	Weight	Arm length	Hand span	Wingspan	40-yard dash	10-yard split	20-yard split	20-yard shuttle	Three-cone drill	Vertical jump	Broad jump	Bench press
6 ft 1 1/8 in (1.86 m)	193 lb (88 kg)	32 in (0.81 m)	10 1/8 in (0.26 m)	6 ft 5 3/4 in (1.97 m)	4.41 s	1.55 s	2.58 s	4.25 s	7.28 s	42.0 in (1.07 m)	11 ft 0 in (3.35 m)	13 reps
All values from NFL Combine/Pro Day

Demmings was selected by the Minnesota Vikings in the fifth round with the 163rd overall pick of the 2026 NFL draft.

== Personal life ==
Demmings is a Christian, citing April 14, 2022, as the day he 'surrendered his life to Christ'. In a virtual interview with Twin Cities media members, Demmings said "My passion and my 'why' is to hear God and express His heartbeat in every day".
