= Titan Fleischmann =

American football player

No. 66 – Montana State Bobcats
- Position: Offensive tackle

Personal information
- Listed height: 6 ft 4 in (1.93 m)
- Listed weight: 300 lb (136 kg)

Career information
- High school: Century (Pocatello, Idaho)
- College: Montana State (2021–present)

Awards and highlights
- FCS national champion (2025); FCS Third-team All-American (2024); First-team All-Big Sky (2025); Second-team All-Big Sky (2024)

Titan Fleischmann is an American college football offensive tackle for the Montana State Bobcats.

== Early life ==
Fleischmann attended Century High School in Pocatello, Idaho, where he was a four-year starter, three-time team captain, and three-time all-conference honoree in football. He was teammates with his younger brother, Bruin, while their father, Ryan, served as offensive line coach. Fleischmann played tight end for the first three years before being moved to offensive tackle. As a senior, he earned first-team all-state honors from SBLive.com after leading an offensive line which surrendered only three sacks all year long. Fleischmann also posted 27 tackles and two sacks as a defensive lineman. Outside of football, he was a two-time captain on the basketball team.

=== Recruiting ===
Fleischmann was rated as a three-star recruit and the third-best player in the state of Idaho, according to 247Sports. He received heavy interest from Montana State University (MSU), but his recruitment was slowed down by the COVID-19 pandemic, which restricted in-person contact. In June 2020, Fleischmann and his father made the four-hour drive to the MSU campus in Bozeman, Montana. During the visit, Fleischmann committed to playing college football for the Bobcats while standing in the Bobcat Stadium parking lot and FaceTiming his coaches, who then cheered from their office windows. He had also received an offer from Idaho State. Fleischmann signed with the Bobcats on National Signing Day in December. "Titan is an awesome kid, and when you have a guy with the athleticism of a tight end and the body of a tackle you have someone who's going to be a really good player", said then-Montana State head coach Jeff Choate.

== College career ==
Fleischmann, who had hurt both of his shoulder labrums in high school, underwent a pair of surgeries to repair his shoulders after arriving at MSU in 2021, taking a redshirt in his first season. After a year of rehab, he appeared in two games in 2022 as a reserve. Fleischmann entered the 2023 campaign as the backup left tackle on the depth chart, and played the first five games of the season before it was determined he needed knee surgery, sidelining him once again. He recovered in time for spring practice the following year and was named the starting right tackle ahead of the 2024 season opener against New Mexico, which marked his first career start. Fleischmann went on to start all 16 games at right tackle, allowing one sack, one quarterback hit, and eight hurries as he helped the Bobcats reach the FCS national championship game. He was named a second-team all-Big Sky honoree, as well as a third-team FCS All-American selection by SI.com.

Fleischmann was named a team captain ahead of the 2025 season. He was the only full-time returning starter on the offensive line. Fleischmann earned first-team all-Big Sky honors.

== Personal life ==
Fleischmann comes from an athletic family. He was the first of four children born to Ryan and Meg (née Salness) Fleischmann, who played football and basketball, respectively, at Idaho State University. All three of his mother's sisters played sports at the Naval Academy. His maternal grandfather, Ty Salness, was teammates with O. J. Simpson on the national champion 1967 USC Trojans football team; Ty's paternal grandparents immigrated from Norway. Fleischmann's younger brother, Bruin, plays football at the Air Force Academy.

Fleischmann's given name, Titan, is a play on his grandfather Ty's name. However, his grandmother cried upon learning her future grandson's name because she feared he would be bullied for it. "Fortunately for him, he ended up being big", joked his father. "It would be a hard handle if you're the smallest kid on the team."
