= 2026 NCAA Division I Football Championship Game =

Postseason college football game

2026 NCAA Division I Football Championship
- FCS National Championship Game
Illinois State Redbirds	Montana State Bobcats
(12–4)	(13–2)
Missouri Valley	Big Sky
34	35
Head coach: Brock Spack	Head coach: Brent Vigen
STATS / Seed; T17 / —	STATS / Seed; 2 / 2
	1	2	3	4	OT	Total
Illinois State	0	7	7	14	6	34
Montana State	7	14	7	0	7	35
- Date: January 5, 2026
- Season: 2025
- Stadium: FirstBank Stadium
- Location: Nashville, Tennessee
- MVP: Justin Lamson (QB, Montana State)
- Favorite: Montana State by 10.5 points
- Referee: James Brookhart
- Attendance: 24,105

United States TV coverage
- Network: ESPN, ESPN+
- Announcers: Dave Flemming (play by play), Brock Osweiler (analyst) and Stormy Buonantony (sideline reporter)

International TV coverage
- Network: Canada: TSN2/TSN+

The 2026 NCAA Division I Football Championship Game was a college football game played on January 5, 2026, at FirstBank Stadium in Nashville, Tennessee. The game determined the national champion of the NCAA Division I Football Championship Subdivision (FCS) for the 2025 season. It featured the two finalists of the 24-team playoff bracket, which began on November 29, 2025. The Monday night game began at approximately 7:30 p.m. EST and was broadcast on ESPN and ESPN+.

The game featured Illinois State of the Missouri Valley Football Conference and Montana State of the Big Sky Conference; for the first time ever, the FCS Championship Game ended in overtime, with Montana State defeating Illinois State, 35–34.

== Teams ==
=== Illinois State ===
Illinois State got off to a 3–1 start in non-conference play, losing only to FBS opponent Oklahoma. They began Missouri Valley Football Conference play with a home game versus No. 1 North Dakota State and were trounced 33–16. A loss to Youngstown State two weeks later saw them drop to No. 18 in the polls but the Redbirds responded with victories over No. 21 South Dakota and No. 16 South Dakota State before closing out the regular season with a loss to No. 24 Southern Illinois. With a conference record of 5–3 and finishing 8–4 overall, the Redbirds were among the last teams to get into the FCS playoffs, being one of six MVFC teams in the bracket but were also unseeded. They defeated No. 17 Southeastern Louisiana 21–3 to set up a matchup with No. 1 North Dakota State. They pulled off a last-minute upset to win 29–28 and reach the quarterfinals. They then defeated No. 11 UC Davis 42–31 and then beat No. 9 Villanova 30–14 (the largest semifinal win by a road team in the last 30 years) to reach the championship game. They are the first FCS team to win four straight playoff games on the road.

This was the 15th consecutive FCS championship game with a team from the Missouri Valley Football Conference. Illinois State's last championship appearance came in 2014 when they lost to North Dakota State 29–27. They were attempting to win their first Division I championship as a program and were also attempting to become the first unseeded team to win the FCS championship since Western Kentucky in 2002.

=== Montana State ===
Ranked No. 4 in the polls to start the year, Montana State got off to a rough start for the season, losing 59–13 to FBS opponent Oregon before falling to No. 2 South Dakota State 30–24 in double overtime. However, the Bobcats did not lose another game for the rest of the regular season, winning nine games in a row to set up a pivotal matchup for the Big Sky championship versus in-state rival Montana; with Montana State ranked No. 3 and Montana ranked No. 2, it was the first top-3 matchup in rivalry history. Playing on the road, the Bobcats won 31–28. Both teams received a first round bye, with Montana State being ranked No. 2 only to North Dakota State. The Bobcats defeated No. 24 Yale 21–13, No. 10 Stephen F. Austin 44–28 to set up the first-ever December rivalry game with No. 3 Montana. They trounced them 48–23 to reach the FCS championship game.

This was the third FCS championship game for Montana State in the past six seasons, as they previously lost to North Dakota State in 2021 and 2024. The most recent time that Montana State won the FCS title had been in 1984 against Louisiana Tech with a 19–6 win in Charleston, South Carolina, while the most recent Big Sky team to win the national championship had been Eastern Washington in 2010.

== Game summary ==
2026 NCAA Division I Football Championship Game

Quarter	1	2	3	4	OT	Total
No. 17 Illinois State	0	7	7	14	6	34
(2) No. 2 Montana State	7	14	7	0	7	35

at FirstBank Stadium • Nashville, Tennessee

- Date: Monday, January 5, 2026
- Game time: 7:30 p.m. EST
- Game weather: Clear • Temperature: 57 °F (14 °C) • Wind: 7 mph (11 km/h) south
- Game attendance: 24,105
- Referee: James Brookhart
- TV announcers (ESPN): Dave Flemming (play-by-play), Brock Osweiler (analyst), Stormy Buonantony (sideline reporter)
- Box score

Scoring summary

Quarter	Time	Drive			Team	Scoring information	Score	
Quarter	Time	Plays	Yards	TOP	Team	Scoring information	Illinois State	Montana State
1	4:51	10	90	5:50	Montana State	Justin Lamson 3-yard touchdown run, Myles Sansted kick good	0	7
2	10:49	8	80	3:26	Montana State	Justin Lamson 2-yard touchdown run, Myles Sansted kick good	0	14
2	0:54	10	80	4:23	Illinois State	Scotty Presson Jr. 6-yard touchdown reception from Tommy Rittenhouse, Michael Cosentino kick good	7	14
2	0:18	3	75	0:36	Montana State	Dane Steel 33-yard touchdown reception from Justin Lamson, Myles Sansted kick good	7	21
3	5:32	17	85	7:32	Illinois State	Logan Brasfield 0-yard touchdown run, Michael Cosentino kick good	14	21
3	3:18	6	64	2:08	Montana State	Taco Dowler 22-yard touchdown run, Myles Sansted kick good	14	28
4	10:13	15	81	8:01	Illinois State	Daniel Sobkowicz 4-yard touchdown reception from Tommy Rittenhouse, Michael Cosentino kick good	21	28
4	5:10	8	60	3:52	Illinois State	Dylan Lord 25-yard touchdown reception from Tommy Rittenhouse, Michael Cosentino kick good	28	28
OT		2	25		Illinois State	Dylan Lord 10-yard touchdown reception from Tommy Rittenhouse, Michael Cosentino kick failed (blocked)	34	28
OT		5	25		Montana State	Taco Dowler 14-yard touchdown reception from Justin Lamson, Myles Sansted kick good	34	35
"TOP" = time of possession. For other American football terms, see Glossary of American football.							34	35

== Statistics ==
Team statistical comparison
Statistic	Illinois State	Montana State
First downs	33	20
First downs rushing	10	7
First downs passing	20	12
First downs penalty	0	2
Third down efficiency	7–14	3–9
Fourth down efficiency	2–2	1–1
Total plays–net yards	84–471	51–381
Rushing attempts–net yards	38–160	24–101
Yards per rush	4.2	4.2
Yards passing	311	280
Pass completions–attempts (percent)	33–46 (72%)	18–27 (67%)
Interceptions thrown	0	0
Punt returns–total yards	2–-1	0–0
Kickoff returns–total yards	4–70	4–114
Punts–average yardage	4–40.0	5–39.2
Fumbles–lost	1–0	1–0
Penalties–yards	5–55	14–93
Time of possession	39:41	20:19

Illinois State statistics
Redbirds passing
	C–A	Yds	TD–INT
Tommy Rittenhouse	33–46	311	4–0
Redbirds rushing
	Car	Yds	TD
Victor Dawson	29	126	0
Tommy Rittenhouse	6	20	0
Seth Glatz	2	13	0
Wenkers Wright	1	1	0
Redbirds receiving
	Rec	Yds	TD
Dylan Lord	13	161	2
Daniel Sobkowicz	5	52	1
Victor Dawson	5	33	0
Eddie Kasper	3	16	0
Javon Charles	2	18	0
Scotty Presson Jr.	2	16	0
Luke Mailander	1	12	0
Wenkers Wright	1	5	0
Seth Glatz	1	-2	0

Montana State statistics
Bobcats passing
	C–A	Yds	TD–INT
Justin Lamson	18–27	280	2–0
Bobcats rushing
	Car	Yds	TD
Adam Jones	5	46	0
Justin Lamson	12	30	2
Julius Davis	5	23	0
Taco Dowler	1	22	1
Bobcats receiving
	Rec	Yds	TD
Taco Dowler	8	111	1
Adam Jones	3	16	
Chris Long	2	55	0
Jabez Woods	2	41	0
Dane Steel	2	41	1
Rocky Lencioni	1	16	0
