= Brent Vigen =

American football player and coach (born 1975)

Current position
- Title: Head coach
- Team: Montana State
- Conference: Big Sky
- Record: 72–13

Biographical details
- Born: March 19, 1975 (age 51); Buxton, North Dakota, U.S.

Playing career
- 1993–1997: North Dakota State
- Position: Tight end

Coaching career (HC unless noted)
- 1998–2000: North Dakota State (GA)
- 2001: North Dakota State (TE)
- 2002: North Dakota State (QB)
- 2003: North Dakota State (RB)
- 2004–2008: North Dakota State (PGC/QB)
- 2009–2013: North Dakota State (OC/QB)
- 2014–2016: Wyoming (OC/QB)
- 2017–2020: Wyoming (AHC/OC/QB)
- 2021–present: Montana State

Head coaching record
- Overall: 72–13
- Tournaments: 12–3 (NCAA D-I playoffs)

Accomplishments and honors

Championships
- NCAA Division I FCS (2025); 4 Big Sky (2022, 2024–2026)

Awards
- Eddie Robinson Award (2024)

Brent Erick Vigen (born March 19, 1975) is an American football coach and former player. Vigen is currently the head coach for the Montana State Bobcats. He was previously the associate head coach and offensive coordinator at the University of Wyoming. He has spent the majority of his coaching career on Craig Bohl's staffs.

== Playing career ==
Vigen was a member of three NCAA Division II playoff teams (1994, 1995, and 1997) during his career at North Dakota State from 1993 through 1997. He played tight end and was a two-year starter.

== Coaching career ==
=== North Dakota State ===
Following his playing career, Vigen joined the coaching staff at North Dakota State as a graduate assistant for Bob Babich from 1998 to 2000. In 2001, he was promoted to a full-time position, coaching the tight ends in 2001 and the quarterbacks in 2002. New head coach Craig Bohl assigned Vigen as the running backs coach for the 2003 season, before promoting him to passing game coordinator and quarterbacks coach from 2004 to 2008. Prior to the 2009 season, Vigen was again promoted, this time to offensive coordinator. Vigen remained in this role through the 2013 season, when he followed Bohl to a new opportunity.

=== Wyoming ===
When Bohl was hired as the new head coach at Wyoming, Vigen went with him as Bohl's offensive coordinator and quarterbacks coach. In the spring of 2017, Vigen was promoted to associate head coach.

When North Dakota State head coach Chris Klieman left to become the head coach at Kansas State, Vigen was widely considered a candidate to replace Klieman as the head coach at North Dakota State, but ultimately he remained at Wyoming, and North Dakota State's defensive coordinator, Matt Entz, was promoted.

=== Montana State ===
In February 2021, Vigen got his first head coaching job as the head coach at Montana State, replacing Jeff Choate. He won the 2024 Eddie Robinson Award as national coach of the year, and has led Montana State to Big Sky Championships in 2022, 2024 and 2025. The Bobcats beat Illinois State in 35–34 in overtime on January 5, 2026, to win the 2025 FCS Championship. Due to this historic victory where after 41 years MSU won a national title, Vigen was awarded over $180,000 US dollars in bonuses (about two thirds of his base salary).

== Head coaching record ==
Year	Team	Overall	Conference	Standing	Bowl/playoffs	STATS^{#}	Coaches^{°}
Montana State Bobcats (Big Sky Conference) (2021–present)
2021	Montana State	12–3	7–1	2nd	L NCAA Division I Championship	2	2
2022	Montana State	12–2	8–0	T–1st	L NCAA Division I Semifinal	4	5
2023	Montana State	8–4	6–2	T–2nd	L NCAA Division I Second Round	8	9
2024	Montana State	15–1	8–0	1st	L NCAA Division I Championship	2	2
2025	Montana State	14–2	8–0	1st	W NCAA Division I Championship	1	1
2026	Montana State	11–1	8–1	1st			
Montana State:		72–13	45–4				
Total:		72–13					
National championship Conference title Conference division title or championship game berth

== Personal life ==
Vigen and his wife, Molly, have three sons: Jake, Grant, and Luke. Molly played basketball at North Dakota State and was a member of the 1996 NCAA Division II National Championship team. Jake and Grant were members of the 2025 Montana State FCS National Championship football team.
