= Taco Dowler =

American football player (born 2003)

No. 14 – Montana State Bobcats
- Position: Wide receiver
- Class: Junior

Personal information
- Born: June 28, 2003 (age 23)
- Listed height: 5 ft 9 in (1.75 m)
- Listed weight: 170 lb (77 kg)

Career information
- High school: Billings West (Billings, Montana)
- College: Montana State (2022–present)

Awards and highlights
- FCS national champion (2026); First-team All-Big Sky (2025)
- Stats at ESPN

McLean "Taco" Dowler (born June 28, 2003) is an American college football wide receiver for the Montana State Bobcats. He is the twin brother of Caden Dowler, a defensive back for the Bobcats.

== Early life ==
McLean Dowler was born in 2003 to Justin and Michelle Dowler, along with his twin brother, Caden Dowler; McLean is younger by one minute. At the age of two, the twins were nicknamed "Burrito" and "Taco", though Caden's nickname only stuck "for like six months" while McLean Dowler's nickname carried on into adulthood.

Dowler has not confirmed exactly how he was given the nickname "Taco". Local media outlets suspect one of two stories: Dowler either supposedly earned the nickname "Taco" after a younger him was in a Taco Bell drive-thru with his family when he blurted out, "That's my name", or a young Dowler was sitting at a table one morning and simply stated, "My name is Taco", and then got angry at anyone who called him by McLean instead of Taco.

== Career ==
Dowler attended Billings West High School with his brother in Billings, Montana. He broke numerous school records and was named the Montana Gatorade Player of the Year. Dowler committed to Montana State in 2021 and began attending the Montana State University in 2022. He was ranked as the third-best in the state of Montana in the class of 2022, according to 247Sports.

On January 5, 2026, Dowler and the Montana State Bobcats won the 2026 NCAA Division I Football Championship Game 35–34 in overtime; in the game, Dowler had 8 receptions, 111 receiving yards, and the game-winning receiving touchdown in overtime.
