= NCAA Division I Football Championship =

Annual post-season college football game

- Stadium: FirstBank Stadium (2026–present)
- Location: Nashville, Tennessee (2026–present)
- Previous stadiums: Toyota Stadium (2010–2025); Finley Stadium (1997–2009); Marshall University Stadium (1992–1996) various (1978–1991)
- Previous locations: Frisco, Texas (2010–2025); Chattanooga, Tennessee (1997–2009); Huntington, West Virginia (1992–1996) various (1978–1991)
- Operated: 2006–present
- Preceded by: NCAA Division I-AA Football Championship (1978–2005)

2025 season matchup
- Illinois State vs. Montana State
- (Montana State 35–34^{OT})

The NCAA Division I Football Championship is an annual post-season college football game, played since 2006, used to determine a national champion of the NCAA Division I Football Championship Subdivision (FCS). From 1978 to 2005, the game was called the NCAA Division I-AA Football Championship, during the period when the FCS was known as NCAA Division I-AA.

The game serves as the final match of an annual postseason bracket tournament between top teams in FCS. Since 2013, 24 teams normally participate in the tournament, with some teams receiving automatic bids upon winning their conference championship, and other teams determined by a selection committee. The reigning national champions are the Montana State Bobcats, winners of the January 2026 championship game.

The FCS is the highest division in college football to hold a playoff tournament sanctioned by the NCAA to determine its champion, as the College Football Playoff currently used by the Football Bowl Subdivision (FBS) is not NCAA-sanctioned.

== History ==
=== Playoff format ===
In the inaugural season of Division I-AA, the 1978 postseason included just four teams; three regional champions (East, West, and South) plus an at-large selection. The field doubled to eight teams in 1981, with champions of five conferences—Big Sky, Mid-Eastern, Ohio Valley, Southwestern, and Yankee—receiving automatic bids. The top four teams were seeded, and then matched against the four remaining teams based on geographical proximity. The tournament was expanded to 12 teams in 1982, with each of the top four seeds receiving a first-round bye and a home game in the quarterfinals. Champions of the Southern and Southland conferences also received automatic bids.

The number of automatic bids has varied over time, due to changes in the number and size of conferences, with an automatic bid typically granted only to champions of conferences with at least six teams. Initially, the tournament was played in December; since the expansion to twelve teams in 1982, earlier rounds have been held in late November.

The playoffs expanded to a 16-team format in 1986, requiring four postseason victories to win the title. Initially, only the top four teams were seeded, with other teams geographically placed in the bracket. From 1995 through 2000, all 16 teams were seeded, independent of geography. In 2001, the number of seeded teams was reduced to four, with the seeded teams assured of home games in early tournament rounds, and other teams once again placed in the bracket to minimize travel. Home team designation in games between unseeded teams is determined based on several factors, including attendance history and revenue potential.

In April 2008, the NCAA announced that the playoff field would expand to 20 teams in 2010, with the Big South and Northeast Conference earning automatic bids for the first time. That bracket structure included seeding of the top five teams. Twelve teams received first-round byes; the remaining eight teams played first-round games, with the four winners advancing to face the top four seeds.

The playoffs expanded to 24 teams beginning in 2013, with the champion of the Pioneer Football League receiving an automatic bid for the first time. The number of seeded teams was increased to eight, with the 16 unseeded teams playing in first-round games. The unseeded teams continue to be paired according to geographic proximity and then placed in the bracket according to geographic proximity to the top eight seeds. Teams cannot travel more than 400 miles via ground, and teams from the same conference that played each other during the regular season are not paired for first-round games. For the 2020 season, affected by the COVID-19 pandemic in the United States, the bracket was reduced to 16 teams. The bracket returned to 24 teams for the 2021 season.

The field is traditionally set the Sunday before Thanksgiving and play begins that weekend.

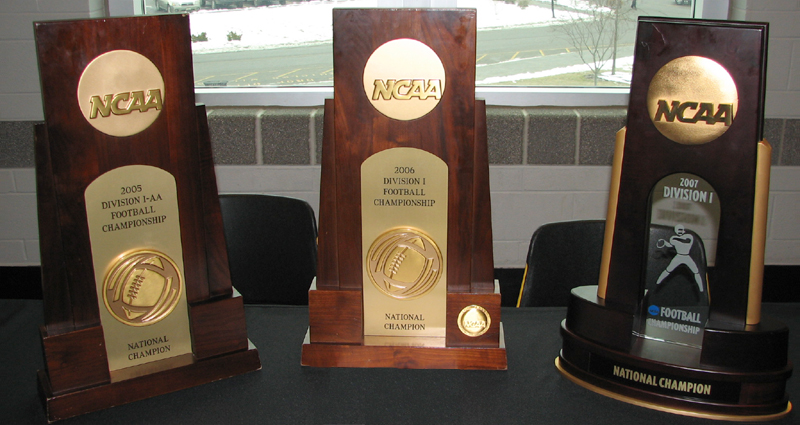
Appalachian State's National Championship trophies for 2005 (I-AA), 2006 (FCS), and 2007 (FCS)

Playoff format
Season(s)	Bracket size	Seeded teams	1st round byes
1978–1980	4	—	—
1981	8	4	—
1982–1985	12	4	4
1986–1994	16	4	—
1995–2000	16	16	—
2001–2009	16	4	—
2010–2012	20	5	12
2013–2019	24	8	8
2020	16	4	—
2021–2023	24	8	8
2024–present	24	16	8

==== Team selection ====
At-large selections and seeding within the bracket are determined by the FCS Playoff Selection Committee, which consists of one athletic director from each conference with an automatic bid. As of the 2018 season, there were 10 conferences with automatic bids and the selection committee made 14 at-large selections. An 11th automatic bid was added as of the 2021 season, reducing the number of at-large selections to 13. The number of automatic bids was reduced back to 10 in 2022 (due to the Big South Conference and Ohio Valley Conference, which both previously sent their champions, merging their football operations into the OVC–Big South Football Association), but restored to 11 in 2025 following the Ivy League's decision to enter the FCS Playoff for the first time.

=== Championship final ===
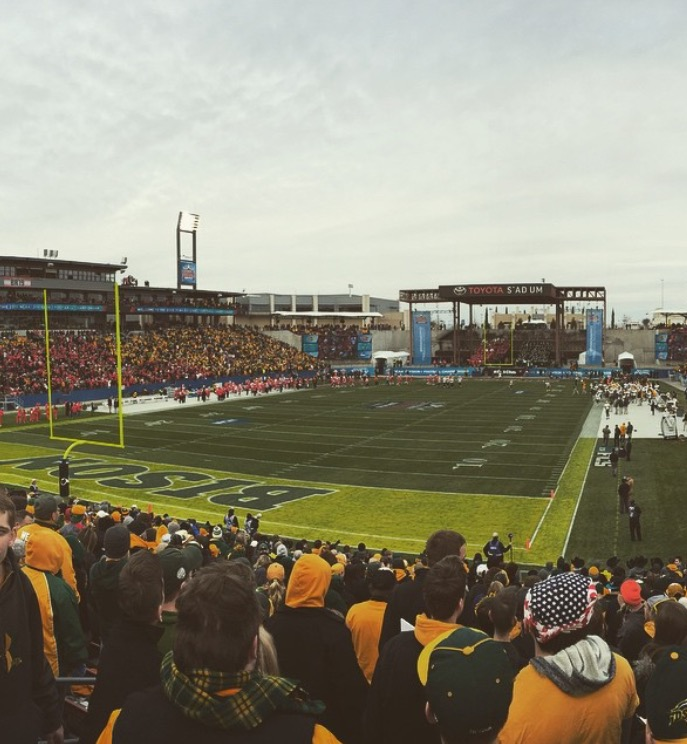
The January 2015 final between North Dakota State and Illinois State at Toyota Stadium

The tournament culminates with the national final, played between the two remaining teams from the playoff bracket. Unlike earlier round games in each year's playoff, which are played at campus sites, the title game is played at a site predetermined by the NCAA, akin to how the NFL predetermines the site for each Super Bowl. Originally played in December, with the 2010 expansion to a 20-team field, the final moved to January, with two or three weeks between the semifinals and final.

The inaugural title game was played in 1978 in Wichita Falls, Texas. The 1979 and 1980 games were held in Orlando, Florida, and Sacramento, California, respectively, and the game returned to Wichita Falls for 1981 and 1982. The games played in Wichita Falls were known as the Pioneer Bowl, while the game played in Sacramento was known as the Camellia Bowl—both names were used for various NCAA playoff games played in those locations, and were not specific to the I-AA championship. In 1983 and 1984, the game was played in Charleston, South Carolina. In 1985 and 1986, Tacoma, Washington, hosted the game, which the NCAA branded as the "Diamond Bowl".

The 1987 and 1988 games were played in Pocatello, Idaho; and from 1989 through 1991, in Statesboro, Georgia. The 1992 through 1996 games were held in Huntington, West Virginia; and from 1997 through 2009, the title game was played in Chattanooga, Tennessee.

From 2010 through the 2024 season, the title game was played in Frisco, Texas, a suburb north of Dallas, at Toyota Stadium, a multi-purpose stadium primarily used by FC Dallas of Major League Soccer. The stadium was known as Pizza Hut Park until the day after the final of the 2011 season, and then as FC Dallas Stadium until September 2013. The original contract with Frisco began in the 2010 season and ran through the 2012 season. The contract was extended three times; first through the 2015 season, then through the 2019 season, and finally through the 2024 season with an option for the 2025 season.

For at least 2026 and 2027, the title game will be played at FirstBank Stadium in Nashville, Tennessee, home of the Vanderbilt Commodores, due to renovations beginning at Toyota Stadium following the 2025 title game.

==== Details ====
Season(s)	Venue	Location	Tenant NCAA team (Note: at the time games were played)	Title games by tenant
1978	Memorial Stadium	Wichita Falls, Texas	none	N/A
1979	Orlando Stadium	Orlando, Florida	UCF Knights (D-III)	N/A
1980	Hughes Stadium	Sacramento, California	none	N/A
1981–1982	Memorial Stadium	Wichita Falls, Texas	none	N/A
1983–1984	Johnson Hagood Stadium	Charleston, South Carolina	The Citadel Bulldogs	none
1985–1986	Tacoma Dome	Tacoma, Washington	none	N/A
1987	Minidome (Note: Earlier name of the same venue.)	Pocatello, Idaho	Idaho State Bengals	none
1988	Holt Arena	Pocatello, Idaho	Idaho State Bengals	none
1989–1991	Paulson Stadium	Statesboro, Georgia	Georgia Southern Eagles	2: 1989, 1990
1992–1996	Marshall University Stadium	Huntington, West Virginia	Marshall Thundering Herd	4: 1992, 1993, 1995, 1996
1997–2009	Finley Stadium	Chattanooga, Tennessee	Chattanooga Mocs	none
2010–2011	Pizza Hut Park	Frisco, Texas	none	N/A
2012	FC Dallas Stadium	Frisco, Texas	none	N/A
2013–2025	Toyota Stadium	Frisco, Texas	none	N/A
2026–present	FirstBank Stadium	Nashville, Tennessee	Vanderbilt Commodores	N/A

Notes

There have been six instances where a team whose venue was predetermined to host the final game advanced to play for the championship on its own field. Georgia Southern won both title games it played at Paulson Stadium, while Marshall had a 2–2 record in four title games it played at Marshall University Stadium (now known as Joan C. Edwards Stadium).

=== Non-participants ===
As of the 2025 season, two FCS conferences usually do not participate in the tournament: the Mid-Eastern Athletic Conference (MEAC) and Southwestern Athletic Conference (SWAC). Since 2015, the champions of these two conferences, which consist of Historically Black Colleges and Universities (HBCU), play each other in the Celebration Bowl, the only active bowl game featuring FCS teams. MEAC gave up its automatic spot in the tournament prior to the 2015 season, while the SWAC's regular season extends through the Turkey Day Classic and Bayou Classic at the end of November and the SWAC Championship Game is played in December. Teams from the MEAC and SWAC may accept at-large bids, so long as they are not committed to other postseason games that would conflict with the tournament. The most recent MEAC and SWAC teams to accept bids were the 2023 North Carolina Central Eagles and 2021 Florida A&M Rattlers, respectively.

The Ivy League has been at the FCS level since 1982 and prohibits its members from awarding athletic scholarships in any sport; it plays a strict ten-game regular season. Through the 2024 season, it did not participate in any postseason football, citing academic concerns. The Student-Athlete Advisory Committee (consisting of student-athletes at all sports, including those who participated in the NCAA tournament in their respective sport) recommended the change be reversed, and on December 18, 2024, the Ivy League announced starting with the 2025 season, the league champion will participate in the tournament.

Historically, conferences in FCS that did not offer athletic scholarships were not granted automatic bids into the tournament and, although in theory were eligible for at-large bids, never received any. The last non-scholarship conference in the subdivision, the Pioneer Football League, now receives a tournament bid, which was initiated with the 2013 postseason.

=== FCS conferences ===
Membership numbers reflect the 2025 FCS season.

Conference	Nickname	Founded	Football members	Sports	Headquarters
Big Sky Conference	Big Sky	1963	12	15	Farmington, Utah
Big South Conference (Note: The Big South and Ohio Valley Conference effectively merged their football leagues in 2023. Both leagues share a single automatic playoff berth.)	Big South	1983	2	19	Charlotte, North Carolina
CAA Football (Note: CAA Football is administered by the multi-sports Coastal Athletic Association but is a separate legal entity.)	CAA	1946 (Note: Although CAA Football did not exist in its current form until 2007, it claims the football histories of the Yankee Conference (formed in 1946, played football from 1947 to 1995) and Atlantic 10 Conference (football from 1996 to 2006). It does not claim the history of the New England Conference (1938–1946), even though four of the six charter Yankee Conference members were NEC members in its final season.)	14	1	Richmond, Virginia
Ivy League (Note: The Ivy League abstained from the championship tournament and all postseason play until the end of the 2024 season. Starting in 2025, the Ivy League champion will participate in the NCAA tournament.)		1954	8	33	Princeton, New Jersey
Mid-Eastern Athletic Conference (Note: The MEAC champion, since 2015, forgoes its automatic bid to allow its champion to participate in the Celebration Bowl. Non-champions are eligible for at-large bids (an example being the 2016 North Carolina A&T Aggies football team, which now plays in CAA Football.).)	MEAC	1970	6	16	Norfolk, Virginia
Missouri Valley Football Conference	MVFC	1982	10	1	St. Louis, Missouri
Northeast Conference	NEC	1981	8	22	Somerset, New Jersey
Ohio Valley Conference	OVC	1948	7	18	Brentwood, Tennessee
Patriot League		1986	8	24	Center Valley, Pennsylvania
Pioneer Football League	PFL	1991	11	1	St. Louis, Missouri
Southern Conference	SoCon	1921	9	20	Spartanburg, South Carolina
Southland Conference	SLC	1963	10	17	Frisco, Texas
Southwestern Athletic Conference (Note: The SWAC abstains from the championship tournament to allow for a longer regular season, a conference final, and participation in the Celebration Bowl against the MEAC champion since 2015.)	SWAC	1920	12	18	Birmingham, Alabama
United Athletic Conference	UAC	2022 (Note: Formed in 2022 as a joint venture of the Atlantic Sun Conference and Western Athletic Conference football playing members; first season in 2023.)	9	1	Englewood, Colorado

== Champions ==
Current FCS members
Team	#	Seasons
Youngstown State	4	1991, 1993, 1994, 1997
Eastern Kentucky	2	1979, 1982
Montana	2	1995, 2001
South Dakota State	2	2022, 2023
Montana State	2	1984, 2025
Eastern Washington	1	2010
Florida A&M	1	1978
Furman	1	1988
Idaho State	1	1981
Richmond	1	2008
Southern Illinois	1	1983
Villanova	1	2009

Former FCS members
Team	#	Seasons
North Dakota State	10	2011, 2012, 2013, 2014, 2015, 2017, 2018, 2019, 2021, 2024
Georgia Southern	6	1985, 1986, 1989, 1990, 1999, 2000
Appalachian State	3	2005, 2006, 2007
Marshall	2	1992, 1996
James Madison	2	2004, 2016
Boise State	1	1980
Delaware	1	2003
Louisiana–Monroe	1	1987
Sam Houston	1	2020
UMass	1	1998
Western Kentucky	1	2002

Schools that have won the FCS Championship
10, 6, 4, 3, 2, 1

=== Championship game history ===
For each season since the inaugural year of Division I-AA play, 1978, the following table lists the date of each title game and the champion. The score and runner-up are also noted, along with the host city, game attendance, and head coach of the championship team.

Ed.	Season	Date	Champion	Score	Runner-up	Location	Attendance	Winning head coach
1	1978	December 16, 1978	Florida A&M	35–28	UMass	Wichita Falls, TX	13,604	Rudy Hubbard
2	1979	December 15, 1979	Eastern Kentucky	30–7	Lehigh	Orlando, FL	5,200	Roy Kidd
3	1980	December 20, 1980	Boise State	31–29	Eastern Kentucky	Sacramento, CA	8,157	Jim Criner
4	1981	December 19, 1981	Idaho State	34–23	Eastern Kentucky	Wichita Falls, TX	11,002	Dave Kragthorpe
5	1982	December 18, 1982	Eastern Kentucky (2)	17–14	Delaware	Wichita Falls, TX	11,257	Roy Kidd (2)
6	1983	December 17, 1983	Southern Illinois	43–7	Western Carolina	Charleston, SC	15,950	Rey Dempsey
7	1984	December 15, 1984	Montana State	19–6	Louisiana Tech	Charleston, SC	9,125	Dave Arnold
8	1985	December 21, 1985	Georgia Southern	44–42	Furman	Tacoma, WA	5,306	Erk Russell
9	1986	December 19, 1986	Georgia Southern (2)	48–21	Arkansas State	Tacoma, WA	4,419	Erk Russell (2)
10	1987	December 19, 1987	Northeast Louisiana	43–42	Marshall	Pocatello, ID	11,513	Pat Collins
11	1988	December 17, 1988	Furman	17–12	Georgia Southern	Pocatello, ID	9,714	Jimmy Satterfield
12	1989	December 16, 1989	Georgia Southern (3)	37–34	Stephen F. Austin	Statesboro, GA	25,725	Erk Russell (3)
13	1990	December 15, 1990	Georgia Southern (4)	36–13	Nevada	Statesboro, GA	23,204	Tim Stowers
14	1991	December 21, 1991	Youngstown State	25–17	Marshall	Statesboro, GA	12,667	Jim Tressel
15	1992	December 19, 1992	Marshall	31–28	Youngstown State	Huntington, WV	31,304	Jim Donnan
16	1993	December 18, 1993	Youngstown State (2)	17–5	Marshall	Huntington, WV	29,218	Jim Tressel (2)
17	1994	December 17, 1994	Youngstown State (3)	28–14	Boise State	Huntington, WV	27,674	Jim Tressel (3)
18	1995	December 16, 1995	Montana	22–20	Marshall	Huntington, WV	32,106	Don Read
19	1996	December 21, 1996	Marshall (2)	49–29	Montana	Huntington, WV	30,052	Bob Pruett
20	1997	December 20, 1997	Youngstown State (4)	10–9	McNeese State	Chattanooga, TN	14,771	Jim Tressel (4)
21	1998	December 19, 1998	UMass	55–43	Georgia Southern	Chattanooga, TN	17,501	Mark Whipple
22	1999	December 18, 1999	Georgia Southern (5)	59–24	Youngstown State	Chattanooga, TN	20,052	Paul Johnson
23	2000	December 16, 2000	Georgia Southern (6)	27–25	Montana	Chattanooga, TN	17,156	Paul Johnson (2)
24	2001	December 21, 2001	Montana (2)	13–6	Furman	Chattanooga, TN	12,698	Joe Glenn
25	2002	December 20, 2002	Western Kentucky	34–14	McNeese State	Chattanooga, TN	12,360	Jack Harbaugh
26	2003	December 19, 2003	Delaware	40–0	Colgate	Chattanooga, TN	14,281	K. C. Keeler
27	2004	December 17, 2004	James Madison	31–21	Montana	Chattanooga, TN	16,771	Mickey Matthews
28	2005	December 16, 2005	Appalachian State	21–16	Northern Iowa	Chattanooga, TN	20,236	Jerry Moore
29	2006	December 15, 2006	Appalachian State (2)	28–17	UMass	Chattanooga, TN	22,808	Jerry Moore (2)
30	2007	December 14, 2007	Appalachian State (3)	49–21	Delaware	Chattanooga, TN	23,010	Jerry Moore (3)
31	2008	December 19, 2008	Richmond	24–7	Montana	Chattanooga, TN	17,823	Mike London
32	2009	December 18, 2009	Villanova	23–21	Montana	Chattanooga, TN	14,328	Andy Talley
33	2010	January 7, 2011	Eastern Washington	20–19	Delaware	Frisco, TX	13,027	Beau Baldwin
34	2011	January 7, 2012	North Dakota State	17–6	Sam Houston State	Frisco, TX	20,586	Craig Bohl
35	2012	January 5, 2013	North Dakota State (2)	39–13	Sam Houston State	Frisco, TX	21,411	Craig Bohl (2)
36	2013	January 4, 2014	North Dakota State (3)	35–7	Towson	Frisco, TX	19,802	Craig Bohl (3)
37	2014	January 10, 2015	North Dakota State (4)	29–27	Illinois State	Frisco, TX	20,918	Chris Klieman
38	2015	January 9, 2016	North Dakota State (5)	37–10	Jacksonville State	Frisco, TX	21,836	Chris Klieman (2)
39	2016	January 7, 2017	James Madison (2)	28–14	Youngstown State	Frisco, TX	14,423	Mike Houston
40	2017	January 6, 2018	North Dakota State (6)	17–13	James Madison	Frisco, TX	19,090	Chris Klieman (3)
41	2018	January 5, 2019	North Dakota State (7)	38–24	Eastern Washington	Frisco, TX	17,802	Chris Klieman (4)
42	2019	January 11, 2020	North Dakota State (8)	28–20	James Madison	Frisco, TX	17,866	Matt Entz
43	2020	May 16, 2021	Sam Houston State	23–21	South Dakota State	Frisco, TX	7,840	K. C. Keeler (2)
44	2021	January 8, 2022	North Dakota State (9)	38–10	Montana State	Frisco, TX	18,942	Matt Entz (2)
45	2022	January 8, 2023	South Dakota State	45–21	North Dakota State	Frisco, TX	18,023	John Stiegelmeier
46	2023	January 7, 2024	South Dakota State (2)	23–3	Montana	Frisco, TX	19,512	Jimmy Rogers
47	2024	January 6, 2025	North Dakota State (10)	35–32	Montana State	Frisco, TX	18,005	Tim Polasek
48	2025	January 5, 2026	Montana State (2)	35–34 ^{(OT)}	Illinois State	Nashville, TN	24,105	Brent Vigen

Notes:

- 1987 champion Northeast Louisiana has been known as the University of Louisiana at Monroe (Louisiana–Monroe) since 1999.
- The 2020–21 school year was the first in which Sam Houston State University called its athletic program "Sam Houston", without the word "State".
- Attendance at the 2020 championship game (played in May 2021) was limited due to the COVID-19 pandemic.

== Appearances by team ==
Updated through the January 2026 championship game, following the 2025 football season. Conference affiliations reflect those for the upcoming 2026 season.

Key

- CH National champion
- RU National runner-up
- SF Semifinals
- QF Quarterfinals
- 12 16 Round of 12 (1982 through 1985), Round of 16 (1986 to present)
- ✖ First Round (2010 to present, except for 2020)

Beginning in 1981, the NCAA seeded the top 4 teams. This expanded to the top 5 in 2010, the top 8 in 2013, and the top 16 in 2024. In all of these years, the team's seed is shown in superscript next to the result.

School	Conference (as of 2026)	#	QF	SF	CG	CH	78	79	80	81	82	83	84	85	86	87	88	89	90	91	92	93	94	95	96	97	98	99	00	01	02	03	04	05	06	07	08	09	10	11	12	13	14	15	16	17	18	19	20	21	22	23	24	25
North Dakota State	FBS	16	15	13	11	10																																	QF	²CH	¹CH	¹CH	²CH	³CH	¹SF	²CH	¹CH	¹CH	QF	²CH	³RU	SF	²CH	¹16
Georgia Southern	FBS	19	17	13	8	6								CH	⁴CH	QF	²RU	¹CH	³CH			¹QF		QF		QF	¹RU	²CH	³CH	²SF	³SF		⁴16	16					SF	³SF	⁵SF													
Youngstown State	MVFC	14	9	8	7	4										16		QF	²16	CH	RU	CH	¹CH			CH		RU	16						⁴SF										RU							16		¹⁵✖
Appalachian State	FBS	20	12	6	3	3									16	¹SF		16		16	16		QF	²QF			QF	⁴16	SF	QF	16			²CH	¹CH	CH	²QF	SF	¹QF	16	16													
Montana	Big Sky	30	16	13	8	2					12						16	SF				²16	SF	CH	¹RU	16	16	16	¹RU	¹CH	QF	16	RU	16	²SF	³16	⁴RU	¹RU		⁴SF		⁸16	16	16				⁶QF		⁶QF	16	²RU	¹⁴16	³SF
Marshall	FBS	8	8	7	6	2										RU	QF			RU	CH	RU	²SF	RU	²CH																													
Eastern Kentucky	UAC	23	9	7	4	2		CH	RU	¹RU	¹CH	12	12		SF	QF	SF	16	16	²SF	16	16	QF	16		16										16	16			✖			✖								✖		✖	
James Madison	FBS	18	9	7	4	2										16				QF			QF	16				16					CH		16	16	¹SF			16			✖	⁵16	⁴CH	¹RU	16	²RU	³SF	³SF				
Montana State	Big Sky	15	9	6	4	2							³CH																		¹16	16			QF				⁴16	QF	³QF		✖				16	⁵SF		⁸RU	⁴SF	⁶16	¹RU	²CH
South Dakota State	MVFC	15	8	7	3	2																																16			16	16	16	✖	⁸QF	⁵SF	⁵SF	⁷16	¹RU	SF	¹CH	¹CH	³SF	¹⁴16
Delaware	FBS	19	13	8	4	1				QF	³RU				QF		16			⁴16	SF	QF		QF	16	⁴SF			²SF			²CH	QF			RU			³RU								✖		SF		16	16		
Sam Houston	FBS	13	10	7	3	1									16					16										QF			SF							¹RU	²RU	16	SF	SF	⁵QF	⁶SF			²CH	¹QF				
Furman	SoCon	20	10	6	3	1					12	³SF		³RU	16		⁴CH	²SF	QF						QF			16	16	³RU	16		²QF	SF	16							16				16		✖			16	⁷QF		
UMass	FBS	8	5	3	3	1	RU										16		16								CH	QF				16			³RU	QF																		
Eastern Washington	Big Sky	15	10	6	2	1								QF							16					³SF							QF	16		QF		16	⁵CH		SF	³SF	⁴QF		²SF		³RU		16	16				
Boise State	FBS	5	4	4	2	1			CH	⁴SF							16		SF				³RU																															
Villanova	Patriot	17	9	4	1	1												16		16	16				16	¹QF					SF						QF	²CH	SF		✖		⁶QF		16			✖		⁵QF		⁸QF	¹¹16	¹²SF
Richmond	Patriot	14	8	3	1	1							QF			16											³16		QF					QF		SF	CH	⁴QF					16	⁷SF	QF						16	16	⁹✖	
Southern Illinois	MVFC	11	6	2	1	1						¹CH																				16	¹16	QF	QF	⁴SF	16	QF											QF	16		16		
Florida A&M	SWAC	8	3	2	1	1	CH																		16	16	QF	SF	16	16																				✖				
Western Kentucky	FBS	8	5	1	1	1										16	QF									QF			QF	16	CH	QF	16																					
Louisiana–Monroe	FBS	4	2	1	1	1										²CH			16		¹QF	16																																
Idaho State	Big Sky	2	1	1	1	1				²CH		12																																										
Illinois State	MVFC	10	7	3	2	-																					16	SF							QF						QF		⁵RU	²QF	✖			QF					¹²16	RU
McNeese	Southland	16	6	3	2	-														16	QF	³QF	⁴QF	¹SF		RU	16		16	16	RU	¹16			16	²16		16				⁶16		⁴16										
Northern Iowa	MVFC	22	14	7	1	-								⁴SF		³SF			16	³QF	³SF	16	16	QF	³SF					SF		QF		RU		¹QF	³SF		✖	⁵QF			16	QF		16	16	QF		✖				
Nevada	FBS	7	7	6	1	-	SF	SF				SF		²SF	¹SF				⁴RU	¹QF																																		
Lehigh	Patriot	13	6	2	1	-		RU	SF																		QF	16	QF	QF			16						16	QF					✖	✖							16	⁵16
Stephen F. Austin	Southland	9	5	2	1	-											QF	³RU				16		SF														QF	16				✖							✖				⁷QF
Louisiana Tech	FBS	2	2	2	1	-					²SF		RU																																									
Colgate	Patriot	11	4	1	1	-					QF	12														16	16	16				⁴RU		16			16				✖			QF			⁸QF							
Arkansas State	FBS	4	4	1	1	-							QF	QF	²RU	QF																																						
Jacksonville State	FBS	10	3	1	1	-																										16	16						16			QF	³16	¹RU	³16	³16	16		⁴QF					
Towson	CAA	3	1	1	1	-																																		16		⁷RU					✖							
Western Carolina	SoCon	1	1	1	1	-						RU																																										
New Hampshire	CAA	19	9	2	-	-														16			16										QF	¹QF	QF	16	QF	QF	QF	16	16	SF	¹SF	✖	16	QF					16		¹⁶✖	✖
Idaho	Big Sky	14	6	2	-	-					QF			12	16	⁴16	¹SF	⁴16	QF		16	SF	16	16																											✖	⁴QF	⁸QF	
William & Mary	Patriot	11	5	2	-	-									16			16	QF			16			QF					16			³SF					SF	²16					16							⁵QF			
Troy	FBS	7	3	2	-	-																SF	16	³16	⁴SF		16	QF	⁴16																									
Wofford	SoCon	10	6	1	-	-																										³SF				QF	16		QF	16	QF				QF	⁷QF	16	✖						
Middle Tennessee	FBS	7	6	1	-	-							SF	¹QF				QF	¹QF	QF	⁴QF		16																															
Weber State	Big Sky	10	5	1	-	-										QF				16																	QF	16							✖	QF	²QF	³SF	16		16			
Western Illinois	OVC	11	4	1	-	-											³16			16					16	²QF	⁴SF		16		²QF	QF							16					16		✖								
Maine	CAA	8	4	1	-	-										16		16												QF	QF						16			QF		⁵16					⁷SF							
Tennessee State	OVC	7	3	1	-	-				QF	⁴SF				QF												16	¹16														16											✖	
Rhode Island	CAA	5	3	1	-	-				QF			²SF	QF																																							¹⁰16	⁹16
South Dakota	MVFC	5	3	1	-	-																																								16				✖		³QF	⁴SF	¹¹QF
Jackson State	SWAC	12	2	1	-	-	SF			QF	12			12	16	16	16	16	16					16	16	16																												
South Carolina State	MEAC	6	2	1	-	-				³SF	QF																										16	16	✖			✖												
Northwestern State	Southland	6	2	1	-	-											QF									16	²SF			16	16		16																					
Samford	SoCon	6	2	1	-	-														SF	16																					✖			✖	✖					⁶QF			
Murray State	MVFC	5	2	1	-	-		SF							16									⁴16	QF						16																							
Incarnate Word	Southland	4	2	1	-	-																																									✖			16	⁷SF		⁶QF	
Grambling State	SWAC	3	1	1	-	-			SF					12				16																																				
Albany	CAA	3	1	1	-	-																																		✖								16				⁵SF		
UCF	FBS	2	1	1	-	-													SF			16																																
Texas State	FBS	2	1	1	-	-																												⁴SF			16																	
Florida Atlantic	FBS	1	1	1	-	-																										SF																						
Eastern Illinois	OVC	16	4	-	-	-					QF	12			³QF			QF						16	16				16	⁴16	16			16	16	16		³16			✖	²QF		✖										
UC Davis	Big Sky	4	3	-	-	-																																									⁶QF			✖			⁵QF	⁸QF
Holy Cross	Patriot	6	2	-	-	-						²QF																										16										✖	16	16	⁸QF			
Coastal Carolina	FBS	6	2	-	-	-																													16				✖		16	QF	⁷QF	✖										
Boston University	defunct	5	2	-	-	-					12	QF	12									⁴QF	16																															
Hofstra	defunct	5	2	-	-	-																		16		16		³QF	QF	16																								
Kennesaw State	FBS	4	2	-	-	-																																								QF	⁴QF	16		16				
Indiana State	MVFC	3	2	-	-	-						QF	⁴QF																														16											
East Tennessee State	SoCon	3	2	-	-	-																			QF																						✖			⁷QF				
Nicholls	Southland	7	1	-	-	-									QF										16									16												✖	16	16				✖		
Northern Arizona	Big Sky	7	1	-	-	-																			16			16		16		QF										✖				✖							✖	
Fordham	Patriot	6	1	-	-	-																									QF					16						16	16	✖							✖			
Southeastern Louisiana	Southland	6	1	-	-	-																																				⁴QF	✖					16		16	16			¹⁶✖
North Dakota	MVFC	6	1	-	-	-																																							⁷16			✖	QF		✖	✖		16
Chattanooga	SoCon	5	1	-	-	-							12																														⁸QF	16	16							16		
North Carolina A&T	CAA	5	1	-	-	-									16						16							QF				16													✖									
The Citadel	SoCon	5	1	-	-	-											16		16		²QF																							16	⁶16									
North Texas	FBS	4	1	-	-	-						⁴QF				16	16						16																															
Missouri State	FBS	4	1	-	-	-												QF	16																														16	✖				
Cal Poly	Big Sky	4	1	-	-	-																												QF			16				16				✖									
Sacramento State	FBS	4	1	-	-	-																																										⁴16		⁴16	²QF	16		
Alcorn State	SWAC	3	1	-	-	-							¹QF								16		16																															
Mercer	SoCon	3	1	-	-	-																																														16	⁷QF	⁶16
Old Dominion	FBS	2	1	-	-	-																																		16	⁴QF													
Charleston Southern	OVC	2	1	-	-	-																																						⁸QF	✖									
Austin Peay	UAC	2	1	-	-	-																																										QF				✖		
Tarleton State	UAC	2	1	-	-	-																																															¹³16	⁴QF
UConn	FBS	1	1	-	-	-																					QF																											
Hampton	CAA	5	-	-	-	-																				16	16						16	³16	16																			
Bethune–Cookman	SWAC	5	-	-	-	-																									16	16							16		✖	✖												
Lafayette	Patriot	5	-	-	-	-																											16	16	16							✖										✖		
Southeast Missouri State	OVC	5	-	-	-	-																																	16								16	✖			✖		✖	
Central Arkansas	UAC	5	-	-	-	-																																		16	16				16	⁴16		⁸16						
San Diego	Pioneer	5	-	-	-	-																																					✖		16	16	✖	✖						
Elon	CAA	4	-	-	-	-																																16								✖	✖				✖			
Stony Brook	CAA	4	-	-	-	-																																		16	16					16	✖							
Sacred Heart	CAA	4	-	-	-	-																																				✖	✖						16	✖				
Central Connecticut	NEC	4	-	-	-	-																																								✖		✖					✖	✖
UT Martin	OVC	3	-	-	-	-																													16															16			16	
Southern Utah	UAC	3	-	-	-	-																																				✖		✖		⁸16								
Duquesne	NEC	3	-	-	-	-																																						✖			16					✖		
Monmouth	CAA	3	-	-	-	-																																								✖		16	16					
Davidson	Pioneer	3	-	-	-	-																																											16	✖	✖			
Drake	Pioneer	3	-	-	-	-																																														✖	✖	✖
Portland State	Big Sky	2	-	-	-	-																							16															⁶16										
Tennessee Tech	SoCon	2	-	-	-	-																																		✖														¹³✖
Saint Francis (PA)	Division III	2	-	-	-	-																																							✖						✖			
Lamar	Southland	2	-	-	-	-																																									✖							✖
Gardner–Webb	OVC	2	-	-	-	-																																													16	✖		
Abilene Christian	UAC	2	-	-	-	-																																															¹⁵16	¹⁰16
Mississippi Valley State	SWAC	1	-	-	-	-							12																																									
Akron	FBS	1	-	-	-	-								12																																								
Howard	MEAC	1	-	-	-	-																16																																
Northeastern	defunct	1	-	-	-	-																									⁴16																							
Delaware State	MEAC	1	-	-	-	-																														16																		
Robert Morris	NEC	1	-	-	-	-																																	✖															
Norfolk State	MEAC	1	-	-	-	-																																		✖														
Wagner	NEC	1	-	-	-	-																																			16													
Butler	Pioneer	1	-	-	-	-																																				✖												
Liberty	FBS	1	-	-	-	-																																					16											
Morgan State	MEAC	1	-	-	-	-																																					✖											
Dayton	Pioneer	1	-	-	-	-																																						✖										
VMI	SoCon	1	-	-	-	-																																											16					
North Carolina Central	MEAC	1	-	-	-	-																																														✖		
Yale	Ivy League	1	-	-	-	-																																																16
Harvard	Ivy League	1	-	-	-	-																																																✖

== MVPs ==
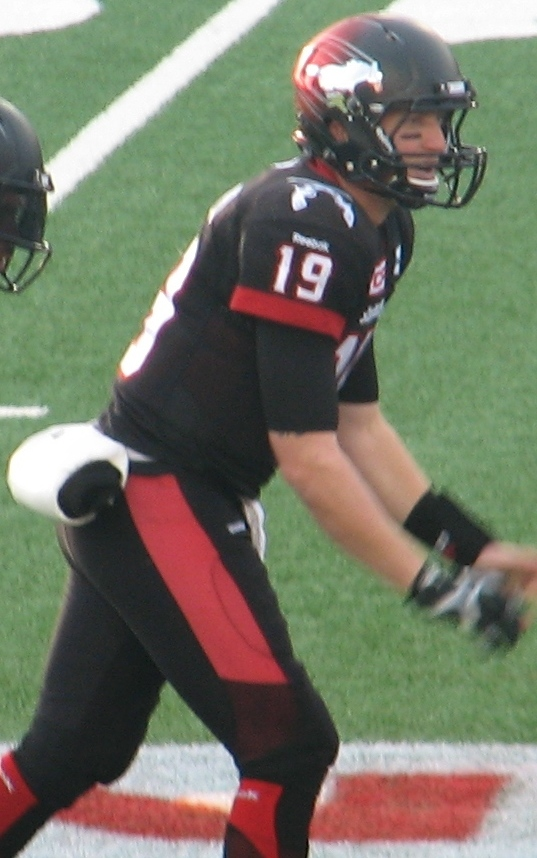
Bo Levi Mitchell was MVP of the final for the 2010 season.

Since 2009, a Most Outstanding Player has been named for each final.

Season	Player	Team	Position
2009	Matt Szczur	Villanova	WR
2010	Bo Levi Mitchell	Eastern Washington	QB
2011	Travis Beck	North Dakota State	LB
2012	Brock Jensen	North Dakota State	QB
2013	Brock Jensen	North Dakota State	QB
2014	Carson Wentz	North Dakota State	QB
2015	Carson Wentz	North Dakota State	QB
2016	Khalid Abdullah	James Madison	RB
2017	Easton Stick	North Dakota State	QB
2018	Darrius Shepherd	North Dakota State	WR
2019	Trey Lance	North Dakota State	QB
2020	Jequez Ezzard	Sam Houston	WR
2021	Hunter Luepke	North Dakota State	FB
2022	Mark Gronowski	South Dakota State	QB
2023	Mark Gronowski	South Dakota State	QB
2024	Cam Miller	North Dakota State	QB
2025	Justin Lamson	Montana State	QB

Note: starting with the 2010 season, the final game is played in the next calendar year.

== Most appearances ==
The following table summarizes appearances in the final, by team, since the 1978 season, the first year of Division I-AA (the predecessor of FCS).

Updated through the January 2026 championship game (48 finals, 96 total appearances). Schools are listed by their current athletic brand names, which do not always match those used in a given season.

Team	Record				Appearances by season	
Team	Games	W	L	Win %	Won	Lost
North Dakota State	11	10	1	.909	2011*, 2012*, 2013*, 2014*, 2015*, 2017*, 2018*, 2019*, 2021*, 2024*	2022*
Georgia Southern^	8	6	2	.750	1985, 1986, 1989, 1990, 1999, 2000	1988, 1998
Montana	8	2	6	.250	1995, 2001	1996, 2000, 2004, 2008, 2009, 2023*
Youngstown State	7	4	3	.571	1991, 1993, 1994, 1997	1992, 1999, 2016*
Marshall^	6	2	4	.333	1992, 1996	1987, 1991, 1993, 1995
James Madison^	4	2	2	.500	2004, 2016*	2017*, 2019*
Eastern Kentucky	4	2	2	.500	1979, 1982	1980, 1981
Montana State	4	2	2	.500	1984, 2025*	2021*, 2024*
Delaware^	4	1	3	.250	2003	1982, 2007, 2010*
Appalachian State^	3	3	0	1.000	2005, 2006, 2007	
South Dakota State	3	2	1	.667	2022*, 2023*	2020*
Furman	3	1	2	.333	1988	1985, 2001
Sam Houston^	3	1	2	.333	2020*	2011*, 2012*
Massachusetts^	3	1	2	.333	1998	1978, 2006
Boise State^	2	1	1	.500	1980	1994
Eastern Washington	2	1	1	.500	2010*	2018*
McNeese	2	0	2	.000		1997, 2002
Illinois State	2	0	2	.000		2014*, 2025*
Florida A&M	1	1	0	1.000	1978	
Idaho State	1	1	0	1.000	1981	
Louisiana–Monroe^	1	1	0	1.000	1987	
Richmond	1	1	0	1.000	2008	
Southern Illinois	1	1	0	1.000	1983	
Villanova	1	1	0	1.000	2009	
Western Kentucky^	1	1	0	1.000	2002	
Arkansas State^	1	0	1	.000		1986
Colgate	1	0	1	.000		2003
Jacksonville State^	1	0	1	.000		2015*
Lehigh	1	0	1	.000		1979
Louisiana Tech^	1	0	1	.000		1984
Nevada^	1	0	1	.000		1990
Northern Iowa	1	0	1	.000		2005
Stephen F. Austin	1	0	1	.000		1989
Towson	1	0	1	.000		2013*
Western Carolina	1	0	1	.000		1983

* Denotes finals played in the following calendar year.
^ Team is now a member of the Football Bowl Subdivision (FBS).

== Appearances by conference ==
The following table summarizes appearances in the final, by conference, since the 1978 season, the first year of Division I-AA (the predecessor of FCS).

Updated through the January 2026 championship game (48 finals, 96 total appearances).

Conference	Record				App	
Conference	Games	W	L	Win %	Won	Lost
MVFC	21	14	7	.667	1997, 2002, 2011*, 2012*, 2013*, 2014*, 2015*, 2017*, 2018*, 2019*, 2021*, 2022*, 2023*, 2024*	1999, 2005, 2014*, 2016*, 2020*, 2022*, 2025*
Big Sky	18	7	11	.389	1980, 1981, 1984, 1995, 2001, 2010*, 2025*	1990, 1994, 1996, 2000, 2004, 2008, 2009, 2018*, 2021*, 2023*, 2024*
SoCon	16	8	8	.500	1988, 1992, 1996, 1999, 2000, 2005, 2006, 2007	1983, 1985, 1987, 1991, 1993, 1995, 1998, 2001
Independent	11	7	4	.636	1985, 1986, 1989, 1990, 1991, 1993, 1994	1979, 1982, 1988, 1992
Southland	9	2	7	.222	1987, 2020*	1984, 1986, 1989, 1997, 2002, 2011*, 2012*
CAA Football	8	3	5	.375	2008, 2009, 2016*	2007, 2010*, 2013*, 2017*, 2019*
OVC	5	2	3	.400	1979, 1982	1980, 1981, 2015*
A-10	4	3	1	.750	1998, 2003, 2004	2006
MVC	1	1	0	1.000	1983	
SIAC	1	1	0	1.000	1978	
Patriot League	1	0	1	.000		2003
Yankee	1	0	1	.000		1978

- Games marked with an asterisk (*) were played in the following calendar year.
- Records reflect conference affiliations at the time each game was played.
- Conferences in italics are defunct or not currently active in FCS.
- The Missouri Valley Conference (MVC) and Missouri Valley Football Conference (MVFC) are historically related but independently operating entities. MVFC was known as the Gateway Football Conference until June 2008.
- The Yankee Conference, Atlantic 10 Conference (A-10), and CAA Football, although separately chartered, are effectively the same entity in football. The Yankee Conference, formerly an all-sports conference but a football-only league since 1976, was effectively merged into the A-10 after the 1996 season. In turn, the A-10 shut down its football league after the 2006 season, with the multi-sports Colonial Athletic Association (since renamed the Coastal Athletic Association) taking over administration of that league as the separate entity of CAA Football.
- Teams from the same conference have met in the championship game following the 2014 and 2022 seasons. Both matchups involved MVFC teams.

== Game records ==
This table lists records for the Championship Game.

Record	Qty.	Team	Opponent	Edition
Most points scored (one team)	59	Georgia Southern	Youngstown State	1999
Most points scored (losing team)	43	Georgia Southern	UMass	1998
Most points scored (both teams)	98	UMass (55)	Georgia Southern (43)	1998
Fewest points allowed	0	Delaware	Colgate	2003
Largest margin of victory	40	Delaware (40)	Colgate (0)	2003
Attendance	32,106	Montana vs. Marshall		1995

== Media coverage ==
The game has been televised on an ESPN affiliated network since 1995.

Season	Network
1978–1981	ABC
1982	CBS Sports
1983	ABC
1984	Satellite Program Network
1985–1989	ESPN
1990–1994	CBS
1995–2001	ESPN
2002–2018	ESPN2
2019–2020	ABC
2021	ESPN2
2022–2023	ABC
2024–present	ESPN

Note: starting with the 2010 season, the final game is played in the next calendar year.

Date	Network	Play-by-play announcers	Color commentators	Sideline reporter
January 5, 2026	ESPN	Dave Flemming	Brock Osweiler	Stormy Buonatony
January 6, 2025	ESPN	Dave Flemming	Brock Osweiler	Stormy Buonatony
January 7, 2024	ABC	Roy Philpott	Roddy Jones	Taylor McGregor
January 8, 2023	ABC	Roy Philpott	Jay Walker	Paul Carcaterra
January 8, 2022	ESPN2	Dave Flemming	Jay Walker	Stormy Buonatony
May 16, 2021	ABC	Dave Pasch	Andre Ware	Kris Budden
January 11, 2020	ABC	Mark Jones	Dusty Dvoracek	Olivia Dekker
January 5, 2019	ESPN2	Taylor Zarzour	Matt Stinchcomb	Kris Budden
January 6, 2018	ESPN2	Dave Neal	Matt Stinchcomb	Quint Kessenich
January 7, 2017	ESPN2	Anish Shroff	Ahmad D. Brooks	Quint Kessenich
January 9, 2016	ESPN2	Anish Shroff	Ahmad D. Brooks	Quint Kessenich
January 10, 2015	ESPN2	Anish Shroff	Kelly Stouffer	Cara Capuano
January 4, 2014	ESPN2	Anish Shroff	Kelly Stouffer	Cara Capuano
January 5, 2013	ESPN2	Dave Neal	Jay Walker	Cara Capuano
January 7, 2012	ESPN2	Dave Neal	David Diaz-Infante	Allison Williams
January 7, 2011	ESPN2	Dave Neal	Andre Ware	Jon Berger
December 18, 2009	ESPN2	Eric Collins	Brock Huard	Cara Campuano
December 19, 2008	ESPN2	Bob Wischusen	Brock Huard	
December 14, 2007	ESPN2	Sean McDonough	Chris Spielman	Rob Stone
December 15, 2006	ESPN2	Dave Pasch	Rod Gilmore and Trevor Matich	Dave Ryan
December 16, 2005	ESPN2	Dave Pasch	Rod Gilmore and Trevor Matich	Stacey Dales-Schuman
December 17, 2004	ESPN2	Dave Pasch	Rod Gilmore and Trevor Matich	Rob Stone
December 19, 2003	ESPN2	Sean McDonough	Mike Golic and Rod Gilmore	Rob Stone
December 20, 2002	ESPN2	Ron Franklin	Mike Gottfried	Adrian Karsten
December 21, 2001	ESPN	Ron Franklin	Mike Gottfried	
December 16, 2000	ESPN	Rich Waltz	Rod Gilmore	Dave Ryan
December 18, 1999	ESPN	Rich Waltz	Rod Gilmore	Don McPherson
December 19, 1998	ESPN	Dave Barnett	Bill Curry	Dave Ryan
December 20, 1997	ESPN	Dave Barnett	Bill Curry	
December 21, 1996	ESPN	Brad Nessler	Gary Danielson	
December 16, 1995	ESPN	Joel Meyers	Todd Christensen	Adrian Karsten
December 17, 1994	CBS	Sean McDonough	Steve Davis	Dave Logan
December 18, 1993	CBS	Sean McDonough	Dan Jiggetts	Jim Gray
December 19, 1992	CBS	Jim Nantz	John Robinson	
December 21, 1991	CBS	Brad Nessler	Dan Jiggetts	
December 15, 1990	CBS	Jim Nantz	Tim Brant	John Dockery
December 16, 1989	ESPN	Barry Tompkins	Stan White	
December 17, 1988	ESPN	Tim Brando	Stan White	
December 19, 1987	ESPN	Denny Schreiner	Stan White	
December 19, 1986	ESPN	Tim Brando	Kevin Kiley	
December 21, 1985	ESPN	Mike Patrick	Sam Adkins	
December 15, 1984	Satellite Program Network	Bill Flemming	Steve Davis	
December 17, 1983	ABC	Keith Jackson	Frank Broyles	
December 18, 1982	CBS	Lindsey Nelson	Steve Davis	
December 19, 1981	ABC	Bill Flemming	Frank Broyles	
December 20, 1980	ABC	Bill Flemming	Frank Broyles	
December 15, 1979	ABC	Bill Flemming	Frank Broyles	
December 16, 1978	ABC	Bill Flemming	Frank Broyles	
