= 2024 Northern Colorado Bears football team =

American college football season

2024 Northern Colorado Bears football
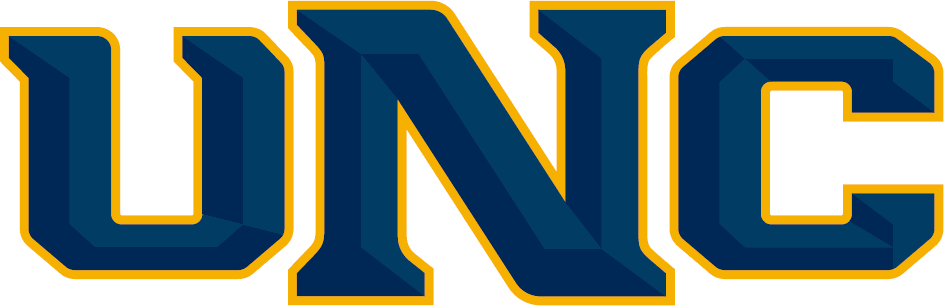
- Conference: Big Sky Conference
- Record: 1–11 (1–7 Big Sky)
- Head coach: Ed Lamb (2nd season)
- Offensive coordinator: Justin Walterscheid (1st season)
- Defensive coordinator: Preston Hadley (2nd season)
- Home stadium: Nottingham Field

2024 Big Sky Conference football standings
	Conf.			Overall
Team	W		L	W		L
No. 2 Montana State $^	8	–	0	15	–	1
No. 5 UC Davis ^	7	–	1	11	–	3
No. 7 Idaho ^	6	–	2	10	–	4
No. 22 Northern Arizona ^	6	–	2	8	–	5
No. 10 Montana ^	5	–	3	9	–	5
Idaho State	3	–	5	5	–	7
Eastern Washington	3	–	5	4	–	8
Weber State	3	–	5	4	–	8
Portland State	3	–	5	3	–	8
Cal Poly	2	–	6	3	–	8
Sacramento State	1	–	7	3	–	9
Northern Colorado	1	–	7	1	–	11
$ – Conference champion; ^ – FCS playoff participant; Rankings from STATS Poll

The 2024 Northern Colorado Bears football team represented the University of Northern Colorado as a member of the Big Sky Conference during the 2024 NCAA Division I FCS football season. They were led by second-year head coach Ed Lamb and played their home games at Nottingham Field in Greeley, Colorado. The Bears snapped their 18-game losing streak on October 12 with a victory against Weber State.

== Schedule ==
Date	Time	Opponent	Site	TV	Result	Attendance
August 31	5:00 p.m.	at No. 14 Incarnate Word*	Gayle and Tom Benson Stadium; San Antonio, TX	ESPN+	L 7–28	2,257
September 7	5:00 p.m.	at Colorado State*	Canvas Stadium; Fort Collins, CO	MW Network	L 17–38	36,573
September 14	2:00 p.m.	No. 25 Abilene Christian*	Nottingham Field; Greeley, CO	ESPN+	L 22–24	3,017
September 21	6:00 p.m.	at Stephen F. Austin*	Homer Bryce Stadium; Nacogdoches, TX	ESPN+	L 7–48	7,683
September 28	1:00 p.m.	Cal Poly^{†}	Nottingham Field; Greeley, CO	ESPN+	L 7–28	4,495
October 5	2:00 p.m.	at No. 3 Montana State	Bobcat Stadium; Bozeman, MT	ESPN+	L 14–55	22,007
October 12	6:00 p.m.	at No. 20 Weber State	Stewart Stadium; Ogden, UT	ESPN+	W 21–17	10,345
October 26	1:00 p.m.	No. 9 Montana	Nottingham Field; Greeley, CO	ESPN+	L 0–24	3,902
November 2	2:00 p.m.	at No. 4 UC Davis	UC Davis Health Stadium; Davis, CA	ESPN+	L 7–59	10,638
November 9	12:00 p.m.	Eastern Washington	Nottingham Field; Greeley, CO	ESPN+	L 15–43	1,880
November 16	12:00 p.m.	No. 25 Northern Arizona	Nottingham Field; Greeley, CO	ESPN+	L 3–44	2,279
November 23	2:00 p.m.	at Portland State	Hillsboro Stadium; Hillsboro, OR	ESPN+	L 13–45	1,791
*Non-conference game; ^{†}Homecoming; Rankings from STATS Poll released prior to the game; All times are in Mountain time

- Source: Schedule

== Game summaries ==
=== at No. 14 Incarnate Word ===
Game One – Northern Colorado Bears (0–0) at No. 14 Incarnate Word Cardinals (0–0)

Quarter	1	2	3	4	Total
Bears	7	0	0	0	7
No. 14 Cardinals	7	7	14	0	28

at Gayle and Tom Benson Stadium, San Antonio, TX

- Date: August 31
- Game time: 6:00 p.m.
- Game weather: Temperature: 92 °F (33 °C) • Wind: NE 10 mph • Weather: Cloudy
- Game attendance: 2,257
- Referee: James Brookhart
- TV announcers (ESPN+): Karl Schoening (play-by-play)
- Box Score

Game information

First Quarter

- UIW – 13:40 Dekalon Taylor 27-yard run, Brack Peacock kick
  UIW 7–0 Drive: 5 plays, 75 yards, 1:20
- UNC – 5:40 Vann Schield 58-yard run, Hunter Green kick
  Tied 7–7 Drive: 5 plays, 89 yards, 2:12

Second Quarter

- UIW – 2:57 Jalen Walthall 46-yard pass from Zach Calzada, Brack Peacock kick
  UIW 14–7 Drive: 7 plays, 82 yards, 3:18

Third Quarter

- UIW – 14:23 Logan Compton 13-yard pass from Zach Calzada, Brack Peacock kick
  UIW 21–7 Drive: 2 plays, 16 yards, 0:37
- UIW – 6:35 Dekalon Taylor 1-yard run, Brack Peacock kick
  UIW 28–7 Drive: 13 plays, 86 yards, 6:11

Statistics	UNCO	UIW
First downs	15	24
Total yards	71–360	74–408
Rushing yards	43–214	39–203
Passing yards	146	205
Passing: Comp–Att–Int	17–28–2	21–35–1
Time of possession	29:47	30:13

Team	Category	Player	Statistics
Northern Colorado	Passing	Peter Costelli	16/26, 141 yards, 2 INT
Northern Colorado	Rushing	Vann Schield	11 carries, 80 yards, 1 TD
Northern Colorado	Receiving	Brayden Munroe	7 receptions, 66 yards
Incarnate Word	Passing	Zach Calzada	21/35, 205 yards, 2 TD, 1 INT
Incarnate Word	Rushing	Dekalon Taylor	14 carries, 79 yards, 2 TD
Incarnate Word	Receiving	Jalen Walthall	5 receptions, 103 yards, 1 TD

=== at Colorado State (FBS) ===
Game Two – Northern Colorado Bears (0–1) vs Colorado State Rams (FBS) (0–1) – Game summary

Quarter	1	2	3	4	Total
Bears	7	0	7	3	17
Rams (FBS)	10	14	7	7	38

at Canvas Stadium • Fort Collins, CO

- Date: September 7, 2024
- Game time: 5:00 p.m.
- Game weather: Sunny, 84 °F (29 °C)
- Game attendance: 36,573
- Referee: Nolan Dumas
- TV announcers (Altitude): Brian Roth (play-by-play) and Mike Sanford Jr. (analyst)

Game information

First quarter

- CSU – Tory Horton 78-yard punt return (Jordan Noyes kick), 13:18. Rams 7–0.
- CSU – Jordan Noyes 20-yard field goal, 7:14. Rams 10–0. Drive: 7 plays, 84 yards, 3:26.
- UNCO – Fisher Clements 9-yard pass from Peter Costelli (Hunter Green kick), 0:45. Rams 10–7. Drive: 4 plays, 33 yards, 1:23.

Second quarter

- CSU – Brayden Fowler-Nicolosi 2-yard run (Jordan Noyes kick), 10:23. Rams 17–7. Drive: 10 plays, 75 yards, 5:22.
- CSU – Keegan Holles 4-yard run (Jordan Noyes kick), 0:29. Rams 24–7. Drive: 14 plays, 58 yards, 6:22.

Third quarter

- UNCO – Brayden Munroe 50-yard pass from Peter Costelli (Hunter Green kick), 12:13. Rams 24–14. Drive: 5 plays, 78 yards, 2:27.
- CSU – Caleb Goodie 40-yard pass from Brayden Fowler-Nicolosi (Jordan Noyes kick), 8:01. Rams 31–14. Drive: 3 plays, 80 yards, 1:22.

Fourth quarter

- UNCO – Hunter Green 53-yard field goal, 4:11. Rams 31–17. Drive: 9 plays, 46 yards, 3:34.
- CSU – Avery Morrow 8-yard run (Jordan Noyes kick), 0:43. Rams 38–17. Drive: 7 plays, 44 yards, 3:27.

Statistics	UNCO	CSU
First downs	13	21
Total yards	298	426
Rushing yards	107	224
Passing yards	191	202
Passing: Comp–Att–Int	12–23–0	18–27–0
Time of possession	27:54	32:06

Team	Category	Player	Statistics
Northern Colorado	Passing	Peter Costelli	11/22, 187 yards, 2 TD
Northern Colorado	Rushing	Peter Costelli	10 carries, 32 yards
Northern Colorado	Receiving	Brayden Munroe	3 receptions, 86 yards, TD
Colorado State	Passing	Brayden Fowler-Nicolosi	18/27, 202 yards, TD
Colorado State	Rushing	Keegan Holles	10 carries, 89 yards, TD
Colorado State	Receiving	Tory Horton	3 receptions, 65 yards

=== No. 25 Abilene Christian ===
Game Three – No. 25 Abilene Christian Wildcats (1–1) at Northern Colorado Bears (0–2) – Game summary

Quarter	1	2	3	4	Total
No. 25 Wildcats	0	7	14	3	24
Bears	3	7	0	12	22

at Nottingham Field, Greeley, CO

- Date: September 14
- Game time: 3:00 p.m. CDT/2:00 p.m. MDT
- Game weather: Sunny, 85 °F (29 °C)
- Game attendance: 3,017
- Referee: Gregg Wilson
- TV announcers (ESPN+): Christian Ceyanes (play-by-play) and Nick Hager (analyst)

Game information

First quarter

- UNCO – Hunter Green 35-yard field goal, 3:57. Bears 3–0. Drive: 7 plays, 48 yards, 3:42.

Second quarter

- UNCO – Caden Meis 2-yard run (Hunter Green kick), 13:52. Bears 10–0. Drive: 12 plays, 62 yards, 4:42.
- ACU – Sam Hicks 17-yard pass from Maverick McIvor (Ritse Vaes kick), 1:09. Bears 10–7. Drive: 4 plays, 66 yards, 0:46.

Third quarter

- ACU – Sam Hicks 65-yard run (Ritse Vaes kick), 9:32. Wildcats 14–10. Drive: 3 plays, 80 yards, 1:05.
- ACU – Isaiah Johnson 5-yard run (Ritse Vaes kick), 1:00. Wildcats 21–10. Drive: 9 plays, 84 yards, 3:50.

Fourth quarter

- UNCO – Caden Meis 2-yard run (pass failed), 8:42. Wildcats 21–16. Drive: 16 plays, 75 yards, 7:18.
- UNCO – Hank Gibbs 3-yard run (pass failed), 1:10. Bears 22–21. Drive: 14 plays, 69 yards, 5:29.
- ACU – Ritse Vaes 54-yard field goal, 0:00. Wildcats 24–22. Drive: 9 plays, 38 yards, 1:10.

Statistics	ACU	UNCO
First downs	12	18
Total yards	325	266
Rushing yards	96	241
Passing yards	229	25
Turnovers	0	1
Time of possession	20:17	39:43

Team	Category	Player	Statistics
Abilene Christian	Passing	Maverick McIvor	20/34, 229 yards, TD
Abilene Christian	Rushing	Sam Hicks	9 rushes, 76 yards, TD
Abilene Christian	Receiving	Javon Gibson	7 receptions, 102 yards
Northern Colorado	Passing	Jonah Chong	4/8, 14 yards
Northern Colorado	Rushing	Darius Stewart	21 rushes, 132 yards
Northern Colorado	Receiving	Brayden Munroe	1 reception, 8 yards

=== at Stephen F. Austin ===
Game Four – Northern Colorado Bears (0–3) vs Stephen F. Austin Lumberjacks (1–2) – Game summary

Quarter	1	2	3	4	Total
Bears	0	0		0	0
Lumberjacks	14	21	7	6	48

at Homer Bryce Stadium, Nacogdoches, TX

- Date: September 21, 2024
- Game time: 7:02 p.m.
- Game weather: Sunny
- Game attendance: 7,683
- TV: ESPN+
- Box Score

Game information

First quarter
Second quarter
Third quarter
Fourth quarter

Statistics	UNCO	SFA
First downs	12	26
Total yards	242	509
Rushing yards	224	250
Passing yards	18	259
Passing: Comp–Att–Int	13–21–0	18–28–0
Time of possession	33:34	26:26

Team	Category	Player	Statistics
Northern Colorado	Passing	Kia'i Keone	10/14, 20 yards
Northern Colorado	Rushing	Kia'i Keone	17 carries, 76 yards
Northern Colorado	Receiving	Brayden Munroe	3 receptions, 16 yards
Stephen F. Austin	Passing	Sam Vidlak	16/26, 219 yards, 3 TD
Stephen F. Austin	Rushing	Jaylen Jenkins	6 carries, 80 yards, 2 TD
Stephen F. Austin	Receiving	Blaine Green	5 receptions, 93 yards

=== Cal Poly ===
Game Five – Cal Poly Mustangs (1–2) vs Northern Colorado Bears (0–4) – Game summary

Quarter	1	2	3	4	Total
Mustangs	0	0	0	0	0
Bears	0	0	0	0	0

at Nottingham Field • Greeley, CO

- Date: September 28, 2024
- Game time: 1:00 p.m.
- Game weather: 0 °F (−18 °C)
- TV: ESPN+

Game information

First quarter
Second quarter
Third quarter
Fourth quarter

Statistics	CP	UNCO
First downs		
Total yards		
Rushing yards		
Passing yards		
Passing: Comp–Att–Int		
Time of possession		

Team	Category	Player	Statistics
Cal Poly	Passing		
Cal Poly	Rushing		
Cal Poly	Receiving		
Northern Colorado	Passing		
Northern Colorado	Rushing		
Northern Colorado	Receiving		

=== at No. 3 Montana State ===
Game Six – Northern Colorado Bears (0–5) vs No. 3 Montana State Bobcats (5–0) – Game summary

Quarter	1	2	3	4	Total
Bears	0	0	14	3	17
No. 3 Bobcats	13	14	21	7	55

at Bobcat Stadium • Bozeman, MT

- Date: Saturday October 5, 2024
- Game time: 2:00 p.m. MST
- Game weather: Sunny • Temperature: 58 °F (14 °C) • Wind: S 6 mph
- Game attendance: 22,007
- Referee: Jim Crowley
- TV announcers (ESPN+): Ben Creighton (play-by-play), Ty Gregorak (analyst) and Grace Lawrence (sideline)

Game information

First quarter

- (9:56) MTST – Ryan Lonergan 9-yard pass from Tommy Mellott (Drive: 5 plays, 63 yards, 3:16; Montana State 6–0)
- (3:12) MTST – Rohan Jones 6-yard pass from Tommy Mellott, Myles Sansted kick (Drive: 9 plays, 51 yards, 5:30; Montana State 13–0)

Second quarter

- (9:45) MTST – Taco Dowler 34-yard pass from Tommy Mellott, Myles Sansted kick (Drive: 2 plays, 37 yards, 0:46; Montana State 20–0)
- (6:16) MTST – Tommy Mellott 13-yard run, Myles Sansted kick (Drive: 5 plays, 35 yards, 2:45; Montana State 27–0)

Third quarter

- (8:25) MTST – Ty McCullouch 50-yard pass from Tommy Mellott, Myles Sansted kick (Drive: 5 plays, 61 yards, 2:37; Montana State 34–0)
- (5:45) UNCO – Carver Cheeks 14-yard pass from Caden Meis, Hunter Green kick (Drive: 4 plays, 58 yards, 1:26; Montana State 34–7)
- (4:58) MTST – Taco Dowler 72-yard pass from Tommy Mellott, Myles Sansted kick (Drive: 2 plays, 75 yards, 0:47; Montana State 41–7)
- (2:07) UNCO – Brayden Munroe 28-yard pass from Kia'i Keone, Hunter Green kick (Drive: 6 plays, 75 yards, 2:51; Montana State 41–14)
- (0:21) MTST – Scottre Humphrey 17-yard run, Myles Sansted kick (Drive: 3 plays, 75 yards, 1:39; Montana State 48–14)

Fourth quarter

- (11:14) UNCO – Hunter Green 29-yard field goal (Drive: 5 plays, 29 yards, 1:24; Montana State 48–17)
- (8:58) MTST – Chance Wilson 5-yard run, Myles Sansted kick (Drive: 17 plays, 75 yards, 9:20; Montana State 55–17)

Statistics	UNCO	MTST
First downs	20	21
Total yards	362	510
Rushing yards	101	232
Passing yards	261	278
Passing: Comp–Att–Int	18–30–1	11–16–0
Time of possession	25:20	34:40

Team	Category	Player	Statistics
Northern Colorado	Passing	Kia'i Keone	17/29, 247 yards, TD, INT
Northern Colorado	Rushing	Caden Meis	10 carries, 35 yards
Northern Colorado	Receiving	Brayden Munroe	5 receptions, 84 yards, TD
Montana State	Passing	Tommy Mellott	8/12, 225 yards, 4 TD
Montana State	Rushing	Scottre Humphrey	10 carries, 81 yards, TD
Montana State	Receiving	Taco Dowler	2 receptions, 106 yards, 2 TD

=== at No. 20 Weber State ===
Game Seven – Northern Colorado Bears (0–6) vs No. 20 Weber State Wildcats (3–3) – Game summary

Quarter	1	2	3	4	Total
Bears	0	0	0	0	0
No. 20 Wildcats	0	0	0	0	0

at Stewart Stadium, Ogden, UT

- Date: Saturday October 12, 2024
- Game time: 6:00 p.m. MDT
- TV announcers (ESPN+): TBD

Game information

First quarter
Second quarter
Third quarter
Fourth quarter

Statistics	UNCO	WEB
First downs		
Total yards		
Rushing yards		
Passing yards		
Passing: Comp–Att–Int		
Time of possession		

Team	Category	Player	Statistics
Northern Colorado	Passing		
Northern Colorado	Rushing		
Northern Colorado	Receiving		
Weber State	Passing		
Weber State	Rushing		
Weber State	Receiving		

=== No. 9 Montana ===
Game Eight – No. 9 Montana Grizzlies (5–2) vs Northern Colorado Bears (1–6) – Game summary

Quarter	1	2	3	4	Total
No. 9 Grizzlies	0	0	0	0	0
Bears	0	0	0	0	0

at Nottingham Field • Greeley, CO

- Date: Saturday October 26, 2024
- Game time: 1:00 p.m.
- Game weather: 0 °F (−18 °C)
- TV announcers (ESPN+): Jay Kohn (play-by-play), Marty Mornhinweg (analyst) and Kyle Hanson (sideline)

Game information

First quarter
Second quarter
Third quarter
Fourth quarter

Statistics	MONT	UNCO
First downs		
Total yards		
Rushing yards		
Passing yards		
Passing: Comp–Att–Int		
Time of possession		

Team	Category	Player	Statistics
Montana	Passing		
Montana	Rushing		
Montana	Receiving		
Northern Colorado	Passing		
Northern Colorado	Rushing		
Northern Colorado	Receiving		

=== at No. 4 UC Davis ===
Game Nine – Northern Colorado Bears (1–7) vs No. 4 UC Davis Aggies (7–1) – Game summary

Quarter	1	2	3	4	Total
Bears	0	0	0	0	0
No. 4 Aggies	0	0	0	0	0

at UC Davis Health Stadium, Davis, CA

- Date: Saturday November 2, 2024
- Game time: 2:00 p.m. MDT
- TV announcers (ESPN+): Scott Marsh (play-by-play) and Scott Gordon (analyst)

Game information

First quarter
Second quarter
Third quarter
Fourth quarter

Statistics	UNCO	UCD
First downs		
Total yards		
Rushing yards		
Passing yards		
Passing: Comp–Att–Int		
Time of possession		

Team	Category	Player	Statistics
Northern Colorado	Passing		
Northern Colorado	Rushing		
Northern Colorado	Receiving		
UC Davis	Passing		
UC Davis	Rushing		
UC Davis	Receiving		

=== Eastern Washington ===
Game Ten – Eastern Washington Eagles (2–7) vs Northern Colorado Bears (1–8) – Game summary

Quarter	1	2	3	4	Total
Eagles	22	7	7	7	43
Bears	0	8	7	0	15

at Nottingham Field • Greeley, CO

- Date: Saturday November 9, 2024
- Game time: 12:00 p.m.
- Game weather: 0 °F (−18 °C)
- Game attendance: 1,880
- TV announcers (ESPN+): Christian Saez, Nick Hager

Game information

First quarter
Second quarter
Third quarter
Fourth quarter

Statistics	EWU	UNCO
First downs	33	12
Total yards	538	323
Rushing yards	339	48
Passing yards	199	275
Passing: Comp–Att–Int	16-24-1	13-26-0
Time of possession	43:38	16:22

Team	Category	Player	Statistics
Eastern Washington	Passing	Kekoa Visperas	13-20 179 Yards 3 TD 1 INT
Eastern Washington	Rushing	Malik Dotson	17 Carries 125 Yards
Eastern Washington	Receiving	Efton Chism III	10 Receptions 93 Yards 2 TD
Northern Colorado	Passing	Peter Costelli	11-23 258 Yards 2 TD
Northern Colorado	Rushing	Jacquez Robertson	2 Carries 17 Yards
Northern Colorado	Receiving	Carver Cheeks	4 Receptions 136 Yards 1 TD

=== No. 25 Northern Arizona ===
Game Eleven – No. 25 Northern Arizona Lumberjacks (6–4) vs Northern Colorado Bears (1–9) – Game summary

Quarter	1	2	3	4	Total
No. 25 Lumberjacks	0	0	0	0	0
Bears	0	0	0	0	0

at Nottingham Field • Greeley, CO

- Date: Saturday November 16, 2024
- Game time: 12:00 p.m.
- Game weather: 0 °F (−18 °C)
- TV: ESPN+

Game information

First quarter
Second quarter
Third quarter
Fourth quarter

Statistics	NAU	UNCO
First downs		
Total yards		
Rushing yards		
Passing yards		
Passing: Comp–Att–Int		
Time of possession		

Team	Category	Player	Statistics
Northern Arizona	Passing		
Northern Arizona	Rushing		
Northern Arizona	Receiving		
Northern Colorado	Passing		
Northern Colorado	Rushing		
Northern Colorado	Receiving		

=== at Portland State ===
Game Twelve – Northern Colorado Bears (1–10) vs Portland State Vikings (2–8) – Game summary

Quarter	1	2	3	4	Total
Bears	0	0	0	0	0
Vikings	0	0	0	0	0

at Hillsboro Stadium, Hillsboro, OR

- Date: Saturday November 23, 2024
- Game time: 2:00 p.m. MDT
- TV announcers (ESPN+): TBD

Game information

First quarter
Second quarter
Third quarter
Fourth quarter

Statistics	UNCO	PRST
First downs		
Total yards		
Rushing yards		
Passing yards		
Passing: Comp–Att–Int		
Time of possession		

Team	Category	Player	Statistics
Northern Colorado	Passing		
Northern Colorado	Rushing		
Northern Colorado	Receiving		
Portland State	Passing		
Portland State	Rushing		
Portland State	Receiving		
