= 2024 Eastern Washington Eagles football team =

American college football season

2024 Eastern Washington Eagles football
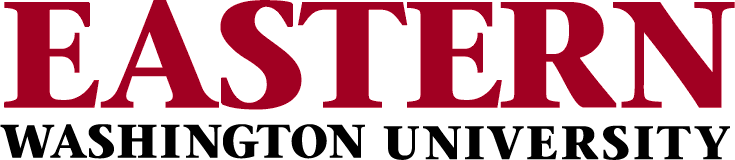
- Conference: Big Sky Conference
- Record: 4–8 (3–5 Big Sky)
- Head coach: Aaron Best (8th season)
- Offensive coordinator: Jim Chapin (3rd season)
- Defensive coordinator: Eric Sanders (1st season)
- Home stadium: Roos Field

2024 Big Sky Conference football standings
	Conf.			Overall
Team	W		L	W		L
No. 2 Montana State $^	8	–	0	15	–	1
No. 5 UC Davis ^	7	–	1	11	–	3
No. 7 Idaho ^	6	–	2	10	–	4
No. 22 Northern Arizona ^	6	–	2	8	–	5
No. 10 Montana ^	5	–	3	9	–	5
Idaho State	3	–	5	5	–	7
Eastern Washington	3	–	5	4	–	8
Weber State	3	–	5	4	–	8
Portland State	3	–	5	3	–	8
Cal Poly	2	–	6	3	–	8
Sacramento State	1	–	7	3	–	9
Northern Colorado	1	–	7	1	–	11
$ – Conference champion; ^ – FCS playoff participant; Rankings from STATS Poll

The 2024 Eastern Washington Eagles football team represented Eastern Washington University during the 2024 NCAA Division I FCS football season, as a member of the Big Sky Conference. They were led by eighth-year head coach Aaron Best and played their home games at Roos Field in Cheney, Washington.

== Schedule ==
Date	Time	Opponent	Site	TV	Result	Attendance
August 29	6:00 p.m.	Monmouth*	Roos Field; Cheney, WA	ESPN+	W 42–27	4,612
September 7	4:00 p.m.	Drake*	Roos Field; Cheney, WA	ESPN+	L 32–35 ^{OT}	4,378
September 14	4:00 p.m.	at Southeastern Louisiana*	Strawberry Stadium; Hammond, LA	ESPN+	L 24–28	5,387
September 21	12:00 p.m.	at Nevada*	Mackay Stadium; Reno, NV		L 16–49	16,399
September 28	5:00 p.m.	No. 8 Montana	Roos Field; Cheney, WA (rivalry)	ESPN+	L 49–52	8,846
October 12	6:00 p.m.	at No. 18 Sacramento State	Hornet Stadium; Sacramento, CA	ESPN+	W 35–28	14,916
October 19	4:00 p.m.	No. 6 UC Davis^{†}	Roos Field; Cheney, WA	ESPN+	L 38–48	7,419
October 26	6:00 p.m.	at No. 11 Idaho	Kibbie Dome; Moscow, ID	ESPN+	L 28–38	13,277
November 2	1:00 p.m.	No. 2 Montana State	Roos Field; Cheney, WA	ESPN+	L 28–42	6,258
November 9	11:00 a.m.	at Northern Colorado	Nottingham Field; Greeley, CO	ESPN+	W 43–15	1,880
November 16	1:00 p.m.	Idaho State	Roos Field; Cheney, WA	ESPN+	W 77–42	4,854
November 23	12:00 p.m.	at No. 21 Northern Arizona	Walkup Skydome; Flagstaff, AZ	ESPN+	L 18–30	7,113
*Non-conference game; ^{†}Homecoming; Rankings from STATS Poll released prior to the game; All times are in Pacific time; Source:

== Game summaries ==
=== vs. Monmouth ===
Game One – Monmouth Hawks (0–0) at Eastern Washington Eagles (0–0) – Game summary

Quarter	1	2	3	4	Total
Hawks	7	7	0	13	27
Eagles	14	14	7	7	42

at Roos Field • Cheney, WA

- Date: Thursday August 29, 2024
- Game time: 6:00 PM PDT
- Game weather: Sunny, 77 °F (25 °C)
- Game attendance: 4,612
- Referee: Robert Quello
- TV announcers (ESPN+/SWX NW): Austin Getz, Bill Adams

Game information

First quarter

- (11:46) EWU – Efton Chism III 30-yard pass from Kekoa Visperas (Soren McKee kick) (Drive: 8 plays, 77 yards, 3:09; Eastern Washington 7–0)
- (05:35) EWU – Jared Taylor 9-yard run (Soren McKee kick) (Drive: 9 plays, 80 yards, 4:10; Eastern Washington 14–0)
- (01:42) MONM – Sone Ntoh 2-yard run (Michael Calton Jr. kick) (Drive: 8 plays, 75 yards, 3:35; Eastern Washington 14–7)

Second quarter

- (09:46) MONM – Josh Derry 48-yard pass from Derek Robertson (Michael Calton Jr. kick) (Drive: 8 plays, 95 yards, 3:55; 14-14)
- (04:23) EWU – Nolan Ulm 4-yard pass from Kekoa Visperas (Soren McKee kick) (Drive: 10 plays, 74 yards, 4:37; Eastern Washington 21-14)
- (00:23) EWU – Miles Williams 14-yard pass from Kekoa Visperas (Soren McKee kick) (Drive: 11 plays, 74 yards, 2:18; Eastern Washington 28-14)

Third quarter

- (05:51) EWU – Efton Chism 12-yard pass from Kekoa Visperas (Soren McKee kick) (Drive: 10 plays, 65 yards, 5:02; Eastern Washington 35-14)

Fourth quarter

- (12:16) EWU – Efton Chism 16-yard pass from Kekoa Visperas (Soren McKee kick) (Drive: 13 plays, 76 yards, 6:25; Eastern Washington 42-14)
- (11:15) MONM – Jack Neri 21-yard pass from Derek Robertson (Michael Calton Jr. kick) (Drive: 4 plays, 75 yards, 1:01; Eastern Washington 42-21)
- (11:15) MONM – Maxwell James 19-yard pass from Derek Robertson (Two-point pass conversion failed) (Drive: 9 plays, 89 yards, 2:34; Eastern Washington 42-27)

Statistics	MONM	EWU
First downs	24	31
Total yards	439	547
Rushing yards	49	265
Passing yards	390	282
Passing: Comp–Att–Int	27-42-1	26-29-0
Time of possession	22:42	37:18

Team	Category	Player	Statistics
Monmouth	Passing	Derek Robertson	27/42, 390 yards, 3 TD, INT
Monmouth	Rushing	Makhi Green	6 carries, 17 yards
Monmouth	Receiving	TJ Speight	5 receptions, 97 yards
Eastern Washington	Passing	Kekoa Visperas	25/28, 275 yards, 5 TD
Eastern Washington	Rushing	Tuna Altahir	16 carries, 108 yards
Eastern Washington	Receiving	Efton Chism III	12 receptions, 173 yards, 3 TD

=== vs. Drake ===
Game Two – Drake Bulldogs (0–0) at Eastern Washington Eagles (1–0) – Game summary

Quarter	1	2	3	4	OT	Total
Bulldogs	0	13	7	9	6	35
Eagles	7	7	7	8	3	32

at Roos Field • Cheney, WA

- Date: Saturday September 7, 2024
- Game time: 4:00 PM PDT
- Game weather: Sunny • Temperature: 94 °F (34 °C) • Wind: N at 5 miles per hour (8.0 km/h)
- Game attendance: 4,378
- Referee: Jim Crowley
- TV announcers (ESPN+): Austin Getz (play-by-play) and Adam Shackleford (analyst)

Game information

First quarter

- 9:13 EWU – Tuna Altahir 1-yard run (Soren McKee kick) (Drive: 13 plays, 75 yards, 5:47; EWU 7–0)

Second quarter

- 12:33 Drake – Luke Woodson 1-yard run (Shane Dunning kick) (Drive: 8 plays, 86 yards, 4:06; Tied 7–7)
- 4:06 Drake – Shane Dunning 47-yard field goal (Drive: 6 plays, 23 yards, 2:29; Drake 10–7)
- 1:42 EWU – Efton Chism III 1-yard pass from Michael Wortham (Soren McKee kick) (Drive: 7 plays, 75 yards, 2:24; EWU 14–10)
- 0:00 Drake – Shane Dunning 44-yard field goal (Drive: 11 plays, 48 yards, 1:42; EWU 14–13)

Third quarter

- 13:11 Drake – Parker Olthoff 3-yard pass from Luke Bailey (Shane Dunning kick) (Drive: 3 plays, 76 yards, 1:45; Drake 20–14)
- 7:42 EWU – Michael Wortham 2-yard run (Soren McKee kick) (Drive: 11 plays, 83 yards, 5:25; EWU 21–20)

Fourth quarter

- 12:19 Drake – Darian Boyland 1-yard run (Luke Bailey pass failed) (Drive: 12 plays, 81 yards, 2:42; Drake 26–21)
- 7:42 EWU – Michael Wortham 6-yard run (Keikoa Visperis run) (Drive: 10 plays, 63 yards, 4:23; EWU 29–26)
- 4:29 Drake – Shane Dunning 41-yard field goal (Drive: 7 plays, 51 yards, 3:13; Tied 29–29)

Overtime

- EWU – Soren McKee 36-yard field goal (Drive: 4 plays, 6 yards; EWU 32–29)
- Drake – Trey Radocha 14-yard pass from Luke Bailey(Drive: 4 plays, 25 yards; Drake 35–32)

Statistics	DRKE	EWU
First downs	25	23
Total yards	460	385
Rushing yards	67	206
Passing yards	393	179
Passing: Comp–Att–Int	29–49–0	23–30–0
Time of possession	24:23	35:37

Team	Category	Player	Statistics
Drake	Passing	Luke Bailey	28/48, 380 yards, 2 TD
Drake	Rushing	Dorian Boyland	8 carries, 25 yards, TD
Drake	Receiving	Mitchell January	5 receptions, 101 yards
Eastern Washington	Passing	Kekoa Visperas	21/26, 177 yards
Eastern Washington	Rushing	Tuna Altahir	12 carries, 94 yards, TD
Eastern Washington	Receiving	Efton Chism III	9 receptions, 65 yards, TD

=== at Southeastern Louisiana ===
Game Three – Eastern Washington Eagles (1–1) vs Southeastern Louisiana Lions (0–2) – Game summary

Quarter	1	2	3	4	Total
Eagles	7	14	3	0	24
Lions	7	14	0	7	28

at Strawberry Stadium • Hammond, LA

- Date: Saturday September 14, 2024
- Game time: 6:03 PM CDT
- Game weather: 80 °F (27 °C) • Wind: SW 5mph • Weather: Cloudy
- Game attendance: 5,387
- TV announcers (ESPN+): Lucas Hill

Game information

First quarter
Second quarter
Third quarter
Fourth quarter

Statistics	EWU	SELA
First downs	16	25
Total yards	333	341
Rushing yards	90	253
Passing yards	243	88
Passing: Comp–Att–Int	21–28–0	15–24–0
Time of possession	25:41	34:19

Team	Category	Player	Statistics
Eastern Washington	Passing	Kekoa Visperas	21/28, 243 yards, 1 TD
Eastern Washington	Rushing	Malik Dotson	11 carries, 47 yards, 2 TD
Eastern Washington	Receiving	Efton Chism III	7 receptions, 83 yards
Southeastern Louisiana	Passing	Eli Sawyer	12/21, 72 yards, 2 TD
Southeastern Louisiana	Rushing	Antonio Martin, Jr.	28 carries, 149 yards
Southeastern Louisiana	Receiving	Darius Lewis	6 receptions, 32 yards, 1 TD

=== at Nevada (FBS) ===
Game Four – Eastern Washington Eagles (1–2) vs Nevada Wolf Pack (FBS) (1–3) – Game summary

Quarter	1	2	3	4	Total
Eagles	0	3	0	13	16
Wolf Pack (FBS)	14	7	14	14	49

at Mackay Stadium • Reno, NV

- Date: Saturday September 21, 2024
- Game time: 12:00 PM PDT
- Game weather: Sunny • Temperature: 72 °F (22 °C) • Wind: E at 2 miles per hour (3.2 km/h)
- Game attendance: 16,399
- Referee: Michael Cuttone
- TV announcers (NSN/Mountain West Network): Alex Margulies (play-by-play) and Shannon Kelly (sideline reporter)

Game information

First quarter

- (6:46) NEV - Patrick Garwo III 9 yd run, Matthew Killam kick (Drive: 9 plays, 73 yards, 4:58; Nevada 7–0)
- (1:48) NEV - Marcus Bellon 4 yd pass from Brendon Lewis, Matthew Killam kick (Drive: 7 plays, 58 yards, 4:04; Nevada 14–0)

Second quarter

- (9:19) EWU - Soren McKee 19–yard field goal (Drive: 15 plays, 74 yards, 7:29; Nevada 14–3)
- (0:48) NEV - Patrick Garwo III 7 yd run, Matthew Killam kick (Drive: 8 plays, 75 yards, 1:24; Nevada 21–3)

Third quarter

- (9:43) NEV - Patrick Garwo III 1 yd run, Matthew Killam kick (Drive: 10 plays, 75 yards, 5:17; Nevada 28–3)
- (0:43) NEV - Jaden Smith 24 yd pass from Brendon Lewis, Matthew Killam kick (Drive: 12 plays, 65 yards, 5:27; Nevada 35–3)

Fourth quarter

- (12:33) EWU - Malik Dotson 2 yd run, rush fail (Drive: 8 plays, 75 yards, 3:10; Nevada 35–9)
- (9:46) NEV - Savion Red 31 yd run, Matthew Killam kick (Drive: 5 plays, 75 yards, 2:44; Nevada 42–9)
- (8:24) EWU - Noah Cronquist 42 Yd pass from Michael Wortham, Soren McKee kick (Drive: 4 plays, 86 yards, 1:18; Nevada 42–16)
- (1:46) NEV - Savion Red 3 yd run, Matthew Killam kick (Drive: 12 plays, 80 yards, 6:32; Nevada 49–16)

Statistics	EWU	NEV
First downs	21	27
Total yards	348	534
Rushing yards	170	320
Passing yards	178	214
Passing: Comp–Att–Int	21-30-1	18-24-1
Time of possession	26:50	33:10

Team	Category	Player	Statistics
Eastern Washington	Passing	Kekoa Visperas	15/22, 116 yards
Eastern Washington	Rushing	Jared Taylor	12 carries, 73 yards
Eastern Washington	Receiving	Efton Chism III	11 receptions, 85 yards
Nevada	Passing	Brendon Lewis	16/22, 193 yards, 2 TD, INT
Nevada	Rushing	Savion Red	10 carries, 117 yards, 2 TD
Nevada	Receiving	Marcus Bellon	5 receptions, 83 yards, TD

=== vs. No. 8 Montana (EWU–UM Governors Cup) ===
Game Five – No. 8 Montana Grizzlies (3–1) at Eastern Washington Eagles (1–3) – Game summary

Quarter	1	2	3	4	Total
No. 8 Grizzlies	10	21	7	14	52
Eagles	7	7	7	28	49

at Roos Field • Cheney, WA

- Date: Saturday September 28, 2024
- Game time: 5:00 PM PDT
- Game weather: 0 °F (−18 °C)
- TV announcers (ESPN+/MTN/SWX NW): Jay Kohn, Marty Mornhinweg, Kyle Hanson

Game information

First quarter
Second quarter
Third quarter
Fourth quarter

Statistics	MONT	EWU
First downs	28	31
Total yards	701	551
Rushing yards	337	263
Passing yards	364	288
Passing: Comp–Att–Int	30-43-0	23-42-0
Time of possession	33:11	26:49

Team	Category	Player	Statistics
Montana	Passing	Logan Fife	30-42 364 Yards 5 TD
Montana	Rushing	Nick Ostmo	15 Carries 160 Yards 1 TD
Montana	Receiving	Junior Bergen	7 Receptions 150 Yards 1 TD
Eastern Washington	Passing	Kekoa Visperas	22-38 265 Yards 4 TD
Eastern Washington	Rushing	Mailk Dotson	14 Carries 77 Yards
Eastern Washington	Receiving	Efton Chism III	8 Receptions 107 Yards 3 TD

=== at No. 18 Sacramento State ===
Game Six – Eastern Washington Eagles (1–4) vs No. 18 Sacramento State Hornets (2–3) – Game summary

Quarter	1	2	3	4	Total
Eagles	7	7	14	7	35
No. 18 Hornets	7	14	0	7	28

at Hornet Stadium • Sacramento, CA

- Date: Saturday October 12, 2024
- Game time: 6:00 PM PDT
- Game weather: 0 °F (−18 °C)
- TV announcers (ESPN+/KMAX): Jason Ross Jr. (play-by-play) and Darren Arbet (analyst)

Game information

First quarter
Second quarter
Third quarter
Fourth quarter

Statistics	EWU	SAC
First downs	28	22
Total yards	441	365
Rushing yards	286	127
Passing yards	155	238
Passing: Comp–Att–Int	16-18-0	21-35-1
Time of possession	32:59	27:01

Team	Category	Player	Statistics
Eastern Washington	Passing	Kekoa Visperas	15-17 141 yards 1 TD
Eastern Washington	Rushing	Tuna Altahir	16 Carries 102 Yards 1 TD
Eastern Washington	Receiving	Efton Chism III	7 Receptions 67 Yards
Sacramento State	Passing	Carson Conklin	21-35 238 yards 4 TD 1 INT
Sacramento State	Rushing	Elijah Tau-Tolliver	18 Carries 94 Yards
Sacramento State	Receiving	Jared Gipson	4 Receptions 68 Yards 1 TD

=== vs. No. 6 UC Davis ===
Game Seven – No. 6 UC Davis Aggies (6–1) at Eastern Washington Eagles (2–4) – Game summary

Quarter	1	2	3	4	Total
No. 6 Aggies	0	28	3	17	48
Eagles	3	6	12	17	38

at Roos Field • Cheney, WA

- Date: Saturday October 19, 2024
- Game time: 4:00 PM PDT
- Game weather: Cloudy • Temperature: 64 °F (18 °C) • Wind: SW 17 miles per hour (27 km/h)
- Game attendance: 7,419
- Referee: Jeff Rink
- TV announcers (ESPN+/SWX NW): Austin Getz (play-by-play) and Bill Ames (analyst)

Game information

First quarter
Second quarter
Third quarter
Fourth quarter

Statistics	UCD	EWU
First downs	26	18
Total yards	549	402
Rushing yards	220	81
Passing yards	329	321
Passing: Comp–Att–Int	18–28–0	31–43–0
Time of possession	27:25	32:35

Team	Category	Player	Statistics
UC Davis	Passing	Miles Hastings	18/28, 329 yards, 4 TD
UC Davis	Rushing	Lan Larison	29 carries, 182 yards, TD
UC Davis	Receiving	Samuel Gbatu Jr.	4 receptions, 134 yards, 2 TD
Eastern Washington	Passing	Kekoa Visperas	30/42, 319 yards. 2 TD
Eastern Washington	Rushing	Kekoa Visperas	14 carries, 37 yards, 2 TD
Eastern Washington	Receiving	Efton Chism III	15 receptions, 170 yards, 2 TD

=== at No. 11 Idaho ===
Game Eight – Eastern Washington Eagles (2–5) vs No. 11 Idaho Vandals (5–3) – Game summary

Quarter	1	2	3	4	Total
Eagles	7	6	0	14	27
No. 11 Vandals	7	10	7	15	39

at Kibbie Dome • Moscow, ID

- Date: Saturday October 26, 2024
- Game time: 6:00 PM PDT
- Game weather: None (played indoors)
- TV announcers (ESPN+/SWX NW): Austin Getz, Ty Graham

Game information

First quarter

- IDHO – Alex Moore 4-yard pass from Jack Layne (Cameron Pope kick), 9:32. Vandals 7–0.
- EWU – Kekoa Visperas 1-yard run (Soren McKee kick), 5:35. Tied 7–7.

Second quarter

- IDHO – Jordan Dwyer 15-yard pass from Jack Layne (Cameron Pope kick), 14:51. Vandals 14–7.
- EWU – Soren McKee 24-yard field goal, 12:15. Vandals 14–10.
- IDHO – Cameron Pope 34-yard field goal, 4:25. Vandals 17–10.
- EWU – Soren McKee 44-yard field goal, 1:24. Vandals 17–13.

Third quarter

- IDHO – Deshaun Buchanan 1-yard run (Cameron Pope kick), 4:11. Vandals 24–13.

Fourth quarter

- IDHO – Rocco Koch 3-yard run (Cameron Pope kick), 14:25. Vandals 31–13.
- EWU – JP Murphy 3-yard pass from Jared Taylor (Jared Taylor pass to Efton Chism III for 2-point conversion), 8:18. Vandals 31–21.
- IDHO – Deshaun Buchanan 12-yard run (Cameron Pope kick), 5:06. Vandals 38–21.
- EWU – Michael Wortham 100-yard kickoff return (Soren McKee kick), 4:54. Vandals 38–28.

Statistics	EWU	IDHO
First downs	20	24
Total yards	388	487
Rushing yards	215	252
Passing yards	173	235
Passing: Comp–Att–Int	14-18-0	17-28-1
Time of possession	26:42	33:18

Team	Category	Player	Statistics
Eastern Washington	Passing	Kekoa Visperas	11-14 156 Yards
Eastern Washington	Rushing	Tuna Altahir	13 Carries 67 Yards
Eastern Washington	Receiving	Efton Chism III	7 Receptions 114 Yards
Idaho	Passing	Jack Layne	17-28 235 Yards 2 TD 1 INT
Idaho	Rushing	Deshaun Buchanan	8 Carries 116 Yards 2 TD
Idaho	Receiving	Jordan Dwyer	4 Receptions 78 Yards 1 TD

=== vs. No. 2 Montana State ===
Game Nine – No. 2 Montana State Bobcats (8–0) at Eastern Washington Eagles (2–6) – Game summary

Quarter	1	2	3	4	Total
No. 2 Bobcats	14	14	7	7	42
Eagles	7	7	14	0	28

at Roos Field • Cheney, WA

- Date: Saturday November 2, 2024
- Game time: 2:00 PM MDT
- Game weather: 0 °F (−18 °C)
- TV announcers (ESPN+/MTN): Ben Creighton, Ty Gregorak, Grace Lawrence

Game information

First quarter

- (7:21) MTST - Scottre Humphrey 1-yard run (Myles Sansted kick) (Montana State 7-0)
- (7:06) MTST - Taco Dowler 19-yard pass from Tommy Mellott (Myles Sansted kick) (Montana State 14-0)
- (0:57) EWU - Efton Chism III 4-yard pass from Jared Taylor (Soren McKee kick) (Montana State 14-7)

Second quarter

- (12:20) MTST - Adam Jones 20-yard run (Myles Sansted kick) (Montana State 21-7)
- (11:35) EWU - Michael Wortham 75-yard run (Soren McKee kick) (Montana State 21-14)
- (1:55) MTST - Scottre Humphrey 4-yard run (Myles Sansted kick) (Montana State 28-14)

Third quarter

- (9:01) EWU - Tuna Altahir 3-yard pass from Jared Taylor (Soren McKee kick) (Montana State 28-21)
- (1:26) EWU - Tuna Altahir 11-yard run (Soren McKee kick) (Tied 28-28)
- (1:07) MTST - Tommy Mellott 76-yard run (Myles Sansted kick) (Montana State 35-28)

Fourth quarter

- (3:15) MTST - Ty McCullouch 61-yard pass from Tommy Mellott (Montana State 42-28)

Statistics	MTST	EWU
First downs	22	18
Total yards	497	393
Rushing yards	316	225
Passing yards	181	168
Passing: Comp–Att–Int	13-20-1	22-30-1
Time of possession	32:04	27:56

Team	Category	Player	Statistics
Montana State	Passing	Tommy Mellott	13-20 181 Yards 2 TD 1 INT
Montana State	Rushing	Tommy Mellott	6 Carries 125 Yards 1 TD
Montana State	Receiving	Ty McCullouch	2 Receptions 68 Yards 1 TD
Eastern Washington	Passing	Jared Taylor	20-27 144 Yards 2 TD 1 INT
Eastern Washington	Rushing	Michael Wortham	2 Carries 92 Yards 1 TD
Eastern Washington	Receiving	Efton Chism III	9 Receptions 78 Yards 1 TD

=== at Northern Colorado ===
Game Ten – Eastern Washington Eagles (2–7) vs Northern Colorado Bears (1–8) – Game summary

Quarter	1	2	3	4	Total
Eagles	22	7	7	7	43
Bears	0	8	7	0	15

at Nottingham Field • Greeley, CO

- Date: Saturday November 9, 2024
- Game time: 11:00 AM PST
- Game attendance: 1,880
- TV announcers (ESPN+): Christian Saez, Nick Hager

Game information

First quarter
Second quarter
Third quarter
Fourth quarter

Statistics	EWU	UNCO
First downs	33	12
Total yards	538	323
Rushing yards	339	48
Passing yards	199	275
Passing: Comp–Att–Int	16-24-1	13-26-0
Time of possession	43:38	16:22

Team	Category	Player	Statistics
Eastern Washington	Passing	Kekoa Visperas	13-20 179 Yards 3 TD 1 INT
Eastern Washington	Rushing	Malik Dotson	17 Carries 125 Yards
Eastern Washington	Receiving	Efton Chism III	10 Receptions 93 Yards 2 TD
Northern Colorado	Passing	Peter Costelli	11-23 258 Yards 2 TD
Northern Colorado	Rushing	Jacquez Robertson	2 Carries 17 Yards
Northern Colorado	Receiving	Carver Cheeks	4 Receptions 136 Yards 1 TD

=== vs. Idaho State ===
Game Eleven – Idaho State Bengals (5–5) at Eastern Washington Eagles (3–7) – Game summary

Quarter	1	2	3	4	Total
Bengals	14	14	7	7	42
Eagles	21	28	7	21	77

at Roos Field • Cheney, WA

- Date: Saturday November 16, 2024
- Game time: 1:00 PM PST
- Game weather: Cloudy • Temperature: 38 °F (3 °C) • Wind: SW at 11 miles per hour (18 km/h)
- Game attendance: 4,854
- Referee: Jim Crowley
- TV announcers (ESPN+/SWX NW): Bob Castle (play-by-play) and Bill Ames (analyst)

Game information

First quarter
Second quarter
Third quarter
Fourth quarter

Statistics	IDST	EWU
First downs	30	37
Total yards	484	704
Rushing yards	114	478
Passing yards	370	226
Passing: Comp–Att–Int	37-54-1	15-15-0
Time of possession	30:05	29:55

Team	Category	Player	Statistics
Idaho State	Passing	Kobe Tracy	37-54 370 Yards 4 TD 1 INT
Idaho State	Rushing	Kobe Tracy	9 Carries 38 Yards
Idaho State	Receiving	Jeff Weimer	14 Receptions 134 Yards
Eastern Washington	Passing	Kekoa Visperas	14-14 206 Yards 1 TD
Eastern Washington	Rushing	Jared Taylor	18 Carries 160 Yards 3 TD
Eastern Washington	Receiving	Efton Chism III	12 Receptions 157 Yards 1 TD

=== at No. 21 Northern Arizona ===
Game Twelve – Eastern Washington Eagles (4–7) vs No. 21 Northern Arizona Lumberjacks (7–4) – Game summary

Quarter	1	2	3	4	Total
Eagles	0	7	11	0	18
No. 21 Lumberjacks	7	7	3	13	30

at Walkup Skydome • Flagstaff, AZ

- Date: Saturday November 23, 2024
- Game time: 12:00 PM PST
- Game weather: None (played indoors)
- Game attendance: 7,113
- Referee: Michael Bezner
- TV announcers (ESPN+): Mitch Strohman (play-by-play), Kevin Stephens (analyst) and Ava Nichols (sideline)

Game information

First quarter

- (0:05) NAU – Kolbe Katsis 75-yard pass from Ty Pennington, Samuel Hunsaker kick (Drive: 3 plays, 86 yards, 1:35; Northern Arizona 7–0)

Second quarter

- (9:30) EWU – Jett Carpenter 2-yard pass from Jared Taylor, Soren McKee kick (Drive: 11 plays, 50 yards, 5:30; Tied 7–7)
- (5:40) NAU – Tay Lanier 40-yard pass from Isaiah Eastman, Samuel Hunsaker kick (Drive: 7 plays, 90 yards, 3:43; Northern Arizona 14–7)

Third quarter

- (14:53) EWU – Matthew Brown 0-yard safety (Northern Arizona 14–9)
- (10:52) EWU – Efton Chism III 67-yard pass from Jared Taylor (Drive: 1 play, 67 yards, 0:18; Eastern Washington 15–14)
- (8:40) NAU – Samuel Hunsaker 21-yard field goal (Drive: 7 plays, 72 yards, 2:12; Northern Arizona 17–15)
- (2:45) EWU – Soren McKee 31-yard field goal (Drive: 13 plays, 62 yards, 5:48; Eastern Washington 18–17)

Fourth quarter

- (13:53) NAU – Seth Crowell 6-yard run (Drive: 7 plays, 61 yards, 3:46; Northern Arizona 23–18)
- (2:17) NAU – Ty Pennington 12-yard run, Samuel Hunsaker kick (Drive: 12 plays, 66 yards, 6:29; Northern Arizona 30–18)

Statistics	EWU	NAU
First downs	16	28
Total yards	301	539
Rushing yards	134	187
Passing yards	167	352
Passing: Comp–Att–Int	19–27–1	16–30–0
Time of possession	28:45	31:15

Team	Category	Player	Statistics
Eastern Washington	Passing	Kekoa Visperas	15/22, 94 yards, INT
Eastern Washington	Rushing	Kekoa Visperas	6 carries, 62 yards
Eastern Washington	Receiving	Efton Chism III	13 receptions, 119 yards, TD
Northern Arizona	Passing	Ty Pennington	15/29, 312 yards, TD
Northern Arizona	Rushing	Seth Cromwell	20 carries, 112 yards, TD
Northern Arizona	Receiving	Kolbe Katsis	3 receptions, 130 yards, TD
