= 2024 Cal Poly Mustangs football team =

American college football season

2024 Cal Poly Mustangs football
- Conference: Big Sky Conference
- Record: 3–8 (2–6 Big Sky)
- Head coach: Paul Wulff (2nd season)
- Co-offensive coordinators: Timm Rosenbach (1st season); Erik Meyer (1st season)
- Offensive scheme: Spread triple option
- Defensive coordinator: Cody vonAppen (3rd season)
- Base defense: 4–3
- Home stadium: Mustang Memorial Field

2024 Big Sky Conference football standings
| | Conf. | | | Overall |
| Team | W | | L | W | | L |
|---|---|---|---|---|---|---|
| No. 2 Montana State $^ | 8 | – | 0 | 15 | – | 1 |
| No. 5 UC Davis ^ | 7 | – | 1 | 11 | – | 3 |
| No. 7 Idaho ^ | 6 | – | 2 | 10 | – | 4 |
| No. 22 Northern Arizona ^ | 6 | – | 2 | 8 | – | 5 |
| No. 10 Montana ^ | 5 | – | 3 | 9 | – | 5 |
| Idaho State | 3 | – | 5 | 5 | – | 7 |
| Eastern Washington | 3 | – | 5 | 4 | – | 8 |
| Weber State | 3 | – | 5 | 4 | – | 8 |
| Portland State | 3 | – | 5 | 3 | – | 8 |
| Cal Poly | 2 | – | 6 | 3 | – | 8 |
| Sacramento State | 1 | – | 7 | 3 | – | 9 |
| Northern Colorado | 1 | – | 7 | 1 | – | 11 |
$ – Conference champion; ^ – FCS playoff participant; Rankings from STATS Poll

The 2024 Cal Poly Mustangs football team represented the California Polytechnic State University, San Luis Obispo as a member of the Big Sky Conference during the 2024 NCAA Division I FCS football season. Led by second-year head coach Paul Wulff, the Mustangs played home games at Mustang Memorial Field in San Luis Obispo, California.

== Schedule ==
| Date | Time | Opponent | Site | TV | Result | Attendance |
|---|---|---|---|---|---|---|
| August 31 | 5:00 p.m. | at San Diego* | Torero Stadium; San Diego, CA | ESPN+ | L 21–27 | 5,792 |
| September 7 | 4:00 p.m. | at Stanford* | Stanford Stadium; Stanford, CA | ACCNX | L 7–41 | 22,634 |
| September 14 | 5:00 p.m. | Western Oregon* | Mustang Memorial Field; San Luis Obispo, CA | ESPN+ | W 31–14 | 7,728 |
| September 28 | 12:00 p.m. | at Northern Colorado | Nottingham Field; Greeley, CO | ESPN+ | W 28–7 | 4,495 |
| October 5 | 5:00 p.m. | Idaho State^{†} | Mustang Memorial Field; San Luis Obispo, CA | ESPN+ | L 38–41 | 8,429 |
| October 12 | 4:00 p.m. | at No. 6 UC Davis | UC Davis Health Stadium; Davis, CA (rivalry) | ESPN+ | L 10–56 | 10,515 |
| October 19 | 1:00 p.m. | at No. 13 Idaho | Kibbie Dome; Moscow, ID | ESPN+ | L 29–34 | 8,873 |
| November 2 | 2:00 p.m. | No. 8 Montana | Mustang Memorial Field; San Luis Obispo, CA | KSBY/ESPN+ | L 7–42 | 10,095 |
| November 9 | 5:00 p.m. | Northern Arizona | Mustang Memorial Field; San Luis Obispo, CA | ESPN+ | L 14–31 | 6,231 |
| November 16 | 2:00 p.m. | Sacramento State | Mustang Memorial Field; San Luis Obispo, CA | ESPN+ | W 26–23 | 4,742 |
| November 23 | 12:00 p.m. | at Weber State | Stewart Stadium; Ogden, UT | ESPN+ | L 17–28 | 4,279 |
*Non-conference game; ^{†}Homecoming; Rankings from STATS Poll released prior to the game; All times are in Pacific time

== Game summaries ==
=== at San Diego ===
Cal Poly Mustangs (0–0) at San Diego Toreros (0–0) – Game summary

| Quarter | 1 | 2 | 3 | 4 | Total |
|---|---|---|---|---|---|
| Mustangs | 0 | 7 | 7 | 7 | 21 |
| Toreros | 10 | 0 | 7 | 10 | 27 |

at Torero Stadium • San Diego, California

- Date: August 31
- Game time: 5:00 p.m. PDT
- TV announcers (ESPN+): Jack Cronin, Reid Sinnett

| Statistics | CP | USD |
|---|---|---|
| First downs | | |
| Plays–yards | | |
| Rushes–yards | | |
| Passing yards | | |
| Passing: comp–att–int | | |
| Turnovers | | |
| Time of possession | | |

| Team | Category | Player | Statistics |
|---|---|---|---|
| Cal Poly | Passing | | |
| Cal Poly | Rushing | | |
| Cal Poly | Receiving | | |
| San Diego | Passing | | |
| San Diego | Rushing | | |
| San Diego | Receiving | | |

=== at Stanford ===
Cal Poly Mustangs (0–1) at Stanford Cardinal (FBS) (0–1) – Game summary

| Quarter | 1 | 2 | 3 | 4 | Total |
|---|---|---|---|---|---|
| Mustangs | 0 | 7 | 0 | 0 | 7 |
| Cardinal (FBS) | 7 | 7 | 17 | 10 | 41 |

at Stanford Stadium • Stanford, California

- Date: September 7
- Game time: 4:00 p.m. PDT
- Game weather: Sunny
- Game attendance: 22,634
- Referee: Nate Black
- TV announcers (ACCNX): Roxy Bernstein, Michael Bumpus, and Sherree Burruss

Game information

First quarter

- (0:00) STAN – Mudia Reuben 5-yard pass from Ashton Daniels, Emmet Kenney kick (Drive: 8 plays, 78 yards, 5:03; Stanford 7–0)

Second quarter

- (12:09) CP – Jake Woods 22-yard pass from Michael Briscoe, Gianluca Dimauro kick (Drive: 6 plays, 75 yards, 2:51; Tied 7–7)
- (0:21) STAN – Justin Lamson 2-yard run, Emmet Kenney kick (Drive: 6 plays, 73 yards, 1:11; Stanford 14–7)

Third quarter

- (11:52) STAN – Tiger Bachmeier 90-yard punt return, Emmet Kenney kick (Stanford 21–7)
- (5:26) STAN – Emmet Kenney 32-yard field goal (Drive: 9 plays, 46 yards, 4:17; Stanford 24–7)
- (2:02) STAN – Sam Roush 5-yard pass from Ashton Daniels, Emmet Kenney kick (Drive: 5 plays, 21 yards, 2:47; Stanford 31–7)

Fourth quarter

- (10:02) STAN – Ismael Cisse 12-yard pass from Elijah Brown, Emmet Kenney kick (Drive: 7 plays, 85 yards, 4:08; Stanford 31–7)
- (1:55) STAN – Emmet Kenney 43-yard field goal (Drive: 8 plays, 60 yards, 4:18; Stanford 41–7)

| Statistics | CP | STAN |
|---|---|---|
| First downs | 13 | 22 |
| Plays–yards | 50–229 | 62–437 |
| Rushes–yards | 20–25 | 32–119 |
| Passing yards | 204 | 318 |
| Passing: comp–att–int | 21–30–1 | 26–30–0 |
| Turnovers | 1 | 1 |
| Time of possession | 25:37 | 34:23 |

| Team | Category | Player | Statistics |
|---|---|---|---|
| Cal Poly | Passing | Bo Kelly | 17/25, 149 yards, INT |
| Cal Poly | Rushing | Aiden Ramos | 8 carries, 22 yards |
| Cal Poly | Receiving | Michael Briscoe | 3 receptions, 47 yards |
| Stanford | Passing | Ashton Daniels | 19/23, 221 yards, 2 TD |
| Stanford | Rushing | Chris Davis Jr. | 6 carries, 53 yards |
| Stanford | Receiving | Sedrick Irvin | 2 receptions, 92 yards |

=== vs Western Oregon ===
Western Oregon Wolves (DII) vs Cal Poly Mustangs – Game summary

| Quarter | 1 | 2 | 3 | 4 | Total |
|---|---|---|---|---|---|
| Wolves (DII) | 0 | 6 | 8 | 0 | 14 |
| Mustangs | 7 | 7 | 14 | 3 | 31 |

at Mustang Memorial Field • San Luis Obispo, California

- Date: September 14
- Game time: 8:00
- TV announcers (ESPN+): Chris Sylvester, John Kane

| Statistics | WOR | CP |
|---|---|---|
| First downs | | |
| Plays–yards | | |
| Rushes–yards | | |
| Passing yards | | |
| Passing: comp–att–int | | |
| Turnovers | | |
| Time of possession | | |

| Team | Category | Player | Statistics |
|---|---|---|---|
| Western Oregon | Passing | | |
| Western Oregon | Rushing | | |
| Western Oregon | Receiving | | |
| Cal Poly | Passing | | |
| Cal Poly | Rushing | | |
| Cal Poly | Receiving | | |

=== at Northern Colorado ===
Cal Poly Mustangs at Northern Colorado Bears – Game summary

| Quarter | 1 | 2 | 3 | 4 | Total |
|---|---|---|---|---|---|
| Mustangs | 14 | 0 | 7 | 7 | 28 |
| Bears | 0 | 0 | 7 | 0 | 7 |

at Nottingham Field • Greeley, Colorado

- Date: September 28
- Game time: 3:00
- TV announcers (ESPN+): Christian Saez, Nick Hager

| Statistics | CP | UNCO |
|---|---|---|
| First downs | | |
| Plays–yards | | |
| Rushes–yards | | |
| Passing yards | | |
| Passing: comp–att–int | | |
| Turnovers | | |
| Time of possession | | |

| Team | Category | Player | Statistics |
|---|---|---|---|
| Cal Poly | Passing | | |
| Cal Poly | Rushing | | |
| Cal Poly | Receiving | | |
| Northern Colorado | Passing | | |
| Northern Colorado | Rushing | | |
| Northern Colorado | Receiving | | |

=== vs Idaho State ===
Idaho State Bengals vs Cal Poly Mustangs – Game summary

| Quarter | 1 | 2 | Total |
|---|---|---|---|
| Bengals | | | 0 |
| Mustangs | | | 0 |

at Mustang Memorial Field • San Luis Obispo, California

- Date: October 5
- Game time: 8:00
- TV announcers (ESPN+): Chris Sylvester, John Kane

| Statistics | IDST | CP |
|---|---|---|
| First downs | | |
| Plays–yards | | |
| Rushes–yards | | |
| Passing yards | | |
| Passing: comp–att–int | | |
| Turnovers | | |
| Time of possession | | |

| Team | Category | Player | Statistics |
|---|---|---|---|
| Idaho State | Passing | | |
| Idaho State | Rushing | | |
| Idaho State | Receiving | | |
| Cal Poly | Passing | | |
| Cal Poly | Rushing | | |
| Cal Poly | Receiving | | |

=== at No. 6 UC Davis ===
Cal Poly Mustangs at No. 6 UC Davis Aggies – Game summary

| Quarter | 1 | 2 | Total |
|---|---|---|---|
| Mustangs | | | 0 |
| No. 6 Aggies | | | 0 |

at UC Davis Health Stadium • Davis, California

- Date: October 12
- Game time: 7:00
- TV announcers (ESPN+/KQCA): Scott Marsh, Scott Gordon

| Statistics | CP | UCD |
|---|---|---|
| First downs | | |
| Plays–yards | | |
| Rushes–yards | | |
| Passing yards | | |
| Passing: comp–att–int | | |
| Turnovers | | |
| Time of possession | | |

| Team | Category | Player | Statistics |
|---|---|---|---|
| Cal Poly | Passing | | |
| Cal Poly | Rushing | | |
| Cal Poly | Receiving | | |
| UC Davis | Passing | | |
| UC Davis | Rushing | | |
| UC Davis | Receiving | | |

=== at No. 13 Idaho ===
Cal Poly Mustangs at No. 13 Idaho Vandals – Game summary

| Quarter | 1 | 2 | Total |
|---|---|---|---|
| Mustangs | | | 0 |
| No. 13 Vandals | | | 0 |

at Kibbie Dome • Moscow, Idaho

- Date: October 19
- Game time: 4:00
- TV announcers (ESPN+/SWX NW): Bob Castle, Brian Strandley

| Statistics | CP | IDHO |
|---|---|---|
| First downs | | |
| Plays–yards | | |
| Rushes–yards | | |
| Passing yards | | |
| Passing: comp–att–int | | |
| Turnovers | | |
| Time of possession | | |

| Team | Category | Player | Statistics |
|---|---|---|---|
| Cal Poly | Passing | | |
| Cal Poly | Rushing | | |
| Cal Poly | Receiving | | |
| Idaho | Passing | | |
| Idaho | Rushing | | |
| Idaho | Receiving | | |

=== vs No. 8 Montana ===
No. 8 Montana Grizzlies vs Cal Poly Mustangs – Game summary

| Quarter | 1 | 2 | Total |
|---|---|---|---|
| No. 8 Grizzlies | | | 0 |
| Mustangs | | | 0 |

at Mustang Memorial Field • San Luis Obispo, California

- Date: November 2
- Game time: 5:00
- TV announcers (ESPN+/MTN): Jay Kohn, Marty Mornhinweg, Kyle Hanson

| Statistics | MONT | CP |
|---|---|---|
| First downs | | |
| Plays–yards | | |
| Rushes–yards | | |
| Passing yards | | |
| Passing: comp–att–int | | |
| Turnovers | | |
| Time of possession | | |

| Team | Category | Player | Statistics |
|---|---|---|---|
| Montana | Passing | | |
| Montana | Rushing | | |
| Montana | Receiving | | |
| Cal Poly | Passing | | |
| Cal Poly | Rushing | | |
| Cal Poly | Receiving | | |

=== vs Northern Arizona ===
Northern Arizona Lumberjacks vs Cal Poly Mustangs – Game summary

| Quarter | 1 | 2 | Total |
|---|---|---|---|
| Lumberjacks | | | 0 |
| Mustangs | | | 0 |

at Mustang Memorial Field • San Luis Obispo, California

- Date: November 9
- Game time: 8:00
- TV announcers (ESPN+): Chris Sylvester, John Kane

| Statistics | NAU | CP |
|---|---|---|
| First downs | | |
| Plays–yards | | |
| Rushes–yards | | |
| Passing yards | | |
| Passing: comp–att–int | | |
| Turnovers | | |
| Time of possession | | |

| Team | Category | Player | Statistics |
|---|---|---|---|
| Northern Arizona | Passing | | |
| Northern Arizona | Rushing | | |
| Northern Arizona | Receiving | | |
| Cal Poly | Passing | | |
| Cal Poly | Rushing | | |
| Cal Poly | Receiving | | |

=== vs Sacramento State ===
Sacramento State Hornets vs Cal Poly Mustangs – Game summary

| Quarter | 1 | 2 | Total |
|---|---|---|---|
| Hornets | | | 0 |
| Mustangs | | | 0 |

at Mustang Memorial Field • San Luis Obispo, California

- Date: November 16
- Game time: 5:00
- TV announcers (ESPN+): Chris Sylvester, John Kane

| Statistics | SAC | CP |
|---|---|---|
| First downs | | |
| Plays–yards | | |
| Rushes–yards | | |
| Passing yards | | |
| Passing: comp–att–int | | |
| Turnovers | | |
| Time of possession | | |

| Team | Category | Player | Statistics |
|---|---|---|---|
| Sacramento State | Passing | | |
| Sacramento State | Rushing | | |
| Sacramento State | Receiving | | |
| Cal Poly | Passing | | |
| Cal Poly | Rushing | | |
| Cal Poly | Receiving | | |

=== at Weber State ===
Cal Poly Mustangs at Weber State Wildcats – Game summary

| Quarter | 1 | 2 | Total |
|---|---|---|---|
| Mustangs | | | 0 |
| Wildcats | | | 0 |

at Stewart Stadium • Ogden, Utah

- Date: November 23
- Game time: 3:00
- TV announcers (ESPN+): Tony Parks, Riley Jensen

| Statistics | CP | WEB |
|---|---|---|
| First downs | | |
| Plays–yards | | |
| Rushes–yards | | |
| Passing yards | | |
| Passing: comp–att–int | | |
| Turnovers | | |
| Time of possession | | |

| Team | Category | Player | Statistics |
|---|---|---|---|
| Cal Poly | Passing | | |
| Cal Poly | Rushing | | |
| Cal Poly | Receiving | | |
| Weber State | Passing | | |
| Weber State | Rushing | | |
| Weber State | Receiving | | |

== Roster ==
2024 Cal Poly Mustangs football team roster
Players
Coaches
Offense

| Pos. | # | Name | Class |
|---|---|---|---|
| WR | 0 | Logan Booher | Jr |
| WR | 1 | Aaron Okoro | GS |
| WR | 2 | Giancarlo Woods | Sr |
| QB | 3 | Bo Kelly | So |
| RB | 4 | Jaedon Matthews | Fr |
| RB | 5 | Aiden Ramos | Fr |
| WR | 6 | Tyrece Fairly-Diyem | So |
| TE | 7 | Jake Woods | Jr |
| RB | 8 | Shakobe Harper | Sr |
| WR | 9 | Evan Burkhart | Sr |
| WR | 10 | Michael Briscoe | Jr |
| QB | 11 | Jaden Jones | Jr |
| QB | 12 | Jackson Akins | So |
| WR | 13 | Reed Shumpert | Jr |
| WR | 14 | Aiden Hall | Fr |
| TE | 15 | Robbie Greer | Sr |
| QB | 16 | Lucas Razore | Fr |
| QB | 17 | Richie Watts | So |
| WR | 18 | Josiah Lamarque | Fr |
| RB | 19 | Zion Hall | Jr |
| RB | 20 | Trey Wilson | Fr |
| RB | 21 | Troy Fletcher | So |
| RB | 22 | Paul Holyfield Jr. | So |
| WR | 23 | Kian Salehi | Fr |
| TE | 24 | Michael Otterstedt | Jr |
| RB | 26 | Malachi Brown | Fr |
| WR | 28 | Joey Villaroman | Fr |
| WR | 32 | Nolan Cummings | Fr |
| RB | 33 | Devin Cerda | Fr |
| RB | 34 | Kendric Sanders | Fr |
| TE | 39 | Caden Rose | Fr |
| TE | 42 | Ava Leota | Jr |
| OL | 52 | Payson Campisano | Sr |
| OL | 54 | Hayden Jones | So |
| OL | 55 | Tristan Fui | Fr |
| OL | 59 | Tyler Charbonneau | Jr |
| OL | 61 | Ethan Bronson | Sr |
| OL | 62 | Hunter Jones | GS |
| OL | 65 | Kavika Fitisemanu | So |
| OL | 66 | Kamani Fifita | Fr |
| OL | 69 | Enzo Hall | Fr |
| OL | 71 | Charles Lincoln | GS |
| OL | 72 | Austin Anderson | Sr |
| OL | 73 | Brady Norton | Fr |
| OL | 74 | Jasdev Banwait | So |
| OL | 75 | Tanner Hirschler | So |
| OL | 76 | Trevor Newkirk | Fr |
| OL | 77 | Jayden Smith | Fr |
| OL | 78 | Racin Delgatty | Fr |
| OL | 79 | Miles Medina | Fr |
| TE | 80 | Ty Bourland | So |
| WR | 81 | Cal Zimmerman | Fr |
| WR | 82 | Jordan Garrison | Fr |
| WR | 83 | Bain Eiseman | Fr |
| TE | 84 | Alek Marshall | Fr |
| TE | 85 | Aaron Meyer | Fr |
| WR | 87 | Brooks Wheatley | Fr |
| WR | 88 | Makhi Johnson | So |

Defense

| Pos. | # | Name | Class |
|---|---|---|---|
| S | 0 | Chris Snyder | Fr |
| CB | 1 | Delano Franklin | So |
| LB | 2 | Troy Bean | Fr |
| LB | 3 | Ethan Calvert | Jr |
| CB | 4 | Kai Rapolla | So |
| LB | 5 | Je'kob Jones | Jr |
| CB | 6 | Xavier Oliphant | Sr |
| S | 7 | Jake East | So |
| S | 8 | DeMel Turner | So |
| S | 9 | Brian Dukes Jr. | Jr |
| LB | 10 | Mikey D'Amato | So |
| S | 11 | Jamauri Jackson | Jr |
| DL | 12 | Victory Johnson | Fr |
| CB | 13 | Kresean Kizzy | Fr |
| DL | 14 | Elijah Ponder | Sr |
| CB | 15 | Budha Boyd | Fr |
| S | 16 | Tyler Williams | Jr |
| CB | 17 | Guy Kirson | Sr |
| LB | 20 | Kenny Olson | So |
| LB | 22 | Misa Paiau | Fr |
| S | 23 | Jeremiah Bernard | Fr |
| S | 25 | Jeremy Justice | Sr |
| CB | 26 | Tayden Phillips | Fr |
| CB | 27 | Calvin Moore | Fr |
| LB | 28 | Charlie Sullivan | Fr |
| CB | 29 | Justus Woods | Fr |
| CB | 30 | Boston Wilson | So |
| S | 32 | Mason Rivera | So |
| LB | 36 | Gage Burnett | Fr |
| LB | 37 | Noah Sulick | Fr |
| DL | 40 | Matthew Nuanez | Jr |
| LB | 42 | Jake Javorsky | Fr |
| LB | 43 | Judaea Moon | GS |
| LB | 44 | Carson Jones | So |
| CB | 47 | Brayden Breedlove | Fr |
| LB | 48 | Logan Foster | Sr |
| DL | 49 | Julius Jordan | So |
| DL | 50 | Jacob Bobic | Fr |
| DL | 51 | Will Plemons | Fr |
| DL | 53 | Nilasoni Finau | Jr |
| DL | 58 | Thomas Bouda | Jr |
| DL | 60 | Ethan Rodriguez | Sr |
| DL | 88 | Jordan Sanders | So |
| DL | 89 | Tyler Hoffman | So |
| DT | 90 | Marquise Jones | Fr |
| DL | 92 | Jake Vorhees | Fr |
| DL | 94 | Ish Taliauli | Fr |
| DL | 95 | Antonio Vakameilalo | Sr |
| DL | 96 | Mason Barbour | Jr |
| DL | 98 | J. T. Houston | Fr |
| DL | 99 | Josh Ngaluafe | Jr |

Special teams

| Pos. | # | Name | Class |
|---|---|---|---|
| LS | 33 | Spencer Moore | Jr |
| P | 35 | Jesse Ehrlich | So |
| K | 38 | Noah Serna | So |
| LS | 41 | Nehemiah Cha | Fr |
| P | 46 | Ryan Collins | Jr |
| K | 63 | Josue Lopez | Fr |
| K | 67 | Jaden Ohlsen | Jr |
| K | 68 | Gianluca Dimauro | So |

Head coach

- Paul Wulff

Coordinators/assistant coaches

- Will Plemons (Assistant head coach / Defensive line)
- Timm Rosenbach (Co-Offensive coordinator / Wide receivers)
- Erik Meyer (Co-Offensive coordinator / Quarterbacks)
- Cody vonAppen (Defensive coordinator / Safeties)
- Ryan Payne (Run Game coordinator / Offensive line)
- Asa Jackson (Cornerbacks)
- Joey Muscarella (Tight ends / Kickers & punters)
- Josh Letuligasenoa (Outside linebackers)
- Steve Broussard (Running backs)
- Everrette Thompson (Co-Special Teams coordinator / assistant linebackers)
- Matthew Hazelwood (Co-Special Teams coordinator / assistant safeties)
- Kevin Clune (Inside linebackers)
- Taylor Fendall (Offensive quality control / assistant offensive)

Legend

- (C) Team captain
- (S) Suspended
- (I) Ineligible
- Injured
- Redshirt

Roster
Last update: November 29, 2024
