= 2024 Idaho State Bengals football team =

American college football season

2024 Idaho State Bengals football
- Conference: Big Sky Conference
- Record: 5–7 (3–5 Big Sky)
- Head coach: Cody Hawkins (2nd season)
- Co-offensive coordinator: Buddy Blevins (1st season)
- Offensive scheme: Run and shoot
- Defensive coordinator: Josh Runda (2nd season)
- Base defense: 3–3–5
- Home stadium: ICCU Dome

2024 Big Sky Conference football standings
	Conf.			Overall
Team	W		L	W		L
No. 2 Montana State $^	8	–	0	15	–	1
No. 5 UC Davis ^	7	–	1	11	–	3
No. 7 Idaho ^	6	–	2	10	–	4
No. 22 Northern Arizona ^	6	–	2	8	–	5
No. 10 Montana ^	5	–	3	9	–	5
Idaho State	3	–	5	5	–	7
Eastern Washington	3	–	5	4	–	8
Weber State	3	–	5	4	–	8
Portland State	3	–	5	3	–	8
Cal Poly	2	–	6	3	–	8
Sacramento State	1	–	7	3	–	9
Northern Colorado	1	–	7	1	–	11
$ – Conference champion; ^ – FCS playoff participant; Rankings from STATS Poll

The 2024 Idaho State Bengals football team represented Idaho State University in the Big Sky Conference during the 2024 NCAA Division I FCS football season. Led by second-year head coach Cody Hawkins, the Bengals played their home games on campus at the ICCU Dome, an indoor facility in Pocatello, Idaho.

== Preseason ==
=== Polls ===
On July 21, 2024, during the virtual Big Sky Kickoff, the Bengals were predicted to finish 8th in the Big Sky by the coaches, and 10th by the media.

=== Preseason All–Big Sky team ===
The Bengals had one player selected to the Preseason All–Big Sky team.

Defense

Calvin Pitcher – DB

== Schedule ==
Date	Time	Opponent	Site	TV	Result	Attendance
August 31	4:30 p.m.	at Oregon State*	Reser Stadium; Corvallis, OR	The CW	L 15–38	31,013
September 7	4:00 p.m.	Western Oregon*	ICCU Dome; Pocatello, ID	ESPN+	W 50–10	6,252
September 14	12:00 p.m.	at No. 10 North Dakota*	Alerus Center; Grand Forks, ND	MidCo+	L 28–52	10,685
September 21	4:00 p.m.	Southern Utah*^{†}	ICCU Dome; Pocatello, ID	ESPN+	W 38–28	8,688
September 28	4:00 p.m.	No. 3 Montana State	ICCU Dome; Pocatello, ID	ESPN+	L 17–37	N/A
October 5	6:00 p.m.	at Cal Poly	Mustang Memorial Field; San Luis Obispo, CA	ESPN+	W 41–38	8,429
October 12	4:00 p.m.	Portland State	ICCU Dome; Pocatello, ID	ESPN+	L 38–42	5,618
October 19	2:00 p.m.	at Northern Arizona	Walkup Skydome; Flagstaff, AZ	ESPN+	L 26–30	8,212
October 26	4:00 p.m.	Sacramento State	ICCU Dome; Pocatello, ID	ESPN+	W 30–27 ^{OT}	5,804
November 9	1:00 p.m.	at Weber State	Stewart Stadium; Ogden, UT	ESPN+	W 43–35	7,223
November 16	2:00 p.m.	at Eastern Washington	Roos Field; Cheney, WA	ESPN+	L 42–77	4,854
November 23	4:00 p.m.	No. 7 Idaho	ICCU Dome; Pocatello, ID (rivalry)	ESPN+	L 17–40	10,032
*Non-conference game; ^{†}Homecoming; Rankings from STATS Poll released prior to the game; All times are in Mountain time; Source:

== Game summaries ==
=== at Oregon State (FBS) ===
Idaho State Bengals (0–0) at Oregon State Beavers (FBS) (0–0) – Game summary

Quarter	1	2	3	4	Total
Bengals	9	0	6	0	15
Beavers (FBS)	7	10	14	7	38

at Reser Stadium • Corvallis, Oregon

- Date: August 31
- Game time: 4:30 p.m.
- Game weather: Sunny • Temperature: 92 °F (33 °C) • Wind: W at 5 miles per hour (8.0 km/h)
- Game attendance: 31,013
- Referee: John Love
- TV announcers (The CW): Thom Brennaman (play-by-play), Max Browne (analyst), and Michael Bumpus (sideline reporter)
- Box score, Recap

Game information
First quarter
- (5:55) ORST – Anthony Hankerson 15-yard run, Everett Hayes kick (Drive: 6 plays, 63 yards, 2:42; Oregon State 7–0)
- (1:09) IDST – Team safety (Oregon State 7–2)
- (0:00) IDST – Christian Fredericksen 35-yard pass from Kobe Tracy, Gabe Panikowski kick (Drive: 3 plays, 59 yards, 1:03; Idaho State 9–7)

Second quarter

- (9:34) ORST – Everett Hayes 32-yard field goal (Drive: 12 plays, 51 yards, 5:26; Oregon State 10–9)
- (0:27) ORST – Anthony Hankerson 6-yard run, Everett Hayes kick (Drive: 11 plays, 71 yards, 4:14; Oregon State 17–9)

Third quarter

- (10:39) ORST – David Wells Jr. 55-yard pass from Gevani McCoy, Everett Hayes kick (Drive: 1 play, 55 yards, 0:09; Oregon State 24–9)
- (3:17) ORST – Jam Griffin 22-yard run, Everett Hayes kick (Drive: 8 plays, 80 yards, 4:01; Oregon State 31–9)
- (1:04) IDST – Michael Shulikov 9-yard pass from Hunter Hays, kick failed (Drive: 7 plays, 87 yards, 2:08; Oregon State 31–15)

Fourth quarter

- (9:31) ORST – Jam Griffin 20-yard run, Everett Hayes kick (Drive: 11 plays, 75 yards, 6:33; Oregon State 38–15)

Statistics	IDST	ORST
First downs	22	29
Plays–yards	61–311	72–510
Rushes–yards	16–82	58–362
Passing yards	229	148
Passing: comp–att–int	23–45–2	11–14–0
Time of possession	22:31	37:29

Team	Category	Player	Statistics
Idaho State	Passing	Kobe Tracy	9/14, 114 yards, 1 TD
Idaho State	Rushing	Keoua Kauhi	4 carries, 39 yards
Idaho State	Receiving	Christian Fredericksen	5 receptions, 68 yards, 1 TD
Oregon State	Passing	Gevani McCoy	9/10, 114 yards, 1 TD
Oregon State	Rushing	Jam Griffin	20 carries, 160 yards, 2 TD
Oregon State	Receiving	David Wells Jr.	2 receptions, 63 yards, 1 TD

=== vs Western Oregon (DII) ===
Western Oregon Wolves (DII) (0–0) vs Idaho State Bengals (0–1) – Game summary

Quarter	1	2	3	4	Total
Wolves (DII)	0	3	0	7	10
Bengals	17	17	7	9	50

at ICCU Dome • Pocatello, Idaho

- Date: September 7
- Game time: 4:00 p.m.
- Game weather: None (indoor stadium)
- Game attendance: 6,252
- Referee: Michael Bezner
- TV announcers (ESPN+): Scott Gross (play-by-play), Kody Graves (analyst), and Mitch Beckstead (sideline reporter)
- Box score, Recap

Game information

First quarter

- (8:29) IDST – Ian Duarte 41-yard pass from Kobe Tracy, Gabe Panikowski kick (Drive: 3 plays, 62 yards, 1:19; Idaho State 7–0)
- (4:10) IDST – Gabe Panikowski 36-yard field goal (Drive: 6 plays, 40 yards, 2:27; Idaho State 10–0)
- (1:00) IDST – Ian Duarte 5-yard pass from Kobe Tracy, Gabe Panikowski kick (Drive: 4 plays, 66 yards, 1:52; Idaho State 17–0)

Second quarter

- (11:21) IDST – Eric Johnson 5-yard pass from Kobe Tracy, Gabe Panikowski kick (Drive: 7 plays, 65 yards, 3:25; Idaho State 24–0)
- (6:46) IDST – Gabe Panikowski 51-yard field goal (Drive: 7 plays, 30 yards, 3:19; Idaho State 27–0)
- (0:55) IDST – Junior Damuni 0-yard punt return, Gabe Panikowski kick (Idaho State 34–0)
- (0:08) WOR – Keaton Emmett 34-yard field goal (Drive: 6 plays, 66 yards, 0:42; Idaho State 34–3)

Third quarter

- (4:18) IDST – Janari Boone 28-yard fumble return, Gabe Panikowski kick (Idaho State 41–3)

Fourth quarter

- (11:26) IDST – Aaron Blancas 12-yard pass from Kobe Tracy, kick failed (Drive: 12 plays, 84 yards, 4:32; Idaho State 47–3)
- (8:27) IDST – Gabe Panikowski 37-yard field goal (Drive: 5 plays, 39 yards, 1:23; Idaho State 50–3)
- (4:23) WOR – Fresh Ison 19-yard run, Keaton Emmett kick (Drive: 8 plays, 75 yards, 4:04; Idaho State 50–10)

Statistics	WOR	IDST
First downs	12	28
Plays–yards	59–221	79–556
Rushes–yards	36–114	28–126
Passing yards	107	430
Passing: comp–att–int	9–23–0	33–51–2
Time of possession	26:12	33:48

Team	Category	Player	Statistics
Western Oregon	Passing	Kainoa Jones	6/12, 63 yards
Western Oregon	Rushing	Jordan McCarty	7 carries, 36 yards
Western Oregon	Receiving	Damon Hickok	2 receptions, 48 yards
Idaho State	Passing	Kobe Tracy	28/42, 343 yards, 4 TD, 2 INT
Idaho State	Rushing	Donald Austin	4 carries, 29 yards
Idaho State	Receiving	Ian Duarte	9 receptions, 123 yards, 2 TD

=== at No. 10 North Dakota ===
Idaho State Bengals (1–1) at No. 10 North Dakota Fighting Hawks (1–1) – Game summary

Quarter	1	2	3	4	Total
Bengals	0	7	7	14	28
No. 10 Fighting Hawks	14	24	7	7	52

at Alerus Center • Grand Forks, North Dakota

- Date: September 14
- Game time: 12:00 p.m.
- Game weather: None (indoor stadium)
- Game attendance: 10,685
- Referee: Tyler Downs
- TV announcers (MidCo+): Alex Heinert (play-by-play) and Ryan Kasowski (analyst)
- Box score, Recap

Game information

First quarter

- (4:14) UND – Gaven Ziebarth 1-yard run, CJ Elrichs kick (Drive: 16 plays, 80 yards, 6:39; North Dakota 7–0)
- (1:10) UND – Devin Hembry 92-yard interception return, CJ Elrichs kick (North Dakota 14–0)

Second quarter

- (10:58) UND – Isaiah Smith 1-yard run, CJ Elrichs kick (Drive: 11 plays, 65 yards, 4:48; North Dakota 21–0)
- (9:51) UND – CJ Elrichs 31-yard field goal (Drive: 4 plays, 1 yard, 1:01; North Dakota 24–0)
- (4:58) UND – Sawyer Seidl 1-yard run, CJ Elrichs kick (Drive: 5 plays, 68 yards, 2:06; North Dakota 31–0)
- (3:50) UND – Gaven Ziebarth 4-yard pass from Simon Romfo, CJ Elrichs kick (Drive: 1 play, 4 yards, 0:06; North Dakota 38–0)
- (0:17) IDST – Jeff Weimer 7-yard pass from Hunter Hays, Gabe Panikowski kick (Drive: 12 plays, 75 yards, 3:33; North Dakota 38–7)

Third quarter

- (4:04) IDST – Ian Duarte 11-yard pass from Hunter Hays, Gabe Panikowski kick (Drive: 6 plays, 61 yards, 2:51; North Dakota 38–14)
- (1:01) UND – Bo Belquist 17-yard pass from Simon Romfo, CJ Elrichs kick (Drive: 5 plays, 72 yards, 2:58; North Dakota 45–14)

Fourth quarter

- (14:27) IDST – Michael Shulikov 6-yard pass from Hunter Hays, Gabe Panikowski kick (Drive: 4 plays, 39 yards, 1:25; North Dakota 45–21)
- (3:30) UND – Donavan Hunt 23-yard run, CJ Elrichs kick (Drive: 7 plays, 79 yards, 3:24; North Dakota 52–21)
- (0:59) IDST – Jeff Weimer 30-yard pass from Hunter Hays, Gabe Panikowski kick (Drive: 10 plays, 85 yards, 2:28; North Dakota 52–28)

Statistics	IDST	UND
First downs	22	25
Plays–yards	71–385	76–442
Rushes–yards	28–92	38–155
Passing yards	293	287
Passing: comp–att–int	25–43–1	25–38–1
Time of possession	23:23	36:37

Team	Category	Player	Statistics
Idaho State	Passing	Hunter Hays	18/23, 206 yards, 4 TD
Idaho State	Rushing	Hunter Hays	14 carries, 66 yards
Idaho State	Receiving	Jeff Weimer	6 receptions, 92 yards, 2 TD
North Dakota	Passing	Simon Romfo	25/38, 287 yards, 2 TD, 1 INT
North Dakota	Rushing	Sawyer Seidl	10 carries, 50 yards, 1 TD
North Dakota	Receiving	Bo Belquist	8 receptions, 165 yards, 1 TD

=== vs Southern Utah ===
Southern Utah Thunderbirds (1–2) vs Idaho State Bengals (1–2) – Game summary

Quarter	1	2	3	4	Total
Thunderbirds	0	7	7	14	28
Bengals	14	10	7	7	38

at ICCU Dome • Pocatello, Idaho

- Date: September 21
- Game time: 4:00 p.m.
- Game weather: None (indoor stadium)
- Game attendance: 8,688
- Referee: Jeff Rink
- TV announcers (ESPN+): Scott Gross (play-by-play), Kody Graves (analyst), and Mitch Beckstead (sideline reporter)
- Box score, Recap

Game information

First quarter

- (9:08) IDST – Hunter Hays 4-yard run, Gabe Panikowski kick (Drive: 9 plays, 65 yards, 4:22; Idaho State 7–0)
- (1:20) IDST – Hunter Hays 7-yard run, Gabe Panikowski kick (Drive: 7 plays, 67 yards, 4:33; Idaho State 14–0)

Second quarter

- (14:54) SUU – Gabe Nunez 19-yard pass from Jackson Berry, Jayden Rogers kick (Drive: 5 plays, 54 yards, 0:06; Idaho State 14–7)
- (4:57) IDST – Gabe Panikowski 39-yard field goal (Drive: 10 plays, 37 yards, 5:32; Idaho State 17–7)
- (0:10) IDST – Eric Johnson 18-yard pass from Kobe Tracy, Gabe Panikowski kick (Drive: 10 plays, 82 yards, 3:00; Idaho State 24–7)

Third quarter

- (0:40) SUU – Jackson Berry 2-yard run, Jayden Rogers kick (Drive: 13 plays, 100 yards, 6:31; Idaho State 24–14)
- (0:25) IDST – Dason Brooks 75-yard run, Gabe Panikowski kick (Drive: 1 play, 75 yards, 0:15; Idaho State 31–14)

Fourth quarter

- (12:24) SUU – Targhee Lambson 1-yard run, Jayden Rogers kick (Drive: 7 plays, 75 yards, 3:01; Idaho State 31–21)
- (1:46) IDST – Christian Fredericksen 20-yard pass from Hunter Hays, Gabe Panikowski kick (Drive: 2 plays, 38 yards, 0:19; Idaho State 38–21)
- (0:06) SUU – Shane Carr 2-yard pass from Bronson Barron, Jayden Rogers kick (Drive: 9 plays, 75 yards, 1:40; Idaho State 38–28)

Statistics	SUU	IDST
First downs	25	22
Plays–yards	79–485	61–408
Rushes–yards	43–218	33–247
Passing yards	267	161
Passing: comp–att–int	21–36–0	18–28–1
Time of possession	30:18	28:25

Team	Category	Player	Statistics
Southern Utah	Passing	Jackson Berry	13/20, 177 yards, 1 TD
Southern Utah	Rushing	Targhee Lambson	26 carries, 172 yards, 1 TD
Southern Utah	Receiving	Shane Carr	7 receptions, 104 yards, 1 TD
Idaho State	Passing	Kobe Tracy	15/23, 131 yards, 1 TD
Idaho State	Rushing	Dason Brooks	8 carries, 136 yards, 1 TD
Idaho State	Receiving	Jeff Weimer	4 receptions, 53 yards

=== vs No. 3 Montana State ===
No. 3 Montana State Bobcats (4–0) vs Idaho State Bengals (2–2) – Game summary

Quarter	1	2	3	4	Total
No. 3 Bobcats	3	14	0	20	37
Bengals	0	7	0	10	17

at ICCU Dome • Pocatello, Idaho

- Date: September 28
- Game time: 4:00 p.m.
- Game weather: None (indoor stadium)
- Game attendance: N/A
- Referee: Scott Root
- TV announcers (ESPN+): Ben Creighton (play-by-play), Ty Gregorak (analyst) and Grace Lawrence (sideline reporter)
- Box score, Recap

Game information

First quarter

- (4:55) MTST – Myles Sansted 44-yard field goal (Drive: 7 plays, 16 yards, 2:52; Montana State 3–0)

Second quarter

- (14:56) MTST – Tommy Mellott 7-yard run, Myles Sansted kick (Drive: 9 plays, 74 yards, 0:04; Montana State 10–0)
- (4:33) MTST – Scottre Humphrey 18-yard run, Myles Sansted kick (Drive: 4 plays, 49 yards, 1:56; Montana State 17–0)
- (0:06) IDST – Michael Shulikov 5-yard pass from Kobe Tracy, Gabe Panikowski kick (Drive: 14 plays, 75 yards, 4:27; Montana State 17–7)

Third quarter

- No scoring plays

Fourth quarter

- (14:56) IDST – Gabe Panikowski 33-yard field goal (Drive: 12 plays, 77 yards, 5:05; Montana State 17–10)
- (14:47) MTST – Rohan Jones 70-yard pass from Tommy Mellott, Myles Sansted kick (Drive: 1 play, 70 yards, 0:09; Montana State 24–10)
- (8:58) MTST – Scottre Humphrey 6-yard run, Myles Sansted kick (Drive: 8 plays, 74 yards, 4:08; Montana State 31–10)
- (4:58) IDST – Jeff Weimer 16-yard pass from Kobe Tracy, Gabe Panikowski kick (Drive: 10 plays, 75 yards, 4:00; Montana State 31–17)
- (0:00) MTST – Scottre Humphrey 8-yard run (Drive: 9 plays, 44 yards, 4:57; Montana State 37–17)

Statistics	MTST	IDST
First downs	21	16
Plays–yards	66–410	61–276
Rushes–yards	49–268	20–75
Passing yards	142	201
Passing: comp–att–int	10–17–0	20–41–1
Time of possession	31:42	23:44

Team	Category	Player	Statistics
Montana State	Passing	Tommy Mellott	10/17, 142 yards, TD
Montana State	Rushing	Scottre Humphrey	27 carries, 159 yards, 3 TD
Montana State	Receiving	Rohan Jones	2 receptions, 93 yards, 1D
Idaho State	Passing	Kobe Tracy	17/33, 183 yards, 2 TD
Idaho State	Rushing	Dason Brooks	5 carries, 25 yards
Idaho State	Receiving	Christian Fredericksen	6 receptions, 60 yards

=== at Cal Poly ===
Idaho State Bengals (2–3) at Cal Poly Mustangs (2–2) – Game summary

Quarter	1	2	3	4	Total
Bengals	17	7	7	10	41
Mustangs	7	14	7	10	38

at Mustang Memorial Field • San Luis Obispo, California

- Date: October 5
- Game time: 6:00 p.m.
- Game weather: Sunny • Temperature: 76 °F (24 °C) • Wind: NW at 10 miles per hour (16 km/h)
- Game attendance: 8,429
- Referee: Kelly Holman
- TV announcers (ESPN+): Chris Sylvester (play-by-play) and John Kane (analyst)
- Box score, Recap

Game information

First quarter

- (11:59) CP – Michael Briscoe 19-yard pass from Jaden Jones, Noah Serna kick (Drive: 6 plays, 84 yards, 2:56; Cal Poly 7–0)
- (8:08) IDST – Gabe Panikowski 33-yard field goal (Drive: 10 plays, 59 yards, 3:47; Cal Poly 7–3)
- (3:23) IDST – Christian Fredericksen 9-yard pass from Kobe Tracy, Gabe Panikowski kick (Drive: 7 plays, 45 yards, 2:37; Idaho State 10–7)
- (0:12) IDST – Jeff Weimer 84-yard pass from Kobe Tracy, Gabe Panikowski kick (Drive: 2 plays, 95 yards, 0:46; Idaho State 17–7)

Second quarter

- (7:29) CP – Michael Briscoe 19-yard run, Noah Serna kick (Drive: 8 plays, 88 yards, 4:01; Idaho State 17–14)
- (4:35) CP – Jake East 26-yard interception return, Noah Serna kick (Cal Poly 21–17)
- (0:44) IDST – Hunter Hays 5-yard run, Gabe Panikowski kick (Drive: 2 plays, 18 yards, 0:09; Idaho State 24–21)

Third quarter

- (7:56) CP – Richie Watts 10-yard run, Noah Serna kick (Drive: 10 plays, 67 yards, 5:08; Cal Poly 28–24)
- (3:14) IDST – Christian Fredericksen 21-yard pass from Kobe Tracy, Gabe Panikowski kick (Drive: 10 plays, 75 yards, 4:42; Idaho State 31–28)

Fourth quarter

- (13:33) CP – Richie Watts 11-yard run, Noah Serna kick (Drive: 9 plays, 71 yards, 4:35; Cal Poly 35–31)
- (11:16) IDST – Dason Brooks 3-yard run, Gabe Panikowski kick (Drive: 5 plays, 75 yards, 2:17; Idaho State 38–35)
- (6:16) CP – Noah Serna 26-yard field goal (Drive: 10 plays, 57 yards, 5:00; Tied 38–38)
- (0:00) IDST – Gabe Panikowski 24-yard field goal (Drive: 9 plays, 69 yards, 3:11; Idaho State 41–38)

Statistics	IDST	CP
First downs	27	22
Plays–yards	68–531	63–408
Rushes–yards	24–106	48–295
Passing yards	425	113
Passing: comp–att–int	30–44–1	12–15–1
Time of possession	27:32	32:28

Team	Category	Player	Statistics
Idaho State	Passing	Kobe Tracy	30/44, 425 yards, 3 TD, 1 INT
Idaho State	Rushing	Dason Brooks	11 carries, 48 yards, 1 TD
Idaho State	Receiving	Jeff Weimer	12 receptions, 236 yards, 1 TD
Cal Poly	Passing	Bo Kelly	6/6, 65 yards
Cal Poly	Rushing	Richie Watts	18 carries, 115 yards, 2 TD
Cal Poly	Receiving	Evan Burkhart	2 receptions, 29 yards

=== vs Portland State ===
Portland State Vikings (0–5) at Idaho State Bengals (3–3) – Game summary

Quarter	1	2	3	4	Total
Vikings	7	14	14	7	42
Bengals	10	21	0	7	38

at ICCU Dome • Pocatello, Idaho

- Date: October 12
- Game time: 4:00 p.m.
- Game weather: None (indoor stadium)
- Game attendance: 5,618
- Referee: Jhon Doe
- TV announcers (ESPN+): Scott Gross (play-by-play), Kody Graves (analyst), and Mitch Beckstead (sideline reporter)
- Box score, Recap

Game information

First quarter

- (10:21) IDST – Gabe Panikowski 48-yard field goal (Drive: 11 plays, 51 yards, 4:34; Idaho State 3–0)
- (8:09) PRST – Dante Chachere 62-yard run, Mathias Uribe kick (Drive: 6 plays, 75 yards, 2:12; Portland State 7–3)
- (2:27) IDST – Hunter Hays 6-yard run, Gabe Panikowski kick (Drive: 11 plays, 75 yards, 5:42; Idaho State 10–7)

Second quarter

- (11:34) IDST – Dason Brooks 15-yard run, Gabe Panikowski kick (Drive: 8 plays, 88 yards, 3:26; Idaho State 17–7)
- (8:23) PRST – Dante Chachere 8-yard run, Mathias Uribe kick (Drive: 6 plays, 75 yards, 3:11; Idaho State 17–14)
- (2:42) IDST – Hunter Hays 7-yard run, Gabe Panikowski kick (Drive: 11 plays, 50 yards, 5:38; Idaho State 24–14)
- (1:48) PRST – Eric Denham 31-yard pass from Dante Chachere, Mathias Uribe kick (Drive: 3 plays, 49 yards, 0:46; Idaho State 24–21)
- (0:31) IDST – Hunter Hays 5-yard run, Gabe Panikowski kick (Drive: 7 plays, 75 yards, 1:17; Idaho State 31–21)

Third quarter

- (14:49) PRST – Branden Alvarez 50-yard pass from Dante Chachere, Mathias Uribe kick (Drive: 2 plays, 50 yards, 0:11; Idaho State 31–28)
- (10:34) PRST – Dante Chachere 53-yard run, Mathias Uribe kick (Drive: 6 plays, 73 yards, 2:47; Portland State 35–31)

Fourth quarter

- (13:52) IDST – Justice Jackson 10-yard run, Gabe Panikowski kick (Drive: 6 plays, 83 yards, 2:01; Idaho State 38–35)
- (11:34) PRST – Eric Denham 21-yard pass from Dante Chachere, Mathias Uribe kick (Drive: 6 plays, 75 yards, 2:18; Portland State 42–38)

Statistics	PRST	IDST
First downs	21	34
Plays–yards	65–516	87–503
Rushes–yards	39–300	37–217
Passing yards	216	286
Passing: comp–att–int	12–26–0	27–50–0
Time of possession	27:07	32:45

Team	Category	Player	Statistics
Portland State	Passing	Dante Chachere	12/26, 216 yards, 3 TD
Portland State	Rushing	Dante Chachere	13 carries, 202 yards, 3 TD
Portland State	Receiving	Eric Denham	5 receptions, 127 yards, 2 TD
Idaho State	Passing	Kobe Tracy	25/48, 275 yards
Idaho State	Rushing	Dason Brooks	16 carries, 90 yards, 1 TD
Idaho State	Receiving	Christian Fredericksen	9 receptions, 101 yards

=== at Northern Arizona ===
Idaho State Bengals (3–4) at Northern Arizona Lumberjacks (3–4) – Game summary

Quarter	1	2	3	4	Total
Bengals	0	6	17	3	26
Lumberjacks	3	7	6	14	30

at Walkup Skydome • Flagstaff, Arizona

- Date: October 19
- Game time: 2:00 p.m.
- Game weather: None (indoor stadium)
- Game attendance: 8,212
- Referee: Gregg Wilson
- TV announcers (ESPN+): Mitch Strohman (play-by-play), Kevin Stephens (analyst), and Ava Nichols (sideline reporter)
- Box score, Recap

Game information

First quarter
Second quarter
Third quarter
Fourth quarter

Statistics	IDST	NAU
First downs		
Plays–yards		
Rushes–yards		
Passing yards		
Passing: comp–att–int		
Time of possession		

Team	Category	Player	Statistics
Idaho State	Passing		
Idaho State	Rushing		
Idaho State	Receiving		
Northern Arizona	Passing		
Northern Arizona	Rushing		
Northern Arizona	Receiving		

=== vs Sacramento State ===
Sacramento State Hornets (3–4) vs Idaho State Bengals (3–5) – Game summary

Quarter	1	2	3	4	OT	Total
Hornets	7	14	0	3	3	27
Bengals	0	21	3	0	6	30

at ICCU Dome • Pocatello, Idaho

- Date: October 26
- Game time: 4:00 p.m.
- Game weather: None (indoor stadium)
- Game attendance: 5,804
- Referee: Scott Root
- TV announcers (ESPN+): Scott Gross (play-by-play), Kody Graves (analyst), and Mitch Beckstead (sideline reporter)
- Box score, Recap

Game information

First quarter
Second quarter
Third quarter
Fourth quarter

Statistics	SAC	IDST
First downs		
Plays–yards		
Rushes–yards		
Passing yards		
Passing: comp–att–int		
Time of possession		

Team	Category	Player	Statistics
Sacramento State	Passing		
Sacramento State	Rushing		
Sacramento State	Receiving		
Idaho State	Passing		
Idaho State	Rushing		
Idaho State	Receiving		

=== at Weber State ===
Idaho State Bengals (4–5) at Weber State Wildcats (3–6) – Game summary

Quarter	1	2	3	4	Total
Bengals	6	16	7	14	43
Wildcats	0	14	7	14	35

at Stewart Stadium • Ogden, Utah

- Date: November 9
- Game time: 1:00 p.m.
- Game weather: Sunny • Temperature: 50 °F (10 °C) • Wind: SW at 5 miles per hour (8.0 km/h)
- Game attendance: 7,223
- Referee: Robert Quello
- TV announcers (ESPN+): Tony Parks (play-by-play) and Riley Jensen (analyst)
- Box score, Recap

Game information

First quarter
Second quarter
Third quarter
Fourth quarter

Statistics	IDST	WEB
First downs		
Plays–yards		
Rushes–yards		
Passing yards		
Passing: comp–att–int		
Time of possession		

Team	Category	Player	Statistics
Idaho State	Passing		
Idaho State	Rushing		
Idaho State	Receiving		
Weber State	Passing		
Weber State	Rushing		
Weber State	Receiving		

=== at Eastern Washington ===
Idaho State Bengals (5–5) at Eastern Washington Eagles (3–7) – Game summary

Quarter	1	2	3	4	Total
Bengals	14	14	7	7	42
Eagles	21	28	7	21	77

at Roos Field • Cheney, Washington

- Date: November 16
- Game time: 2:00 p.m.
- Game weather: Cloudy • Temperature: 38 °F (3 °C) • Wind: SW at 11 miles per hour (18 km/h)
- Game attendance: 4,854
- Referee: Jim Crowley
- TV announcers (ESPN+): Bob Castle (play-by-play) and Bill Ames (analyst)

Game information

First quarter
Second quarter
Third quarter
Fourth quarter

Statistics	IDST	EWU
First downs	30	37
Plays–yards	79–484	67–704
Rushes–yards	25–114	52–478
Passing yards	370	226
Passing: comp–att–int	37–54–1	15–15–0
Time of possession	30:05	29:55

Team	Category	Player	Statistics
Idaho State	Passing	Kobe Tracy	37/54, 370 yards, 4 TD, 1 INT
Idaho State	Rushing	Kobe Tracy	9 carries, 38 yards
Idaho State	Receiving	Jeff Weimer	14 receptions, 134 yards
Eastern Washington	Passing	Kekoa Visperas	14/14, 206 yards, 1 TD
Eastern Washington	Rushing	Jared Taylor	18 carries, 160 yards, 3 TD
Eastern Washington	Receiving	Efton Chism	12 receptions, 157 yards, 1 TD

=== vs No. 7 Idaho (rivalry) ===
No. 7 Idaho Vandals (8–3) vs Idaho State Bengals (5–6) – Game summary

Quarter	1	2	3	4	Total
No. 7 Vandals	10	7	13	10	40
Bengals	0	7	3	7	17

at ICCU Dome • Pocatello, Idaho

- Date: November 23
- Game time: 4:00 p.m.
- Game weather: None (indoor stadium)
- Game attendance: 10,032
- Referee: Joh Doe
- TV announcers (ESPN+): Scott Gross (play-by-play) and Kody Graves (analyst)
- Box score, Recap

Game information

First quarter

- IDHO – Emmerson Cortez-Menjivar 41-yard pass from Jack Layne (Cameron Pope kick), 9:19. Vandals 7–0. Drive: 6 plays, 86 yards, 3:19.
- IDHO – Cameron Pope 35-yard field goal, 2:35. Vandals 10–0. Drive: 9 plays, 62 yards, 5:51.

Second quarter

- IDST – Michael Shulikov 8-yard pass from Hunter Hays (Gabe Panikowski kick), 1:04. Vandals 10–7. Drive: 14 plays, 80 yards, 5:16.
- IDHO – Mark Hamper 15-yard pass from Jack Layne (Cameron Pope kick), 0:38. Vandals 17–7. Drive: 3 plays, 27 yards, 0:14.

Third quarter

- IDHO – Andrew Marshall 100-yard kickoff return (Cameron Pope kick), 14:48. Vandals 24–7. Drive: 6 plays, 74 yards, 0:38.
- IDST – Gabe Panikowski 27-yard field goal, 10:45. Vandals 24–10. Drive: 11 plays, 66 yards, 4:03.
- IDHO – Jordan Dwyer 9-yard pass from Jack Layne (PAT blocked), 5:17. Vandals 30–10. Drive: 10 plays, 80 yards, 5:18.

Fourth quarter

- IDST – Kobe Tracy 3-yard run (Gabe Panikowski kick), 10:27. Vandals 30–17. Drive: 7 plays, 45 yards, 2:46.
- IDHO – Cameron Pope 34-yard field goal, 2:46. Vandals 33–17. Drive: 5 plays, 35 yards, 1:50.
- IDHO – Carlos Matheney 9-yard run (Cameron Pope kick), 1:54. Vandals 40–17. Drive: 2 plays, 8 yards, 0:23.

Statistics	IDHO	IDST
First downs	21	24
Plays–yards	58–415	77–373
Rushes–yards	36–181	30–111
Passing yards	234	262
Passing: comp–att–int	17–22–0	29–47–3
Time of possession	31:23	28:37

Team	Category	Player	Statistics
Idaho	Passing	Jack Layne	17/22, 234 yards, 3 TD
Idaho	Rushing	Nate Thomas	21 carries, 171 yards
Idaho	Receiving	Jordan Dwyer	11 receptions, 134 yards, TD
Idaho State	Passing	Kobe Tracy	27/44, 249 yards, 3 INT
Idaho State	Rushing	Dason Brooks	6 carries, 56 yards
Idaho State	Receiving	Michael Shulikov	6 receptions, 61 yards, TD

== Roster ==
2024 Idaho State Bengals football team roster
Players
Coaches
Offense

Pos.	#	Name	Class
WR	0	Damien Morgan	So
QB	1	Jordan Cooke	Jr
WR	2	Alfred Jordan Jr.	Sr
WR	4	Aaron Blancas	Sr
QB	5	Brett Spencer	Fr
WR	6	Jeff Weimer	Sr
QB	7	Hunter Hays	Sr
QB	8	Jackson Sharman	Fr
WR	9	Tsion Nunnally	Jr
WR	11	Ian Duarte	Fr
WR	13	Raiden Brown	Fr
WR	14	Michael Shulikov	Jr
WR	15	Christian Fredericksen	Sr
QB	16	Kobe Tracy	Sr
QB	18	Davis Harsin	Fr
RB	20	Donald Austin	Sr
RB	21	Justice Jackson	Sr
WR	22	Aidan Garcia	So
RB	23	Carson Sudbury	Fr
RB	24	Keoua Kauhi II	Sr
RB	25	Jackson Riddle	Fr
RB	28	Dason Brooks	So
WR	29	Robert Vega	Jr
RB	32	Hunter Roddy	So
OL	50	Alex Ramirez	Sr
OL	51	Stryker Rashid	So
OL	53	Messiyah Moye	Sr
OL	54	Jorgen Miller	So
OL	55	Gunnar Clark	So
OL	57	Exander Miller	Fr
OL	58	Vicente Hughes	Sr
OL	60	Hunter Hill	So
OL	60	Noah Tandy	Fr
OL	61	Zachary Shiroma	Jr
OL	62	William Davis	So
OL	66	Justin Frost	Fr
OL	68	Miguel Santos	Fr
OL	71	Messiah Johnson	Fr
OL	72	Ty Hyde	Sr
OL	73	Talin Togiai	So
OL	75	Jake Hellmann	Jr
OL	76	Jaedon Garcia	So
OL	77	Osiel Moreno	So
OL	78	Josiah Sagale	So
WR	80	Julian Mason	So
WR	81	Braden Albrecht	Fr
WR	82	Jeremiah Crum	Jr
WR	83	Josh Ball	Fr
WR	84	Taylor Freeman	Fr
WR	85	Davian Munoz	Fr
WR	86	Kolton Tanner	Fr
WR	88	Eric Johnson	GS
WR	89	Adam Watts	Fr

Defense

Pos.	#	Name	Class
LB	0	Adrian Rodriguez	Jr
CB	1	Josh Alford	Sr
CB	2	Tylor Bohannon	Sr
LB	4	Kris Sanchez	Sr
S	5	Jayden Bell	So
S	6	Calvin Pitcher	Sr
LB	7	Nathan Reynolds	So
LB	8	Teilor Tuioti	Sr
S	9	Jayden Davis	Jr
LB	10	Jagger Giles	Sr
S	11	Junior Damuni	Jr
S	12	Janari Boone	So
CB	13	Jackson Daniels	Fr
S	14	Dekker Hagler	Fr
CB	15	Noa Calaycay	Fr
LB	16	Devin Rodriguez	Fr
S	17	Damir Abdullah	Jr
S	18	Makeo Sneddon	Fr
CB	20	Jaylon Brown	Jr
S	21	Rylan Leathers	Fr
S	22	Mason Young	Jr
S	23	Cam Gherardi	Fr
CB	24	Adonijah Richards	So
DL	25	Cortland Horton	Sr
S	26	Mathew Sanchez	Sr
LB	27	Vaeaega Gasu	Jr
LB	28	Kaiden Villaro	Fr
CB	31	Mike Lindsay	Fr
S	32	Kolton Kirby	So
CB	34	Deville Dickerson	So
DL	35	Louie Cresto	Jr
CB	36	Sanborne Melson	So
DL	38	Leka Tu'akoi	Fr
LB	39	Darrell Gipson	Fr
DL	42	Maka Tu'akoi	Jr
DL	43	Tuaoa Tauili'ili	So
LB	44	Jacob Perez	Fr
LB	45	Emmitt Sallee	So
DL	46	Logan George	So
DL	47	Zack Conner	Sr
LB	48	Brody Swearhart	Fr
DL	51	Curtis Hill	Jr
DL	52	Spencer Tatafu	Sr
LB	56	Kall Renner	So
DL	59	Brady Phillips	Fr
DL	90	Beau Jaques	So
DL	91	Joseph Perez-Garibay	Jr
DL	92	Zion To'oto'o	So
DL	94	Malik Richardson	Fr
LB	95	Frank Kissick	Fr
DL	96	David Rowe	Sr
DL	98	Jake East	Fr
DL	99	Qai Smith	Jr

Special teams

Pos.	#	Name	Class
K	26	Mason Lindberg	Fr
LS	37	Scott Atkinson	Sr
K	40	Gabe Panikowski	So
K	49	Ross Bolger	Sr
LS	70	Ryan Carter	So
K	93	Ethan Cutler	So

Head coach

- Cody Hawkins

Coordinators/assistant coaches

- Josh Runda – Defensive coordinator
- Buddy Blevins – Co-offensive coordinator
- Dynomite Kuhn – Director of football operations
- Jacob Thomas – Running backs/run game coordinator
- Nick Alaimalo – Inside receivers/associate special teams coordinator
- Scott Thiessen – Safeties
- John Hughes – Offensive line
- Devin Holiday – Cornerbacks
- Keith Price – Wide receivers
- Kolney Cassel – Quarterbacks
- Cody Crawford – Defensive line
- Isaiah Lee – Assistant defensive line
- Jeff Pitman – Assistant head coach/director of football strength & conditioning & culture
- Dan Hawkins – Director of player & staff development
- Brandon Stephens – Director of strength & conditioning
- Jarrett Meeker – Offensive analyst/video coordinator
- Michael Davis – Graduate assistant
- Mykal Tuiolosega-Siufanua – Graduate assistant - strength & conditioning
- Dustin Enslinger – Head athletic trainer
- Ryan Barker – Director of equipment operations

Legend

- (C) Team captain
- (S) Suspended
- (I) Ineligible
- Injured
- Redshirt

Roster
Last update: July 13, 2024
