= 2024 Weber State Wildcats football team =

American college football season

2024 Weber State Wildcats football
- Conference: Big Sky Conference
- Record: 4–8 (3–5 Big Sky)
- Head coach: Mickey Mental (2nd season)
- Offensive scheme: Power spread
- Co-defensive coordinators: Grant Duff (4th season); Joe Dale (4th season)
- Base defense: Multiple 4–3
- Home stadium: Stewart Stadium

2024 Big Sky Conference football standings
	Conf.			Overall
Team	W		L	W		L
No. 2 Montana State $^	8	–	0	15	–	1
No. 5 UC Davis ^	7	–	1	11	–	3
No. 7 Idaho ^	6	–	2	10	–	4
No. 22 Northern Arizona ^	6	–	2	8	–	5
No. 10 Montana ^	5	–	3	9	–	5
Idaho State	3	–	5	5	–	7
Eastern Washington	3	–	5	4	–	8
Weber State	3	–	5	4	–	8
Portland State	3	–	5	3	–	8
Cal Poly	2	–	6	3	–	8
Sacramento State	1	–	7	3	–	9
Northern Colorado	1	–	7	1	–	11
$ – Conference champion; ^ – FCS playoff participant; Rankings from STATS Poll

The 2024 Weber State Wildcats football team represented Weber State University as a member of the Big Sky Conference during the 2024 NCAA Division I FCS football season. The Wildcats were led by second-year head coach Mickey Mental and played at Stewart Stadium in Ogden, Utah.

== Schedule ==
Date	Time	Opponent	Rank	Site	TV	Result	Attendance
August 31	9:00 p.m.	at Washington*	No. 22	Husky Stadium; Seattle, WA	BTN	L 3–35	66,984
September 7	6:00 p.m.	Portland State	No. 24	Stewart Stadium; Ogden, UT	ESPN+	W 43–16	8,463
September 14	5:00 pm	at Lamar*	No. 20	Provost Umphrey Stadium; Beaumont, TX	ESPN+	L 16–17	5,981
September 21	5:00 p.m.	at Northwestern State*		Harry Turpin Stadium; Natchitoches, LA	ESPN+	W 39–0	6,736
September 28	6:00 p.m.	McNeese*	No. 25	Stewart Stadium; Ogden, UT	ESPN+	L 26–28	8,941
October 5	1:00 p.m.	at No. 8 Montana		Washington–Grizzly Stadium; Missoula, MT	ESPN+	W 55–48 ^{OT}	25,888
October 12	6:00 p.m.	Northern Colorado^{†}	No. 20	Stewart Stadium; Ogden, UT	ESPN+	L 17–21	10,345
October 19	7:00 p.m.	at Sacramento State		Hornet Stadium; Sacramento, CA	ESPN+	L 48–51 ^{2OT}	15,530
November 2	2:00 p.m.	at Northern Arizona		Walkup Skydome; Flagstaff, AZ	ESPN+	L 6–27	6,154
November 9	1:00 p.m.	Idaho State		Stewart Stadium; Ogden, UT	ESPN+	L 35–43	7,223
November 16	6:00 p.m.	at No. 8 Idaho		Kibbie Dome; Moscow, ID	ESPN+	L 24–31	9,851
November 23	1:00 p.m.	Cal Poly		Stewart Stadium; Ogden, UT	ESPN+	W 28–17	4,279
*Non-conference game; ^{†}Homecoming; Rankings from STATS Poll released prior to the game; All times are in Mountain time

== Rankings ==
Ranking movements Legend: ██ Increase in ranking ██ Decrease in ranking — = Not ranked RV = Received votes
	Week													
Poll	Pre	1	2	3	4	5	6	7	8	9	10	11	12	Final
STATS	22	24	20	RV	25	RV	20	RV	—	—	—	—		
Coaches	RV	RV	25	RV	RV	RV	23	RV	—	—	—	—		

== Game summaries ==
=== at Washington (FBS) ===
Game One – No. 22 Weber State Wildcats (0–0) vs Washington Huskies (FBS) (0–0) – Game summary

Quarter	1	2	3	4	Total
No. 22 Wildcats	0	0	3	0	3
Huskies (FBS)	0	14	14	7	35

at Husky Stadium • Seattle, WA

- Date: Saturday August 31, 2024
- Game time: 9:00 PM MST
- Game weather: Clear, 76 °F (24 °C), Wind: NE 6mph
- Game attendance: 66,984
- Referee: Francisco Villar
- TV announcers (BTN): Jeff Levering (play-by-play), Jake Butt (color analyst), Lincoln Kennedy (color analyst), Brooke Fletcher (sideline reporter)

Game information

First quarter

No scoring

Second quarter

- (12:15) UW – Jonah Coleman 5-yard run, Grady Gross kick (Drive: 7 plays, 65 yards, 2:45; Washington 7–0)
- (2:53) UW – Decker DeGraaf 33-yard pass from Will Rogers, Grady Gross kick (Drive: 4 plays, 72 yards, 1:29; Washington 14–0)

Third quarter

- (8:53) UW – Jonah Coleman 5-yard run, Grady Gross kick (Drive: 12 plays, 90 yards, 5:55; Washington 21–0)
- (3:50) UW – Jonah Coleman 1-yard run, Grady Gross kick (Drive: 7 plays, 65 yards, 3:47; Washington 28–0)
- (0:19) WEB – Kyle Thompson 28-yard field goal (Drive: 12 plays, 56 yards, 3:25; Washington 28–3)

Fourth quarter

- (11:52) UW – Denzel Boston 6-yard pass from Demond Williams Jr., Grady Gross kick (Drive: 7 plays, 74 yards, 3:22; Washington 35–3)

Statistics	WEB	WASH
First downs	16	25
Total yards	253	482
Rushing yards	155	204
Passing yards	98	278
Passing: Comp–Att–Int	11–32–0	23–32–0
Time of possession	29:29	30:31

Team	Category	Player	Statistics
Weber State	Passing	Ritchie Munoz	11-32, 98 yards
Weber State	Rushing	Damon Bankston	16 carries, 108 yards
Weber State	Receiving	Tajon Evans	1 reception, 26 yards
Washington	Passing	Will Rogers	20-26, 250 yards, 1 TD
Washington	Rushing	Jonah Coleman	16 carries, 127 yards
Washington	Receiving	Giles Jackson	10 receptions, 98 yards

=== vs. Portland State ===
Game Two – Portland State Vikings (0–1) vs No. 24 Weber State Wildcats (0–1) – Game summary

Quarter	1	2	3	4	Total
Vikings	0	0	0	0	0
No. 24 Wildcats	0	0	0	0	0

at Stewart Stadium • Ogden, UT

- Date: Saturday September 7, 2024
- Game time: 6:00 PM MST
- Game weather: 0 °F (−18 °C)
- TV announcers (ESPN+): TBD

Game information

First quarter
Second quarter
Third quarter
Fourth quarter

Statistics	PRST	WEB
First downs		
Total yards		
Rushing yards		
Passing yards		
Passing: Comp–Att–Int		
Time of possession		

Team	Category	Player	Statistics
Portland State	Passing		
Portland State	Rushing		
Portland State	Receiving		
Weber State	Passing		
Weber State	Rushing		
Weber State	Receiving		

=== at Lamar ===
Game Three – No. 20 Weber State Wildcats (1–1) at Lamar Cardinals (1–1) – Game summary

Quarter	1	2	3	4	Total
No. 20 Wildcats	0	10	6	0	16
Cardinals	3	7	7	0	17

at Provost Umphrey Stadium, Beaumont, Texas

- Date: September 14
- Game time: 5:00 p.m.
- Game weather: Wind:SW 8mph • Weather: Sunny • Temp: 90
- Game attendance: 5,981
- Referee: Craig Heiser
- TV: ESPN+
- Box score

Game information

First Quarter

- (7:42) LAM – Esqueda, Chris 23 yd field goal 8 plays, 77 yards, Cardinals 0–3. Drive: 14 plays, 69 yards, TOP 07:10

Second Quarter

- (7:20) LAM – Rhea, Sevonne 7 yd pass from Longino, Jakolby (Esqueda, Chris kick), Cardinals 0–10. Drive: 11 plays, 82 yards, TOP 05:37
- (3:07) WSU – Thompson, Kyle 42 yd field goal, Cardinals 3–10. Drive: 11 plays, 50 yards, TOP 04:13
- (2:20) WSU – Pate, Montae 30 yd interception (Thompson, Kyle), Tied 10–10.

Third Quarter

- (11:14) WSU – May, Colter 2 yd pass from Munoz, Richie ( ), Wildcats 16–10. Drive: 9 plays, 65 yards, TOP 03:37
- (9:00) LAM – Moore, Damien 72 yd pass from Longino, Jakolby (Esqueda, Chris kick), Cardinals 16–17. Drive: 4 plays, 80 yards, TOP 02:06

Fourth Quarter

- No scores

Statistics	WEB	LAM
First downs	18	16
Total yards	66–331	62–385
Rushing yards	36–147	42–203
Passing yards	185	182
Turnovers	1	1
Time of possession	27:33	32:21

Team	Category	Player	Statistics
Weber State	Passing	Richie Munoz	22/30, 184 yards, 1 TD
Weber State	Rushing	Damon Bankston	23 carries, 84 yards 1 TD
Weber State	Receiving	Jacob Sharp	7 receptions, 81 yards
Lamar	Passing	Jakolby Longino	5/6, 121 yards, 2 TD
Lamar	Rushing	Khalan Griffin	21 carries, 91 yards
Lamar	Receiving	Damien Moore	1 reception, 72 yards 1 TD

=== at Northwestern State ===
Game Four – Weber State Wildcats (1–2) at Northwestern State Demons (0–3) – Game summary

Quarter	1	2	3	4	Total
Wildcats	10	17	9	3	39
Demons	0	0	0	0	0

at Harry Turpin Stadium, Natchitoches, Louisiana

- Date: September 21
- Game time: 5:00 p.m.
- Game weather: Sunny, 92 °F (33 °C)
- Game attendance: 6,736
- Referee: James Brookhart
- TV announcers (ESPN+): Patrick Netherton (play-by-play) and Gary Reasons (analyst)

Game information

First quarter

- WEB – Kyle Thompson 29-yard field goal, 4:22. Wildcats 3–0. Drive: 8 plays, 52 yards, 3:14.
- WEB – Jacob Sharp 35-yard pass from Richie Munoz (Sloan Calder kick), 0:19. Wildcats 10–0. Drive: 2 plays, 50 yards, 0:37.

Second quarter

- WEB – Damon Bankston 7-yard run (Sloan Calder kick), 10:47. Wildcats 17–0. Drive: 9 plays, 60 yards, 3:21.
- WEB – Sloan Calder 28-yard field goal, 5:28. Wildcats 20–0. Drive: 9 plays, 29 yards, 3:01.
- WEB – Jaden Thrower 17-yard pass from Richie Munoz (Sloan Calder kick), 2:40. Wildcats 27–0. Drive: 3 plays, 81 yards, 1:10.

Third quarter

- WEB – Jayleen Record 33-yard pass from Richie Munoz (Sloan Calder kick), 12:14. Wildcats 34–0. Drive: 5 plays, 60 yards, 2:41.
- WEB – J. T. Fayard tackled in own end zone, 7:57. Wildcats 36–0.

Fourth quarter

- WEB – Sloan Calder 20-yard field goal, 10:53. Wildcats 39–0. Drive: 10 plays, 52 yards, 4:01.

Statistics	WEB	NWST
First downs	20	9
Total yards	433	157
Rushing yards	106	84
Passing yards	327	73
Turnovers	1	1
Time of possession	30:27	29:33

Team	Category	Player	Statistics
Weber State	Passing	Richie Munoz	19/31, 327 yards, 3 TD, INT
Weber State	Rushing	Damon Bankston	10 rushes, 56 yards, TD
Weber State	Receiving	Jacob Sharp	8 receptions, 119 yards, TD
Northwestern State	Passing	J. T. Fayard	13/24, 68 yards
Northwestern State	Rushing	Kolbe Burrell	5 rushes, 60 yards
Northwestern State	Receiving	Twon Hines	3 receptions, 27 yards

=== vs. McNeese ===
Game Five – McNeese Cowboys (3–2) vs No. 25 Weber State Wildcats (2–2) – Game summary

Quarter	1	2	3	4	Total
Cowboys	0	0	0	0	0
No. 25 Wildcats	0	0	0	0	0

at Stewart Stadium, Ogden, Utah

- Date: Saturday September 28, 2024
- Game time: 6:00 p.m. MDT
- TV announcers (ESPN+): TBD

Game information

First quarter
Second quarter
Third quarter
Fourth quarter

Statistics	MCN	WEB
First downs		
Total yards		
Rushing yards		
Passing yards		
Passing: Comp–Att–Int		
Time of possession		

Team	Category	Player	Statistics
McNeese	Passing		
McNeese	Rushing		
McNeese	Receiving		
Weber State	Passing		
Weber State	Rushing		
Weber State	Receiving		

=== at No. 8 Montana ===
Game Six – Weber State Wildcats (2–3) at No. 8 Montana Grizzlies (4–1) – Game summary

Quarter	1	2	3	4	OT	Total
Wildcats	14	14	3	17	7	55
No. 8 Grizzlies	7	10	6	25	0	48

at Washington-Grizzly Stadium, Missoula, MT

- Date: Saturday October 5, 2024
- Game time: 1:00 p.m. MDT
- TV announcers (ESPN+): Jay Kohn (play-by-play), Marty Mornhinweg (analyst) and Kyle Hansen (sideline)

Statistics	WEB	MONT
First downs		
Total yards		
Rushing yards		
Passing yards		
Turnovers		
Time of possession		

Team	Category	Player	Statistics
Weber State	Passing		
Weber State	Rushing		
Weber State	Receiving		
Montana	Passing		
Montana	Rushing		
Montana	Receiving		

=== vs. Northern Colorado ===
Game Seven – Northern Colorado Bears (0–6) vs No. 20 Weber State Wildcats (3–3) – Game summary

Quarter	1	2	3	4	Total
Bears	0	0	0	0	0
No. 20 Wildcats	0	0	0	0	0

at Stewart Stadium, Ogden, UT

- Date: Saturday October 12, 2024
- Game time: 6:00 p.m. MDT
- TV announcers (ESPN+): TBD

Game information

First quarter
Second quarter
Third quarter
Fourth quarter

Statistics	UNCO	WEB
First downs		
Total yards		
Rushing yards		
Passing yards		
Passing: Comp–Att–Int		
Time of possession		

Team	Category	Player	Statistics
Northern Colorado	Passing		
Northern Colorado	Rushing		
Northern Colorado	Receiving		
Weber State	Passing		
Weber State	Rushing		
Weber State	Receiving		

=== at Sacramento State ===
Game Eight – Weber State Wildcats (3–4) vs Sacramento State Hornets (2–4) – Game summary

Quarter	1	2	3	4	Total
Wildcats	0	0	0	0	0
Hornets	0	0	0	0	0

at Hornet Stadium • Sacramento, CA

- Date: Saturday October 19, 2024
- Game time: 7:00 PM MST
- Game weather: 0 °F (−18 °C)
- TV announcers (ESPN+): Jason Ross (play-by-play) and Darren Arbet (analyst)

Game information

First quarter
Second quarter
Third quarter
Fourth quarter

Statistics	WEB	SAC
First downs		
Total yards		
Rushing yards		
Passing yards		
Passing: Comp–Att–Int		
Time of possession		

Team	Category	Player	Statistics
Weber State	Passing		
Weber State	Rushing		
Weber State	Receiving		
Sacramento State	Passing		
Sacramento State	Rushing		
Sacramento State	Receiving		

=== at Northern Arizona ===
Game Nine – Weber State Wildcats (3–5) vs Northern Arizona Lumberjacks (4–4) – Game summary

Quarter	1	2	3	4	Total
Wildcats	0	0	0	0	0
Lumberjacks	0	0	0	0	0

at Walkup Skydome • Flagstaff, AZ

- Date: Saturday November 2, 2024
- Game time: 2:00 PM MST
- Game weather: 0 °F (−18 °C)
- TV announcers (ESPN+): TBD

Game information

First quarter
Second quarter
Third quarter
Fourth quarter

Statistics	WEB	NAU
First downs		
Total yards		
Rushing yards		
Passing yards		
Passing: Comp–Att–Int		
Time of possession		

Team	Category	Player	Statistics
Weber State	Passing		
Weber State	Rushing		
Weber State	Receiving		
Northern Arizona	Passing		
Northern Arizona	Rushing		
Northern Arizona	Receiving		

=== Idaho State ===
Game Ten – Idaho State Bengals (4–5) at Weber State Wildcats (3–6) – Game summary

Quarter	1	2	3	4	Total
Bengals	0	0	0	0	0
Wildcats	0	0	0	0	0

at Stewart Stadium • Ogden, UT

- Date: Saturday November 9, 2024
- Game time: 1:00 PM MST
- TV announcers (ESPN+): TBD

Game information

First quarter
Second quarter
Third quarter
Fourth quarter

Statistics	IDST	WEB
First downs		
Total yards		
Rushing yards		
Passing yards		
Passing: Comp–Att–Int		
Time of possession		

Team	Category	Player	Statistics
Idaho State	Passing		
Idaho State	Rushing		
Idaho State	Receiving		
Weber State	Passing		
Weber State	Rushing		
Weber State	Receiving		

=== at No. 8 Idaho ===
Game Eleven – Weber State Wildcats (3–7) vs No. 8 Idaho Vandals (7–3) – Game summary

Quarter	1	2	3	4	Total
Wildcats	0	0	0	0	0
No. 8 Vandals	0	0	0	0	0

at Kibbie Dome • Moscow, ID

- Date: Saturday November 16, 2024
- Game time: 6:00 PM MST
- Game weather: 0 °F (−18 °C)
- TV announcers (ESPN+): TBD

Game information

First quarter
Second quarter
Third quarter
Fourth quarter

Statistics	WEB	IDHO
First downs		
Total yards		
Rushing yards		
Passing yards		
Passing: Comp–Att–Int		
Time of possession		

Team	Category	Player	Statistics
Weber State	Passing		
Weber State	Rushing		
Weber State	Receiving		
Idaho	Passing		
Idaho	Rushing		
Idaho	Receiving		

=== Cal Poly ===
Game Twelve – Cal Poly Mustangs (3–7) at Weber State Wildcats (3–8) – Game summary

Quarter	1	2	3	4	Total
Mustangs	0	0	0	0	0
Wildcats	0	0	0	0	0

at Stewart Stadium • Ogden, UT

- Date: Saturday November 23, 2024
- Game time: 1:00 PM MST
- TV announcers (ESPN+): TBD

Game information

First quarter
Second quarter
Third quarter
Fourth quarter

Statistics	CP	WEB
First downs		
Total yards		
Rushing yards		
Passing yards		
Passing: Comp–Att–Int		
Time of possession		

Team	Category	Player	Statistics
Cal Poly	Passing		
Cal Poly	Rushing		
Cal Poly	Receiving		
Weber State	Passing		
Weber State	Rushing		
Weber State	Receiving		
