= Efton Chism =

American football player (born 2001)

No. 86 – New England Patriots
- Positions: Wide receiver, kickoff returner
- Roster status: Active

Personal information
- Born: October 26, 2001 (age 25); Kirkland, Washington, U.S.
- Listed height: 5 ft 10 in (1.78 m)
- Listed weight: 198 lb (90 kg)

Career information
- High school: Monroe (Monroe, Washington)
- College: Eastern Washington (2020–2024)
- NFL draft: 2025: undrafted

Career history
- New England Patriots (2025–present)

Awards and highlights
- First-team FCS All-American (2024)

Career NFL statistics as of Week 8, 2026
- Receptions: 18
- Receiving yards: 226
- Receiving touchdowns: 2
- Return yards: 401
- Stats at Pro Football Reference

Efton Chism III (CHIH-zum; born October 26, 2001) is an American professional football wide receiver and kickoff returner for the New England Patriots of the National Football League (NFL). He played college football for the Eastern Washington Eagles.

== Early life ==
Chism attended Monroe High School in Monroe, Washington, and committed to play college football for the Eastern Washington Eagles.

== College career ==
In his first two collegiate season in 2020 and 2021, Chism made 87 catches for 1,075 yards and 12 touchdowns in 21 games for the Eagles. In 2022, he made ten starts and notched 62 catches for 607 yards and six touchdowns. In 2023, Chism hauled in 84 passes for 932 yards and eight touchdowns, earning FCS third-team all-American honors. In the 2024 season opener, he tallied 12 receptions for 173 yards and three touchdowns in a win over Monmouth. In week 12, Chism hauled in 12 receptions for 157 yards and a touchdown in a win over Idaho State. In the 2024 regular season finale, he set the program single-season receptions record on a 67-yard touchdown reception, which had been held by Cooper Kupp. Chism finished the 2024 season with 120 receptions for 1,311 yards and 13 touchdowns, earning FCS first-team All-American honors. After the season, he declared for the 2025 NFL draft and accepted invitations to participate in the 2025 Hula Bowl and the 2025 East-West Shrine Bowl.

=== College statistics ===
| Season | Team | GP | Receiving | | | | | | |
| Season | Team | GP | Rec | R/G | Yds | Y/G | Avg | Lng | TD |
|---|---|---|---|---|---|---|---|---|---|
| 2020 | Eastern Washington | 7 | 23 | 3.3 | 267 | 38.1 | 11.6 | 26 | 1 |
| 2021 | Eastern Washington | 13 | 57 | 4.4 | 735 | 56.5 | 12.9 | 36 | 9 |
| 2022 | Eastern Washington | 10 | 62 | 6.2 | 607 | 60.7 | 9.8 | 50 | 6 |
| 2023 | Eastern Washington | 11 | 84 | 7.6 | 932 | 84.7 | 11.1 | 46 | 8 |
| 2024 | Eastern Washington | 12 | 120 | 10.0 | 1,311 | 109.3 | 10.9 | 67 | 13 |
| Total | | 53 | 346 | 6.5 | 3,852 | 72.7 | 11.1 | 67 | 37 |

== Professional career ==
Pre-draft measurables
| Height | Weight | Arm length | Hand span | Wingspan | 40-yard dash | 10-yard split | 20-yard split | 20-yard shuttle | Three-cone drill | Vertical jump | Broad jump | Bench press |
|---|---|---|---|---|---|---|---|---|---|---|---|---|
| 5 ft 10 1/2 in (1.79 m) | 193 lb (88 kg) | 30 1/2 in (0.77 m) | 9 in (0.23 m) | 6 ft 1 1/2 in (1.87 m) | 4.71 s | 1.62 s | 2.72 s | 4.06 s | 6.77 s | 34.5 in (0.88 m) | 9 ft 10 in (3.00 m) | 16 reps |
All values from Pro Day

=== New England Patriots (2025-present) ===
==== 2025 ====
In the months leading up to the 2025 NFL draft, Chism had visits with six teams. On May 9, 2025, Chism signed with the New England Patriots as an undrafted free agent after going unselected in the 2025 NFL draft, citing a recruitment call from head coach Mike Vrabel and offensive coordinator Josh McDaniels' work with "undersized receivers" among the factors in his decision. Denver Broncos head coach Sean Payton also pursued Chism in the UDFA process. The Patriots gave Chism a $25,000 signing bonus and an additional $234,000 in guaranteed salary; his $259,000 in guarantees is more than any of the Patriots' seventh-round draft picks received. After a strong preseason, where Chism recorded 12 catches for 121 yards and two touchdowns, he survived final roster cuts and made the 53-man roster.

Chism was inactive for the first five games, while working extensively with the Patriots scout team in practices. Chism made his debut in Week 6 against the New Orleans Saints, in which he played as a kick returner. In Week 17 against the New York Jets, with Kayshon Boutte and Mack Hollins injured, Chism had the first regular-season catches of his NFL career. He caught both of the passes targeted at him, a 30-yard pass and a 10-yard touchdown from Drake Maye in the Patriots' 42–10 blowout win.

==== 2026 ====
Against the Buffalo Bills in Week 4, Chism had 2 catches for 42 yards on the game-winning drive, including a 23-yard pass Chism caught one-handed for a touchdown.

== Career statistics ==
Offense Stats
| Year | Team | Games | | Receiving | | | | | | | Rushing | | | | | Passing | | | | | | |
| Year | Team | GP | GS | tgt | rec | yds | y/r | lng | td | 1d | att | yds | lng | td | 1d | aat | cmp | ydrs | lng | td | Int | 1d |
|---|---|---|---|---|---|---|---|---|---|---|---|---|---|---|---|---|---|---|---|---|---|---|
| 2025 | NE | 8 | 1 | 3 | 3 | 75 | 25.5 | 35 | 1 | 3 | 0 | 0 | 0 | 0 | 0 | 0 | 0 | 0 | 0 | 0 | 0 | 0 |
| 2026 | NE | 5 | 2 | 14 | 9 | 98 | 10.9 | 23 | 1 | 7 | 1 | 2 | 2 | 0 | 0 | 1 | 1 | 16 | 16 | 0 | 0 | 0 |
| | | 13 | 3 | 17 | 12 | 173 | 14.4 | 35 | 2 | 10 | 1 | 2 | 2 | 0 | 0 | 1 | 1 | 16 | 16 | 0 | 0 | 0 |

Special Teams Stats
| Year | Team | Games | | Punt Returns | | | | | Kick Returns | | | | | Tackles | | | |
| Year | Team | GP | GS | Ret | yds | PRFT | lng | y/ret | Ret | yds | KRTD | lng | Y/Ret | comb | solo | ast | tfl |
|---|---|---|---|---|---|---|---|---|---|---|---|---|---|---|---|---|---|
| 2025 | NE | 8 | 1 | 0 | 0 | 0 | 0 | 0 | 16 | 383 | 0 | 31 | 23.9 | 0 | 0 | 0 | 0 |
| 2026 | NE | 5 | 2 | 1 | 18 | 0 | 18 | 18 | 0 | 0 | 0 | 0 | 0 | 1 | 1 | 0 | 0 |
| | | 13 | 3 | 1 | 18 | 0 | 18 | 18 | 16 | 383 | 0 | 0 | 0 | 1 | 1 | 0 | 0 |

== Personal life ==
Chism is the nephew of former FCS All-American linebacker Derek Strey.
