= 2025 Lamar Cardinals football team =

American college football season

2025 Lamar Cardinals football

NCAA Division I First Round, L 20–38 vs. Abilene Christian
- Conference: Southland Conference

Ranking
- STATS: No. 24
- FCS Coaches: No. 21
- Record: 8–5 (5–3 SLC)
- Head coach: Peter Rossomando (3rd season)
- Offensive coordinator: Ryan McCarthy (1st season)
- Offensive scheme: Spread
- Defensive coordinator: Drew Christ (3rd season)
- Base defense: 4–3
- Home stadium: Provost Umphrey Stadium

2025 Southland Conference football standings
	Conf.			Overall
Team	W		L	W		L
No. 7 Stephen F. Austin $^	8	–	0	11	–	3
No. 19 Southeastern Louisiana ^	7	–	1	9	–	4
No. 24 Lamar ^	5	–	3	8	–	5
UT Rio Grande Valley	5	–	3	9	–	3
Nicholls	4	–	4	4	–	8
McNeese	4	–	4	5	–	7
East Texas A&M	3	–	5	3	–	9
Incarnate Word	3	–	5	5	–	7
Houston Christian	1	–	7	2	–	10
Northwestern State	0	–	8	1	–	11
$ – Conference champion; ^ – FCS playoff participant; Rankings from STATS Poll

The 2025 Lamar Cardinals football team represented Lamar University in the 2025 NCAA Division I FCS football season. The Cardinals played their home games at Provost Umphrey Stadium in Beaumont, Texas, and competed in the Southland Conference. They were led by third-year head coach Pete Rossomando.

== Schedule ==
Date	Time	Opponent	Rank	Site	TV	Result	Attendance
August 30	7:00 pm	at North Texas*		DATCU Stadium; Denton, TX	ESPN+	L 0–51	20,594
September 6	6:00 pm	No. 4 South Dakota*		Provost Umphrey Stadium; Beaumont, TX	ESPN+	W 20–13	6,043
September 13	6:00 pm	at Texas Southern*	No. 24	Shell Energy Stadium; Houston, TX	SWAC TV	W 31–7	6,247
September 27	6:00 pm	Central Arkansas*	No. 22	Provost Umphrey Stadium; Beaumont, TX	ESPN+	W 35–32	6,326
October 4	3:00 pm	Nicholls	No. 20	Provost Umphrey Stadium; Beaumont, TX	ESPN+	W 24–17	5,433
October 11	6:00 pm	at East Texas A&M	No. 20	Ernest Hawkins Field at Memorial Stadium; Commerce, TX	ESPN+	W 33–23	2,713
October 18	3:00 pm	UT Rio Grande Valley^{†}	No. 17	Provost Umphrey Stadium; Beaumont, TX	ESPN+	W 23–21	8,283
October 25	4:00 pm	at Northwestern State	No. 15	Harry Turpin Stadium; Natchitoches, LA	ESPN+	W 41–14	8,761
November 1	2:00 pm	at Incarnate Word	No. 14	Gayle and Tom Benson Stadium; San Antonio, TX	ESPN+	L 17–24	2,680
November 8	3:00 pm	No. 19 Southeastern Louisiana	No. 20	Provost Umphrey Stadium; Beaumont, TX	ESPN+	W 14–12	6,183
November 15	6:00 pm	at No. 15 Stephen F. Austin	No. 19	Homer Bryce Stadium; Nacogdoches, TX	ESPN+	L 15–26	1,025
November 22	3:00 pm	McNeese	No. 19	Provost Umphrey Stadiuim; Beaumont, TX (Battle of the Border)	ESPN+	L 19–21	13,674
November 29	12:00 p.m.	at No. 13 Abilene Christian*	No. 25	Wildcat Stadium; Abilene, TX (NCAA Division I First Round)	ESPN+	L 20–32	4,588
*Non-conference game; ^{†}Homecoming; Rankings from STATS Poll released prior to the game; All times are in Central time

== Game summaries ==
=== at North Texas (FBS) ===
Lamar Cardinals (0–0) at North Texas Mean Green (FBS) (0–0) – Game summary

Quarter	1	2	3	4	Total
Cardinals	0	0	0	0	0
Mean Green (FBS)	13	24	14	0	51

at DATCU Stadium • Denton, Texas

- Date: August 30
- Game time: 7:00 PM CDT
- Game weather: Cloudy • Temperature: 80 °F (27 °C) • Wind: NE at 8 miles per hour (13 km/h)
- Game attendance: 20,594
- Referee: Kevin Randall
- TV announcers (ESPN+): Justin Kutcher (play-by-play) and LaDarrin McLane (analyst)

Game information

First quarter

- UNT – Drew Mestemaker 2-yard run (pass failed), 11:21. Mean Green 6–0. Drive: 8 plays, 75 yards, 3:39.
- UNT – Makenzie McGill 1-yard run (Kali Nguma kick), 5:46. Mean Green 13–0. Drive: 9 plays, 65 yards, 2:43.

Second quarter

- UNT – Wyatt Young 5-yard pass from Drew Mestemaker (Kali Nguma kick), 6:35. Mean Green 20–0. Drive: 7 plays, 54 yards, 3:03.
- UNT – Cameron Dorner 25-yard pass from Drew Mestemaker (Kali Nguma kick), 1:53. Mean Green 27–0. Drive: 6 plays, 76 yards, 1:46.
- UNT – Kali Nguma 28-yard field goal, 0:57. Mean Green 30–0. Drive: 4 plays, 7 yards, 0:49.
- UNT – Ethan Wesloski 0-yard fumble return (Kali Nguma kick), 0:27. Mean Green 37–0.

Third quarter

- UNT – Kiefer Sibley 1-yard run (Kali Nguma kick), 11:16. Mean Green 44–0. Drive: 5 plays, 52 yards, 2:04.
- UNT – Wyatt Young 32-yard pass from Drew Mestemaker (Kali Nguma kick), 8:41. Mean Green 51–0. Drive: 4 plays, 62 yards, 1:36.

Fourth quarter

- No scoring plays.

Statistics	LAM	UNT
First downs	8	25
Plays–yards	54–119	73–467
Rushes–yards	27–31	39–138
Passing yards	88	329
Passing: comp–att–int	13–27–1	24–34–0
Turnovers	2	1
Time of possession	26:32	33:28

Team	Category	Player	Statistics
Lamar	Passing	Robert Coleman	13/24, 88 yards, INT
Lamar	Rushing	Major Bowden	6 carries, 21 yards
Lamar	Receiving	Kyndon Fuselier	4 receptions, 45 yards
North Texas	Passing	Drew Mestemaker	24/32, 329 yards, 3 TD
North Texas	Rushing	Kiefer Sibley	6 carries, 38 yards, TD
North Texas	Receiving	Cameron Dorner	7 receptions, 98 yards, TD

=== No. 4 South Dakota ===
No. 4 South Dakota Coyotes (0-1) at Lamar Cardinals (0-1) – Game summary

Quarter	1	2	3	4	Total
No. 4 Coyotes	10	0	3	0	13
Cardinals	3	7	3	7	20

at Provost Umphrey Stadium, Beaumont, Texas

- Date: September 6
- Game time: 6:00 PM CDT
- Game weather: Cloudy • Temperature: 85 °F (29 °C)
- Game attendance: 6,043
- Referee: Craig Hesler
- TV announcers (ESPN+): Dan Gresham (play-by-play) and LeMont Williams (analyst)

Game information
First quarter
- (11:15) SDAK – Jack Martens 11-yard pass from Aidan Bouman, Will Leyland kick (Drive: 7 plays, 75 yards, 3:45; SDAK 7–0)
- (8:45) SDAK – Will Leyland 32-yard field goal (Drive: 4 plays, 5 yards, 1:35; SDAK 10–0)
- (0:25) LAM – Ben Woodard 30-yard field goal (Drive: 15 plays, 69 yards, 8:13; SDAK 10–3)

Second quarter

- (12:36) LAM – Robert Coleman 1-yard run, Ben Woodard kick (Drive: 5 plays, 25 yards, 2:44; Tied 10–10)

Third quarter

- (5:56) LAM – Ben Woodard 26-yard field goal (Drive: 11 plays, 57 yards, 4:57; LAM 13–10)
- (0:34) SDAK – Will Leyland 44-yard field goal (Drive: 10 plays, 45 yards, 5:16; Tied 13–13)

Fourth quarter

- (9:51) LAM – John Robinson 5-yard run, Ben Woodard kick (Drive: 11 plays, 69 yards, 5:37; LAM 20–13)

Statistics	SDAK	LAM
First downs	13	16
Total yards	243	204
Rushing yards	135	139
Passing yards	108	65
Turnovers	3	2
Time of possession	26:29	33:22

Team	Category	Player	Statistics
South Dakota	Passing	Aidan Bouman	10/21, 108 yds, TD INT
South Dakota	Rushing	L. J. Phillips Jr.	14 carries 64 yds
South Dakota	Receiving	Larenzo Fenner	3 receptions, 41 yds
Lamar	Passing	Robert Coleman	8/16, 65 yds, 2 TD
Lamar	Rushing	Major Bowden	14 carries, 49 yds
Lamar	Receiving	Jadyn Girard	3 receptions, 25 yds

=== at Texas Southern ===
No. 24 Lamar Cardinals (1–1) at Texas Southern Tigers (0–2) – Game summary

Quarter	1	2	3	4	Total
No. 24 Cardinals	14	14	0	3	31
Tigers	7	0	0	0	7

at Shell Energy Stadium, Houston, Texas

- Date: September 13
- Game time: 6:00 PM CDT
- Game weather: Sunny • Temperature: 91 °F (33 °C)
- Game attendance: 6,247
- Referee: Preston Clipper
- TV announcers (ESPN+): Butch Alsandor (play-by-play) and Jorge Vargas (analyst)

Statistics	LAM	TXSO
First downs	21	11
Total yards	333	196
Rushing yards	252	143
Passing yards	81	53
Turnovers	1	2
Time of possession	32:38	27:22

Team	Category	Player	Statistics
Lamar	Passing	Aiden McCown	12/22, 81 yds, INT
Lamar	Rushing	LaDamian McDowell	11 carries, 92 yds
Lamar	Receiving	Devyn Gibbs	2 receptions, 31 yds
Texas Southern	Passing	KJ Cooper	13/23, 43 yds INT
Texas Southern	Rushing	Athean Renfro	10 carries, 70 yds, TD
Texas Southern	Receiving	Xavier Phipps	1 reception, 24 yds

=== Central Arkansas ===
Central Arkansas Bears (1–3) at No. 22 Lamar Cardinals (2–1) – Game summary

Quarter	1	2	3	4	Total
Bears	14	3	0	15	32
No. 22 Cardinals	17	7	14	0	38

at Provost Umphrey Stadium, Beaumont, Texas

- Date: September 27
- Game time: 6:00 PM CDT
- Game weather: Sunny • Temperature: 85 °F (29 °C)
- Game attendance: 6,326
- Referee: James Brookhart
- TV announcers (ESPN+): Dan Gresham (play-by-play) and LeMont Williams (analyst)

Statistics	CARK	LAM
First downs	28	19
Total yards	514	293
Rushing yards	144	151
Passing yards	370	142
Turnovers	1	2
Time of possession	33:33	26:27

Team	Category	Player	Statistics
Central Arkansas	Passing	Austin Myers	25/41, 358 yds, 3 TD 2 INT
Central Arkansas	Rushing	Landen Chambers	31 carries, 137 yds, TD
Central Arkansas	Receiving	Arlie Lee	4 receptions, 114 yds, TD
Lamar	Passing	Aiden McCown	13/17, 142 yds, 3 TD, INT
Lamar	Rushing	Xavier Coleman	15 carries, 99 yds
Lamar	Receiving	Kyndon Fuselier	4 receptions, 53 yds, TD

=== Nicholls ===
Nicholls Colonels (1–4) at No. 20 Lamar Cardinals (3–1) – Game summary

Quarter	1	2	3	4	Total
Colonels	14	0	3	0	17
No. 20 Cardinals	7	10	0	7	24

at Provost Umphrey Stadium, Beaumont, Texas

- Date: October 4
- Game time: 3:00 PM CDT
- Game attendance: 5,433
- TV: ESPN+

Statistics	NICH	LAM
First downs	18	16
Total yards	348	337
Rushing yards	175	100
Passing yards	173	237
Turnovers	0	1
Time of possession	31:48	28:12

Team	Category	Player	Statistics
Nicholls	Passing	Deuce Hogan	21/38, 166 yards
Nicholls	Rushing	Shane Lee	3 carries, 109 yards, 1 TD
Nicholls	Receiving	Amari Clayton	3 receptions, 39 yards
Lamar	Passing	Aiden McCown	12/22, 237 yards, 1 TD, 1 INT
Lamar	Rushing	LaDamian McDowell	11 carries, 41 yards
Lamar	Receiving	Blake Thomas	2 receptions, 84 yards, 1 TD

=== at East Texas A&M ===
No. 20 Lamar Cardinals (4–1) at East Texas A&M Lions (1–4) – Game summary

Quarter	1	2	3	4	Total
No. 20 Cardinals	0	3	10	20	33
Lions	10	6	7	0	23

at Ernest Hawkins Field at Memorial Stadium, Commerce, Texas

- Date: October 11
- Game attendance: 2,713
- TV: ESPN+

Statistics	LAM	ETAM
First downs	22	19
Total yards	348	329
Rushing yards	63	115
Passing yards	285	214
Turnovers	1	2
Time of possession	30:57	29:03

Team	Category	Player	Statistics
Lamar	Passing	Aiden McCown	24/33, 285 yards, 1 TD
Lamar	Rushing	Joshua Robinson	7 carries, 27 yards, 1 TD
Lamar	Receiving	Kyndon Fuselier	7 receptions, 71 yards, 1 TD
East Texas A&M	Passing	Ron Peace	20/31, 214 yards
East Texas A&M	Rushing	KJ Shankle	11 carries, 59 yards
East Texas A&M	Receiving	Christian Jourdain	6 receptions, 48 yards

=== UT Rio Grande Valley ===
UT Rio Grande Valley Vaqueros (5–1) at No. 17 Lamar Cardinals (5–1) – Game summary

Quarter	1	2	3	4	Total
Vaqueros	0	7	0	14	21
No. 17 Cardinals	7	13	0	3	23

at Provost Umphrey Stadium, Beaumont, Texas

- Date: October 18
- Game time: 3:00 PM CDT
- Game weather: Cloudy, 80 °F (27 °C)
- Game attendance: 8,283
- Referee: Matt Beck
- TV announcers (ESPN+): Dan Gresham (play-by-play), LeMont Williams (analyst) and Bob Slovack (sideline)

Game information
First quarter
- LAM – Blake Thomas 58-yard pass from Aiden McCown (Ben Woodward kick), 7:02. Cardinals 7–0. Drive: 6 plays, 71 yards, 2:11.

Second quarter

- LAM – Ben Woodward 30-yard field goal, 13:26. Cardinals 10–0. Drive: 11 plays, 71 yards, 5:23.
- LAM – Kyndon Fuselier 15-yard pass from Aiden McCown (Ben Woodward kick), 7:01. Cardinals 17–0. Drive: 10 plays, 65 yards, 4:44.
- RGV – Nathan Denney 5-yard run (Brysen Gardner kick), 2:00. Cardinals 17–7. Drive: 13 plays, 75 yards, 5:01.
- LAM – Ben Woodward 53-yard field goal, 0:00. Cardinals 20–7. Drive: 14 plays, 53 yards, 1:55.

Third quarter

- No scoring plays

Fourth quarter

- RGV – Tavian Cord 4-yard pass from Eddie Lee Marburger (Brysen Gardner kick), 14:52. Cardinals 20–14. Drive: 4 plays, 6 yards, 1:14.
- RGV – Xayvion Noland 9-yard pass from Eddie Lee Marburger (Brysen Gardner kick), 9:38. Vaqueros 21–20. Drive: 3 plays, 25 yards, 1:04.
- LAM – Ben Woodward 57-yard field goal, 1:03. Cardinals 23–21. Drive: 14 plays, 48 yards, 2:18.

Statistics	RGV	LAM
First downs	12	20
Total yards	189	375
Rushing yards	83	155
Passing yards	106	220
Turnovers	1	3
Time of possession	25:14	34:46

Team	Category	Player	Statistics
UT Rio Grande Valley	Passing	Eddie Lee Marburger	9/21, 106 yards, 2 TD, INT
UT Rio Grande Valley	Rushing	Nathan Denney	19 carries, 75 yards, TD
UT Rio Grande Valley	Receiving	Tony Diaz	3 receptions, 51 yards
Lamar	Passing	Aiden McCown	17/23, 203 yards, 2 TD, INT
Lamar	Rushing	Aiden McCown	15 carries, 88 yards
Lamar	Receiving	Blake Thomas	4 receptions, 77 yards, TD

=== at Northwestern State ===
No. 15 Lamar Cardinals (6–1) at Northwestern State Demons (1–6) – Game summary

Quarter	1	2	3	4	Total
No. 15 Cardinals	3	14	7	17	41
Demons	0	7	0	7	14

at Harry Turpin Stadium, Natchitoches, Louisiana

- Date: October 25
- Game time: 4:00 PM CDT
- Game attendance: 8,761
- TV: ESPN+

Statistics	LAM	NWST
First downs	27	13
Total yards	433	307
Rushing yards	256	23
Passing yards	177	284
Turnovers	1	2
Time of possession	37:19	22:41

Team	Category	Player	Statistics
Lamar	Passing	Robert Coleman	18/30, 166 yards, 1 TD
Lamar	Rushing	Xavier Coleman	12 carries, 101 yards, 2 TD
Lamar	Receiving	Kyndon Fuselier	7 receptions, 70 yards, 1 TD
Northwestern State	Passing	Abram Johnston	13/23, 284 yards, 1 TD, 1 INT
Northwestern State	Rushing	Abram Johnston	10 carries, 16 yards, 1 TD
Northwestern State	Receiving	Brendan Webb	4 receptions, 126 yards, 1 TD

=== at Incarnate Word ===
No. 14 Lamar Cardinals (7–1) at Incarnate Word Cardinals (2–6) – Game summary

Quarter	1	2	3	4	Total
No. 14 Cardinals (LU)	0	3	0	14	17
Cardinals (UIW)	7	14	3	0	24

at Gayle and Tom Benson Stadium, San Antonio, Texas

- Date: November 1
- Game time: 2:00 PM CDT
- Game attendance: 2,680
- TV: ESPN+

Statistics	LAM	UIW
First downs	10	17
Total yards	226	246
Rushing yards	44	85
Passing yards	182	161
Turnovers	0	0
Time of possession	25:00	35:00

Team	Category	Player	Statistics
Lamar	Passing	Robert Coleman	18/25, 182 yards, 1 TD
Lamar	Rushing	Major Bowden	4 carries, 20 yards
Lamar	Receiving	JaCorey Hyder	3 receptions, 73 yards
Incarnate Word	Passing	EJ Colson	21/28, 161 yards, 3 TD
Incarnate Word	Rushing	Timothy Carter	10 carries, 36 yards
Incarnate Word	Receiving	Josh Lorick	8 receptions, 90 yards, 1 TD

=== No. 19 Southeastern Louisiana ===
No. 19 Southeastern Louisiana Lions (7–2) at No. 20 Lamar Cardinals (7–2) – Game summary

Quarter	1	2	3	4	Total
No. 19 Lions	0	0	6	6	12
No. 20 Cardinals	0	7	0	7	14

at Provost Umphrey Stadium, Beaumont, Texas

- Date: November 8
- Game time: 3:00 PM CST
- Game attendance: 6,183
- TV: ESPN+

Statistics	SELA	LAM
First downs	11	16
Total yards	292	255
Rushing yards	236	160
Passing yards	56	95
Turnovers	1	2
Time of possession	25:36	34:24

Team	Category	Player	Statistics
Southeastern Louisiana	Passing	Carson Camp	5/11, 56 yards
Southeastern Louisiana	Rushing	Deantre Jackson	14 carries, 146 yards
Southeastern Louisiana	Receiving	Jaylon Domingeaux	2 receptions, 43 yards
Lamar	Passing	Robert Coleman	7/11, 86 yards, 1 TD
Lamar	Rushing	Major Bowden	23 carries, 79 yards, 1 TD
Lamar	Receiving	Britain Simmonms	2 receptions, 35 yards

=== at No. 15 Stephen F. Austin ===
No. 19 Lamar Cardinals (8–2) at No. 15 Stephen F. Austin Lumberjacks (8–2) – Game summary

Quarter	1	2	3	4	Total
No. 19 Cardinals	0	7	0	8	15
No. 15 Lumberjacks	10	3	10	3	26

at Homer Bryce Stadium, Nacogdoches, Texas

- Date: November 15
- Game time: 6:00 PM CST
- Game attendance: 1.025
- TV: ESPN+

Statistics	LAM	SFA
First downs	12	25
Total yards	258	329
Rushing yards	134	180
Passing yards	124	149
Turnovers	1	1
Time of possession	25:09	34:51

Team	Category	Player	Statistics
Lamar	Passing	Aiden McCown	10/14, 78 yards
Lamar	Rushing	LaDamian McDowell	5 carries, 57, 1 TD
Lamar	Receiving	Kyndon Fuselier	5 receptions, 40 yards
Stephen F. Austin	Passing	Gavin Rutherford	17/31, 140 yards, 1 INT
Stephen F. Austin	Rushing	Gavin Rutherford	13 carries, 75 yards, 1 TD
Stephen F. Austin	Receiving	Clayton Wayland	4 receptions, 48 yards

=== McNeese (Battle of the Border) ===
McNeese Cowboys (4–7) at No. 19 Lamar Cardinals (8–3) – Game summary

Quarter	1	2	3	4	Total
Cowboys	0	7	0	14	21
No. 19 Cardinals	7	0	6	6	19

at Provost Umphrey Stadium, Beaumont, Texas

- Date: November 22
- Game time: 3:00 PM CST
- Game attendance: 13,674
- TV: ESPN+

Statistics	MCN	LAM
First downs	20	20
Total yards	362	416
Rushing yards	261	281
Passing yards	101	135
Turnovers	1	2
Time of possession	30:41	29:19

Team	Category	Player	Statistics
McNeese	Passing	Devin Lippold	11/23, 69 yards, 1 TD, 1 INT
McNeese	Rushing	Coleby Hamm	16 carries, 131 yards
McNeese	Receiving	Reed Boyd	2 receptions, 35 yards, 1 TD
Lamar	Passing	Aiden McCown	8/23, 135 yards, 1 TD, 2 INT
Lamar	Rushing	Xavier Coleman	15 carries, 141 yards
Lamar	Receiving	Nyir Jones	1 receptions, 50 yards

== Roster ==
2025 Lamar Cardinals football team roster
Players
Coaches
Offense

Pos.	#	Name	Class
RB	0	Xavier Coleman	Sr
WR	1	Kyndon Fuselier	Sr
RB	2	Major Bowden	Sr
WR	3	Izaha Jones	Sr
WR	4	Cameron George	Sr
WR	5	Britain Simmons	Fr
QB	6	Mekhi Hagens	Jr
WR	7	Jamahdia Whitby	Sr
TE	8	Devyn Gibbs	Sr
TE	9	JaCorey Hyder	Sr
QB	10	Jakolby Longino	Sr
QB	11	Brady Driver	So
QB	12	Lucas Powell	So
WR	13	Jayden Boyd	Jr
QB	14	Aiden McCown	So
RB	15	Joshua Robinson	So
QB	16	Kendric Malone	Jr
WR	17	Cash Cross	So
TE	18	Shaun Grayson	Sr
RB	19	Jameer Muhammad	Fr
RB	26	Omarion Rasberry	Fr
RB	28	Damien Moore	GS
TE	37	Mason Thomas	So
TE	48	Aidan Grummer	So
OL	51	Alex Haralson	So
OL	58	Elias Ripley	GS
OL	60	John Hester	Jr
OL	61	Kade Verden	Jr
OL	62	Reagan Langston	Fr
OL	67	Marcus Harbert	Jr
OL	68	Reese Osei-Wusu	So
OL	69	Zachary Curtis	So
OL	70	Tyric Berg	So
OL	72	Endrei Sauls	So
OL	73	Kortez Winslow	So
OL	74	Knox Boyd	Sr
OL	78	Jude Locken	So
OL	79	Reggie Brooks	Sr
TE	83	Iyioluwa Adekoya	So
TE	84	C J DeMas	So
TE	87	Tyler Bonkowski	So
TE	88	Morgan Sampson	So

Defense

Pos.	#	Name	Class
DB	0	Paul Omodia	So
DB	1	Kristian Pugh	Sr
DB	2	Sean Connor	Jr
DL	3	Peyton Christian	Jr
DE	4	Royce Maloles	Jr
DB	6	Ronnie Hamrick	Sr
DB	8	Demarcus Rankin	Sr
DB	9	Jamarion Evans	So
DE	10	Kei'Trone Simpson	Jr
DB	11	Anthony White	Jr
DB	12	Zaylon Stoker	So
DB	13	Nicholas Brown	So
DE	14	Andrew Huff	Jr
LB	15	Koda Canady	Jr
DB	16	Jordan James	So
LB	17	Brayden Faulkner	Sr
LB	18	Nehemiah Borner	Fr
DB	19	Edward Gilds	Sr
LB	20	Dillon Dickson	So
DB	21	Mar'Shawn Richardson-Giddings	So
DB	22	Jaden Harding	Sr
DB	23	Tre Turner	So
DL	24	Javen Sanchez	GS
DB	25	Aidan White	Fr
LB	27	Robert Bonar	Sr
DB	29	Jarrett Mitchell	So
DB	31	Brenden Bradshaw	So
DB	32	Isaiah Menefee	Fr
DB	33	Derrick Kelly	Fr
LB	34	CJ Miller	So
LB	39	Etelridge McKinney	So
LB	41	Nick Rossomando	So
DE	42	Jacob Ferree	Jr
LB	44	Oliver Jack	Sr
LB	46	Issac Blessing	So
DB	47	Javon Rhodes	So
DL	50	Iyiola Oluwa Solomi	So
LB	52	Jackson Bandy	So
LB	53	Daiki Yoshikawa	So
DL	56	Tyler Edwards	Fr
DE	59	Danzel Chukweumeka	Jr
LB	82	Zion Carter	So
DL	90	Grayden Spencer	So
DL	91	Alex Sumler	So
DL	92	Colin Hedges	Jr
DL	93	Daniel Obinna-Kanu	So
DL	95	Alexandre Dedieu	Sr
DL	97	Christian Booker	Sr
DL	98	Will Hatter	Jr

Special teams

Pos.	#	Name	Class
K/P	65	Mason Stallons	Fr
P/K	66	Andres Sandoval	Fr
K/P	94	Ben Woodard	Sr
DS	99	Jacob Hefner	Fr

Head coach

Pete Rossomando

Coordinators/assistant coaches

- Drew Christ, def coord
- Ryan McCarthy, off coord and QBs
- Daryl Daleen, co-special teams coordinator and ILBs
- Wayne Cordova, Safeties
- Lorenzo Jackson, DLs
- Matt Cannata, OL
- Todd Macon, running backs
- Andrew Sparano, tight ends
- Morgan Ford, outside linebackers
- Pat Walker, strength
- Kenneth Trezvant, graduate assistant – offensive line
- Khiyree Keith, graduate assistant – defensive backs
- Semaj Mitchell, graduate assistant – wide receivers
- Carson Picheco, graduate assistant – defensive line
- Mikal Johnson, graduate assistant – special teams & specialists

Legend

- (C) Team captain
- (S) Suspended
- (I) Ineligible
- Injured
- Redshirt

Roster
Last update: April 19, 2025

== Rankings ==
Ranking movements Legend: ██ Increase in ranking ██ Decrease in ranking — = Not ranked RV = Received votes
	Week														
Poll	Pre	1	2	3	4	5	6	7	8	9	10	11	12	13	Final
STATS FCS	—	—	—	24	22	20	20	17	15	14	20	19	19	25	24
Coaches	RV	—	RV	RV	RV	25	24	18	15	14	18	14	19	24	21
