= 2025 Northwestern State Demons football team =

American college football season

2025 Northwestern State Demons football
- Conference: Southland Conference
- Record: 1–11 (0–8 SLC)
- Head coach: Blaine McCorkle (2nd season)
- Offensive coordinator: Carson Stewart (1st season)
- Offensive scheme: Spread
- Defensive coordinator: Matt Conner (2nd season)
- Base defense: 3–4
- Home stadium: Harry Turpin Stadium

2025 Southland Conference football standings
	Conf.			Overall
Team	W		L	W		L
No. 7 Stephen F. Austin $^	8	–	0	11	–	3
No. 19 Southeastern Louisiana ^	7	–	1	9	–	4
No. 24 Lamar ^	5	–	3	8	–	5
UT Rio Grande Valley	5	–	3	9	–	3
Nicholls	4	–	4	4	–	8
McNeese	4	–	4	5	–	7
East Texas A&M	3	–	5	3	–	9
Incarnate Word	3	–	5	5	–	7
Houston Christian	1	–	7	2	–	10
Northwestern State	0	–	8	1	–	11
$ – Conference champion; ^ – FCS playoff participant; Rankings from STATS Poll

The 2025 Northwestern State Demons football team represented Northwestern State University as a member of the Southland Conference during the 2025 NCAA Division I FCS football season. Led by second-year head coach Blaine McCorkle, the Demons played their home games at Harry Turpin Stadium in Natchitoches, Louisiana.

== Schedule ==
Date	Time	Opponent	Site	TV	Result	Attendance
August 28	7:00 p.m.	Alcorn State*	Harry Turpin Stadium; Natchitoches, LA	ESPN+	W 20–10	9,434
September 6	11:00 a.m.	at Minnesota*	Huntington Bank Stadium; Minneapolis, MN	BTN	L 0–66	42,447
September 13	2:30 p.m.	at Cincinnati*	Nippert Stadium; Cincinnati, OH	ESPN+	L 0–70	30,014
September 20	6:00 p.m.	at Prairie View A&M*	Panther Stadium at Blackshear Field; Prairie View, TX	SWAC TV	L 24–27	4,559
October 4	6:00 p.m.	East Texas A&M^{†}	Harry Turpin Stadium; Natchitoches, LA	ESPN+	L 10–40	11,262
October 11	6:00 p.m.	at Houston Christian	Husky Stadium; Houston, TX	ESPN+	L 17–20	1,645
October 18	4:00 p.m.	at Southeastern Louisiana	Strawberry Stadium; Hammond, LA (rivalry)	ESPN+	L 0–49	6,112
October 25	4:00 p.m.	No. 15 Lamar	Harry Turpin Stadium; Natchitoches, LA	ESPN+	L 14–41	8,761
November 1	6:00 p.m.	at McNeese	Cowboy Stadium; Lake Charles, LA (rivalry)	ESPN+	L 3–50	10,044
November 8	1:00 p.m.	Incarnate Word	Harry Turpin Stadium; Natchitoches, LA	ESPN+	L 3–38	4,243
November 15	3:00 p.m.	at Nicholls	Manning Field at John L. Guidry Stadium; Thibodaux, LA (NSU Challenge)	ESPN+	L 21–26	7,046
November 20	6:30 p.m.	No. 14 Stephen F. Austin	Harry Turpin Stadium; Natchitoches, LA (Chief Caddo)	ESPN+	L 14–62	4,285
*Non-conference game; ^{†}Homecoming; Rankings from STATS Poll released prior to the game; All times are in Central time

== Game summaries ==
=== Alcorn State ===
Alcorn State Braves (0–0) at Northwestern State Demons (0–0) – Game summary

Quarter	1	2	3	4	Total
Braves	0	0	10	0	10
Demons	13	0	0	7	20

at Harry Turpin Stadium, Natchitoches, Louisiana

- Date: August 28
- Game time: 7:00 PM CDT
- Game attendance: 9,434
- Referee: Gil Rora
- TV announcers (ESPN+): Patrick Netherton (play-by-play), Gary Reasons (analyst) and Jason Pugh (sideline)

Game information

First quarter

- NWST – Ty Moore 15-yard pass from Abram Johnston (Grayson Lytton kick BLOCKED), 13:53. Demons 6–0. Drive: 3 plays, 66 yards, 1:07.
- NWST – Ty Moore 8-yard punt return (Grayson Lytton kick), 7:44. Demons 13–0.

Second quarter

No scoring plays.

Third quarter

- ALCN – Orlandus McLaurin 72-yard interception return (Grandin Willcox kick), 2:25. Demons 13–7.
- ALCN – Grandin Willcox 51-yard field goal, 0:34. Demons 13–10. Drive: 4 plays, -8 yards, 0:56.

Fourth quarter

- NWST – Ryan Tyler 1-yard run (Grayson Lytton kick), 9:06. Demons 20–10. Drive: 12 plays, 68 yards, 6:17.

Statistics	ALCN	NWST
First downs	18	12
Total yards	301	270
Rushing yards	119	185
Passing yards	182	85
Turnovers	3	2
Time of possession	30:03	29:57

Team	Category	Player	Statistics
Alcorn State	Passing	Jaylon Tolbert	19/44, 182 yards, 2 INT
Alcorn State	Rushing	Reggie Davis	15 carries, 65 yards
Alcorn State	Receiving	Elijah Griffin	2 receptions, 58 yards
Northwestern State	Passing	Abram Johnston	9/18, 85 yards, TD, INT
Northwestern State	Rushing	Abram Johnston	17 carries, 69 yards
Northwestern State	Receiving	Kody Finley	1 reception, 26 yards

=== at Minnesota (FBS) ===
Northwestern State Demons (1–0) at Minnesota Golden Gophers (FBS) (1–0) – Game summary

Quarter	1	2	3	4	Total
Demons	0	0	0	0	0
Golden Gophers (FBS)	35	24	7	0	66

at Huntington Bank Stadium • Minneapolis, Minnesota

- Date: September 6
- Game time: 11:00 a.m.
- Game weather:
- Game attendance: 42,447
- Referee: Gregory Blum
- TV announcers (BTN): Jason Ross Jr. (play-by-play), Tanner Morgan (analyst) and Emma Carpenter (sideline)

Game information

First quarter

- MINN – John Nestor 29-yard interception return (Brady Denaburg kick), 14:54. Golden Gophers 7–0.
- MINN – A.J. Turner 1-yard run (Brady Denaburg kick), 9:33. Golden Gophers 14–0. Drive: 7 plays, 50 yards, 3:40.
- MINN – Le'Meke Brockington 7-yard run (Brady Denaburg kick), 5:32. Golden Gophers 21–0. Drive: 7 plays, 44 yards, 3:00.
- MINN – Drake Lindsey 1-yard run (Brady Denaburg kick), 1:07. Golden Gophers 28–0. Drive: 4 plays, 41 yards, 2:05.
- MINN – Matt Kingsbury 25-yard fumble return (Brady Denaburg kick), 0:27. Golden Gophers 35–0.

Second quarter

- MINN – Javon Tracy 45-yard pass from Drake Lindsey (Brady Denaburg kick), 12:20. Golden Gophers 42–0. Drive: 4 plays, 67 yards, 1:45.
- MINN – Cam Davis 7-yard run (Brady Denaburg kick), 10:43. Golden Gophers 49–0. Drive: 4 plays, 31 yards, 1:24.
- MINN – Fame Ijeboi 22-yard pass from Max Shikenjanski (Daniel Jackson kick), 5:40. Golden Gophers 56–0. Drive: 5 plays, 48 yards, 2:48.
- MINN – Brady Denaburg 27-yard field goal, 2:38. Golden Gophers 59–0. Drive: 4 plays, -3 yards, 2:03.

Third quarter

- MINN – Max Shikenjanski 8-yard run (Daniel Jackson kick), 11:47. Golden Gophers 66–0. Drive: 6 plays, 75 yards, 3:13.

Fourth quarter

- No scoring plays.

Statistics	NWST	MINN
First downs	2	25
Plays–yards	37–42	63–484
Rushes–yards	22–19	46–258
Passing yards	23	226
Passing: comp–att–int	9–15–2	13–17–1
Turnovers	4	1
Time of possession	20:32	33:13

Team	Category	Player	Statistics
Northwestern State	Passing	Eli Anderson	3/4, 13 yards
Northwestern State	Rushing	Jeremiah James	3 carries, 8 yards
Northwestern State	Receiving	Myion Hicks	2 receptions, 10 yards
Minnesota	Passing	Drake Lindsey	8/9, 139 yards, TD
Minnesota	Rushing	Grant Washington	20 carries, 126 yards
Minnesota	Receiving	Kenric Lanier II	2 receptions, 59 yards

=== at Cincinnati (FBS) ===
Northwestern State Demons (1–1) at Cincinnati Bearcats (FBS) (1–1) – Game summary

Quarter	1	2	3	4	Total
Demons	0	0	0	0	0
Bearcats (FBS)	35	21	7	7	70

at Nippert Stadium, Cincinnati, Ohio

- Date: September 13
- Game time: 3:30 PM EDT
- Game weather: Sunny • Temperature: 85 °F (29 °C) • Wind: W 7 mph
- Game attendance: 30,014
- Referee: Henry Johns
- TV announcers (ESPN+): Shawn Kenney (play-by-play) and Jeff Woody (analyst)

Game information

First quarter

- (13:24) CIN – Joe Royer 21-yard pass from Brendan Sorsby, Stephen Rusnak kick (Drive: 4 plays, 65 yards, 1:36; Cincinnati 7–0)
- (11:18) CIN – Caleb Goodie 55-yard pass from Brendan Sorsby, Stephen Rusnak kick (Drive: 1 play, 55 yards, 0:09; Cincinnati 14–0)
- (7:07) CIN – Tawee Walker 10-yard pass from Brendan Sorsby, Stephen Rusnak kick (Drive: 4 plays, 42 yards, 1:43; Cincinnati 21–0)
- (4:11) CIN – Joe Royer 2-yard pass from Brendan Sorsby, Stephen Rusnak kick (Drive: 3 plays, 45 yards, 1:14; Cincinnati 28–0)
- (2:46) CIN – Isaiah Johnson 8-yard pass from Brendan Sorsby, Stephen Rusnak kick (Drive: 2 plays, 30 yards, 0:30; Cincinnati 35–0)

Second quarter

- (9:40) CIN – Brendan Sorsby 23-yard run, Stephen Rusnak kick (Drive: 8 plays, 80 yards, 3:41; Cincinnati 42–0)
- (5:38) CIN – Tawee Walker 15-yard run, Stephen Rusnak kick (Drive: 6 plays, 67 yards, 2:26; Cincinnati 49–0)
- (0:16) CIN – Cyrus Allen 29-yard pass from Brady Lichtenberg, Stephen Rusnak kick (Drive: 3 plays, 53 yards, 0:43; Cincinnati 56–0)

Third quarter

- (4:14) CIN – Chance Williams 3-yard run, Dino Beslagic kick (Drive: 7 plays, 70 yards, 3:32; Cincinnati 63–0)

Fourth quarter

- (5:00) CIN – Isaiah Johnson 42-yard pass from Samaj Jones, Dino Beslagic kick (Drive: 5 plays, 69 yards, 2:45; Cincinnati 70–0)

Statistics	NWST	CIN
First downs	6	27
Plays–yards	51–102	49–605
Rushes–yards	35–68	26–243
Passing yards	34	362
Passing: comp–att–int	10–16–0	21–23–0
Turnovers	1	0
Time of possession	39:15	20:45

Team	Category	Player	Statistics
Northwestern State	Passing	Abram Johnston	7/11, 32 yards
Northwestern State	Rushing	Kolbe Burrell	12 carries, 31 yards
Northwestern State	Receiving	Luke Carter	1 reception, 11 yards
Cincinnati	Passing	Brendan Sorsby	15/15, 253 yards, 5 TD
Cincinnati	Rushing	Tawee Walker	6 carries, 66 yards, TD
Cincinnati	Receiving	Caleb Goodie	3 receptions, 106 yards, TD

=== at Prairie View A&M ===
Northwestern State Demons (1–2) at Prairie View A&M Panthers (1–2) – Game summary

Quarter	1	2	Total
Demons			0
Panthers			0

at Panther Stadium, Prairie View, Texas

- Date: September 20
- Game time: 6:00 p.m. CDT
- TV announcers (SWAC TV): Butch Alsandor (play-by-play) and Jorge Vargas (analyst)

Statistics	NWST	PV
First downs		
Plays–yards		
Rushes–yards		
Passing yards		
Turnovers		
Time of possession		

Team	Category	Player	Statistics
Northwestern State	Passing		
Northwestern State	Rushing		
Northwestern State	Receiving		
Prairie View A&M	Passing		
Prairie View A&M	Rushing		
Prairie View A&M	Receiving		

=== East Texas A&M ===
East Texas A&M Lions (0–4) at Northwestern State Demons (1–3) – Game summary

Quarter	1	2	3	4	Total
Lions	10	7	20	3	40
Demons	0	3	0	7	10

at Harry Turpin Stadium, Natchitoches, Louisiana

- Date: October 4
- Game time: 6:00 PM CDT
- Game weather: Sunny • Temperature: 84 °F (29 °C) • Wind: E at 8 miles per hour (13 km/h)
- Game attendance: 11,262
- Referee: Matt Beck
- TV announcers (ESPN+): Patrick Netherton (play-by-play), Gary Reasons (analyst) and Jason Pugh (sideline)

Game information

First Quarter

- (7:51) ETAM – EJ Oakmon 2-yard run, Ozlo Rigby kick (Drive: 9 plays, 77 yards, 4:44; East Texas A&M 7–0)
- (0:59) ETAM – Ozlo Rigby 39-yard field goal (Drive: 10 plays, 41 yards, 4:52; East Texas A&M 10–0)

Second Quarter

- (3:15) ETAM – EJ Oakmon 5-yard run, Ozlo Rigby kick (Drive: 14 plays, 80 yards, 6:30; East Texas A&M 17–0)
- (0:00) NWST – Cooper Evans 30-yard field goal (Drive: 10 plays, 81 yards, 1:48; East Texas A&M 17–3)

Third Quarter

- (11:40) ETAM – KJ Shankle 24-yard run (Drive: 6 plays, 91 yards, 3:14; East Texas A&M 23–3)
- (7:57) ETAM – Christian Jourdain 46-yard pass from Ron Peace, Ozlo Rigby kick (Drive: 4 plays, 67 yards, 1:44; East Texas A&M 30–3)
- (0:22) ETAM – EJ Oakmon 12-yard run, Ozlo Rigby kick (Drive: 8 plays, 65 yards, 3:44; East Texas A&M 37–3)

Fourth Quarter

- (9:25) NWST – Kolbe Burrell 4-yard run, Cooper Evans kick (Drive: 8 plays, 62 yards, 3:10; East Texas A&M 37–10)
- (4:52) ETAM – Ozlo Rigby 47-yard field goal (Drive: 10 plays, 45 yards, 4:33; East Texas A&M 40–10)

Statistics	ETAM	NWST
First downs	29	17
Total yards	532	190
Rushing yards	261	66
Passing yards	271	124
Turnovers	1	1
Time of possession	37:15	22:45

Team	Category	Player	Statistics
East Texas A&M	Passing	Ron Peace	14/19, 268 yards, TD, INT
East Texas A&M	Rushing	KJ Shankle	11 carries, 93 yards, TD
East Texas A&M	Receiving	Devin Matthews	4 receptions, 109 yards
Northwestern State	Passing	Abram Johnston	13/27, 124 yards, INT
Northwestern State	Rushing	Kolbe Burrell	5 carries, 26 yards, TD
Northwestern State	Receiving	Amaaz Eugene	2 receptions, 42 yards

=== at Houston Christian ===
Northwestern State Demons (1–4) at Houston Christian Huskies (1–4) – Game summary

Quarter	1	2	3	4	Total
Demons	7	3	0	7	17
Huskies	7	6	7	0	20

at Husky Stadium, Houston, Texas

- Date: October 11
- Game time: 6:00 PM CDT
- TV: ESPN+

Statistics	NWST	HCU
First downs		
Plays–yards		
Rushes–yards		
Passing yards		
Turnovers		
Time of possession		

Team	Category	Player	Statistics
Northwestern State	Passing		
Northwestern State	Rushing		
Northwestern State	Receiving		
Houston Christian	Passing		
Houston Christian	Rushing		
Houston Christian	Receiving		

=== at Southeastern Louisiana ===
Northwestern State Demons (1–5) at Southeastern Louisiana Lions (4–2) – Game summary

Quarter	1	2	Total
Demons			0
Lions			0

at Strawberry Stadium, Hammond, Louisiana

- Date: October 18
- Game time: 4:00 PM CDT
- TV: ESPN+

Statistics	NWST	SELA
First downs		
Plays–yards		
Rushes–yards		
Passing yards		
Turnovers		
Time of possession		

Team	Category	Player	Statistics
Northwestern State	Passing		
Northwestern State	Rushing		
Northwestern State	Receiving		
Southeastern Louisiana	Passing		
Southeastern Louisiana	Rushing		
Southeastern Louisiana	Receiving		

=== No. 15 Lamar ===
No. 15 Lamar Cardinals (6–1) at Northwestern State Demons (1–6) – Game summary

Quarter	1	2	Total
No. 15 Cardinals			0
Demons			0

at Harry Turpin Stadium, Natchitoches, Louisiana

- Date: October 25
- Game time: 4:00 PM CDT
- TV: ESPN+

Statistics	LAM	NWST
First downs		
Total yards		
Rushing yards		
Passing yards		
Turnovers		
Time of possession		

Team	Category	Player	Statistics
Lamar	Passing		
Lamar	Rushing		
Lamar	Receiving		
Northwestern State	Passing		
Northwestern State	Rushing		
Northwestern State	Receiving		

=== at McNeese ===
Northwestern State Demons (1–7) at McNeese Cowboys (2–6) – Game summary

Quarter	1	2	Total
Demons			0
Cowboys			0

at Cowboy Stadium, Lake Charles, Louisiana

- Date: November 1
- Game time: 6:00 PM CDT
- TV: ESPN+

Statistics	NWST	MCN
First downs		
Total yards		
Rushing yards		
Passing yards		
Turnovers		
Time of possession		

Team	Category	Player	Statistics
Northwestern State	Passing		
Northwestern State	Rushing		
Northwestern State	Receiving		
McNeese	Passing		
McNeese	Rushing		
McNeese	Receiving		

=== Incarnate Word ===
Incarnate Word Cardinals (3–6) at Northwestern State Demons (1–8) – Game summary

Quarter	1	2	Total
Cardinals			0
Demons			0

at Harry Turpin Stadium, Natchitoches, Louisiana

- Date: November 8
- Game time: 1:00 PM CST
- TV: ESPN+

Statistics	UIW	NWST
First downs		
Total yards		
Rushing yards		
Passing yards		
Turnovers		
Time of possession		

Team	Category	Player	Statistics
Incarnate Word	Passing		
Incarnate Word	Rushing		
Incarnate Word	Receiving		
Northwestern State	Passing		
Northwestern State	Rushing		
Northwestern State	Receiving		

=== at Nicholls ===
Northwestern State Demons at Nicholls Colonels – Game summary

Quarter	1	2	Total
Demons			0
Colonels			0

at Manning Field at John L. Guidry Stadium, Thibodaux, Louisiana

- Date: November 15
- TV: ESPN+

Statistics	NWST	NICH
First downs		
Total yards		
Rushing yards		
Passing yards		
Turnovers		
Time of possession		

Team	Category	Player	Statistics
Northwestern State	Passing		
Northwestern State	Rushing		
Northwestern State	Receiving		
Nicholls	Passing		
Nicholls	Rushing		
Nicholls	Receiving		

=== No. 14 Stephen F. Austin ===
No. 14 Stephen F. Austin Lumberjacks (9–2) at Northwestern State Demons (1–10) – Game summary

Quarter	1	2	3	4	Total
No. 14 Lumberjacks	20	28	7	7	62
Demons	0	0	7	7	14

at Harry Turpin Stadium, Natchitoches, Louisiana

- Date: November 20
- Game time: 6:30 PM CST
- Game weather: Sunny, 74 °F (23 °C)
- Game attendance: 4,285
- Referee: Craig Helser
- TV announcers (ESPN+): Patrick Netherton (play-by-play), Gary Reasons (analyst) and Jason Pugh (sideline)
- Box score, Recap

Game information
First quarter
- SFA – Bugs Mortimer 79-yard punt return (Carlos Alvarado kick), 13:21. Lumberjacks 7–0.
- SFA – Derrick Bohler 26-yard pass from Sam Vidlak (run failed), 8:16. Lumberjacks 13–0. Drive: 5 plays, 59 yards, 1:41.
- SFA – Kylon Harris 65-yard pass from Sam Vidlak (Carlos Alvarado kick), 4:40. Lumberjacks 20–0. Drive: 3 plays, 75 yards, 0:56.

Second quarter

- SFA – Isaiah Davis 10-yard pass from Sam Vidlak (Carlos Alvarado kick), 13:49. Lumberjacks 27–0. Drive: 7 plays, 80 yards, 2:39.
- SFA – Jaylen Jenkins 18-yard run (Carlos Alvarado kick), 10:14. Lumberjacks 34–0. Drive: 4 plays, 68 yards, 1:06.
- SFA – Jaylen Jenkins 2-yard run (Carlos Alvarado kick), 5:03. Lumberjacks 41–0. Drive: 9 plays, 67 yards, 2:59.
- SFA – Richard Reese 9-yard run (Carlos Alvarado kick), 2:17. Lumberjacks 48–0. Drive: 3 plays, 54 yards, 1:07.

Third quarter

- SFA – Derrick Bohler 13-yard pass from Bryson Broadway (Carlos Alvarado kick), 7:20. Lumberjacks 55–0. Drive: 9 plays, 76 yards, 3:38.
- NWST – Camryn Davis 8-yard pass from Eli Anderson (Grayson Lytton kick), 2:55. Lumberjacks 55–7. Drive: 8 plays, 75 yards, 4:25.

Fourth quarter

- SFA – Jaylen Jenkins 1-yard run (Carlos Alvarado kick), 10:13. Lumberjacks 62–7. Drive: 15 plays, 75 yards, 7:42.
- NWST – Ty Moore 5-yard pass from Eli Anderson (Grayson Lytton kick), 4:25. Lumberjacks 62–14. Drive: 11 plays, 81 yards, 5:43.

Statistics	SFA	NWST
First downs	34	17
Plays–yards	64–607	64–307
Rushes–yards	42–320	41–146
Passing yards	287	161
Turnovers	0	0
Time of possession	26:09	33:51

Team	Category	Player	Statistics
Stephen F. Austin	Passing	Sam Vidlak	9/10, 207 yards, 3 TD
Stephen F. Austin	Rushing	Richard Reese	14 rushes, 115 yards, TD
Stephen F. Austin	Receiving	Kylon Harris	4 receptions, 135 yards, TD
Northwestern State	Passing	Eli Anderson	11/16, 150 yards, 2 TD
Northwestern State	Rushing	Jeremiah James	10 rushes, 68 yards
Northwestern State	Receiving	Brendan Webb	2 receptions, 38 yards

== Personnel ==
2025 Northwestern State Demons football team roster
Players
Coaches
Offense

Pos.	#	Name	Class
RB	0	Myion Hicks	Sr
WR	1	Dylan Rhodes	So
RB	3	Kolbe Burrell	GS
WR	5	Amaaz Eugene	So
WR	6	Ty Moore	GS
RB	7	Zay Davis	Sr
TE	8	Luke Carter	Fr
WR	9	Camryn Davis	Fr
QB	10	Abram Johnston	Fr
WR	11	Dane Wallace	GS
TE	13	Joseph Moreland	So
QB	14	Eli Anderson	Sr
QB	15	Ben Taylor	Fr
RB	16	Kyron Angeletti	So
QB	17	Nico Victorian	Fr
WR	18	Kody Finley	Jr
QB	19	Garrett Graves	Fr
RB	20	Trevor Allen Jr.	Fr
RB	24	Brian Banks	So
RB	25	Jeremiah James	Fr
RB	27	Ian Vigo	Fr
FB	29	Liam Cohen	So
WR	30	Brock Comeaux	Fr
WR	32	Ben Buisson	Fr
FB	42	Matthew Broad	Sr
WR	45	Jackson Hedrick	Fr
TE	47	Ryan Tyler	Sr
OL	50	Caleb Billiot	Sr
OL	55	Isaiah Ybarra	Jr
C	56	Sam Nations	Fr
OL	58	Rory Lambert	Fr
OL	60	Christian Thibodaux	Fr
OL	62	Eli Little	Fr
OL	63	Landon Vallee	Fr
OL	65	Chris Allen	So
OL	66	Christian Menard	Fr
OL	69	Nicholas Soileau	Jr
OL	70	Lawson Champagne	Fr
OL	71	Logan Brady	Fr
OL	73	Garrett Morphis	So
OL	74	Ryan Larson	So
OL	75	Ralee Jackson	Fr
OL	77	Guadalupe Cedillo	Sr
OL	78	Keegan Moten	Fr
WR	82	Andrew Fields	Fr
TE	83	George "Tyler" Siddons	Jr
WR	84	Jimmie Duncan	Fr
WR	85	Brendan Webb	Fr
WR	86	Jackson Chiasson	Fr
TE	87	Jojo Fagin	Fr
TE	88	Matt Gower	Fr

Defense

Pos.	#	Name	Class
LB	0	Cam George	Sr
S	1	Christian Williams	Sr
CB	2	Antonio Hall	So
CB	3	Caesar Magee III	GS
CB	5	Rahmaan Rinkin	Jr
S	6	Kaden Mackey	Fr
DE	7	Jeremiah Bodwin	GS
S	8	Gylen Ford	Fr
LB	9	Danny Sears	Jr
LB	10	Fernando Washington	Jr
LB	11	Nehemiah Barrett	Fr
S	14	Je'Careon Lathan	Sr
LB	15	Barrett Newman	So
LB	16	Kolbe Cage	Sr
CB	18	Tyler Welch	Fr
CB	19	Brennon Thompson	Fr
S	20	Jeremiah Keppard	So
CB	21	Ja'Marion Bonner	So
LB	23	Jackson King	Fr
LB	25	KB Anderson-Dale	Fr
S	28	Jacob Miranda	Fr
CB	30	Troy Santa Marina Jr.	So
LB	33	Landry Huddleston	Sr
CB	38	Jason Blackwell II	Fr
DL	39	Ford Clark	Fr
S	40	Brian "BJ" Young	So
DE	42	Braden Woods	Fr
LB	45	Ben Bienvenu	So
LB	46	Jayden Cook	Fr
S	48	Joe Natali	Fr
LB	49	Jadon Weber	Fr
DL	51	Chad Gooden Jr.	Jr
LB	52	Andre Williams	Fr
DE	54	Kemarion Ivory	So
DL	90	Tyler Lewis	Sr
DL	91	Elijah Sims	Jr
DL	92	Sanplice Simien	Fr
DL	93	Quintin Cook	Jr
DL	94	Preston Hickey	Jr
DL	96	Javian Council	Fr
DL	97	Darius Servick	Fr
DT	99	Ke'shawn Reed	So

Special teams

Pos.	#	Name	Class
K	17	Cooper Evans	Fr
LS	57	Colby Carranza	Jr
LS	67	Jack Devens	So
P	81	Zack Stone	Jr
K	89	Grayson Lytton	Fr
K	90	Ben Jump	Fr

Head coach

- Blaine McCorkle

Coordinators/assistant coaches

- Norman Joseph
  Quarterbacks
- Matt Conner
  Defensive coordinator
- Carson Stewart
  Offensive coordinator
- Tyson Wachenheim
  Special teams coordinator
- Justin Williamson
  Linebackers/Recruiting coordinator
- Isaac Bails
  Defensive line
- Cade Camp
  Offensive line
- Tylan Martin
  Running backs
- Maurice Stewart
  Wide receivers
- Kendrick Van Ackeren
  Defensive backs
- Kendrioun Boatman
  Offensive line graduate assistant
- Tyrius "TJ" Hersey
  Defensive backs graduate assistant
- Darrin Peterson Jr.
  Tight ends and fullbacks graduate assistant
- Andrew Norton
  Equipment manager

Legend

- (C) Team captain
- (S) Suspended
- (I) Ineligible
- Injured
- Redshirt

Roster
Last update: August 8, 2025
