= 2025 East Texas A&M Lions football team =

American college football season

2025 East Texas A&M Lions football
- Conference: Southland Conference
- Record: 3–9 (3–5 SLC)
- Head coach: Clint Dolezel (3rd season)
- Offensive scheme: Spread
- Defensive coordinator: Jack Tyler (2nd season)
- Base defense: 4–2–5
- Home stadium: Ernest Hawkins Field at Memorial Stadium

2025 Southland Conference football standings
	Conf.			Overall
Team	W		L	W		L
No. 7 Stephen F. Austin $^	8	–	0	11	–	3
No. 19 Southeastern Louisiana ^	7	–	1	9	–	4
No. 24 Lamar ^	5	–	3	8	–	5
UT Rio Grande Valley	5	–	3	9	–	3
Nicholls	4	–	4	4	–	8
McNeese	4	–	4	5	–	7
East Texas A&M	3	–	5	3	–	9
Incarnate Word	3	–	5	5	–	7
Houston Christian	1	–	7	2	–	10
Northwestern State	0	–	8	1	–	11
$ – Conference champion; ^ – FCS playoff participant; Rankings from STATS Poll

The 2025 East Texas A&M Lions football team represented East Texas A&M University as a member of the Southland Conference during the 2025 NCAA Division I FCS football season. The Lions were led by third-year head coach Clint Dolezel and played their home games at Ernest Hawkins Field at Memorial Stadium in Commerce, Texas.

This season was the Lions' first season as a full Division I member, after the NCAA approved East Texas A&M's request to be granted full status one year early on June 23. Thus, the Lions are now eligible for the postseason. It is also ETAMU's first full season under its current name; the university started the 2024 season as Texas A&M University–Commerce before officially changing its name on November 7, 2024.

== Schedule ==
Date	Time	Opponent	Site	TV	Result	Attendance
August 30	8:00 p.m.	at No. 16 (FBS) SMU*	Gerald J. Ford Stadium; University Park, TX	ACCN	L 13–42	33,044
September 6	11:00 a.m.	at No. 14 (FBS) Florida State*	Doak S. Campbell Stadium; Tallahassee, FL	ACCN	L 3–77	65,430
September 20	6:00 p.m.	at Grambling State*	Eddie G. Robinson Memorial Stadium; Grambling, LA	SWAC TV	L 28–31	4,210
September 27	6:00 p.m.	North Carolina Central*	Ernest Hawkins Field at Memorial Stadium; Commerce, TX	ESPN+	L 42–50	3,284
October 4	6:00 pm	at Northwestern State	Harry Turpin Stadium; Natchitoches, LA	ESPN+	W 40–10	11,262
October 11	6:00 p.m.	No. 20 Lamar	Ernest Hawkins Field at Memorial Stadium; Commerce, TX	ESPN+	L 23–33	2,713
October 18	4:30 pm	at Incarnate Word	Gayle and Tom Benson Stadium; San Antonio, TX	ESPN+	W 52–45	2,016
October 25	6:00 p.m.	No. 24 Stephen F. Austin^{†}	Ernest Hawkins Field at Memorial Stadium; Commerce, TX	ESPN+	L 21–31	3,141
November 1	6:00 p.m.	at No. 21 Southeastern Louisiana	Strawberry Stadium; Hammond, LA	ESPN+	L 14–59	4,121
November 8	4:00 p.m.	McNeese	Ernest Hawkins Field at Memorial Stadium; Commerce, TX	ESPN+	L 20–35	2,534
November 15	4:00 p.m.	Houston Christian	Ernest Hawkins Field at Memorial Stadium; Commerce, TX	ESPN+	W 37–32	2,923
November 22	5:00 p.m.	at UT Rio Grande Valley	Robert and Janet Vackar Stadium; Edinburg, TX	ESPN+	L 14–33	12,320
*Non-conference game; ^{†}Homecoming; Rankings from STATS Poll released prior to the game; All times are in Central time

== Game summaries ==
=== At No. 16 (FBS) SMU ===
East Texas A&M Lions (0–0) at No. 16 (FBS) SMU Mustangs (0–0) – Game summary

Quarter	1	2	3	4	Total
Lions	0	3	0	10	13
No. 16 (FBS) Mustangs	14	7	7	14	42

at Gerald J. Ford Stadium, University Park, Texas

- Date: August 30
- Game time: 8:00 p.m. CDT
- Game weather: Sunny, 72 °F (22 °C)
- Game attendance: 33,044
- Referee: Jon Noli
- TV announcers (ACCN): Wes Durham, Steve Addazio, and Dana Boyle
- Box score, Recap

Game information

First quarter

- SMU – Romello Brinson 63-yard pass from Kevin Jennings (Collin Rogers kick), 14:07. Mustangs 7–0. Drive: 3 plays, 75 yards, 0:53.
- SMU – Alexander Kilgore 10-yard interception return (Collin Rogers kick), 5:32. Mustangs 14–0.

Second quarter

- SMU – Chris Johnson Jr. 22-yard run (Collin Rogers kick), 14:12. Mustangs 21–0. Drive: 6 plays, 80 yards, 2:01.
- ETAM – Ozlo Rigby 29-yard field goal, 5:20. Mustangs 21–3. Drive: 8 plays, 68 yards, 3:39.

Third quarter

- SMU – Ahmaad Moses 95-yard interception return (Collin Rogers kick), 9:32. Mustangs 28–3.

Fourth quarter

- SMU – Kevin Jennings 7-yard run (Collin Rogers kick), 14:12. Mustangs 35–3. Drive: 13 plays, 81 yards, 4:21.
- SMU – Jalen Cooper 38-yard pass from Kevin Jennings (Collin Rogers kick), 9:34. Mustangs 42–3. Drive: 3 plays, 47 yards, 0:44.
- ETAM – Eric Rodriguez 1-yard run (Ozlo Rigby kick), 2:55. Mustangs 42–10. Drive: 13 plays, 80 yards, 6:34.
- ETAM – Ozlo Rigby 32-yard field goal, 0:00. Mustangs 42–13. Drive: 8 plays, 31 yards, 1:54.

Statistics	ETAM	SMU
First downs	17	25
Total yards	78–351	63–400
Rushing yards	35–107	33–140
Passing yards	244	260
Passing: comp–att–int	20–43–2	22–30–1
Turnovers	3	3
Time of possession	38:59	21:01

Team	Category	Player	Statistics
East Texas A&M	Passing	Eric Rodriguez	14/30, 191 yards, INT
East Texas A&M	Rushing	JaiSean McMillian	4 carries, 31 yards
East Texas A&M	Receiving	Devin Matthews	4 receptions, 87 yards
SMU	Passing	Kevin Jennings	22/30, 260 yards, 2 TD, INT
SMU	Rushing	Chris Johnson Jr.	6 carries, 44 yards, TD
SMU	Receiving	Romello Brinson	7 receptions, 121 yards, TD

=== At No. 14 (FBS) Florida State ===
East Texas A&M Lions (0–1) at No. 14 (FBS) Florida State Seminoles (1–0) – Game summary

Quarter	1	2	3	4	Total
Lions	0	0	0	3	3
No. 14 (FBS) Seminoles	21	28	21	7	77

at Doak Campbell Stadium • Tallahassee, Florida

- Date: September 6
- Game time: 12:00 p.m.
- Game weather: Sunny • Temperature: 86 °F (30 °C) • Wind: E at 5 miles per hour (8.0 km/h)
- Game attendance: 65,430
- Referee: Darryl DeBerry
- TV announcers (ACCN): Jorge Sedano (play-by-play), Rodney McLeod (analyst), and Victoria Arlen (sideline reporter)
- Box score, Recap

Game information

First quarter

- (8:14) FSU – Gavin Sawchuk 1-yard run, Jake Weinberg kick (Drive: 12 plays, 78 yards, 4:38; Florida State 7–0)
- (4:48) FSU – Duce Robinson 82-yard pass from Tommy Castellanos, Jake Weinberg kick (Drive: 1 play, 82 yards, 0:11; Florida State 14–0)
- (2:18) FSU – Duce Robinson 42-yard pass from Tommy Castellanos, Jake Weinberg kick (Drive: 4 plays, 53 yards, 0:52; Florida State 21–0)

Second quarter

- (14:57) FSU – Gavin Sawchuk 1-yard run, Jake Weinberg kick (Drive: 6 plays, 15 yards, 2:04; Florida State 28–0)
- (11:37) FSU – Gavin Sawchuk 53-yard pass from Tommy Castellanos, Jake Weinberg kick (Drive: 4 plays, 61 yards, 1:09; Florida State 35–0)
- (7:21) FSU – Micahi Danzy 53-yard run, Jake Weinberg kick (Drive: 4 plays, 72 yards, 1:33; Florida State 42–0)
- (0:48) FSU – Jayvan Boggs 3-yard pass from Kevin Sperry, Jake Weinberg kick (Drive: 10 plays, 65 yards, 5:10; Florida State 49–0)

Third quarter

- (12:06) FSU – Amaree Williams 35-yard pass from Brock Glenn, Jake Weinberg kick (Drive: 6 plays, 76 yards, 2:47; Florida State 56–0)
- (8:57) FSU – Ousmane Kromah 43-yard pass from Kevin Sperry, Jake Weinberg kick (Drive: 3 plays, 48 yards, 1:15; Florida State 63–0)
- (2:13) FSU – Samuel Singleton Jr. 53-yard run, Jake Weinberg kick (Drive: 4 plays, 98 yards, 2:13; Florida State 70–0)

Fourth quarter

- (9:30) ETAM – Ozlo Rigby 21-yard field goal (Drive: 7 plays, 49 yards, 3:29; Florida State 70–3)
- (1:54) FSU – Zay Parks 13-yard run, Brunno Reus kick (Drive: 12 plays, 80 yards, 7:32; Florida State 77–3)

Statistics	ETAM	FSU
First downs	9	29
Plays–yards	49–197	71–729
Rushes–yards	35–105	51–361
Passing yards	92	368
Passing: comp–att–int	7–13–2	16–20–0
Turnovers	2	1
Time of possession	28:01	31:59

Team	Category	Player	Statistics
East Texas A&M	Passing	Jack Jacobs	2/3, 43 yards
East Texas A&M	Rushing	KJ Shankle	8 carries, 26 yards
East Texas A&M	Receiving	Christian Jourdain	3 receptions, 28 yards
Florida State	Passing	Tommy Castellanos	8/11, 237 yards, 3 TD
Florida State	Rushing	Samuel Singleton, Jr.	4 carries, 82 yards, TD
Florida State	Receiving	Duce Robinson	5 receptions, 173 yards, 2 TD

=== At Grambling State ===
East Texas A&M Lions (0–2) at Grambling State Tigers (2–1) – Game summary

Quarter	1	2	3	4	Total
Lions	0	14	7	7	28
Tigers	0	7	14	10	31

at Eddie G. Robinson Memorial Stadium, Grambling, Louisiana

- Date: September 20
- Game time: 6:00 p.m.
- Game weather: Sunny • Temperature: 86 °F (30 °C) • Wind: S at 5 miles per hour (8.0 km/h)
- Game attendance: 4,210
- Referee: Charles Green
- TV: SWAC TV
- Box score, Recap

Game information

First Quarter

No scoring plays

Second Quarter

- (6:12) ETAM – EJ Oakmon 7-yard run, Ozlo Rigby kick (Drive: 9 plays, 78 yards, 4:24; East Texas A&M 7–0)
- (2:25) ETAM – Brycen Davis 3-yard pass from Eric Rodriguez, Ozlo Rigby kick (Drive: 6 plays, 27 yards, 2:48; East Texas A&M 14–0)
- (0:59) GRAM – Covadis Knighten 11-yard pass from C'zavian Teasett, Theodore Caballero kick (Drive: 3 plays, 37 yards, 0:26; East Texas A&M 14–7)

Third Quarter

- (11:10) GRAM – C'zavian Teasett 1-yard run, Theodore Caballero kick (Drive: 4 plays, 1 yard, 1:42; Tied 14–14)
- (7:38) ETAM – Jaden Proctor 26-yard pass from Eric Rodriguez, Ozlo Rigby kick (Drive: 6 plays, 65 yards, 3:32; East Texas A&M 21–14)
- (5:50) GRAM – Byron Eaton Jr. 54-yard run, Theodore Caballero kick (Drive: 4 plays, 68 yards, 1:41; Tied 21–21)

Fourth Quarter

- (13:04) ETAM – JaiSean McMillian 6-yard run, Ozlo Rigby kick (Drive: 10 plays, 86 yards, 5:17; East Texas A&M 28–21)
- (10:54) GRAM – Theodore Caballero 41-yard field goal (Drive: 6 plays, 51 yards, 2:10; East Texas A&M 28–24)
- (1:56) GRAM – Clyde McClendon Jr. 1-yard run, Theodore Caballero kick (Drive: 12 plays, 77 yards, 6:01; Grambling State 31–28)

Statistics	ETAM	GRAM
First downs	23	15
Total yards	352	321
Rushing yards	123	142
Passing yards	229	179
Turnovers	1	0
Time of possession	36:29	23:31

Team	Category	Player	Statistics
East Texas A&M	Passing	Eric Rodriguez	23/33, 229 yards, 2 TD, INT
East Texas A&M	Rushing	KJ Shankle	13 carries, 51 yards
East Texas A&M	Receiving	Tyler Daniels	3 receptions, 51 yards
Grambling State	Passing	C'zavian Teasett	14/26, 179 yards, TD
Grambling State	Rushing	Byron Eaton Jr.	6 carries, 69 yards, TD
Grambling State	Receiving	Tyson George	3 receptions, 59 yards

=== North Carolina Central ===
North Carolina Central Eagles (3–2) at East Texas A&M Lions (0–3) – Game summary

Quarter	1	2	3	4	Total
Eagles	14	17	16	3	50
Lions	7	14	0	21	42

at Ernest Hawkins Field at Memorial Stadium, Commerce, Texas

- Date: September 27
- Game time: 6:00 p.m.
- Game weather: Sunny • Temperature: 86 °F (30 °C) • Wind: E at 6 miles per hour (9.7 km/h)
- Game attendance: 3,284
- Referee: Craig Helser
- TV announcers (ESPN+): Greg Higgins (play-by-play) and Adam Routon (analyst)
- Box score, Recap

Game information

First Quarter

- (14:24) ETAM – Tanner Harrison 73-yard pass from Ron Peace, Ozlo Rigby kick (Drive: 2 plays, 75 yards, 0:36; East Texas A&M 7–0)
- (10:42) NCCU – Chance Peterson 22-yard pass from Walker Harris, Kaleb Robinson kick (Drive: 8 plays, 78 yards, 3:36; Tied 7–7)
- (3:55) NCCU – Chauncey Spikes 32-yard pass from Walker Harris, Kaleb Robinson kick (Drive: 11 plays, 80 yards, 4:30; North Carolina Central 14–7)

Second Quarter

- (14:56) NCCU – Chris Mosley 3-yard run, Kaleb Robinson kick (Drive: 5 plays, 13 yards, 2:22; North Carolina Central 21–7)
- (11:30) ETAM – EJ Oakmon 3-yard run, Ozlo Rigby kick (Drive: 7 plays, 61 yards, 3:25; North Carolina Central 21–14)
- (6:22) NCCU – Arthur Rodgers 3-yard run, Kaleb Robinson kick (Drive: 9 plays, 75 yards, 5:08; North Carolina Central 28–14)
- (4:52) ETAM – Devin Matthews 59-yard pass from Ron Peace, Ozlo Rigby kick (Drive: 5 plays, 84 yards, 1:25; North Carolina Central 28–21)
- (0:17) NCCU – Kaleb Robinson 20-yard field goal (Drive: 6 plays, 34 yards, 1:04; North Carolina Central 31–21)

Third Quarter

- (10:02) NCCU – Walker Harris 1-yard run, Kaleb Robinson kick (Drive: 10 plays, 44 yards, 4:54; North Carolina Central 38–21)
- (6:25) NCCU – 0-yard safety (North Carolina Central 40–21)
- (2:59) NCCU – Arthur Rodgers 2-yard run, Kaleb Robinson kick (Drive: 9 plays, 78 yards, 3:21; North Carolina Central 47–21)

Fourth Quarter

- (14:13) ETAM – Ron Peace 6-yard run, Ozlo Rigby kick (Drive: 5 plays, 30 yards, 1:56; North Carolina Central 47–28)
- (4:20) NCCU – Kaleb Robinson 24-yard field goal (Drive: 7 plays, 20 yards, 3:37; North Carolina Central 50–28)
- (1:56) ETAM – Devin Matthews 8-yard pass from Eric Rodriguez, Ozlo Rigby kick (Drive: 8 plays, 75 yards, 2:24; North Carolina Central 50–35)
- (0:51) ETAM – Christian Jourdain 21-yard pass from Eric Rodriguez, Ozlo Rigby kick (Drive: 8 plays, 47 yards, 1:03; North Carolina Central 50–42)

Statistics	NCCU	ETAM
First downs	25	22
Total yards	457	490
Rushing yards	169	34
Passing yards	288	456
Turnovers	2	2
Time of possession	36:57	23:03

Team	Category	Player	Statistics
North Carolina Central	Passing	Walker Harris	21/32, 288 yards, 2 TD
North Carolina Central	Rushing	Chris Mosley	26 carries, 72 yards, TD
North Carolina Central	Receiving	Chauncey Spikes	6 receptions, 113 yards, TD
East Texas A&M	Passing	Ron Peace	19/39, 356 yards, 2 TD, INT
East Texas A&M	Rushing	KJ Shankle	7 carries, 33 yards
East Texas A&M	Receiving	Christian Jourdain	7 receptions, 119 yards, TD

=== At Northwestern State ===
East Texas A&M Lions (0–4) at Northwestern State Demons (1–3) – Game summary

Quarter	1	2	3	4	Total
Lions	10	7	20	3	40
Demons	0	3	0	7	10

at Harry Turpin Stadium, Natchitoches, Louisiana

- Date: October 4
- Game time: 6:00 p.m.
- Game weather: Sunny • Temperature: 84 °F (29 °C) • Wind: E at 8 miles per hour (13 km/h)
- Game attendance: 11,262
- Referee: Matt Beck
- TV announcers (ESPN+): Patrick Netherton (play-by-play), Gary Reasons (analyst) and Jason Pugh (sideline)
- Box score, Recap

Game information

First Quarter

- (7:51) ETAM – EJ Oakmon 2-yard run, Ozlo Rigby kick (Drive: 9 plays, 77 yards, 4:44; East Texas A&M 7–0)
- (0:59) ETAM – Ozlo Rigby 39-yard field goal (Drive: 10 plays, 41 yards, 4:52; East Texas A&M 10–0)

Second Quarter

- (3:15) ETAM – EJ Oakmon 5-yard run, Ozlo Rigby kick (Drive: 14 plays, 80 yards, 6:30; East Texas A&M 17–0)
- (0:00) NWST – Cooper Evans 30-yard field goal (Drive: 10 plays, 81 yards, 1:48; East Texas A&M 17–3)

Third Quarter

- (11:40) ETAM – KJ Shankle 24-yard run (Drive: 6 plays, 91 yards, 3:14; East Texas A&M 23–3)
- (7:57) ETAM – Christian Jourdain 46-yard pass from Ron Peace, Ozlo Rigby kick (Drive: 4 plays, 67 yards, 1:44; East Texas A&M 30–3)
- (0:22) ETAM – EJ Oakmon 12-yard run, Ozlo Rigby kick (Drive: 8 plays, 65 yards, 3:44; East Texas A&M 37–3)

Fourth Quarter

- (9:25) NWST – Kolbe Burrell 4-yard run, Cooper Evans kick (Drive: 8 plays, 62 yards, 3:10; East Texas A&M 37–10)
- (4:52) ETAM – Ozlo Rigby 47-yard field goal (Drive: 10 plays, 45 yards, 4:33; East Texas A&M 40–10)

Statistics	ETAM	NWST
First downs	29	17
Total yards	532	190
Rushing yards	261	66
Passing yards	271	124
Turnovers	1	1
Time of possession	37:15	22:45

Team	Category	Player	Statistics
East Texas A&M	Passing	Ron Peace	14/19, 268 yards, TD, INT
East Texas A&M	Rushing	KJ Shankle	11 carries, 93 yards, TD
East Texas A&M	Receiving	Devin Matthews	4 receptions, 109 yards
Northwestern State	Passing	Abram Johnston	13/27, 124 yards, INT
Northwestern State	Rushing	Kolbe Burrell	5 carries, 26 yards, TD
Northwestern State	Receiving	Amaaz Eugene	2 receptions, 42 yards

=== No. 20 Lamar ===
No. 20 Lamar Cardinals (4–1) at East Texas A&M Lions (1–4) – Game summary

Quarter	1	2	3	4	Total
No. 20 Cardinals	0	3	10	20	33
Lions	10	6	7	0	23

at Ernest Hawkins Field at Memorial Stadium, Commerce, Texas

- Date: October 11
- Game time: 6:00 p.m.
- Game weather: Sunny, 85 °F (29 °C)
- Game attendance: 2,713
- Referee: Austin Mezzacasa
- TV: ESPN+
- Box score, Recap

Game information
First quarter
- ETAM – Kyree Anderson 29-yard fumble return (Ozlo Rigby kick), 12:04. Lions 7–0.
- ETAM – Ozlo Rigby 38-yard field goal, 0:07. Lions 10–0. Drive: 10 plays, 59 yards, 3:40.

Second quarter

- LAM – Ben Woodward 21-yard field goal, 12:09. Lions 10–3. Drive: 6 plays, 70 yards, 2:51.
- ETAM – Ozlo Rigby 20-yard field goal, 4:04. Lions 13–3. Drive: 16 plays, 70 yards, 7:59.
- ETAM – Ozlo Rigby 26-yard field goal, 0:03. Lions 16–3. Drive: 9 plays, 71 yards, 0:59.

Third quarter

- LAM – Ben Woodward 42-yard field goal, 9:53. Lions 16–6. Drive: 10 plays, 50 yards, 5:07.
- LAM – Peyton Christian 12-yard fumble return (Ben Woodward kick), 9:38. Lions 16–13.
- ETAM – Ron Peace 6-yard run (Ozlo Rigby kick), 6:27. Lions 23–13. Drive: 8 plays, 83 yards, 3:06.

Fourth quarter

- LAM – Joshua Robinson 4-yard run (Ben Woodward kick), 9:05. Lions 23–20. Drive: 6 plays, 60 yards, 2:42.
- LAM – Kyndon Fuselier 5-yard pass from Aiden McCown (Ben Woodward kick), 0:03. Cardinals 27–23. Drive: 9 plays, 36 yards, 2:24.
- LAM – Ronnie Hamrick 9-yard fumble return, 0:00. Cardinals 33–23.

Statistics	LAM	ETAM
First downs	22	19
Total yards	348	329
Rushing yards	63	115
Passing yards	285	214
Turnovers	1	2
Time of possession	30:57	29:03

Team	Category	Player	Statistics
Lamar	Passing	Aiden McCown	24/33, 285 yards, TD
Lamar	Rushing	Joshua Robinson	7 rushes, 27 yards, TD
Lamar	Receiving	Kyndon Fuselier	7 receptions, 71 yards, TD
East Texas A&M	Passing	Ron Peace	20/31, 214 yards
East Texas A&M	Rushing	KJ Shankle	11 rushes, 59 yards
East Texas A&M	Receiving	Christian Jourdain	6 receptions, 48 yards

=== At Incarnate Word ===
East Texas A&M Lions (1–5) at Incarnate Word Cardinals (2–4) – Game summary

Quarter	1	2	3	4	Total
Lions	7	14	14	17	52
Cardinals	21	14	7	3	45

at Gayle and Tom Benson Stadium, San Antonio, Texas

- Date: October 18
- Game time: 4:30 p.m. CDT
- Game weather: Sunny, 94 °F (34 °C)
- Game attendance: 2,016
- Referee: James Brookhart
- TV announcers (ESPN+): Karl Schoening (play-by-play) & Sam Kaman (analyst)
- Box Score, Recap

Game information
First quarter
- UIW – Jaylon Spears 9-yard run (Will Faris kick), 12:16. Cardinals 7–0. Drive: 9 plays, 67 yards, 2:34.
- ETAM – Paul Odidi 37-yard pass from Ron Peace (Ozlo Rigby kick), 10:55. Tied 7–7. Drive: 4 plays, 75 yards, 1:21.
- UIW – Jaylon Spears 10-yard run (Will Faris kick), 3:18. Cardinals 14–7. Drive: 11 plays, 68 yards, 4:29.
- UIW – Jalen Walthall 27-yard pass from E. J. Colson (Will Faris kick), 1:15. Cardinals 21–7. Drive: 2 plays, 33 yards, 0:28.

Second quarter

- UIW – Austin Samaha 1-yard run (Will Faris kick), 14:56. Cardinals 28–7. Drive: 3 plays, 22 yards, 0:37.
- ETAM – E. J. Oakmon 1-yard run (Ozlo Rigby kick), 9:58. Cardinals 28–14. Drive: 13 plays, 75 yards, 4:58.
- ETAM – Devin Matthews 39-yard pass from Ron Peace (Ozlo Rigby kick), 4:20. Cardinals 28–21. Drive: 8 plays, 61 yards, 2:35.
- UIW – Jaylon Spears 11-yard run (Will Faris kick), 0:27. Cardinals 35–21. Drive: 5 plays, 66 yards, 1:13.

Third quarter

- ETAM – Paul Odidi 6-yard pass from Eric Rodriguez (Ozlo Rigby kick), 8:44. Cardinals 35–28. Drive: 6 plays, 74 yards, 3:04.
- UIW – Josh Lorick 25-yard pass from E. J. Colson (Will Faris kick), 3:13. Cardinals 42–28. Drive: 3 plays, 18 yards, 1:38.
- ETAM – Eric Rodriguez 8-yard run (Ozlo Rigby kick), 1:02. Cardinals 42–35. Drive: 6 plays, 75 yards, 2:11.

Fourth quarter

- ETAM – Devin Matthews 17-yard pass from Eric Rodriguez (Ozlo Rigby kick), 12:55. Tied 42–42. Drive: 8 plays, 58 yards, 2:10.
- ETAM – Ozlo Rigby 36-yard field goal, 6:45. Lions 45–42. Drive: 10 plays, 64 yards, 4:56.
- UIW – Will Faris 57-yard field goal, 1:55. Tied 45–45. Drive: 12 plays, 36 yards, 4:50.
- ETAM – E. J. Oakmon 24-yard run (Ozlo Rigby kick), 0:27. Lions 52–45. Drive: 9 plays, 75 yards, 1:28.

Statistics	ETAM	UIW
First downs	27	26
Total yards	526	492
Rushing yards	141	217
Passing yards	385	275
Turnovers	2	2
Time of possession	29:30	30:30

Team	Category	Player	Statistics
East Texas A&M	Passing	Eric Rodriguez	16/21, 193 yards, 2 TD
East Texas A&M	Rushing	E. J. Oakmon	8 rushes, 45 yards, TD
East Texas A&M	Receiving	Paul Odidi	9 receptions, 112 yards, TD
Incarnate Word	Passing	E. J. Colson	24/34, 275 yards, 2 TD, 2 INT
Incarnate Word	Rushing	Jaylon Spears	18 rushes, 85 yards, 3 TD
Incarnate Word	Receiving	Jalen Walthall	9 receptions, 96 yards, TD

=== No. 24 Stephen F. Austin ===
No. 24 Stephen F. Austin Lumberjacks (5–2) at East Texas A&M Lions (2–5) – Game summary

Quarter	1	2	3	4	Total
No. 24 Lumberjacks	7	7	7	10	31
Lions	14	0	0	7	21

at Ernest Hawkins Field at Memorial Stadium, Commerce, Texas

- Date: October 25
- Game time: 6:00 p.m. CST
- Game weather: Cloudy, 70 °F (21 °C)
- Game attendance: 3,141
- Referee: Gary Leeper
- TV announcers (ESPN+): Greg Higgins (play-by-play) and Adam Routon (analyst)
- Box Score, Recap

Game information
First quarter
- SFA – Kylon Harris 13-yard pass from Sam Vidlak (Carlos Alvarado kick), 10:10. Lumberjacks 7–0. Drive: 11 plays, 75 yards, 4:50.
- ETAM – Devin Matthews 21-yard pass from Ron Peace (Ozlo Rigby kick), 3:28. Tied 7–7. Drive: 6 plays, 55 yards, 2:13.
- ETAM – Ron Peace 6-yard run (Ozlo Rigby kick), 0:15. Lions 14–7. Drive: 4 plays, 55 yards, 1:45.

Second quarter

- SFA – Gavin Rutherford 1-yard run (Carlos Alvarado kick), 1:41. Tied 14–14. Drive: 12 plays, 68 yards, 4:50.

Third quarter

- SFA – Kylon Harris 38-yard pass from Sam Vidlak (Carlos Alvarado kick), 2:10. Lumberjacks 21–14. Drive: 10 plays, 99 yards, 4:04.

Fourth quarter

- ETAM – K. J. Shankle 1-yard run (Ozlo Rigby kick), 13:13. Tied 21–21. Drive: 3 plays, 13 yards, 1:24.
- SFA – Gavin Rutherford 1-yard run (Carlos Alvarado kick), 7:21. Lumberjacks 28–21. Drive: 12 plays, 75 yards, 5:52.
- SFA – Carlos Alvarado 40-yard field goal, 1:56. Lumberjacks 31–21. Drive: 7 plays, 21 yards, 2:24.

Statistics	SFA	ETAM
First downs	29	15
Total yards	452	260
Rushing yards	143	10
Passing yards	309	250
Turnovers	4	1
Time of possession	37:08	22:52

Team	Category	Player	Statistics
Stephen F. Austin	Passing	Sam Vidlak	30/46, 309 yards, 2 TD, 3 INT
Stephen F. Austin	Rushing	Jerrell Wimbley	26 rushes, 124 yards
Stephen F. Austin	Receiving	Kylon Harris	16 receptions, 183 yards, 2 TD
East Texas A&M	Passing	Ron Peace	18/37, 250 yards, TD, INT
East Texas A&M	Rushing	K. J. Shankle	11 rushes, 19 yards, TD
East Texas A&M	Receiving	Devin Matthews	4 receptions, 84 yards, TD

=== At No. 21 Southeastern Louisiana ===
East Texas A&M Lions (2–6) at No. 21 Southeastern Louisiana Lions (6–2) – Game summary

Quarter	1	2	Total
East Texas A&M			0
No. 21 Southeastern Louisiana			0

at Strawberry Stadium, Hammond, Louisiana

- Date: November 1
- Game time: 6:00 p.m.
- TV: ESPN+

Statistics	ETAM	SELA
First downs		
Total yards		
Rushing yards		
Passing yards		
Turnovers		
Time of possession		

Team	Category	Player	Statistics
East Texas A&M	Passing		
East Texas A&M	Rushing		
East Texas A&M	Receiving		
Southeastern Louisiana	Passing		
Southeastern Louisiana	Rushing		
Southeastern Louisiana	Receiving		

=== McNeese ===
McNeese Cowboys (3–6) at East Texas A&M Lions (2–7) – Game summary

Quarter	1	2	Total
Cowboys			0
Lions			0

at Ernest Hawkins Field at Memorial Stadium, Commerce, Texas

- Date: November 8
- Game time: 4:00 p.m.
- TV: ESPN+

Statistics	MCN	ETAM
First downs		
Total yards		
Rushing yards		
Passing yards		
Turnovers		
Time of possession		

Team	Category	Player	Statistics
McNeese	Passing		
McNeese	Rushing		
McNeese	Receiving		
East Texas A&M	Passing		
East Texas A&M	Rushing		
East Texas A&M	Receiving		

=== Houston Christian ===
Houston Christian Huskies at East Texas A&M Lions – Game summary

Quarter	1	2	Total
Huskies			0
Lions			0

at Ernest Hawkins Field at Memorial Stadium, Commerce, Texas

- Date: November 15
- Game time: 4:00 p.m.
- TV: ESPN+

Statistics	HCU	ETAM
First downs		
Total yards		
Rushing yards		
Passing yards		
Turnovers		
Time of possession		

Team	Category	Player	Statistics
Houston Christian	Passing		
Houston Christian	Rushing		
Houston Christian	Receiving		
East Texas A&M	Passing		
East Texas A&M	Rushing		
East Texas A&M	Receiving		

=== At UT Rio Grande Valley ===
East Texas A&M Lions at UT Rio Grande Valley Vaqueros – Game summary

Quarter	1	2	3	4	Total
Lions	7	0	0	7	14
Vaqueros	7	13	3	10	33

at Robert and Janet Vackar Stadium, Edinburg, Texas

- Date: November 22
- Game time: 5:00 p.m.
- Game weather: Cloudy
- Game attendance: 12,320
- Referee: Gary Leeper
- TV announcers (ESPN+): Mark May (play-by-play), Aaron Saenz (analyst) and Jaeda Rael (sideline)
- Box Score, Recap

Game information
First quarter
- ETAM – EJ Oakmon 1-yard run (Ozlo Rigby kick), 6:38. Lions 7–0. Drive: 18 plays, 80 yards, 8:16.
- RGV – Logic Hudgens 52-yard interception return (Brysen Gardner kick), 3:17. Tied 7–7.

Second quarter

- RGV – Ismael Smith Flores 20-yard pass from Eddie Lee Marburger (Brysen Gardner kick), 7:55. Vaqueros 14–7. Drive: 12 plays, 91 yards, 6:49.
- RGV – Brysen Gardner 31-yard field goal, 3:15. Vaqueros 17–7. Drive: 5 plays, 28 yards, 2:37.
- RGV – Brysen Gardner 36-yard field goal, 0:00. Vaqueros 20–7. Drive: 6 plays, 47 yards, 0:39.

Third quarter

- RGV – Brysen Gardner 22-yard field goal, 9:02. Vaqueros 23–7. Drive: 7 plays, 34 yards, 3:22.

Fourth quarter

- RGV – Kyran Lee 4-yard pass from Eddie Lee Marburger (Brysen Gardner kick), 13:05. Vaqueros 30–7. Drive: 12 plays, 69 yards, 6:44.
- RGV – Brysen Gardner 31-yard field goal, 4:01. Vaqueros 33–7. Drive: 10 plays, 72 yards, 4:59.
- ETAM – Tyler Daniels 24-yard pass from Jack Jacobs (Ozlo Rigby kick), 1:54. Vaqueros 33–14. Drive: 7 plays, 72 yards, 1:58.

Statistics	ETAM	RGV
First downs	23	25
Total yards	314	312
Rushing yards	127	171
Passing yards	187	141
Turnovers	3	0
Time of possession	30:07	29:53

Team	Category	Player	Statistics
East Texas A&M	Passing	Eric Rodriguez	10/25, 97 yards, 2 INT
East Texas A&M	Rushing	KJ Shankle	9 rushes, 32 yards
East Texas A&M	Receiving	Christian Jourdain	8 receptions, 89 yards
UT Rio Grande Valley	Passing	Eddie Lee Marburger	17/22, 141 yards, 2 TD
UT Rio Grande Valley	Rushing	Nathan Denney	26 rushes, 158 yards
UT Rio Grande Valley	Receiving	Tony Diaz	5 receptions, 50 yards
