= 2025 Houston Christian Huskies football team =

American college football season

2025 Houston Christian Huskies football
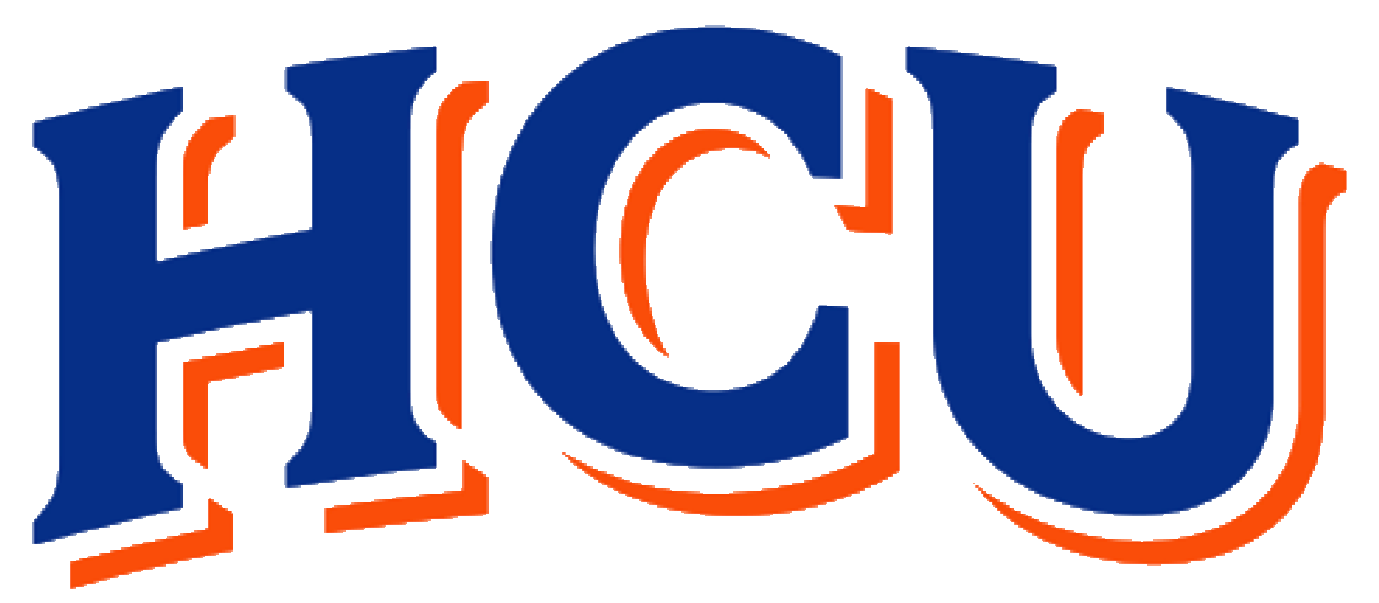
- Conference: Southland Conference
- Record: 2–10 (1–7 SLC)
- Head coach: Jason Bachtel (2nd season)
- Offensive coordinator: Mike Nesbitt (1st season)
- Offensive scheme: Air raid
- Defensive coordinator: Zach Wilkerson (2nd season)
- Base defense: 3–4
- Home stadium: Husky Stadium

2025 Southland Conference football standings
	Conf.			Overall
Team	W		L	W		L
No. 7 Stephen F. Austin $^	8	–	0	11	–	3
No. 19 Southeastern Louisiana ^	7	–	1	9	–	4
No. 24 Lamar ^	5	–	3	8	–	5
UT Rio Grande Valley	5	–	3	9	–	3
Nicholls	4	–	4	4	–	8
McNeese	4	–	4	5	–	7
East Texas A&M	3	–	5	3	–	9
Incarnate Word	3	–	5	5	–	7
Houston Christian	1	–	7	2	–	10
Northwestern State	0	–	8	1	–	11
$ – Conference champion; ^ – FCS playoff participant; Rankings from STATS Poll

The 2025 Houston Christian Huskies football team represented Houston Christian University in the 2025 NCAA Division I FCS football season. The Huskies played their home games at Husky Stadium in Houston, Texas, and competed in the Southland Conference. They were led by second-year head coach Jason Bachtel.

== Schedule ==
Date	Time	Opponent	Site	TV	Result	Attendance
August 28	6:30 pm	Arkansas Baptist*	Husky Stadium; Houston, TX	ESPN+	W 69–0	1,183
September 6	5:00 pm	at Eastern Kentucky*	Roy Kidd Stadium; Richmond, KY	ESPN+	L 10–20	5,193
September 13	11:00 am	at Nebraska*	Memorial Stadium; Lincoln, NE	FS1	L 7–59	86,292
September 20	6:00 pm	Northern Colorado*	Husky Stadium; Houston, TX	ESPN+	L 23–26 ^{OT}	1,249
October 4	7:00 pm	at UT Rio Grande Valley	Robert and Janet Vackar Stadium; Edinburg, TX	ESPN+	L 7–27	12,903
October 11	6:00 pm	Northwestern State	Husky Stadium; Houston, TX	ESPN+	W 20–17	1,645
October 18	6:00 pm	at McNeese	Cowboy Stadium; Lake Charles, LA	ESPN+	L 0–27	10,339
October 25	2:00 pm	Southeastern Louisiana	Husky Stadium; Houston, TX	ESPN+	L 14−38	1,082
November 1	3:00 pm	at Nicholls	Manning Field at John L. Guidry Stadium; Thibodaux, LA	ESPN+	L 7–31	6,524
November 8	2:00 pm	No. 17 Stephen F. Austin	Husky Stadium; Houston, TX	ESPN+	L 3–50	1,859
November 15	4:00 pm	at East Texas A&M	Ernest Hawkins Field at Memorial Stadium; Commerce, TX	ESPN+	L 32–37	2,923
November 22	2:00 pm	Incarnate Word	Husky Stadium; Houston, TX	ESPN+	L 10–31	1,357
*Non-conference game; Rankings from STATS Poll released prior to the game; All times are in Central time

== Game summaries ==
=== Arkansas Baptist (NAIA) ===
Arkansas Baptist Buffaloes (NAIA) (0–0) at Houston Christian Huskies (0–0) – Game summary

Quarter	1	2	3	4	Total
Buffaloes (NAIA)	0	0	0	0	0
Huskies	14	6	28	21	69

at Husky Stadium, Houston, Texas

- Date: August 28
- Game time: 6:30 PM CDT
- Game attendance: 1,183
- Referee: Matt Beck
- TV: ESPN+

Game information

First quarter

- HCU – Darryle Evans 12-yard run (Charlie Weinrich kick), 13:17. Huskies 7–0. Drive: 5 plays, 59 yards, 1:34.
- HCU – Darryle Evans 1-yard run (Charlie Weinrich kick), 5:49. Huskies 14–0. Drive: 12 plays, 64 yards, 5:08.

Second quarter

- HCU – Adrian Green 7-yard pass from Jake Weir (pass failed), 9:58. Huskies 20–0. Drive: 9 plays, 61 yards, 3:32.

Third quarter

- HCU – Darryle Evans 1-yard run (Charlie Weinrich kick), 11:06. Huskies 27–0. Drive: 6 plays, 14 yards, 2:18.
- HCU – Xai'Shaun Edwards 9-yard run (Charlie Weinrich kick), 9:19. Huskies 34–0. Drive: 3 plays, 33 yards, 0:47.
- HCU – Xai'Shaun Edwards 1-yard run (Charlie Weinrich kick), 4:46. Huskies 41–0. Drive: 9 plays, 50 yards, 3:41.
- HCU – Xai'Shaun Edwards 30-yard run (Charlie Weinrich kick), 1:59. Huskies 48–0. Drive: 4 plays, 58 yards, 1:36.

Fourth quarter

- HCU – Xai'Shaun Edwards 60-yard run (Charlie Weinrich kick), 14:27. Huskies 55–0. Drive: 2 plays, 60 yards, 0:21.
- HCU – Ja'Ryan Wallace 5-yard pass from Maddox Kopp (Charlie Weinrich kick), 9:47. Huskies 62–0. Drive: 8 plays, 57 yards, 3:26.
- HCU – Jordan Montanez 4-yard run (Charlie Weinrich kick), 2:50. Huskies 69–0. Drive: 9 plays, 61 yards, 5:25.

Statistics	ARKB	HCU
First downs	2	31
Plays–yards	53–112	76–531
Rushes–yards	26–50	55–402
Passing yards	62	129
Passing: Comp–Att–Int	7–27–2	14–21–1
Turnovers	2	2
Time of possession	26:05	33:55

Team	Category	Player	Statistics
Arkansas Baptist	Passing	Tyler Strickland	7/19, 62 yards, INT
Arkansas Baptist	Rushing	Ingram Battles	6 carries, 19 yards
Arkansas Baptist	Receiving	Taylor Poole	1 reception, 29 yards
Houston Christian	Passing	Jake Weir	10/16, 84 yards, TD, INT
Houston Christian	Rushing	Xai'Shaun Edwards	17 carries, 175 yards, 4 TD
Houston Christian	Receiving	Sam Peiffer	3 receptions, 31 yards

=== at Eastern Kentucky ===
Houston Christian Huskies (1–0) at Eastern Kentucky Colonels (0–1) – Game summary

Quarter	1	2	3	4	Total
Huskies	3	7	0	0	10
Colonels	13	0	0	7	20

at Roy Kidd Stadium, Richmond, Kentucky

- Date: September 6
- Game time: 5:00 PM CDT
- Game weather: Cloudy • Temperature: 56 °F (13 °C)
- Game attendance: 5,193
- Referee: Gabriel Tomlin
- TV announcers (ESPN+): Greg Stotelmyer (play-by-play) and Jim Tirey (analyst)

Game information

First Quarter

- (11:19) EKU – Buzz Flabiano 30-yard field goal (Drive: 5 plays, 8 yards, 2:46; Eastern Kentucky 3–0)
- (4:15) HCU – Charlie Weinrich 23-yard field goal (Drive: 17 plays, 63 yards, 6:59; Tied 3–3)
- (2:17) EKU – Derek Taylor 75-yard fumble recovery, Buzz Flabiano kick (Eastern Kentucky 10–3)
- (0:15) EKU – Buzz Flabiano 36-yard field goal (Drive: 4 plays, 6 yards, 1:56; Eastern Kentucky 13–3)

Second Quarter

- (5:43) HCU – Deuce McMillan 16-yard pass from Jake Weir, Charlie Weinrich kick (Drive: 8 plays, 52 yards, 2:56; Eastern Kentucky 13–10)

Third Quarter

No scoring plays

Fourth Quarter

- (13:46) EKU – Myles Burkett 1-yard run, Buzz Flabiano kick (Drive: 12 plays, 50 yards, 6:09; Eastern Kentucky 20–10)

Statistics	HCU	EKU
First downs	17	10
Total yards	259	173
Rushing yards	42	94
Passing yards	217	79
Turnovers	4	2
Time of possession	27:00	28:24

Team	Category	Player	Statistics
Houston Christian	Passing	Jake Weir	22/45, 217 yards, TD
Houston Christian	Rushing	Darryle Evans	15 carries, 40 yards
Houston Christian	Receiving	Tamarcus Gray Jr.	10 receptions, 80 yards
Eastern Kentucky	Passing	Myles Burkett	13/19, 79 yards, INT
Eastern Kentucky	Rushing	Brayden Latham	21 carries, 53 yards
Eastern Kentucky	Receiving	Dequan Stanley	5 receptions, 34 yards

=== at Nebraska (FBS) ===
Houston Christian Huskies (1–1) at Nebraska Cornhuskers (FBS) (2–0) – Game summary

Quarter	1	2	3	4	Total
Huskies	0	0	7	0	7
Cornhuskers (FBS)	17	21	14	7	59

at Memorial Stadium, Lincoln, Nebraska

- Date: September 13
- Game time: 11:00 AM CDT
- Game weather: Sunny, 84 °F (29 °C), Wind SW @ 14 mph (23 km/h)
- Game attendance: 86,292
- Referee: Jim Wharrie
- TV announcers (FS1): Eric Collins (play-by-play) and Spencer Tillman (analyst)

Game information

First Quarter

- (11:12) NEB – Kyle Cunanan 24-yard field goal (Drive: 9 plays, 66 yards, 3:43, Nebraska 3-0)
- (6:14) NEB – Jacory Barney Jr. 9-yard pass from Dylan Raiola, Kyle Cunanan kick (Drive: 6 plays, 45 yards, 2:47, Nebraska 10-0)
- (3:14) NEB – Dane Key 39-yard pass from Dylan Raiola, Kyle Cunanan kick (Drive: 3 plays, 84 yards, 0:50, Nebraska 17-0)

Second Quarter

- (11:34) NEB – Emmett Johnson 2-yard run, Kyle Cunanan kick (Drive: 9 plays, 70 yards, 3:42, Nebraska 24-0)
- (9:38) NEB – Williams Nwaneri 29-yard fumble return, Kyle Cunanan kick (Drive: 1:50, Nebraska 31-0)
- (2:52) NEB – Emmett Johnson 4-yard run, Kyle Cunanan kick (Drive: 10 plays, 75 yards, 3:48, Nebraska 38-0)

Third Quarter

- (9:19) NEB – TJ Lateef 6-yard run, Kyle Cunanan kick (Drive: 8 plays, 78 yards, 4:00, Nebraska 45-0)
- (7:34) HCU – Xai'Shaun Edwards 45-yard run, Charlie Weinrich kick (Drive: 4 plays, 75 yards, 1:45, Nebraska 45-7)
- (4:01) NEB – Kwinten Ives 4-yard run, Kyle Cunanan kick (Drive: 7 plays, 75 yards, 3:33, Nebraska 52-7)

Fourth Quarter

- (8:14) NEB – Cortez Mills Jr. 62-yard pass from TJ Lateef, Kyle Cunanan kick (Drive: 3 plays, 80 yards, 1:22, Nebraska 59-7)

Statistics	HCU	NEB
First downs	11	30
Plays–yards	53–160	67–554
Rushes–yards	35–93	38–192
Passing yards	67	362
Passing: Comp–Att–Int	11–18–0	23–29–0
Turnovers	2	0
Time of possession	29:43	30:17

Team	Category	Player	Statistics
Houston Christian	Passing	Jake Weir	11/18, 67 yards
Houston Christian	Rushing	Xai'Shaun Edwards	13 carries, 82 yards, TD
Houston Christian	Receiving	Ja'Ryan Wallace	5 receptions, 31 yards
Nebraska	Passing	Dylan Raiola	15/21, 222 yards, 2 TD
Nebraska	Rushing	Emmett Johnson	13 carries, 78 yards, 2 TD
Nebraska	Receiving	Dane Key	4 receptions, 104 yards, TD

=== Northern Colorado ===
Northern Colorado Bears (1–2) at Houston Christian Huskies (1–2) – Game summary

Quarter	1	2	3	4	OT	Total
Bears	7	10	3	0	6	26
Huskies	7	7	3	3	3	23

at Husky Stadium, Houston, Texas

- Date: September 20
- Game time: 6:00 PM CDT
- Game weather: Sunny • Temperature: 87 °F (31 °C) • Wind: N at 5 miles per hour (8.0 km/h)
- Game attendance: 1,249
- Referee: Matt Beck
- TV announcers (ESPN+): Christian Saez (play-by-play) and Matthew Galtor (analyst)

Game information

First quarter

- (10:43) HCU – Rodney Dansby 37-yard interception return, Charlie Weinrich kick (Houston Christian 7–0)
- (4:41) UNCO – Carver Cheeks 6-yard pass from Eric Gibson, Jacob Willig kick (Drive: 12 plays, 75 yards, 6:02; Tied 7–7)

Second quarter

- (10:36) UNCO – Jacob Willig 48-yard field goal (Drive: 6 plays, 16 yards, 3:02; Northern Colorado 10–7)
- (7:31) UNCO – Mathias Price 6-yard run, Jacob Willig kick (Drive: 2 plays, 14 yards, 0:26; Northern Colorado 17–7)
- (0:29) HCU – Tyran Chappell 82-yard interception return, Charlie Weinrich kick (Northern Colorado 17–14)

Third quarter

- (6:16) UNCO – Jacob Willig 27-yard field goal (Drive: 12 plays, 59 yards, 7:20; Northern Colorado 20–14)
- (4:21) HCU – Charlie Weinrich 46-yard field goal (Drive: 8 plays, 47 yards, 1:55; Northern Colorado 20–17)

Fourth quarter

- (2:47) HCU – Charlie Weinrich 50-yard field goal (Drive: 4 plays, 6 yards, 0:45; Tied 20–20)

Overtime

- HCU – Charlie Weinrich 37-yard field goal (Drive: 4 plays, 7 yards, 0:00; Houston Christian 23–20)
- UNCO – Hank Gibbs 1-yard run (Drive: 6 plays, 25 yards, 0:00; Northern Colorado 26–23)

Statistics	UNCO	HCU
First downs	24	8
Plays–yards	91–437	58–200
Rushes–yards	54–222	23–40
Passing yards	215	160
Passing: Comp–Att–Int	24–37–2	17–35–0
Turnovers	3	1
Time of possession	38:25	21:35

Team	Category	Player	Statistics
Northern Colorado	Passing	Eric Gibson	24/37, 215 yards, TD, 2 INT
Northern Colorado	Rushing	Mathias Price	27 carries, 126 yards, TD
Northern Colorado	Receiving	Carver Cheeks	8 receptions, 101 yards, TD
Houston Christian	Passing	Jake Weir	17/35, 160 yards
Houston Christian	Rushing	Xai'Shaun Edwards	9 carries, 28 yards
Houston Christian	Receiving	Ja'Ryan Wallace	3 receptions, 44 yards

=== at UT Rio Grande Valley ===
Houston Christian Huskies (1–3) at UT Rio Grande Valley Vaqueros (4–1) – Game summary

Quarter	1	2	3	4	Total
Huskies	0	7	0	0	7
Vaqueros	7	0	7	13	27

at Robert and Janet Vackar Stadium, Edinburg, Texas

- Date: October 4
- Game time: 7:00 p.m. CDT
- Game weather: Clear • Temperature: 89 °F (32 °C)
- Game attendance: 12,903
- Referee: Austin Mezzacasa
- TV announcers (ESPN+): Mark May (play-by-play), Aaron Saenz (analyst) and Jaeda Rael (sideline)

Game information

First Quarter

- (0:17) RGV – Eddie Lee Marburger 30-yard run, Brysen Gardner kick (Drive: 4 plays, 80 yards, 2:07; UT Rio Grande Valley 7–0)

Second Quarter

- (7:26) HCU – Xai'Shaun Edwards 1-yard run, Charlie Weinrich kick (Drive: 17 plays, 75 yards, 7:51; Tied 7–7)

Third Quarter

- (9:12) RGV – Eddie Lee Marburger 1-yard run, Brysen Gardner kick (Drive: 9 plays, 75 yards, 5:48; UT Rio Grande Valley 14–7)

Fourth Quarter

- (12:48) RGV – Brysen Gardner 25-yard field goal (Drive: 10 plays, 47 yards, 3:56; UT Rio Grande Valley 17–7)
- (5:03) RGV – Ismael Smith Flores 4-yard pass from Eddie Lee Marburger, Brysen Gardner kick (Drive: 8 plays, 56 yards, 5:30; UT Rio Grande Valley 24–7)
- (2:41) RGV – Brysen Gardner 43-yard field goal (Drive: 4 plays, 8 yards, 1:14; UT Rio Grande Valley 27–7)

Statistics	HCU	RGV
First downs	16	16
Total yards	214	338
Rushing yards	49	207
Passing yards	165	131
Turnovers	2	2
Time of possession	28:37	31:23

Team	Category	Player	Statistics
Houston Christian	Passing	Jake Weir	18/35, 165 yards, INT
Houston Christian	Rushing	Xai'Shaun Edwards	23 carries, 101 yards, TD
Houston Christian	Receiving	Deuce McMillan	4 receptions, 40 yards
UT Rio Grande Valley	Passing	Eddie Lee Marburger	11/21, 131 yards, TD, 2 INT
UT Rio Grande Valley	Rushing	Eddie Lee Marburger	15 carries, 105 yards, 2 TD
UT Rio Grande Valley	Receiving	Xayvion Noland	2 receptions, 63 yards

=== Northwestern State ===
Northwestern State Demons (1–4) at Houston Christian Huskies (1–4) – Game summary

Quarter	1	2	3	4	Total
Demons	7	3	0	7	17
Huskies	7	6	7	0	20

at Husky Stadium, Houston, Texas

- Date: October 11
- Game time: 6:00 PM CDT
- TV: ESPN+

Statistics	NWST	HCU
First downs		
Plays–yards		
Rushes–yards		
Passing yards		
Turnovers		
Time of possession		

Team	Category	Player	Statistics
Northwestern State	Passing		
Northwestern State	Rushing		
Northwestern State	Receiving		
Houston Christian	Passing		
Houston Christian	Rushing		
Houston Christian	Receiving		

=== at McNeese ===
Houston Christian Huskies (2–4) at McNeese Cowboys (1–5) – Game summary

Quarter	1	2	Total
Huskies			0
Cowboys			0

at Cowboy Stadium, Lake Charles, Louisiana

- Date: October 18
- Game time: 6:00 PM CDT
- Game attendance: 10,339
- TV: ESPN+

Statistics	HCU	MCN
First downs		
Total yards		
Rushing yards		
Passing yards		
Turnovers		
Time of possession		

Team	Category	Player	Statistics
Houston Christian	Passing		
Houston Christian	Rushing		
Houston Christian	Receiving		
McNeese	Passing		
McNeese	Rushing		
McNeese	Receiving		

=== Southeastern Louisiana ===
Southeastern Louisiana Lions (5–2) at Houston Christian Huskies (2–5) – Game summary

Quarter	1	2	Total
Lions			0
Huskies			0

at Husky Stadium, Houston, Texas

- Date: October 25
- Game time: 2:00 PM CDT
- TV: ESPN+

Statistics	SELA	HCU
First downs		
Plays–yards		
Rushes–yards		
Passing yards		
Turnovers		
Time of possession		

Team	Category	Player	Statistics
Southeastern Louisiana	Passing		
Southeastern Louisiana	Rushing		
Southeastern Louisiana	Receiving		
Houston Christian	Passing		
Houston Christian	Rushing		
Houston Christian	Receiving		

=== at Nicholls ===
Houston Christian Huskies (2–6) at Nicholls Colonels (2–6) – Game summary

Quarter	1	2	Total
Huskies			0
Colonels			0

at Manning Field at John L. Guidry Stadium, Thibodaux, Louisiana

- Date: November 1
- Game time: 3:00 PM CDT
- TV: ESPN+

Statistics	HCU	NICH
First downs		
Total yards		
Rushing yards		
Passing yards		
Turnovers		
Time of possession		

Team	Category	Player	Statistics
Houston Christian	Passing		
Houston Christian	Rushing		
Houston Christian	Receiving		
Nicholls	Passing		
Nicholls	Rushing		
Nicholls	Receiving		

=== No. 17 Stephen F. Austin ===
No. 17 Stephen F. Austin Lumberjacks (7–2) at Houston Christian Huskies (2–7) – Game summary

Quarter	1	2	Total
No. 17 Lumberjacks			0
Huskies			0

at Husky Stadium, Houston, Texas

- Date: November 8
- Game time: 2:00 PM CST
- TV: ESPN+

Statistics	SFA	HCU
First downs		
Plays–yards		
Rushes–yards		
Passing yards		
Turnovers		
Time of possession		

Team	Category	Player	Statistics
Stephen F. Austin	Passing		
Stephen F. Austin	Rushing		
Stephen F. Austin	Receiving		
Houston Christian	Passing		
Houston Christian	Rushing		
Houston Christian	Receiving		

=== at East Texas A&M ===
Houston Christian Huskies at East Texas A&M Lions – Game summary

Quarter	1	2	Total
Huskies			0
Lions			0

at Ernest Hawkins Field at Memorial Stadium, Commerce, Texas

- Date: November 15
- Game time: 4:00 p.m. CDT
- TV: ESPN+

Statistics	HCU	ETAM
First downs		
Total yards		
Rushing yards		
Passing yards		
Turnovers		
Time of possession		

Team	Category	Player	Statistics
Houston Christian	Passing		
Houston Christian	Rushing		
Houston Christian	Receiving		
East Texas A&M	Passing		
East Texas A&M	Rushing		
East Texas A&M	Receiving		

=== Incarnate Word ===
Incarnate Word Cardinals at Houston Christian Huskies – Game summary

Quarter	1	2	Total
Cardinals			0
Huskies			0

at Husky Stadium, Houston, Texas

- Date: November 22
- Game time: 2:00 PM CST
- TV: ESPN+

Statistics	UIW	HCU
First downs		
Plays–yards		
Rushes–yards		
Passing yards		
Turnovers		
Time of possession		

Team	Category	Player	Statistics
Incarnate Word	Passing		
Incarnate Word	Rushing		
Incarnate Word	Receiving		
Houston Christian	Passing		
Houston Christian	Rushing		
Houston Christian	Receiving		
