= 2025 Stephen F. Austin Lumberjacks football team =

American college football season

2025 Stephen F. Austin Lumberjacks football

Southland champion

NCAA Division I Quarterfinals, L 28–44 at Montana State
- Conference: Southland Conference

Ranking
- STATS: No. 7
- FCS Coaches: No. 7
- Record: 11–3 (8–0 SLC)
- Head coach: Colby Carthel (7th season)
- Offensive coordinator: Chris Ross (2nd season)
- Offensive scheme: Spread
- Defensive coordinator: Mike Mutz (3rd season)
- Base defense: 4–2–5
- Home stadium: Homer Bryce Stadium

2025 Southland Conference football standings
	Conf.			Overall
Team	W		L	W		L
No. 7 Stephen F. Austin $^	8	–	0	11	–	3
No. 19 Southeastern Louisiana ^	7	–	1	9	–	4
No. 24 Lamar ^	5	–	3	8	–	5
UT Rio Grande Valley	5	–	3	9	–	3
Nicholls	4	–	4	4	–	8
McNeese	4	–	4	5	–	7
East Texas A&M	3	–	5	3	–	9
Incarnate Word	3	–	5	5	–	7
Houston Christian	1	–	7	2	–	10
Northwestern State	0	–	8	1	–	11
$ – Conference champion; ^ – FCS playoff participant; Rankings from STATS Poll

The 2025 Stephen F. Austin Lumberjacks football team represented Stephen F. Austin State University as a member of the Southland Conference (SLC) during the 2025 NCAA Division I FCS football season. The Lumberjacks were coached by seventh-year head coach Colby Carthel and played at Homer Bryce Stadium in Nacogdoches, Texas. After a win against Lamar in week 12, the Lumberjacks clinched their first Southland Conference title since the 2010 season. SFA secured the seventh seed and a first-round bye in the 2025 FCS Playoffs. This was their first non-opening round home playoff game since the Division I-AA Quarterfinals in 1989. SFA's season ended on December 12, 2025 in the Quarterfinals of the FCS Playoffs, where the Lumberjacks were defeated by Montana State, 44-28.

== Schedule ==
Date	Time	Opponent	Rank	Site	TV	Result	Attendance
August 28	7:00 p.m.	at Houston*	No. 23	TDECU Stadium; Houston, TX	ESPN+	L 0–27	28,150
September 6	7:00 p.m.	at No. 16 Abilene Christian*	No. 25	Wildcat Stadium; Abilene, TX	ESPN+	L 20–28	8,042
September 13	7:00 p.m.	Sul Ross*		Homer Bryce Stadium; Nacogdoches, TX	ESPN+	W 63–0	3,102
September 20	7:00 p.m.	Cal Poly*		Homer Bryce Stadium; Nacogdoches, TX	ESPN+	W 35–17	5,402
September 27	7:00 p.m.	McNeese		Homer Bryce Stadium; Nacogdoches, TX	ESPN+	W 34–17	10,684
October 4	6:00 p.m.	at Incarnate Word		Gayle and Tom Benson Stadium; San Antonio, TX	ESPN+	W 31–17	2,098
October 18	6:00 p.m.	Nicholls	No. 25	Homer Bryce Stadium; Nacogdoches, TX	ESPN+	W 34–7	7,141
October 25	6:00 p.m.	at East Texas A&M	No. 24	Ernest Hawkins Field at Memorial Stadium; Commerce, TX	ESPN+	W 31–21	3,141
November 1	6:00 p.m.	UT Rio Grande Valley	No. 20	Homer Bryce Stadium; Nacogdoches, TX	ESPN+	W 41–17	6,769
November 8	2:00 p.m.	at Houston Christian	No. 17	Husky Stadium; Houston, TX	ESPN+	W 50–3	1,859
November 15	6:00 p.m.	No. 19 Lamar	No. 15	Homer Bryce Stadium; Nacogdoches, TX	ESPN+	W 26–15	12,252
November 20	6:30 p.m.	at Northwestern State	No. 14	Harry Turpin Stadium; Natchitoches, LA (Chief Caddo)	ESPN+	W 62–14	4,285
December 6	1:00 p.m.	No. 13 Abilene Christian*	No. 10	Homer Bryce Stadium; Nacogdoches, TX (NCAA Division I Second Round)	ESPN+	W 41–34	8,645
December 12	8:00 p.m.	at No. 2 Montana State*	No. 10	Bobcat Stadium; Bozeman, MT (NCAA Division I Quarterfinals)	ESPN	L 28–44	19,807
*Non-conference game; Rankings from STATS Poll released prior to the game; All times are in Central time

== Rankings ==
Ranking movements Legend: ██ Increase in ranking ██ Decrease in ranking RV = Received votes
	Week														
Poll	Pre	1	2	3	4	5	6	7	8	9	10	11	12	13	Final
STATS	23	25	RV	RV	RV	RV	RV	25	24	20	17	15	14	10	7
Coaches	24	23	RV	RV	RV	RV	RV	RV	24	23	21	17	13	10	7

== Game summaries ==
=== At Houston (FBS) ===
No. 23 Stephen F. Austin Lumberjacks (0–0) at Houston Cougars (FBS) (0–0) – Game summary

Quarter	1	2	3	4	Total
No. 23 Lumberjacks	0	0	0	0	0
Cougars (FBS)	7	10	7	3	27

at TDECU Stadium • Houston, Texas

- Date: August 28
- Game time: 7:00 p.m.
- Game weather:
- Game attendance: 28,150
- Referee: Kevin Mar
- TV announcers (ESPN+): Pete Sousa and Taylor McHargue

Game information

First quarter

- HOU – Tanner Koziol 11-yard pass from Conner Weigman (Ethan Sanchez kick), 5:12. Cougars 7–0. Drive: 7 plays, 41 yards, 2:58.

Second quarter

- HOU – Ethan Sanchez 40-yard field goal, 8:24. Cougars 10–0. Drive: 10 plays, 33 yards, 3:47.
- HOU – J'Marion Burnette 39-yard pass from Conner Weigman (Ethan Sanchez kick), 3:06. Cougars 17–0. Drive: 10 plays, 96 yards, 3:46.

Third quarter

- HOU – Amare Thomas 20-yard pass from Conner Weigman (Ethan Sanchez kick), 8:36. Cougars 24–0. Drive: 11 plays, 75 yards, 6:24.

Fourth quarter

- HOU – Ethan Sanchez 43-yard field goal, 14:06. Cougars 27–0. Drive: 4 plays, 3 yards, 0:49.

Statistics	SFA	HOU
First downs	7	18
Plays–yards	144	343
Rushes–yards	39	191
Passing yards	105	152
Passing: comp–att–int	17-33-2	16-27-0
Turnovers	2	0
Time of possession	25:11	34:49

Team	Category	Player	Statistics
Stephen F. Austin	Passing	Gavin Rutherford	4/7, 53 yards, INT
Stephen F. Austin	Rushing	Jalyen Jenkins	5 carries, 16 yards
Stephen F. Austin	Receiving	Clayton Wayland	2 receptions, 43 yards
Houston	Passing	Conner Weigman	15/24, 159 yards, 3 TD
Houston	Rushing	Dean Connors	15 carries, 50 yards
Houston	Receiving	Tanner Koziol	7 receptions, 63 yards, TD

=== At No. 16 Abilene Christian ===
No. 25 Stephen F. Austin Lumberjacks (0-1) at No. 16 Abilene Christian Wildcats (0-1) – Game summary

Quarter	1	2	3	4	Total
No. 25 Lumberjacks	14	0	0	6	20
No. 16 Wildcats	0	21	7	0	28

at Wildcat Stadium, Abilene, Texas

- Date: September 6
- Game time: 7:00 PM CDT
- Game weather: Sunny, 76 °F (24 °C)
- Game attendance: 8,042
- Referee: Jeremee Tate
- TV: ESPN+
- Box Score

Game information

First quarter

- SFA – Jordan Nabors 7-yard run (Carlos Alvarado kick), 9:23. Lumberjacks 7–0. Drive: 10 plays, 61 yards, 3:42.
- SFA – Blaine Greene 3-yard pass from Gavin Rutherford (Carlos Alvarado kick), 1:43. Lumberjacks 14–0. Drive: 8 plays, 69 yards, 3:17.

Second quarter

- ACU – Stone Earle 1-yard run (Brandon Perez kick), 6:47. Lumberjacks 14–7. Drive: 16 plays, 82 yards, 6:44.
- ACU – Kaghen Roach 0-yard fumble return (Brandon Perez kick), 6:07. Tied 14–14.
- ACU – Jordon Vaughn 1-yard run (Brandon Perez kick), 1:57. Wildcats 21–14. Drive: 6 plays, 33 yards, 2:36.

Third quarter

- ACU – Jordon Vaughn 1-yard run (Brandon Perez kick), 9:58. Wildcats 28–14. Drive: 9 plays, 63 yards, 3:51.

Fourth quarter

- SFA – Bugs Mortimer 52-yard punt return (pass failed), 0:20. Wildcats 28–20.

Statistics	SFA	ACU
First downs	16	20
Total yards	300	371
Rushing yards	52	132
Passing yards	248	239
Turnovers	3	1
Time of possession	25:11	34:49

Team	Category	Player	Statistics
Stephen F. Austin	Passing	Sam Vidlak	24/38, 245 yards, INT
Stephen F. Austin	Rushing	Jerrell Wimbley	12 carries, 44 yards
Stephen F. Austin	Receiving	Kylon Harris	9 receptions, 105 yards
Abilene Christian	Passing	Stone Earle	23/34, 239 yards
Abilene Christian	Rushing	Jordon Vaughn	23 carries, 87 yards, 2 TD
Abilene Christian	Receiving	Javon Gibson	7 receptions, 82 yards

=== Sul Ross (DII) ===
Sul Ross Lobos (DII) (0–1) at Stephen F. Austin Lumberjacks (0–2) – Game summary

Quarter	1	2	3	4	Total
Lobos (DII)	0	0	0	0	0
Lumberjacks	21	35	7	0	63

at Homer Bryce Stadium, Nacogdoches, Texas

- Date: September 13
- Game time: 7:00 PM CDT
- Game weather: Sunny, 90 °F (32 °C)
- Game attendance: 3,102
- Referee: Matt Beck
- TV announcers (ESPN+): Rob Myers (play-by-play) and Hunter Taylor (analyst)

Game information
First quarter
- SFA – Jerrell Wimbley 1-yard run (Carlos Alvarado kick), 11:31. Lumberjacks 7–0. Drive: 6 plays, 68 yards, 1:51.
- SFA – Richard Reese 64-yard pass from Sam Vidlak (Carlos Alvarado kick), 7:14. Lumberjacks 14–0. Drive: 5 plays, 80 yards, 1:20.
- SFA – Kylon Harris 32-yard pass from Sam Vidlak (Carlos Alvarado kick), 4:42. Lumberjacks 21–0. Drive: 1 play, 32 yards, 0:06.

Second quarter

- SFA – Jerrell Wimbley 12-yard run (Carlos Alvarado kick), 10:58. Lumberjacks 28–0. Drive: 3 plays, 28 yards, 0:53.
- SFA – Richard Reese 58-yard run (Carlos Alvarado kick), 8:13. Lumberjacks 35–0. Drive: 2 plays, 62 yards, 0:35.
- SFA – Saco Alofipo 0-yard fumble return (Carlos Alvarado kick), 8:00. Lumberjacks 42–0.
- SFA – Michael Woods 9-yard fumble return (Carlos Alvarado kick), 6:59. Lumberjacks 49–0.
- SFA – Isaiah Davis 30-yard pass from Gavin Rutherford (Carlos Alvarado kick), 1:24. Lumberjacks 56–0. Drive: 4 plays, 67 yards, 1:23.

Third quarter

- SFA – Anthony Williams 1-yard run (Carlos Alvarado kick), 2:45. Lumberjacks 63–0. Drive: 11 plays, 75 yards, 5:15.

Fourth quarter

- No scoring plays

Statistics	SROS	SFA
First downs	7	24
Plays–yards	-36	534
Rushes–yards	-33	247
Passing yards	-3	287
Turnovers	3	0
Time of possession	30:22	29:38

Team	Category	Player	Statistics
Sul Ross	Passing	Andrew Martinez	1/7, 1 yard, INT
Sul Ross	Rushing	Kendrick Jefferson	9 Att, 17 Yards, 0 TD
Sul Ross	Receiving	Liam Lowe	2 catches, -3 Yards
Stephen F. Austin	Passing	Sam Vidlak	11/14, 211 Yards, 2 TD, 0 INT
Stephen F. Austin	Rushing	Braden Lewis	9 carries, 77 yards
Stephen F. Austin	Receiving	Richard Reese	2 rec, 76 yards, TD

=== Cal Poly ===
Cal Poly Mustangs (2–1) at Stephen F. Austin Lumberjacks (1–2) – Game summary

Quarter	1	2	3	4	Total
Mustangs	3	7	0	7	17
Lumberjacks	0	14	21	0	35

at Homer Bryce Stadium, Nacogdoches, Texas

- Date: September 20
- Game time: 7:00 p.m. CDT
- Game weather: Sunny • Temperature: 90 °F (32 °C) • Wind: at 7 miles per hour (11 km/h)
- Game attendance: 5,402
- Referee: James Brookhart
- TV announcers (ESPN+): Rob Myers (play-by-play) and Hunter Taylor (analyst)

Game information

First quarter

- CP – Noah Serna 44-yard field goal, 2:31. Mustangs 3–0. Drive: 11 plays, 73 yards, 5:22.

Second quarter

- SFA – Clayton Wayland 13-yard pass from Sam Vidlak (Carlos Alvarado kick), 14:55. Lumberjacks 7–3. Drive: 3 plays, 26 yards, 0:26.
- CP – Michael Briscoe 64-yard pass from Jackson Akins (Gianluca Dimauro kick), 13:02. Mustangs 10–7. Drive: 6 plays, 75 yards, 1:53.
- SFA – Kylon Harris 65-yard punt return (Carlos Alvarado kick), 2:26. Lumberjacks 14–10.

Third quarter

- SFA – Malachi Williams 28-yard interception return (Carlos Alvarado kick), 14:16. Lumberjacks 21–10.
- SFA – Richard Reese 1-yard run (Carlos Alvarado kick), 7:31. Lumberjacks 28–10. Drive: 5 plays, 57 yards, 1:34.
- SFA – Derrick Bohler 28-yard pass from Sam Vidlak (Carlos Alvarado kick), 1:23. Lumberjacks 35–10. Drive: 4 plays, 82 yards, 1:31.

Fourth quarter

- CP – Kian Salehi 41-yard pass from Bo Kelly (Gianluca Dimauro kick), 2:59. Lumberjacks 35–17. Drive: 3 plays, 52 yards, 1:19.

Statistics	CP	SFA
First downs	19	18
Plays–yards	71–357	67–354
Rushes–yards	32–69	37–164
Passing yards	288	190
Passing: Comp–Att–Int	19–39–3	19–30–0
Turnovers	3	1
Time of possession	31:51	28:09

Team	Category	Player	Statistics
Cal Poly	Passing	Jackson Akins	13/29, 182 yards, TD, INT
Cal Poly	Rushing	Jackson Akins	10 carries, 36 yards
Cal Poly	Receiving	Michael Briscoe	4 receptions, 140 yards, TD
Stephen F. Austin	Passing	Sam Vidlak	16/23, 178 yards, 2 TD
Stephen F. Austin	Rushing	Jerrell Wimbley	10 carries, 130 yards
Stephen F. Austin	Receiving	Clayton Wayland	3 receptions, 57 yards, TD

=== McNeese ===
McNeese Cowboys (1–3) at Stephen F. Austin Lumberjacks (2–2) – Game summary

Quarter	1	2	3	4	Total
Cowboys	7	0	3	7	17
Lumberjacks	0	14	10	10	34

at Homer Bryce Stadium, Nacogdoches, Texas

- Date: September 27
- Game time: 7:00 PM CDT
- Game weather: Sunny
- Game attendance: 10,684
- Referee: Matt Beck
- TV announcers (ESPN+): Rob Myers (play-by-play) and Hunter Taylor (analyst)

Game information

First quarter

- (0:53) MCN – Tre'Vonte Citizen 20-yard run, Fabrizio Pinton kick (Drive: 10 plays, 57 yards, 4:26; McNeese 7–0)

Second quarter

- (9:21) SFA – Blaine Green 40-yard pass from Sam Vidlak, Carlos Alvarado kick (Drive: 6 plays, 60 yards, 2:20; Tied 7–7)
- (2:49) SFA – Kylon Harris 14-yard pass from Sam Vidlak, Carlos Alvarado kick (Drive: 6 plays, 27 yards, 1:40; Stephen F. Austin 14–7)

Third quarter

- (11:18) SFA – Kylon Harris 76-yard pass from Sam Vidlak, Carlos Alvarado kick (Drive: 4 plays, 95 yards, 1:48; Stephen F. Austin 21–7)
- (4:36) MCN – Fabrizio Pinton 37-yard field goal (Drive: 14 plays, 60 yards, 6:35; Stephen F. Austin 21–10)
- (0:49) SFA – Carlos Alvarado 40-yard field goal (Drive: 10 plays, 26 yards, 3:47; Stephen F. Austin 24–10)

Fourth quarter

- (6:43) SFA – Carlos Alvarado 24-yard field goal (Drive: 12 plays, 61 yards, 6:53; Stephen F. Austin 27–10)
- (2:27) MCN – Logan Mauldin 26-yard pass from Jake Strong, Fabrizio Pinton kick (Drive: 11 plays, 75 yards, 4:16; Stephen F. Austin 27–17)
- (1:51) SFA – Jerrell Wimbley 43-yard run, Carlos Alvarado kick (Drive: 2 plays, 63 yards, 0:36; Stephen F. Austin 34–17)

Statistics	MCN	SFA
First downs	18	19
Total yards	303	381
Rushing yards	89	149
Passing yards	214	233
Turnovers	3	1
Time of possession	32:12	27:48

Team	Category	Player	Statistics
McNeese	Passing	Jake Strong	21/34, 214 yards, TD, INT
McNeese	Rushing	Tre'Vonte Citizen	10 carries, 32 yards, TD
McNeese	Receiving	Logan Mauldin	6 receptions, 57 yards, TD
Stephen F. Austin	Passing	Sam Vidlak	15/29, 233 yards, 3 TD
Stephen F. Austin	Rushing	Jerrel Wimbley	29 carries, 171 yards, TD
Stephen F. Austin	Receiving	Kylon Harris	4 receptions, 111 yards, 2 TD

=== at Incarnate Word ===
Stephen F. Austin Lumberjacks (3–2) at Incarnate Word Cardinals (2–3) – Game summary

Quarter	1	2	3	4	Total
Lumberjacks	14	10	7	0	31
Cardinals	3	3	0	11	17

at Gayle and Tom Benson Stadium, San Antonio, Texas

- Date: October 4
- Game time: 6:00 PM CDT
- Game weather: Temperature: 89 • Wind: E 9 mph • Weather: Clear
- Game attendance: 2,098
- Referee: Craig Hesler
- TV announcers (ESPN+): Karl Schoening (play-by-play) & Sam Kaman (analyst)

Game information

First Quarter

- SFA – 13:06 Kylon Harris 20 yard pass from Sam Vidlak, Carlos Alvarado kick. SFA 7–0 Drive: 4 plays, 38 yards, 1:26
- SFA – 7:59 Derrick Bohler 37 yard pass from Sam Vidlak, Carlos Alvarado kick. SFA 14–0 Drive: 1 play, 37 yards, 0:07
- UIW – 1:30 Will Faris 36 yard field goal. SFA 14–3 Drive: 13 plays, 57 yards, 6:29

Second Quarter

- SFA – 11:33 Carlos Alvarado 30 yard field goal. SFA 17–3 Drive: 14 plays, 63 yards, 4:57
- SFA – 6:06 Isaiah Davis 45 yard pass from Sam Vidlak, Carlos Alvarado kick. SFA 24–3 Drive: 3 plays, 49 yards, 0:59
- UIW – 1:27 Will Faris 34 yard field goal. SFA 24–6 Drive: 12 plays, 41 yards, 4:34

Third Quarter

- SFA – 3:06 Jerrell Wimbley 1 yard run, Carlos Alvarado kick. SFA 31–6 Drive: 7 plays, 87 yards, 3:26

Fourth Quarter

- UIW – 14:09 Will Faris 37 yard field goal. SFA 31–9 Drive: 9 plays, 56 yards, 3:57
- UIW – 1:18 Josh Lorick 16 yard pass from EJ Colson, Jaylon Spears pass. SFA 31–17 Drive: 8 plays, 55 yards, 2:23

Statistics	SFA	UIW
First downs	15	21
Plays–yards	60–335	77–345
Rushes–yards	33–74	31–39
Passing yards	261	306
Turnovers	0	2
Time of possession	25:01	34:59

Team	Category	Player	Statistics
Stephen F. Austin	Passing	Sam Vidlak	19/26, 261 yards, 3 TD
Stephen F. Austin	Rushing	Jerrell Wimbley	21 carries, 69 yards, TD
Stephen F. Austin	Receiving	Clayton Wayland	6 receptions, 100 yards
Incarnate Word	Passing	EJ Colson	35/46, 306 yards, TD, INT
Incarnate Word	Rushing	Jaylon Spears	10 carries, 33 yards
Incarnate Word	Receiving	Jameson Garcia	4 receptions, 70 yards

=== Nicholls ===
Nicholls Colonels (1–5) at No. 25 Stephen F. Austin Lumberjacks (4–2) – Game summary

Quarter	1	2	3	4	Total
Colonels	0	0	0	7	7
No. 25 Lumberjacks	9	10	15	0	34

at Homer Bryce Stadium, Nacogdoches, Texas

- Date: October 18
- Game time: 6:00 PM CDT
- Game weather: Rain
- Game attendance: 7,141
- Referee: Craig Heiser
- TV: ESPN+

Statistics	NICH	SFA
First downs		
Total yards		
Rushing yards		
Passing yards		
Turnovers		
Time of possession		

Team	Category	Player	Statistics
Nicholls	Passing		
Nicholls	Rushing		
Nicholls	Receiving		
Stephen F. Austin	Passing		
Stephen F. Austin	Rushing		
Stephen F. Austin	Receiving		

=== at East Texas A&M ===
No. 24 Stephen F. Austin Lumberjacks (5–2) at East Texas A&M Lions (2–5) – Game summary

Quarter	1	2	3	4	Total
No. 24 Lumberjacks	7	7	7	10	31
Lions	14	0	0	7	21

at Ernest Hawkins Field at Memorial Stadium, Commerce, Texas

- Date: October 25
- Game time: 6:00 p.m. CDT
- Game weather: Cloudy
- Game attendance: 3,141
- Referee: Gary Leeper
- TV announcers (ESPN+): Greg Higgins (play-by-play) and Adam Routon (analyst)

Game information
First quarter
- SFA – Kylon Harris 13-yard pass from Sam Vidlak (Carlos Alvarado kick), 10:10. Lumberjacks 7–0. Drive: 11 plays, 75 yards, 4:50.
- ETAM – Devin Matthews 21-yard pass from Ron Peace (Ozlo Rigby kick), 3:28. Tied 7–7. Drive: 6 plays, 55 yards, 2:13.
- ETAM – Ron Peace 6-yard run (Ozlo Rigby kick), 0:15. Lions 14–7. Drive: 4 plays, 55 yards, 1:45.

Second quarter

- SFA – Gavin Rutherford 1-yard run (Carlos Alvarado kick), 1:41. Tied 14–14. Drive: 12 plays, 68 yards, 4:50.

Third quarter

- SFA – Kylon Harris 38-yard pass from Sam Vidlak (Carlos Alvarado kick), 2:10. Lumberjacks 21–14. Drive: 10 plays, 99 yards, 4:04.

Fourth quarter

- ETAM – K. J. Shankle 1-yard run (Ozlo Rigby kick), 13:13. Tied 21–21. Drive: 3 plays, 13 yards, 1:24.
- SFA – Gavin Rutherford 1-yard run (Carlos Alvarado kick), 7:21. Lumberjacks 28–21. Drive: 12 plays, 75 yards, 5:52.
- SFA – Carlos Alvarado 40-yard field goal, 1:56. Lumberjacks 31–21. Drive: 7 plays, 21 yards, 2:24.

Statistics	SFA	ETAM
First downs	29	15
Total yards	452	260
Rushing yards	143	10
Passing yards	309	250
Turnovers	4	1
Time of possession	37:08	22:52

Team	Category	Player	Statistics
Stephen F. Austin	Passing	Sam Vidlak	30/46, 309 yards, 2 TD, 3 INT
Stephen F. Austin	Rushing	Jerrell Wimbley	26 carries, 124 yards
Stephen F. Austin	Receiving	Kylon Harris	16 receptions, 183 yards, 2 TD
East Texas A&M	Passing	Ron Peace	18/37, 250 yards, TD, INT
East Texas A&M	Rushing	K. J. Shankle	11 carries, 19 yards, TD
East Texas A&M	Receiving	Devin Matthews	4 receptions, 84 yards, TD

=== UT Rio Grande Valley ===
UT Rio Grande Valley Vaqueros (6–2) at No. 20 Stephen F. Austin Lumberjacks (6–2) – Game summary

Quarter	1	2	3	4	Total
Vaqueros	0	0	10	7	17
No. 20 Lumberjacks	17	10	7	7	41

at Homer Bryce Stadium, Nacogdoches, Texas

- Date: November 1
- Game time: 6:00 p.m. CDT
- Game weather: Cloudy, 63 °F (17 °C)
- Game attendance: 6,769
- Referee: Matt Beck
- TV announcers (ESPN+): Rob Meyers (play-by-play), Hunter Taylor (analyst) and Nicole Beckelman (sideline)

Game information
First quarter
- SFA – Gavin Rutherford 1-yard run (Carlos Alvarado kick), 12:33. Lumberjacks 7–0. Drive: 9 plays, 95 yards, 2:21.
- SFA – Carlos Alvarado 30-yard field goal, 9:24. Lumberjacks 10–0. Drive: 9 plays, 23 yards, 2:53.
- SFA – Jaylen Jenkins 1-yard run (Carlos Alvarado kick), 2:26. Lumberjacks 17–0. Drive: 13 plays, 57 yards, 5:43.

Second quarter

- SFA – Clayton Wayland 9-yard pass from Sam Vidlak (Carlos Alvarado kick), 10:24. Lumberjacks 24–0. Drive: 13 plays, 96 yards, 4:27.
- SFA – Carlos Alvarado 29-yard field goal, 0:00. Lumberjacks 27–0. Drive: 16 plays, 57 yards, 7:09.

Third quarter

- RGV – Brysen Gardner 38-yard field goal, 7:53. Lumberjacks 27–3. Drive: 13 plays, 54 yards, 7:07.
- SFA – Kylon Harris 6-yard pass from Sam Vidlak (Carlos Alvarado kick), 3:45. Lumberjacks 34–3. Drive: 10 plays, 47 yards, 4:08.
- RGV – Tony Diaz 2-yard pass from Eddie Lee Marburger (Brysen Gardner kick), 0:00. Lumberjacks 34–10. Drive: 11 plays, 96 yards, 3:40.

Fourth quarter

- SFA – Clayton Wayland 10-yard pass from Sam Vidlak (Carlos Alvarado kick), 7:14. Lumberjacks 41–10. Drive: 19 plays, 96 yards, 7:40.
- RGV – Aidan Jakobsohn 6-yard run (Brysen Gardner kick), 2:20. Lumberjacks 41–17. Drive: 7 plays, 56 yards, 2:39.

Statistics	RGV	SFA
First downs	15	27
Total yards	215	448
Rushing yards	100	183
Passing yards	115	265
Turnovers	2	0
Time of possession	21:55	38:05

Team	Category	Player	Statistics
UT Rio Grande Valley	Passing	Eddie Lee Marburger	16/24, 115 yards, TD, 2 INT
UT Rio Grande Valley	Rushing	Aidan Jakobsohn	4 carries, 49 yards, TD
UT Rio Grande Valley	Receiving	Tony Diaz	6 receptions, 62 yards, TD
Stephen F. Austin	Passing	Sam Vidlak	25/32, 203 yards, 2 TD
Stephen F. Austin	Rushing	Jerrell Wimbley	11 carries, 87 yards
Stephen F. Austin	Receiving	Blaine Green	5 receptions, 68 yards

=== at Houston Christian ===
No. 17 Stephen F. Austin Lumberjacks (7–2) at Houston Christian Huskies (2–7) – Game summary

Quarter	1	2	3	4	Total
No. 17 Lumberjacks	15	14	14	7	50
Huskies	0	3	0	0	3

at Husky Stadium, Houston, Texas

- Date: November 8
- Game time: 2:00 PM CST
- Game weather: Sunny
- Game attendance: 1,859
- Referee: Craig Hesler
- TV: ESPN+

Statistics	SFA	HCU
First downs		
Plays–yards		
Rushes–yards		
Passing yards		
Turnovers		
Time of possession		

Team	Category	Player	Statistics
Stephen F. Austin	Passing		
Stephen F. Austin	Rushing		
Stephen F. Austin	Receiving		
Houston Christian	Passing		
Houston Christian	Rushing		
Houston Christian	Receiving		

=== No. 19 Lamar ===
No. 19 Lamar Cardinals (8–2) at No. 15 Stephen F. Austin Lumberjacks (8–2) – Game summary

Quarter	1	2	3	4	Total
No. 19 Cardinals	0	7	0	8	15
No. 15 Lumberjacks	10	3	10	3	26

at Homer Bryce Stadium, Nacogdoches, Texas

- Date: November 15
- Game time: 6:00 PM CST
- Game weather: Sunny
- Game attendance: 10,025
- Referee: James Brookhart
- TV: ESPN+

Statistics	LAM	SFA
First downs		
Total yards		
Rushing yards		
Passing yards		
Turnovers		
Time of possession		

Team	Category	Player	Statistics
Lamar	Passing		
Lamar	Rushing		
Lamar	Receiving		
Stephen F. Austin	Passing		
Stephen F. Austin	Rushing		
Stephen F. Austin	Receiving		

=== at Northwestern State (Chief Caddo) ===
No. 14 Stephen F. Austin Lumberjacks (9–2) at Northwestern State Demons (1–10) – Game summary

Quarter	1	2	3	4	Total
No. 14 Lumberjacks	20	28	7	7	62
Demons	0	0	7	7	14

at Harry Turpin Stadium, Natchitoches, Louisiana

- Date: November 20
- Game time: 6:30 PM CST
- Game weather: Sunny, 74 °F (23 °C)
- Game attendance: 4,285
- Referee: Craig Helser
- TV announcers (ESPN+): Patrick Netherton (play-by-play), Gary Reasons (analyst) and Jason Pugh (sideline)

Game information
First quarter
- SFA – Bugs Mortimer 79-yard punt return (Carlos Alvarado kick), 13:21. Lumberjacks 7–0.
- SFA – Derrick Bohler 26-yard pass from Sam Vidlak (run failed), 8:16. Lumberjacks 13–0. Drive: 5 plays, 59 yards, 1:41.
- SFA – Kylon Harris 65-yard pass from Sam Vidlak (Carlos Alvarado kick), 4:40. Lumberjacks 20–0. Drive: 3 plays, 75 yards, 0:56.

Second quarter

- SFA – Isaiah Davis 10-yard pass from Sam Vidlak (Carlos Alvarado kick), 13:49. Lumberjacks 27–0. Drive: 7 plays, 80 yards, 2:39.
- SFA – Jaylen Jenkins 18-yard run (Carlos Alvarado kick), 10:14. Lumberjacks 34–0. Drive: 4 plays, 68 yards, 1:06.
- SFA – Jaylen Jenkins 2-yard run (Carlos Alvarado kick), 5:03. Lumberjacks 41–0. Drive: 9 plays, 67 yards, 2:59.
- SFA – Richard Reese 9-yard run (Carlos Alvarado kick), 2:17. Lumberjacks 48–0. Drive: 3 plays, 54 yards, 1:07.

Third quarter

- SFA – Derrick Bohler 13-yard pass from Bryson Broadway (Carlos Alvarado kick), 7:20. Lumberjacks 55–0. Drive: 9 plays, 76 yards, 3:38.
- NWST – Camryn Davis 8-yard pass from Eli Anderson (Grayson Lytton kick), 2:55. Lumberjacks 55–7. Drive: 8 plays, 75 yards, 4:25.

Fourth quarter

- SFA – Jaylen Jenkins 1-yard run (Carlos Alvarado kick), 10:13. Lumberjacks 62–7. Drive: 15 plays, 75 yards, 7:42.
- NWST – Ty Moore 5-yard pass from Eli Anderson (Grayson Lytton kick), 4:25. Lumberjacks 62–14. Drive: 11 plays, 81 yards, 5:43.

Statistics	SFA	NWST
First downs	34	17
Plays–yards	64–607	64–307
Rushes–yards	42–320	41–146
Passing yards	287	161
Turnovers	0	0
Time of possession	26:09	33:51

Team	Category	Player	Statistics
Stephen F. Austin	Passing	Sam Vidlak	9/10, 207 yards, 3 TD
Stephen F. Austin	Rushing	Richard Reese	14 rushes, 115 yards, TD
Stephen F. Austin	Receiving	Kylon Harris	4 receptions, 135 yards, TD
Northwestern State	Passing	Eli Anderson	11/16, 150 yards, 2 TD
Northwestern State	Rushing	Jeremiah James	10 rushes, 68 yards
Northwestern State	Receiving	Brendan Webb	2 receptions, 38 yards

=== No. 13 Abilene Christian (NCAA Division I Second Round) ===
No. 10 Stephen F. Austin Lumberjacks (10-2) at No. 13 Abilene Christian Wildcats (9-4) – Game summary

Quarter	1	2	3	4	Total
No. 13 Wildcats	3	14	10	7	34
No. 10 Lumberjacks	7	10	7	17	41

at Homer Bryce Stadium, Nacogdoches, Texas

- Date: December 6
- Game time: 1:00 PM CDT
- TV: ESPN+

Statistics	ACU	SFA
First downs	21	23
Total yards	419	502
Rushing yards	211	145
Passing yards	208	357
Turnovers	1	0
Time of possession	34:00	26:00

Team	Category	Player	Statistics
Stephen F. Austin	Passing	Sam Vidlak #15	26/35, 357 yds, 3 TD
Stephen F. Austin	Rushing	Jerrell Wimbley #10	18 car, 52 yds, 2 TD
Stephen F. Austin	Receiving	Kylon Harris #4	11 rec, 183 yds, 1 TD
Abilene Christian	Passing	Stone Earle #4	19/36, 206 yds, 1 INT
Abilene Christian	Rushing	Jordon Vaughn #26	10 car, 100 yds, 3 TD
Abilene Christian	Receiving	Javon Gipson #7	6 rec, 72 yds

=== No. 2 Montana State (NCAA Division I Quarterfinals) ===
2025 NCAA Division I FCS Playoffs Quarterfinal
No. 10 (7) Stephen F. Austin Lumberjacks (11–2) at No. 2 (2) Montana State Bobcats (11–2) – Game summary

Quarter	1	2	3	4	Total
No. 10 (7) Lumberjacks	0	8	13	7	28
No. 2 (2) Bobcats	7	17	10	10	44

at Bobcat Stadium, Bozeman, Montana

- Date: December 13
- Game time: 1:00 PM CDT
- Game weather: Sunny, 38 °F (3 °C)
- Game attendance: 19,807
- Referee: Jason Berg
- TV announcers (ESPN): Clay Matvick (play by play), Chase Daniel (analyst) and Morgan Uber (sideline reporter)

Game information

First quarter

- MTST – Adam Jones 1-yard run (Myles Sansted kick), 5:13. Bobcats 7–0. Drive: 10 plays, 65 yards, 5:35.

Second quarter

- MTST – Adam Jones 21-yard pass from Justin Lamson (Myles Sansted kick), 15:00. Bobcats 14–0. Drive: 9 plays, 57 yards, 4:04.
- MTST – Myles Sansted 47-yard field goal, 1:50. Bobcats 17–0. Drive: 6 plays, 14 yards, 2:33.
- MTST – Luvens Valcin 3-yard pass from Justin Lamson (Myles Sansted kick), 1:33. Bobcats 24–0. Drive: 2 plays, 18 yards, 0:08.
- SFA – Clayton Wayland 11-yard pass from Sam Vidlak (Sam Vidlak pass to Clayton Wayland), 0:11. Bobcats 24–8. Drive: 6 plays, 75 yards, 1:22.

Third quarter

- SFA – Jaylen Jenkins 5-yard run (pass failed), 9:04. Bobcats 24–14. Drive: 14 plays, 76 yards, 5:56.
- MTST – Myles Sansted 36-yard field goal, 6:07. Bobcats 27–14. Drive: 6 plays, 45 yards, 2:51.
- MTST – Justin Lamson 5-yard run (Myles Sansted kick), 3:04. Bobcats 34–14. Drive: 6 plays, 66 yards, 2:39.
- SFA – Jaylen Jenkins 6-yard run (Carlos Alvarado kick), 0:16. Bobcats 34–21. Drive: 8 plays, 87 yards, 2:48.

Fourth quarter

- MTST – Adam Jones 16-yard run (Myles Sansted kick), 14:36. Bobcats 41–21. Drive: 3 plays, 69 yards, 0:40.
- SFA – Gavin Rutherford 2-yard run (Carlos Alvarado kick), 10:05. Bobcats 41–28. Drive: 12 plays, 77 yards, 4:31.
- MTST – Myles Sansted 23-yard field goal, 1:52. Bobcats 44–28. Drive: 13 plays, 69 yards, 8:13.

Statistics	SFA	MTST
First downs	22	25
Plays–yards	72–344	68–473
Rushes–yards	29–102	42–227
Passing yards	242	246
Passing: Comp–Att–Int	26–43–1	20–26–1
Turnovers	3	1
Time of possession	24:32	35:28

Team	Category	Player	Statistics
Stephen F. Austin	Passing	Sam Vidlak	26/43, 242 yards, TD, INT
Stephen F. Austin	Rushing	Jerrell Wimbley	11 carries, 75 yards
Stephen F. Austin	Receiving	Kylon Harris	11 receptions, 85 yards
Montana State	Passing	Justin Lamson	20/26, 246 yards, 2 TD, INT
Montana State	Rushing	Adam Jones	9 carries, 114 yards, 2 TD
Montana State	Receiving	Dane Steel	3 receptions, 68 yards
