= 2025 Florida State Seminoles football team =

American college team

2025 Florida State Seminoles football
- Conference: Atlantic Coast Conference
- Record: 5–7 (2–6 ACC)
- Head coach: Mike Norvell (6th season)
- Offensive coordinator: Gus Malzahn (1st season)
- Offensive scheme: Spread option
- Defensive coordinator: Tony White (1st season)
- Base defense: 3–3–5
- Home stadium: Doak Campbell Stadium

2025 Atlantic Coast Conference football standings
	Conf.			Overall
Team	W		L	W		L
No. 16 Virginia y	7	–	1	11	–	3
Duke y$	6	–	2	9	–	5
No. 2 Miami (FL) ^	6	–	2	13	–	3
Georgia Tech	6	–	2	9	–	4
SMU	6	–	2	9	–	4
Pittsburgh	6	–	2	8	–	5
Louisville	4	–	4	9	–	4
Wake Forest	4	–	4	9	–	4
NC State	4	–	4	8	–	5
California	4	–	4	7	–	6
Clemson	4	–	4	7	–	6
Stanford	3	–	5	4	–	8
Florida State	2	–	6	5	–	7
Virginia Tech	2	–	6	3	–	9
North Carolina	2	–	6	4	–	8
Boston College	1	–	7	2	–	10
Syracuse	1	–	7	3	–	9
Championship: Duke 27, Virginia 20^{OT}
^ – College Football Playoff participant; $ – Conference champion; y – Championship game participant; As of October 26, 2026; Rankings from AP Poll

The 2025 Florida State Seminoles football team represented Florida State University in the Atlantic Coast Conference during the 2025 NCAA Division I FBS football season, entering the season after arguably the worst season in the program's history. The Seminoles were led by Mike Norvell, who was in his sixth year as their head coach. The Seminoles played their home games at Doak Campbell Stadium, located in Tallahassee, Florida.

Florida State began the season with an upset win over the eighth-ranked Alabama Crimson Tide as a double digit underdog. The Seminoles set the school record for largest margin of victory with a win over the East Texas A&M Lions, matching the previous year's win total, and reaching the top 10 in the polls, going on to surpass it with a win over the Kent State Golden Flashes, setting new school records for total yards, rushing yards, rushing touchdowns, and first downs in a single game. However, the Seminoles cooled off, suffering four consecutive defeats, starting a season 0–4 in conference play for the first time, first in overtime to the Virginia Cavaliers, the conference opener, losing the Jefferson–Eppes Trophy, to their rival, the Miami Hurricanes, the Pittsburgh Panthers, the fourth consecutive home conference loss for the program, and then the Stanford Cardinal, in the first meeting between the schools and the ninth consecutive conference loss for the program, dating back to the previous season. Following a bye week, the Seminoles got their first conference victory of the season with a homecoming win over the Wake Forest Demon Deacons before losing again on the road to the conference rival Clemson Tigers.

On senior day, the Seminoles got their second conference win over the Virginia Tech Hokies. In their final conference game of the season, Florida State lost to the NC State Wolfpack, the tenth consecutive road defeat for the Seminoles, dating back to the 2023 Orange Bowl. As a result, the Seminoles finished with a losing record in the ACC for the second straight season; despite this, the university announced that a decision had been made for Norvell to return as head coach for the 2026 season. The Seminoles ended their season with a loss to their rival Florida Gators, compiling a losing record for the fourth time in the last six seasons, finishing winless on the road for the second consecutive season, and leaving them ineligible for a bowl game. Due to a lack of available bowl teams, Florida State was offered a spot in the Birmingham Bowl due to a high academic progress rate score but the school turned down the bid. Wide receiver Duce Robinson became the first Seminole receiver to total 1,000 yards in a season since 2019 and the program's first Academic All-American in thirteen years. Darrell Jackson, Jr. would go on to be selected in the NFL draft.

Following the season, defensive backs coach Patrick Surtain, Sr. was dismissed from the coaching staff, running backs coach David Johnson departed for the same role at Arkansas, defensive analyst Zach Arnett was hired as defensive coordinator for Mississippi State, quarterbacks coach Tony Tokarz was hired as offensive coordinator at Buffalo, special teams and linebackers coach John Papuchis left for an assistant role at Missouri and general manager Darrick Yray took on the general manager role with UCLA. Tony White was announced to be returning as defensive coordinator while Gus Malzahn announced his retirement with Tim Harris, Jr. promoting to offensive coordinator and Norvell taking over play calling duties. Nick Williams was hired from Syracuse as edges coach and pass rush specialist, Kam Martin was hired from Tulsa as running backs coach, Michigan State coach Blue Adams was hired as cornerbacks coach, UNLV coach Adam Scheier was hired as the new special teams coordinator, Austin Tucker was promoted to quarterbacks coach, and former player Ernie Sims was promoted to linebackers coach for the 2026 season. Brady White, who played for Norvell at Memphis, was added to the coaching staff as well. Duke director of player personnel John Garrett was named as the program's new general manager, now reporting directly to the university's athletic director Michael Alford, Taylor Edwards was brought on as the executive director of player acquisitions, Mitch Ciombor was brought on as director of high school scouting, and former staffer Gabe Fertitta returned as director of football strategy.

The Florida State Seminoles drew an average home attendance of 65,876.

== Offseason ==
=== 2025 NFL draft ===
Round	Pick	Player	Position	Team
3	73	Azareye'h Thomas	CB	New York Jets
4	137	Joshua Farmer	DT	New England Patriots

=== Transfers ===
==== Outgoing ====
Player	Position	Destination
Jalen Brown	WR	Arkansas
Trever Jackson	QB	Arkansas
D'Nas White	DL	Catawba
Hykeem Williams	WR	Colorado
Lamont Green Jr.	DE	FIU
Dante Anderson	DE	FIU
Harold Stubbs IV	S	Florida
Xavier Perkins	DE	Florida A&M
Weston Edwards	LS	Houston
Tomiwa Durojaiye	DL	Illinois
Aaron Hester	DE	Liberty
Patrick Payton	DE	LSU
Destyn Hill	WR	LSU
DD Holmes	DL	Maryland
Jordan Scott	WR	Maryland
DeMarco Ward	LB	Memphis
Omarion Cooper	S	Memphis
Darion Williamson	WR	Miami (OH)
Grady Kelly	DL	Michigan State
Luke Kromenhoek	QB	Mississippi State
Jaylen Early	OL	Missouri
Timir Hickman-Collins	LB	North Carolina
Marvin Jones Jr.	DE	Oklahoma
Malik Benson	WR	Oregon
Deuce Spann	WR	Pittsburgh
Shawn Murphy	LB	South Carolina
Jerrale Powers	TE	Stephen F. Austin
TJ Ferguson	OL	Syracuse
Brian Courtney	TE	Tennessee Tech
Byron Turner Jr.	DE	Tulsa
Julian Armella	OL	UCLA
Jackson West	TE	Western Kentucky
Malakai Menzer	DL	Unknown
Dylan McNamara	QB	Unknown

==== Incoming ====
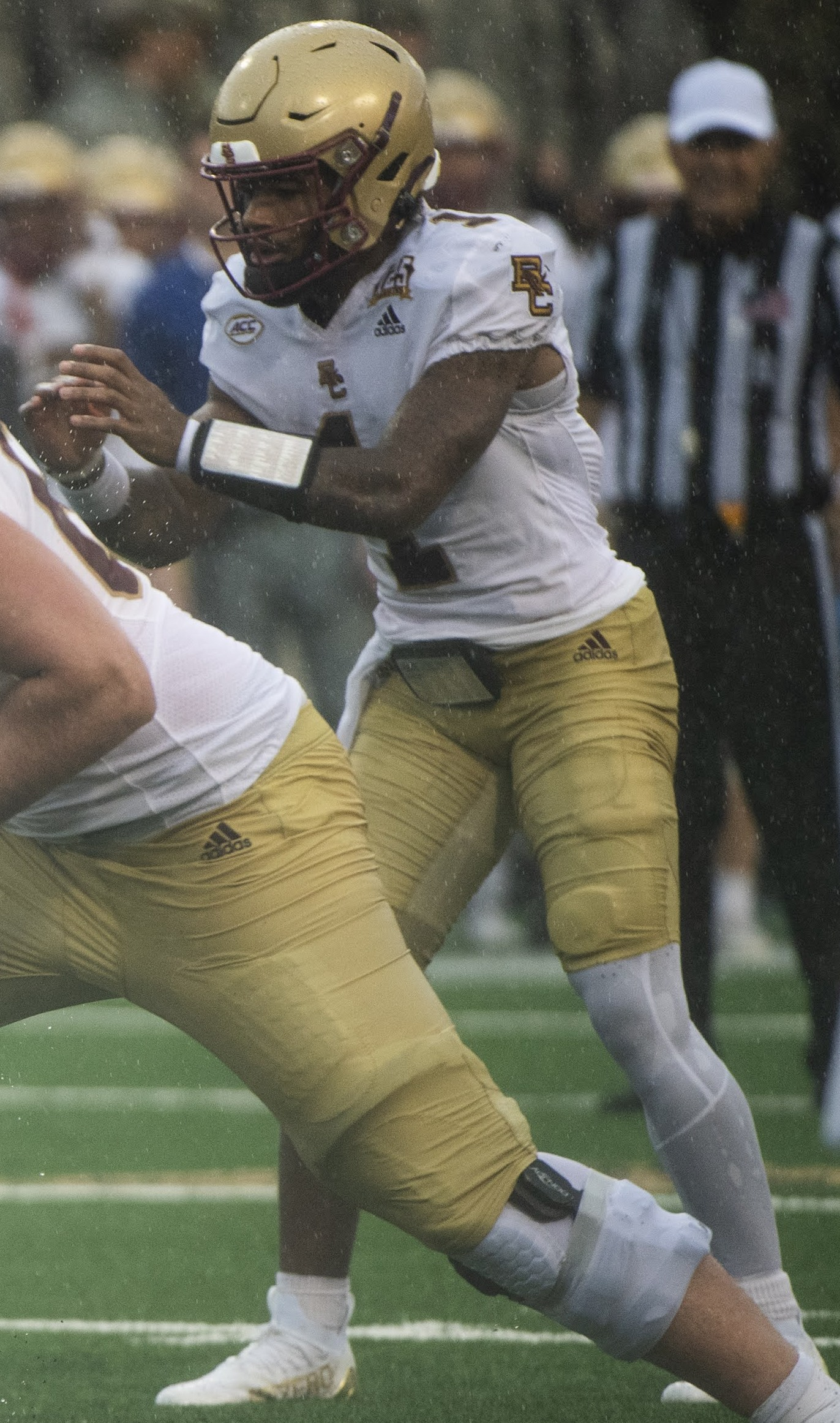
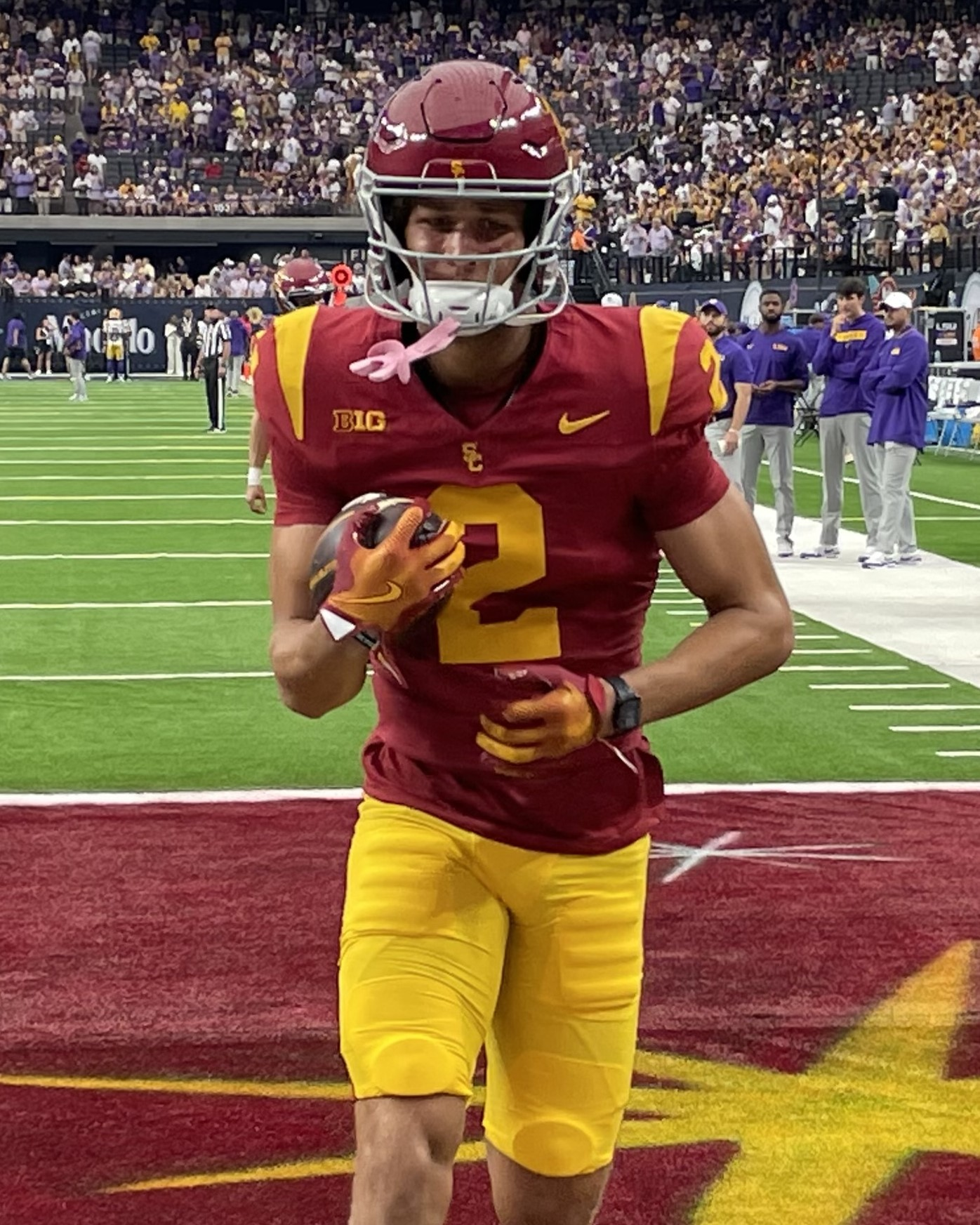
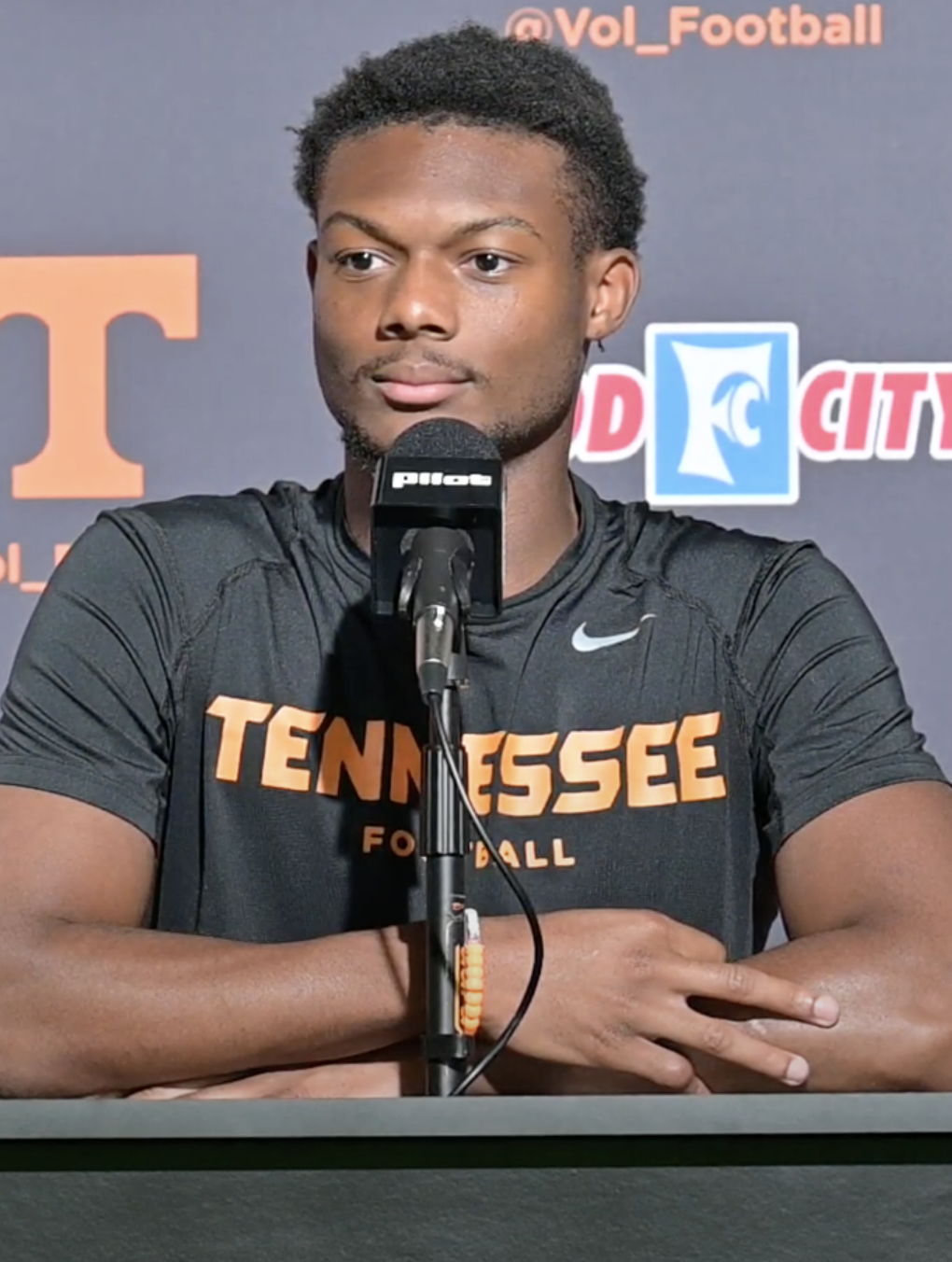
Quarterback Tommy Castellanos and wide receivers Duce Robinson and Squirrel White were notable incoming transfers.

Player	Position	Previous school
Markeston Douglas	TE	Arizona State
Tommy Castellanos	QB	Boston College
Deamontae Diggs	DL	Coastal Carolina
Jaylen King	QB	East Tennessee State
Jeremiah Wilson	DB	Houston
Elijah Herring	LB	Memphis
James Williams	DE	Nebraska
Stefon Thompson	LB	Nebraska
Gavin Blackwell	WR	North Carolina
Caleb LaVallee	LB	North Carolina
Gavin Sawchuk	RB	Oklahoma
Micah Pettus	OL	Ole Miss
Ja'Elyne Matthews	OL	Rutgers
Jayson Jenkins	DL	Tennessee
Squirrel White	WR	Tennessee
Adrian Medley	OL	UCF
Randy Pittman Jr.	TE	UCF
Duce Robinson	WR	USC
Jarvis Boatwright Jr.	S	USC
Josh Raymond	OL	Vanderbilt
Gunnar Hansen	OL	Vanderbilt
Luke Petitbon	OL	Wake Forest
Deante McCray	DL	Western Kentucky

== Schedule ==
Date	Time	Opponent	Rank	Site	TV	Result	Attendance
August 30	3:30 p.m.	No. 8 Alabama*		Doak Campbell Stadium; Tallahassee, FL	ABC	W 31–17	67,277
September 6	12:00 p.m.	East Texas A&M*	No. 14	Doak Campbell Stadium; Tallahassee, FL	ACCN	W 77–3	65,430
September 20	3:30 p.m.	Kent State*	No. 7	Doak Campbell Stadium; Tallahassee, FL	ACCN	W 66–10	67,277
September 26	7:00 p.m.	at Virginia	No. 8	Scott Stadium; Charlottesville, VA (Jefferson–Eppes Trophy)	ESPN	L 38–46 ^{2OT}	50,107
October 4	7:30 p.m.	No. 3 Miami (FL)	No. 18	Doak Campbell Stadium; Tallahassee, FL (rivalry)	ABC	L 22–28	67,277
October 11	12:00 p.m.	Pittsburgh	No. 25	Doak Campbell Stadium; Tallahassee, FL	ESPN	L 31–34	65,256
October 18	10:30 p.m.	at Stanford		Stanford Stadium; Stanford, CA	ESPN	L 13–20	26,470
November 1	7:30 p.m.	Wake Forest^{†}		Doak Campbell Stadium; Tallahassee, FL	ACCN	W 42–7	63,677
November 8	7:00 p.m.	at Clemson		Memorial Stadium; Clemson, SC (rivalry)	ACCN	L 10–24	81,500
November 15	7:30 p.m.	Virginia Tech		Doak Campbell Stadium; Tallahassee, FL	ACCN	W 34–14	64,937
November 21	8:00 p.m.	at NC State		Carter–Finley Stadium; Raleigh, NC	ESPN	L 11–21	56,919
November 29	4:30 p.m.	at Florida*		Ben Hill Griffin Stadium; Gainesville, FL (rivalry)	ESPN2	L 21–40	90,007
*Non-conference game; ^{†}Homecoming; Rankings from AP Poll - released prior to game; All times are in Eastern time; Source:

== Rankings ==
Ranking movements Legend: ██ Increase in ranking ██ Decrease in ranking — = Not ranked RV = Received votes
	Week																
Poll	Pre	1	2	3	4	5	6	7	8	9	10	11	12	13	14	15	Final
AP	RV	14	10	7	8	18	25	—	—	—	—	—	—	—	—	—	—
Coaches	RV	19	12	9	8	19	RV	—	—	—	—	—	—	—	—	—	—
CFP	Not released										—	—	—	—	—	—	Not released

== Game summaries ==
=== vs No. 8 Alabama ===
No. 8 Alabama Crimson Tide (0–0) at Florida State Seminoles (0–0) – Game summary

Quarter	1	2	3	4	Total
No. 8 Crimson Tide	7	0	3	7	17
Seminoles	7	10	7	7	31

at Doak Campbell Stadium • Tallahassee, Florida

- Date: August 30
- Game time: 3:30 p.m.
- Game weather: Cloudy • Temperature: 87 °F (31 °C) • Wind: N at 6 miles per hour (9.7 km/h)
- Game attendance: 67,277
- Referee: Mike Roche
- TV announcers (ABC): Joe Tessitore (play-by-play), Jesse Palmer (analyst), and Katie George (sideline reporter)
- Box score, Recap

Game information

First quarter

- (6:10) ALA – Josh Cuevas 2-yard pass from Ty Simpson, Conor Talty kick (Drive: 16 plays, 75 yards, 8:50; Alabama 7–0)
- (3:04) FSU – Tommy Castellanos 9-yard run, Jake Weinberg kick (Drive: 7 plays, 75 yards, 3:06; Tied 7–7)

Second quarter

- (9:13) FSU – Micahi Danzy 32-yard run, Jake Weinberg kick (Drive: 8 plays, 65 yards, 3:59; Florida State 14–7)
- (3:44) FSU – Jake Weinberg 45-yard field goal (Drive: 9 plays, 52 yards, 4:39; Florida State 17–7)

Third quarter

- (9:45) FSU – Caziah Holmes 4-yard run, Jake Weinberg kick (Drive: 2 plays, 68 yards, 0:37; Florida State 24–7)
- (5:59) ALA – Conor Talty 40-yard field goal (Drive: 12 plays, 53 yards, 3:46; Florida State 24–10)

Fourth quarter

- (11:00) ALA – Rico Scott 6-yard pass from Ty Simpson, Conor Talty kick (Drive: 7 plays, 63 yards, 3:16; Florida State 24–17)
- (7:17) FSU – Gavin Sawchuk 14-yard run, Jake Weinberg kick (Drive: 10 plays, 75 yards, 3:43; Florida State 31–17)

Statistics	ALA	FSU
First downs	18	20
Plays–yards	72–341	63–382
Rushes–yards	29–87	46–230
Passing yards	254	152
Passing: comp–att–int	23–43–0	9–14–0
Turnovers	0	1
Time of possession	29:38	30:22

Team	Category	Player	Statistics
Alabama	Passing	Ty Simpson	23/43, 254 yards, 2 TD
Alabama	Rushing	Kevin Riley	5 carries, 31 yards
Alabama	Receiving	Germie Bernard	8 receptions, 146 yards
Florida State	Passing	Tommy Castellanos	9/14, 152 yards
Florida State	Rushing	Tommy Castellanos	16 carries, 78 yards, TD
Florida State	Receiving	Jaylin Lucas	2 receptions, 66 yards

=== vs East Texas A&M (FCS) ===
East Texas A&M Lions (FCS) (0–1) at No. 14 Florida State Seminoles (1–0) – Game summary

Quarter	1	2	3	4	Total
Lions (FCS)	0	0	0	3	3
No. 14 Seminoles	21	28	21	7	77

at Doak Campbell Stadium • Tallahassee, Florida

- Date: September 6
- Game time: 12:00 p.m.
- Game weather: Sunny • Temperature: 86 °F (30 °C) • Wind: E at 5 miles per hour (8.0 km/h)
- Game attendance: 65,430
- Referee: Darryl DeBerry
- TV announcers (ACCN): Jorge Sedano (play-by-play), Rodney McLeod (analyst), and Victoria Arlen (sideline reporter)
- Box score, Recap

Game information

First quarter

- (8:14) FSU – Gavin Sawchuk 1-yard run, Jake Weinberg kick (Drive: 12 plays, 78 yards, 4:38; Florida State 7–0)
- (4:48) FSU – Duce Robinson 82-yard pass from Tommy Castellanos, Jake Weinberg kick (Drive: 1 play, 82 yards, 0:11; Florida State 14–0)
- (2:18) FSU – Duce Robinson 42-yard pass from Tommy Castellanos, Jake Weinberg kick (Drive: 4 plays, 53 yards, 0:52; Florida State 21–0)

Second quarter

- (14:57) FSU – Gavin Sawchuk 1-yard run, Jake Weinberg kick (Drive: 6 plays, 15 yards, 2:04; Florida State 28–0)
- (11:37) FSU – Gavin Sawchuk 53-yard pass from Tommy Castellanos, Jake Weinberg kick (Drive: 4 plays, 61 yards, 1:09; Florida State 35–0)
- (7:21) FSU – Micahi Danzy 53-yard run, Jake Weinberg kick (Drive: 4 plays, 72 yards, 1:33; Florida State 42–0)
- (0:48) FSU – Jayvan Boggs 3-yard pass from Kevin Sperry, Jake Weinberg kick (Drive: 10 plays, 65 yards, 5:10; Florida State 49–0)

Third quarter

- (12:06) FSU – Amaree Williams 35-yard pass from Brock Glenn, Jake Weinberg kick (Drive: 6 plays, 76 yards, 2:47; Florida State 56–0)
- (8:57) FSU – Ousmane Kromah 43-yard pass from Kevin Sperry, Jake Weinberg kick (Drive: 3 plays, 48 yards, 1:15; Florida State 63–0)
- (2:13) FSU – Samuel Singleton Jr. 53-yard run, Jake Weinberg kick (Drive: 4 plays, 98 yards, 2:13; Florida State 70–0)

Fourth quarter

- (9:30) ETAM – Ozlo Rigby 21-yard field goal (Drive: 7 plays, 49 yards, 3:29; Florida State 70–3)
- (1:54) FSU – Zay Parks 13-yard run, Brunno Reus kick (Drive: 12 plays, 80 yards, 7:32; Florida State 77–3)

Statistics	ETAM	FSU
First downs	9	29
Plays–yards	49–197	71–729
Rushes–yards	35–105	51–361
Passing yards	92	368
Passing: comp–att–int	7–13–2	16–20–0
Turnovers	2	1
Time of possession	28:01	31:59

Team	Category	Player	Statistics
East Texas A&M	Passing	Jack Jacobs	2/3, 43 yards
East Texas A&M	Rushing	KJ Shankle	8 carries, 26 yards
East Texas A&M	Receiving	Christian Jourdain	3 receptions, 28 yards
Florida State	Passing	Tommy Castellanos	8/11, 237 yards, 3 TD
Florida State	Rushing	Samuel Singleton Jr.	4 carries, 82 yards, TD
Florida State	Receiving	Duce Robinson	5 receptions, 173 yards, 2 TD

=== vs Kent State ===
Kent State Golden Flashes (1–2) at No. 7 Florida State Seminoles (2–0) – Game summary

Quarter	1	2	3	4	Total
Golden Flashes	7	0	0	3	10
No. 7 Seminoles	35	10	14	7	66

at Doak Campbell Stadium • Tallahassee, Florida

- Date: September 20
- Game time: 3:30 p.m.
- Game weather: Cloudy • Temperature: 94 °F (34 °C) • Wind: SE at 6 miles per hour (9.7 km/h)
- Game attendance: 67,277
- Referee: Jon Noli
- TV announcers (ACCN): Jorge Sedano (play-by-play), Rodney McLeod (analyst), and Victoria Arlen (sideline reporter)
- Box score, Recap

Game information

First quarter

- (13:39) FSU – Gavin Sawchuk 4-yard run, Jake Weinberg kick (Drive: 4 plays, 65 yards, 1:21; Florida State 7–0)
- (8:19) FSU – Tommy Castellanos 12-yard run, Jake Weinberg kick (Drive: 8 plays, 95 yards, 3:23; Florida State 14–0)
- (8:08) KSU - DaShawn Martin 75-yard pass from Dru DeShields, Will Hryszko kick (Drive: 1 play, 75 yards, 0:11; Florida State 14–7)
- (7:33) FSU - Tommy Castellanos 10-yard run, Jake Weinberg kick (Drive: 2 plays, 75 yards, 0:35; Florida State 21–7)
- (3:18) FSU - Micahi Danzy 64-yard run, Jake Weinberg kick (Drive: 7 plays, 84 yards, 2:47; Florida State 28–7)
- (0:00) FSU - Gavin Sawchuk 2-yard run, Jake Weinberg kick (Drive: 4 plays, 47 yards, 1:14; Florida State 35–7)

Second quarter

- (2:16) FSU - Samuel Singleton Jr. 15-yard run, Jake Weinberg kick (Drive: 9 plays, 73 yards, 4:11; Florida State 42–7)
- (0:00) FSU - Jake Weinberg 25-yard field goal (Drive: 6 plays, 47 yards, 0:35; Florida State 45–7)

Third quarter

- (10:04) FSU - Kam Davis 1-yard run, Jake Weinberg kick (Drive: 7 plays, 75 yards, 3:33; Florida State 52–7)
- (5:02) FSU - Landen Thomas 2-yard pass from Brock Glenn, Jake Weinberg kick (Drive: 10 plays, 58 yards, 4:02; Florida State 59–7)

Fourth quarter

- (12:41) KSU - Will Hryszko 38-yard field goal (Drive: 14 plays, 54 yards, 7:21; Florida State 59–10)
- (8:20) FSU - Samuel Singleton Jr. 37-yard run, Brunno Reus kick (Drive: 7 plays, 65 yards, 4:21; Florida State 66–10)

Statistics	KENT	FSU
First downs	12	37
Plays–yards	55–206	78–775
Rushes–yards	28–43	54–498
Passing yards	163	277
Passing: comp–att–int	13–27–1	16–24–1
Turnovers	1	1
Time of possession	25:29	34:31

Team	Category	Player	Statistics
Kent State	Passing	Dru DeShields	9/18, 129 yards, TD, INT
Kent State	Rushing	Gavin Garcia	14 carries, 40 yards
Kent State	Receiving	DaShawn Martin	3 receptions, 94 yards, TD
Florida State	Passing	Tommy Castellanos	10/13, 205 yards, INT
Florida State	Rushing	Gavin Sawchuk	11 carries, 97 yards, 2 TD
Florida State	Receiving	Micahi Danzy	2 receptions, 112 yards

=== at Virginia (Jefferson–Eppes Trophy) ===
No. 8 Florida State Seminoles (3–0) at Virginia Cavaliers (3–1) – Game summary

Quarter	1	2	3	4	OT	2OT	Total
No. 8 Seminoles	0	21	7	7	3	0	38
Cavaliers	7	14	7	7	3	8	46

at Scott Stadium • Charlottesville, Virginia

- Date: September 26
- Game time: 7:00 p.m.
- Game weather: Cloudy • Temperature: 77 °F (25 °C) • Wind: NE at 5 miles per hour (8.0 km/h)
- Game attendance: 50,107
- Referee: Nate Black
- TV announcers (ESPN): Bob Wischusen (play-by-play), Louis Riddick (analyst), and Kris Budden (sideline reporter)
- Box score, Recap

Game information

First quarter

- UVA - Sage Ennis 6-yard pass from Chandler Morris (Will Bettridge kick), 5:05. Cavaliers 7–0. Drive: 7 plays, 38 yards, 2:28.

Second quarter

- UVA - Chandler Morris 11-yard run (Will Bettridge kick), 9:43. Cavaliers 14–0. Drive: 15 plays, 81 yards, 7:04.
- FSU - Gavin Sawchuk 2-yard run (Jake Weinberg kick), 6:52. Cavaliers 14–7. Drive: 7 plays, 75 yards, 2:51.
- FSU - Randy Pittman Jr. 2-yard run (Jake Weinberg kick), 5:29. Tied 14–14. Drive: 4 plays, 27 yards, 1:11.
- FSU - Tommy Castellanos 4-yard run (Jake Weinberg kick), 2:32. Seminoles 21–14. Drive: 6 plays, 45 yards, 2:04.
- UVA - J'Mari Taylor 26-yard run (Will Bettridge kick), 0:48. Tied 21–21. Drive: 7 plays, 75 yards, 1:44.

Third quarter

- UVA - Chandler Morris 7-yard run (Will Bettridge kick), 3:45. Cavaliers 28–21. Drive: 12 plays, 74 yards, 6:13.
- FSU - Duce Robinson 4-yard pass from Randy Pittman (Jake Weinberg kick), 0:18. Tied 28–28. Drive: 7 plays, 75 yards, 3:27.

Fourth quarter

- UVA - Xavier Brown 15-yard pass from Chandler Morris (Will Bettridge kick), 7:20. Cavaliers 35–28. Drive: 16 plays, 75 yards, 7:58.
- FSU - Randy Pittman Jr. 11-yard pass from Tommy Castellanos (Jake Weinberg kick), 0:36. Tied 35–35. Drive: 8 plays, 67 yards, 1:42.

Overtime

- FSU - Jake Weinberg 36-yard field goal. Seminoles 38–35. Drive: 4 plays, 7 yards.
- UVA - Will Bettridge 39-yard field goal. Tied 38–38. Drive: 4 plays, 3 yards.

Double Overtime

- UVA - Chandler Morris 4-yard run (Chandler Morris–Trell Harris pass). Cavaliers 46–38. Drive: 4 plays, 25 yards.

Statistics	FSU	UVA
First downs	24	27
Plays–yards	81–514	84–440
Rushes–yards	48–256	48–211
Passing yards	258	229
Passing: comp–att–int	19–33–2	26–36–3
Turnovers	3	3
Time of possession	28:03	31:57

Team	Category	Player	Statistics
Florida State	Passing	Tommy Castellanos	18/32, 254 yards, TD, 2 INT
Florida State	Rushing	Tommy Castellanos	14 carries, 78 yards, TD
Florida State	Receiving	Duce Robinson	9 receptions, 147 yards, TD
Virginia	Passing	Chandler Morris	26/35, 229 yards, 2 TD, 3 INT
Virginia	Rushing	J'Mari Taylor	27 carries, 99 yards, TD
Virginia	Receiving	Jahmal Edrine	5 receptions, 45 yards

=== vs No. 3 Miami (FL) (rivalry, Florida Cup) ===
No. 3 Miami Hurricanes (4–0) at No. 18 Florida State Seminoles (3–1) – Game summary

Quarter	1	2	3	4	Total
No. 3 Hurricanes	7	7	14	0	28
No. 18 Seminoles	3	0	0	19	22

at Doak Campbell Stadium • Tallahassee, Florida

- Date: October 4
- Game time: 7:30 p.m.
- Game weather: Cloudy • Temperature: 83 °F (28 °C) • Wind: NE at 10 mph
- Game attendance: 67,277
- Referee: Jerry Magallanes
- TV announcers (ABC): Chris Fowler (play-by-play), Kirk Herbstreit (analyst), and Holly Rowe (sideline reporter)
- Box score, Recap

Game information

First quarter

- (10:02) FSU – Jake Weinberg 23-yard field goal (Drive: 11 plays, 70 yards, 4:58; Florida State 3–0)
- (0:50) MIA – CJ Daniels 4-yard pass from Carson Beck, Carter Davis kick (Drive: 9 plays, 79 yards, 4:51; Miami 7–3)

Second quarter

- (11:25) MIA – Malachi Toney 44-yard pass from Carson Beck, Carter Davis kick (Drive: 1 play, 44 yards, 0:08; Miami 14–3)

Third quarter

- (9:09) MIA – Malachi Toney 40-yard pass from Carson Beck, Carter Davis kick (Drive: 10 plays, 75 yards, 5:51; Miami 21–3)
- (3:53) MIA – CJ Daniels 24-yard pass from Carson Beck, Carter Davis kick (Drive: 8 plays, 80 yards, 4:03; Miami 28–3)

Fourth quarter

- (10:04) FSU – Lawayne McCoy 8-yard pass from Tommy Castellanos, Micah Danzy two-point run (Drive: 10 plays, 47 yards, 2:56; Miami 28–11)
- (3:22) FSU – Randy Pittman Jr. 6-yard pass from Tommy Castellanos, Lawayne McCoy-Tommy Castellanos two-point pass (Drive: 19 plays, 96 yards, 5:10; Miami 28–19)
- (0:20) FSU – Jake Weinberg 35-yard field goal (Drive: 7 plays, 60 yards, 0:52; Miami 28–22)

Statistics	MIA	FSU
First downs	14	28
Plays–yards	59–338	83–404
Rushes–yards	32–98	38–132
Passing yards	240	272
Passing: comp–att–int	20–27–0	25–45–2
Turnovers	0	3
Time of possession	30:24	29:36

Team	Category	Player	Statistics
Miami (FL)	Passing	Carson Beck	20/27, 240 yards, 4 TD
Miami (FL)	Rushing	Mark Fletcher Jr.	12 carries, 41 yards
Miami (FL)	Receiving	Malachi Toney	7 receptions, 107 yards, 2 TD
Florida State	Passing	Tommy Castellanos	25/45, 272 yards, 2 TD, 2 INT
Florida State	Rushing	Tommy Castellanos	16 carries, 57 yards
Florida State	Receiving	Duce Robinson	6 receptions, 87 yards

=== vs Pittsburgh ===
Pittsburgh Panthers (3–2) at No. 25 Florida State Seminoles (3–2) – Game summary

Quarter	1	2	3	4	Total
Panthers	7	7	7	13	34
No. 25 Seminoles	7	14	3	7	31

at Doak Campbell Stadium • Tallahassee, Florida

- Date: October 11
- Game time: 12:00 p.m.
- Game weather: Cloudy • Temperature: 70 °F (21 °C) • Wind: NE at 10 mph
- Game attendance: 65,256
- Referee: Riley Johnson
- TV announcers (ESPN): Dave Pasch (play-by-play), Dusty Dvoracek (analyst), and Taylor McGregor (sideline reporter)
- Box score, Recap

Game information

First quarter

- (6:55) PITT - Ja'Kyrian Turner 10-yard run, Trey Butkowski kick (Drive: 15 plays, 75 yards, 8:05; Pittsburgh 7–0)
- (3:17) FSU - Caziah Holmes 1-yard run, Jake Weinberg kick (Drive: 8 plays, 65 yards, 3:38; Tied 7–7)

Second quarter

- (14:21) PITT - Desmond Reid 24-yard pass from Mason Heintschel, Trey Butkowski kick (Drive: 9 plays, 75 yards, 3:56; Pittsburgh 14–7)
- (4:20) FSU - Micahi Danzy 33-yard pass from Tommy Castellanos, Jake Weinberg kick (Drive: 6 plays, 62 yards, 2:35; Tied 14–14)
- (0:06) FSU - Landen Thomas 25-yard pass from Tommy Castellanos, Jake Weinberg kick (Drive: 7 plays, 88 yards, 1:20; Florida State 21–14)

Third quarter

- (10:15) PITT - Desmond Reid 16-yard pass from Mason Heintschel, Trey Butkowski kick (Drive: 7 plays, 85 yards, 3:05; Tied 21–21)
- (5:41) FSU - Jake Weinberg 34-yard field goal (Drive: 10 plays, 50 yards, 4:34; Florida State 24–21)

Fourth quarter

- (11:38) PITT - Trey Butkowski 28-yard field goal (Drive: 5 plays, 39 yards, 1:47; Tied 24–24)
- (7:15) PITT - Trey Butkowski 34-yard field goal (Drive: 6 plays, 54 yards, 2:58; Pittsburgh 27–24)
- (2:28) PITT - Ja'Kyrian Turner 3-yard run, Trey Butkowski kick (Drive: 8 plays, 73 yards, 3:50; Pittsburgh 34–24)
- (1:45) FSU - Micahi Danzy 58-yard pass from Tommy Castellanos, Jake Weinberg kick (Drive: 4 plays, 75 yards, 0:43; Pittsburgh 34–31)

Statistics	PITT	FSU
First downs	23	21
Plays–yards	71–476	63–415
Rushes–yards	42–155	40–170
Passing yards	321	245
Passing: comp–att–int	21–29–2	16–23–0
Turnovers	2	1
Time of possession	32:35	27:25

Team	Category	Player	Statistics
Pittsburgh	Passing	Mason Heintschel	21/29, 321 yards, 2 TD, 2 INT
Pittsburgh	Rushing	Mason Heintschel	16 carries, 64 yards
Pittsburgh	Receiving	Desmond Reid	8 receptions, 155 yards, 2 TD
Florida State	Passing	Tommy Castellanos	16/23, 245 yards, 3 TD
Florida State	Rushing	Gavin Sawchuk	14 carries, 71 yards
Florida State	Receiving	Micahi Danzy	7 receptions, 133 yards, 2 TD

=== at Stanford ===
Florida State Seminoles (3–3) at Stanford Cardinal (2–4) – Game summary

Quarter	1	2	3	4	Total
Seminoles	0	10	0	3	13
Cardinal	3	10	7	0	20

at Stanford Stadium • Stanford, California

- Date: October 18
- Game time: 10:30 p.m.
- Game weather: Sunny
- Game attendance: 26,470
- Referee: Darryl DeBerry
- TV announcers (ESPN): Roy Philpott (play-by-play), Sam Acho (analyst), and Taylor Davis (sideline reporter)
- Box score, Recap

Game information

First quarter

- (7:41) STAN – Emmet Kenney 32-yard field goal (Drive: 13 plays, 68 yards, 6:04; Stanford 3–0)

Second quarter

- (14:34) FSU – Jake Weinberg 39-yard field goal (Drive: 12 plays, 54 yards, 4:00; Tied 3–3)
- (9:13) STAN – CJ Williams 7-yard pass from Ben Gulbranson, Emmet Kenney kick (Drive: 11 plays, 75 yards, 5:21; Stanford 10–3)
- (2:53) STAN – Emmet Kenney 26-yard field goal (Drive: 6 plays, 24 yards, 2:37; Stanford 13–3)
- (0:40) FSU – Tommy Castellanos 8-yard run, Jake Weinberg kick (Drive: 10 plays, 75 yards, 2:12; Stanford 13–10)

Third quarter

- (3:02) STAN – Cole Tabb 1-yard run, Emmet Kenney kick (Drive: 13 plays, 94 yards, 7:03; Stanford 20–10)

Fourth quarter

- (9:21) FSU – Jake Weinberg 33-yard field goal (Drive: 9 plays, 44 yards, 3:43; Stanford 20–13)

Statistics	FSU	STAN
First downs	22	19
Plays–yards	78–444	67–293
Rushes–yards	43–133	42–132
Passing yards	311	161
Passing: comp–att–int	18–35–0	12–25–1
Turnovers	0	1
Time of possession	27:04	32:56

Team	Category	Player	Statistics
Florida State	Passing	Tommy Castellanos	14/28, 242 yards
Florida State	Rushing	Gavin Sawchuk	20 carries, 70 yards
Florida State	Receiving	Micahi Danzy	3 receptions, 106 yards
Stanford	Passing	Ben Gulbranson	6/13, 90 yards, TD, INT
Stanford	Rushing	Cole Tabb	28 carries, 118 yards, TD
Stanford	Receiving	Sam Roush	6 receptions, 63 yards

=== vs Wake Forest ===
Wake Forest Demon Deacons (5–2) at Florida State Seminoles (3–4) – Game summary

Quarter	1	2	3	4	Total
Demon Deacons	0	0	0	7	7
Seminoles	0	14	14	14	42

at Doak Campbell Stadium • Tallahassee, Florida

- Date: November 1
- Game time: 7:30 p.m.
- Game weather: Clear • Temperature: 63 °F (17 °C) • Wind: SE at 3 mph
- Game attendance: 63,677
- Referee: Riley Johnson
- TV announcers (ACCN): Jorge Sedano (play-by-play), Rodney McLeod (analyst), and Victoria Arlen (sideline reporter)
- Box score, Recap

Game information

First quarter

- No scoring plays.

Second quarter

- FSU - Tommy Castellanos 6-yard run (Jake Weinberg kick), 13:44. Seminoles 7–0. Drive: 6 plays, 80 yards, 3:05.
- FSU – Samuel Singleton Jr. 10-yard run (Jake Weinberg kick), 0:57. Seminoles 14–0. Drive: 7 plays, 72 yards, 2:29.

Third quarter

- FSU – Gavin Sawchuk 1-yard run (Jake Weinberg kick), 4:59. Seminoles 21–0. Drive: 7 plays, 47 yards, 3:25.
- FSU – Gavin Sawchuk 1-yard run (Jake Weinberg kick), 1:45. Seminoles 28–0. Drive: 2 plays, 40 yards, 0:24.

Fourth quarter

- FSU – Randy Pittman Jr. 7-yard run (Jake Weinberg kick), 14:54. Seminoles 35–0. Drive: 4 plays, 20 yards, 1:05.
- FSU – Duce Robinson 11-yard pass from Tommy Castellanos (Jake Weinberg kick), 11:51. Seminoles 42–0. Drive: 4 plays, 78 yards, 1:44.
- WAKE – Micah Mays Jr. 6-yard pass from Deshawn Purdie (Connor Calvert kick), 6:49. Seminoles 42–7. Drive: 4 plays, 19 yards, 2:01.

Statistics	WAKE	FSU
First downs	19	18
Plays–yards	71–247	57–421
Rushes–yards	40–85	40–150
Passing yards	162	271
Passing: comp–att–int	18–31–1	12–17–0
Turnovers	2	1
Time of possession	34:24	25:36

Team	Category	Player	Statistics
Wake Forest	Passing	Robby Ashford	12/21, 93 yards, INT
Wake Forest	Rushing	Robby Ashford	12 carries, 59 yards
Wake Forest	Receiving	Micah Mays Jr.	5 receptions, 51 yards, TD
Florida State	Passing	Tommy Castellanos	12/16, 271 yards, TD
Florida State	Rushing	Samuel Singleton Jr.	14 carries, 91 yards, TD
Florida State	Receiving	Duce Robinson	5 receptions, 148 yards, TD

=== at Clemson (rivalry) ===
Florida State Seminoles (4–4) at Clemson Tigers (3–5) – Game summary

Quarter	1	2	3	4	Total
Seminoles	0	7	0	3	10
Tigers	8	10	3	3	24

at Memorial Stadium • Clemson, South Carolina

- Date: November 8
- Game time: 7:00 p.m.
- Game weather: Clear • Temperature: 64 °F (18 °C) • Wind: SW at 4 mph
- Game attendance: 81,500
- Referee: Adam Savoie
- TV announcers (ACCN): Wes Durham (play-by-play), Steve Addazio (analyst), and Dana Boyle (sideline reporter)
- Box score, Recap

Game information

First quarter

- (08:25) CLEM – Cade Klubnik 4-yard run, Clay Swinney run (Drive: 13 plays, 75 yards, 6:35; CLEM 8–0)

Second quarter

- (12:01) CLEM – Antonio Williams 4-yard pass from Cade Klubnik, Nolan Hauser kick (Drive: 2 plays, 39 yards, 0:41; CLEM 15–0)
- (02:31) CLEM – Nolan Hauser 40-yard field goal (Drive: 13 plays, 74 yards, 7:31; CLEM 18–0)
- (00:33) FSU – Lawayne McCoy 7-yard pass from Thomas Castellanos, Jake Weinberg kick (Drive: 10 plays, 75 yards, 1:58; CLEM 18–7)

Third quarter

- (06:01) CLEM – Nolan Hauser 23-yard field goal (Drive: 10 plays, 73 yards, 5:05; CLEM 21–7)

Fourth quarter

- (14:18) CLEM – Nolan Hauser 43-yard field goal (Drive: 9 plays, 28 yards, 4:56; CLEM 24–7)
- (07:37) FSU – Jake Weinberg 46-yard field goal (Drive: 13 plays, 47 yards, 6:41; CLEM 24–10)

Statistics	FSU	CLEM
First downs	19	16
Plays–yards	69–360	63–319
Rushes–yards	26–110	36–98
Passing yards	250	221
Passing: comp–att–int	23–43–1	20–27–0
Turnovers	1	0
Time of possession	25:38	34:22

Team	Category	Player	Statistics
Florida State	Passing	Tommy Castellanos	23/43, 250 yards, TD, INT
Florida State	Rushing	Tommy Castellanos	11 carries, 31 yards
Florida State	Receiving	Duce Robinson	9 receptions, 124 yards
Clemson	Passing	Cade Klubnik	20/27, 221 yards, TD
Clemson	Rushing	Adam Randall	15 carries, 48 yards
Clemson	Receiving	Antonio Williams	6 receptions, 62 yards, TD

=== vs Virginia Tech ===
Virginia Tech Hokies (3–6) at Florida State Seminoles (4–5) – Game summary

Quarter	1	2	3	4	Total
Hokies	0	7	0	7	14
Seminoles	0	10	14	10	34

at Doak Campbell Stadium • Tallahassee, Florida

- Date: November 15
- Game time: 7:30 p.m.
- Game weather: Clear • Temperature: 63 °F (17 °C) • Wind: S at 6 mph
- Game attendance: 64,937
- Referee: Nate Black
- TV announcers (ACCN): Chris Cotter (play-by-play), Max Browne (analyst), and Tori Petry (sideline reporter)
- Box score, Recap

Game information

First quarter

- No scoring plays

Second quarter

- FSU – Jake Weinberg 26-yard field goal, 10:56. Seminoles 3–0. Drive: 16 plays, 56 yards, 6:50.
- VT – Kyron Drones 4-yard run (John Love kick), 5:25. Hokies 7–3. Drive: 10 plays, 75 yards, 5:31.
- FSU – Duce Robinson 50-yard pass from Tommy Castellanos (Jake Weinberg kick), 3:11. Seminoles 10–7. Drive: 5 plays, 75 yards, 2:14.

Third quarter

- FSU – Tommy Castellanos 1-yard run (Jake Weinberg kick), 9:33. Seminoles 17–7. Drive: 13 plays, 63 yards, 5:20.
- FSU – Randy Pittman Jr. 1-yard run (Jake Weinberg kick), 0:54. Seminoles 24–7. Drive: 9 plays, 67 yards, 4:19.

Fourth quarter

- VT – Ayden Greene 8-yard pass from Kyron Drones (John Love kick), 11:20. Seminoles 24–14. Drive: 9 plays, 75 yards, 4:34.
- FSU – Tommy Castellanos 15-yard run (Jake Weinberg kick), 7:31. Seminoles 31–14. Drive: 7 plays, 61 yards, 3:41.
- FSU – Jake Weinberg 34-yard field goal, 4:12. Seminoles 34–14. Drive: 5 plays, 17 yards, 2:18.

Statistics	VT	FSU
First downs	20	27
Plays–yards	59–363	71–431
Rushes–yards	41–238	46–237
Passing yards	125	194
Passing: comp–att–int	10–18–1	13–25–0
Turnovers	2	0
Time of possession	27:25	32:35

Team	Category	Player	Statistics
Virginia Tech	Passing	Kyron Drones	10/18, 125 yards, TD, INT
Virginia Tech	Rushing	Marcellous Hawkins	12 carries, 101 yards
Virginia Tech	Receiving	Ayden Greene	2 receptions, 39 yards, TD
Florida State	Passing	Tommy Castellanos	12/24, 189 yards, TD
Florida State	Rushing	Ousmane Kromah	11 carries, 59 yards
Florida State	Receiving	Duce Robinson	6 receptions, 134 yards, TD

=== at NC State ===
Florida State Seminoles (5–5) at NC State Wolfpack (5–5) – Game summary

Quarter	1	2	3	4	Total
Seminoles	0	3	0	8	11
Wolfpack	7	0	7	7	21

at Carter–Finley Stadium • Raleigh, North Carolina

- Date: November 21
- Game time: 8:00 p.m.
- Game weather: Mist • Temperature: 61 °F (16 °C) • Wind: SSW at 4 mph (6.4 km/h)
- Game attendance: 56,919
- Referee: Riley Johnson
- TV announcers (ESPN): Anish Shroff (play-by-play), Andre Ware (analyst), and Paul Carcaterra (sideline reporter)
- Box score, Recap

Game information

First quarter

- (2:56) NCSU – Terrell Anderson 23-yard pass from CJ Bailey, Kanoah Vinesett kick (Drive: 9 plays, 73 yards, 5:05; NC State 7–0)

Second quarter

- (14:06) FSU – Jake Weinberg 46-yard field goal (Drive: 10 plays, 52 yards, 3:44; NC State 7–3)

Third quarter

- (4:17) NCSU – Will Wilson 1-yard run, Kanoah Vinesett kick (Drive: 15 plays, 79 yards, 8:59; NC State 14–3)

Fourth quarter

- (8:17) FSU – Duce Robinson 9-yard pass from Tommy Castellanos, Jayvan Boggs pass (Drive: 10 plays, 86 yards, 4:42; NC State 14–11)
- (1:47) NCSU – Justin Joly 12-yard pass from CJ Bailey, Kanoah Vinesett kick (Drive: 4 plays, 17 yards, 0:34; NC State 21–11)

Statistics	FSU	NCSU
First downs	21	20
Plays–yards	66–383	68–286
Rushes–yards	34–180	42–134
Passing yards	203	152
Passing: comp–att–int	16–32–2	18–26–0
Turnovers	4	0
Time of possession	27:03	32:57

Team	Category	Player	Statistics
Florida State	Passing	Tommy Castellanos	16/32, 203 yards, TD, 2 INT
Florida State	Rushing	Tommy Castellanos	11 carries, 76 yards
Florida State	Receiving	Duce Robinson	4 receptions, 74 yards, TD
NC State	Passing	CJ Bailey	18/25, 152 yards, 2 TD
NC State	Rushing	Hollywood Smothers	21 carries, 84 yards
NC State	Receiving	Justin Joly	5 receptions, 66 yards, TD

=== at Florida (rivalry, Florida Cup) ===
Florida State Seminoles (5–6) at Florida Gators (3–8) – Game summary

Quarter	1	2	3	4	Total
Seminoles	0	14	0	7	21
Gators	10	7	14	9	40

at Ben Hill Griffin Stadium • Gainesville, Florida

- Date: November 29
- Game time: 4:30 p.m.
- Game weather: Cloudy • Temperature: 68 °F (20 °C) • Wind: NE at 6 mph (9.7 km/h)
- Game attendance: 90,007
- Referee: Adam Savoie
- TV announcers (ESPN2): Jay Alter (play-by-play), Rocky Boiman (analyst) and Marilyn Payne (sideline reporter)
- Box score, Recap

Game information

First quarter

- (9:25) FLA – Trey Smack 23-yard field goal (Drive: 8 plays, 50 yards, 3:38; Florida 3–0)
- (2:49) FLA – J. Michael Sturdivant 5-yard pass from DJ Lagway, Trey Smack kick (Drive: 11 plays, 76 yards, 4:35; Florida 10–0)

Second quarter

- (13:39) FSU – Micahi Danzy 13-yard pass from Tommy Castellanos, Jake Weinberg kick (Drive: 9 plays, 75 yards, 4:10; Florida 10–7)
- (5:38) FLA – Tony Livingston 9-yard pass from DJ Lagway, Trey Smack kick (Drive: 13 plays, 75 yards, 8:01; Florida 17–7)
- (1:11) FSU – Tommy Castellanos 4-yard run, Jake Weinberg kick (Drive: 4 plays, 21 yards, 1:11; Florida 17–14)

Third quarter

- (9:47) FLA – Hayden Hansen 3-yard pass from DJ Lagway, Trey Smack kick (Drive: 3 plays, 40 yards, 1:12; Florida 24–14)
- (2:55) FLA – Jadan Baugh 22-yard run, Trey Smack kick (Drive: 8 plays, 58 yards, 5:33; Florida 31–14)

Fourth quarter

- (7:38) FLA – Trey Smack 54-yard field goal (Drive: 9 plays, 41 yards, 6:34; Florida 34–14)
- (3:07) FSU – Lawayne McCoy 17-yard pass from Tommy Castellanos, Jake Weinberg kick (Drive: 11 plays, 83 yards, 4:26; Florida 34–21)
- (0:56) FLA – Jadan Baugh 12-yard run (Drive: 8 plays, 46 yards, 2:10; Florida 40–21)

Statistics	FSU	FLA
First downs	23	26
Plays–yards	65–407	69–440
Rushes–yards	37–167	45–272
Passing yards	240	168
Passing: comp–att–int	17–28–1	15–24–1
Turnovers	2	1
Time of possession	34:42	25:18

Team	Category	Player	Statistics
Florida State	Passing	Tommy Castellanos	17/28, 240 yards, 2 TD, INT
Florida State	Rushing	Tommy Castellanos	19 carries, 77 yards, TD
Florida State	Receiving	Lawayne McCoy	6 receptions, 110 yards, TD
Florida	Passing	DJ Lagway	15/24, 168 yards, 3 TD, INT
Florida	Rushing	Jadan Baugh	38 carries, 266 yards, 2 TD
Florida	Receiving	J. Michael Sturdivant	3 receptions, 58 yards, TD

== Awards and honors ==
Player	Award/Honor
Darrell Jackson Jr.	Preseason All-ACC; Bednarik Award watchlist All-ACC Honorable Mention
Tommy Castellanos	Maxwell National Player of the Week; Davey O'Brien National Quarterback of the Week; Maxwell Award watchlist Johnny Unitas Golden Arm Award watchlist
Richie Leonard, IV	Wuerffel Trophy watchlist All-ACC Honorable Mention
Mason Arnold	Mannelly Award watchlist
Gavin Sawchuk	Doak Walker Award watchlist
Luke Petitbon	Outland National Player of the Week; ACC Offensive Lineman of the Week; Rimington Trophy watchlist First Team All-ACC
Randy Pittman Jr.	Mackey Award watchlist All-ACC Honorable Mention
Landen Thomas	Mackey Award watchlist
Jaylin Lucas	Comeback Player of the Year Award watchlist
Ousmane Kromah	Shaun Alexander Freshman of the Year watchlist
Micahi Danzy	ACC Rookie of the Week
Duce Robinson	ACC Receiver of the Week; Biletnikoff Award semifinalist First Team All-ACC
Earl Little Jr.	Third Team All-ACC
Mandrell Desir	All-ACC Honorable Mention; True Freshman All-American
Jerry Wilson	All-ACC Honorable Mention
Mike Norvell	Paul "Bear" Bryant National Coach of the Week; Dodd National Coach of the Week

== Personnel ==
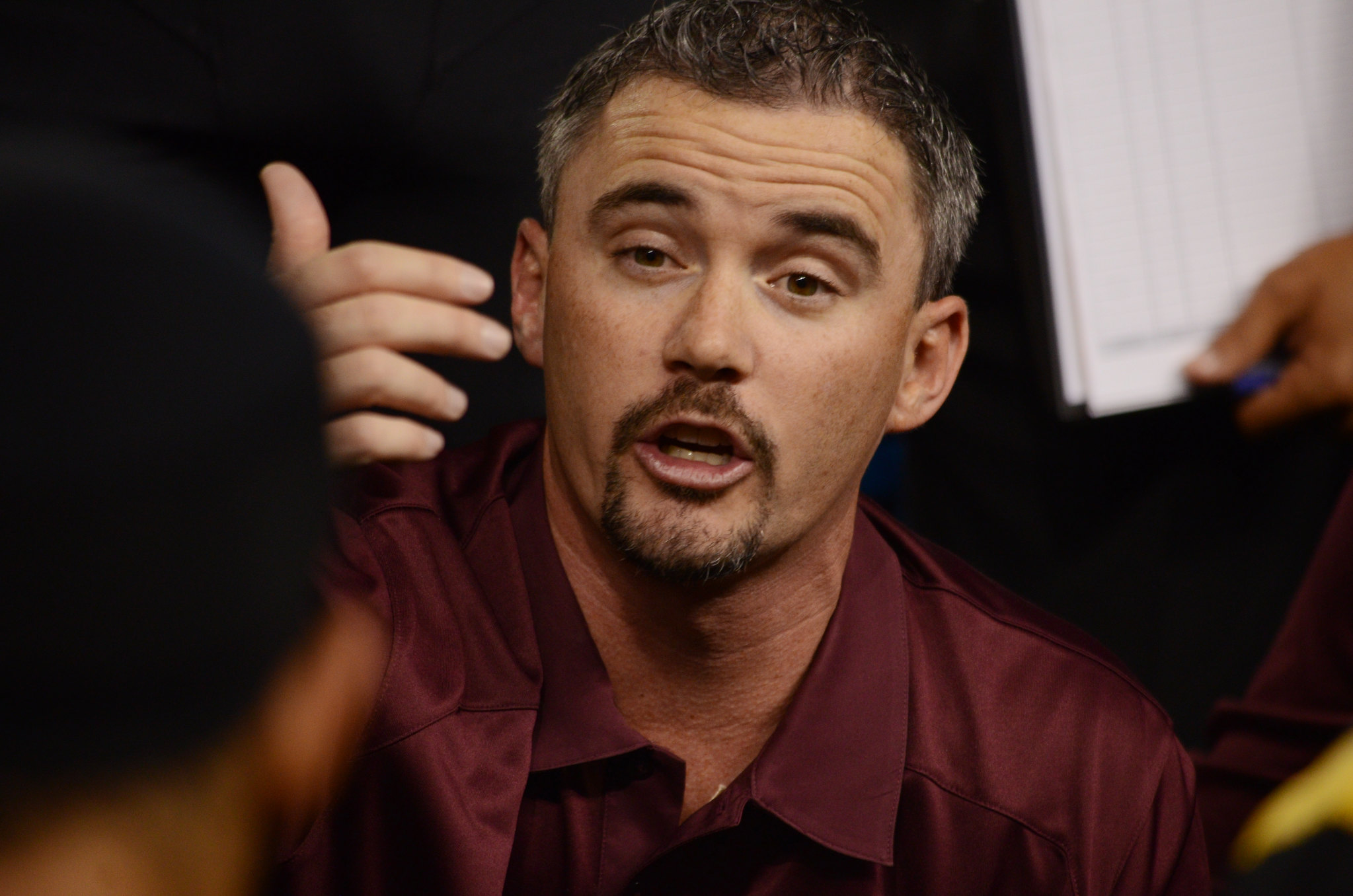
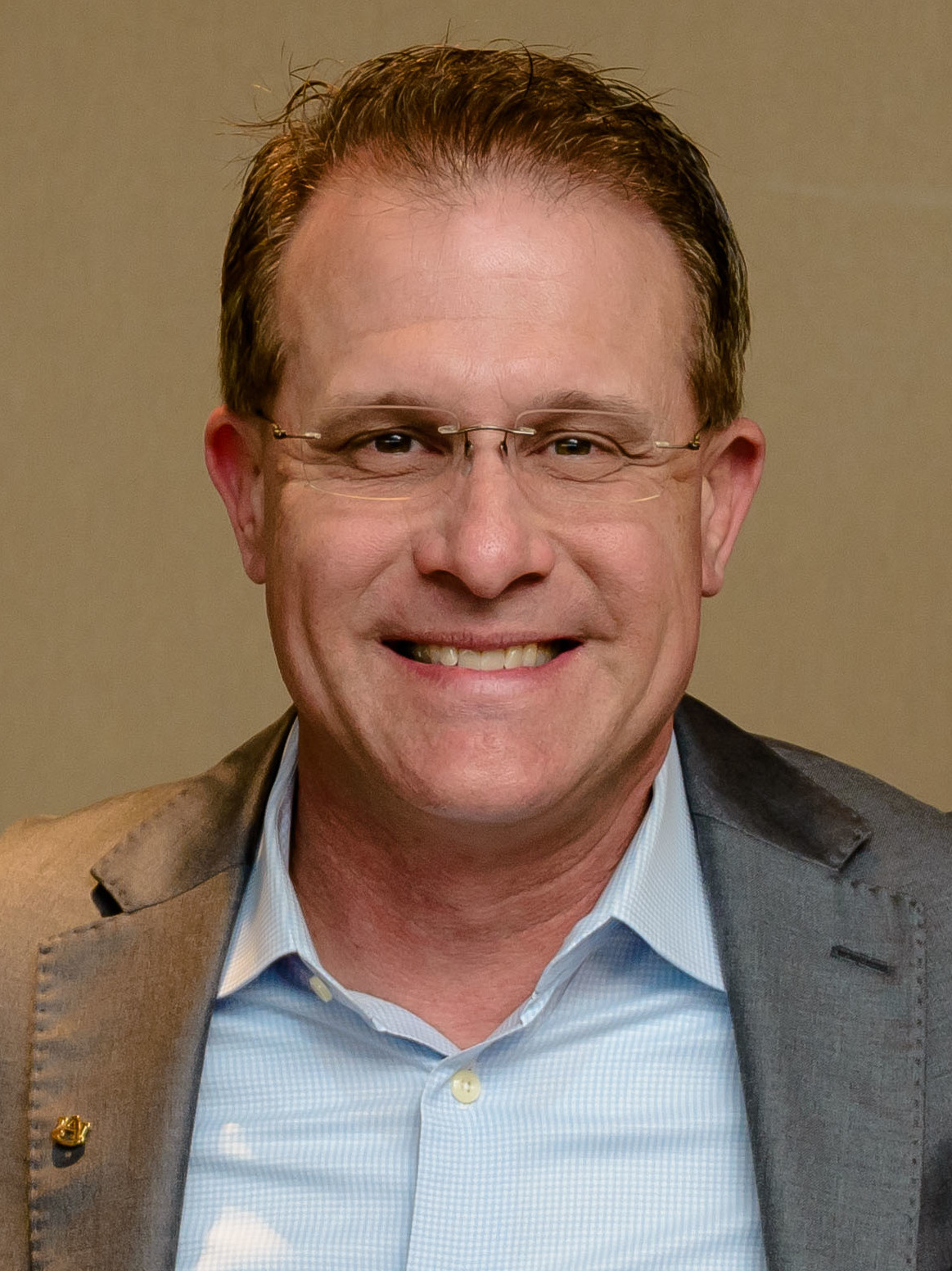
Mike Norvell is in his sixth year as head coach of the Seminoles; Gus Malzahn is in his first year as offensive coordinator at Florida State.

=== Roster ===
2025 Florida State Seminoles football team roster
Players
Coaches
Offense

Pos.	#	Name	Class
WR	0	Duce Robinson	Jr
QB	1	Tommy Castellanos	Sr
RB	3	Kam Davis	So
WR	4	Squirrel White	Sr
RB	5	Roydell Williams	Sr
WR	6	Gavin Blackwell	Sr
WR	7	Lawayne McCoy	So
QB	9	Kevin Sperry	Fr
QB	11	Brock Glenn	So
QB	12	Michael Grant	So
RB	12	Jaylin Lucas	Jr
TE	13	Randy Pittman Jr.	Jr
QB	14	Jaylen King	Jr
WR	15	Jayvan Boggs	Fr
QB	16	Gavin Markey	Fr
TE	18	Landen Thomas	So
WR	19	Micahi Danzy	Fr
RB	21	Zay Parks	Fr
TE	23	Chase Loftin	Fr
RB	26	Caziah Holmes	Sr
RB	27	Gavin Sawchuk	Jr
RB	28	Samuel Singleton Jr.	So
RB	30	Jeremiah Johnson	Fr
RB	32	Ousmane Kromah	Fr
TE, DL	40	Amaree Williams	So
TE	45	Luke Douglas	Fr
OL	51	Luke Petitbon	Sr
OL	52	Chavez Thompson	Fr
OL	54	Chastan Brown	Fr
OL	55	Gunnar Hansen	Sr
OL	56	Tye Hylton	Fr
OL	57	Micah Pettus	Sr
OL	63	Mario Nash Jr.	Fr
OL	64	Jacob Rizy	Sr
OL	65	Andre' Otto	So
OL	67	Richie Leonard IV	Sr
OL	70	Manasse Itete	Fr
OL	71	Ja'Elyne Matthews	Fr
OL	72	Josh Raymond	Fr
OL	74	Jonathan Daniels	Fr
OL	75	Sean Poret	Fr
OL	76	Adrian Medley	Sr
OL	78	Jayden Todd	Fr
OL	79	Lucas Simmons	So
WR	81	Elijah Moore	Fr
WR	82	Teriq Mallory	Fr
WR	83	Tae'Shaun Gelsey	Fr
WR	85	Willy Suarez	Fr
TE	87	Markeston Douglas	Sr
WR	88	Camdon Frier	Fr
TE	89	Greyson Labiad	Jr

Defense

Pos.	#	Name	Class
DB	0	Earl Little Jr.	Jr
DB	1	Shyheim Brown	Sr
DB	3	Edwin Joseph	So
DB	4	Charles Lester III	Fr
DL	5	Daniel Lyons	Jr
DL	6	Darrell Jackson Jr.	Sr
LB	7	Stefon Thompson	Sr
DL	8	Deante McCray	Jr
LB	9	Omar Graham Jr.	Jr
DL	10	James Williams	Jr
DB	11	Ja'Bril Rawls	So
DL	13	Deamontae Diggs	Sr
DB	14	Cai Bates	Fr
DB	15	Shamar Arnoux	Fr
DB	16	Quindarrius Jones	Jr
DB	18	Jamari Howard	Fr
DB	19	Jeremiah Wilson	Sr
LB	20	Blake Nichelson	Jr
DB	21	Max Redmon	Fr
DB	22	Zae Thomas	Fr
DB	24	K.J. Kirkland	So
DB	26	Ricky Knight III	Fr
DB	27	Ashlynd Barker	Jr
LB	28	Justin Cryer	Jr
LB	29	Caleb LaVallee	So
DB	30	Jarvis Boatwright	Fr
LB	31	Elijah Herring	Sr
DB	33	Antonio Cromartie Jr.	Fr
LB	35	Ethan Pritchard	Fr
LB	36	Jayden Parrish	Fr
DB	37	Christian White	Jr
LB	41	AJ Cottrill	Jr
LB	43	Gav Holman	Fr
DL	44	Jaden Jones	Sr
DB	47	Donny Hiebert	Jr
LB	53	Brandon Torres	So
DL	55	Kevin Wynn	Fr
DL	56	KJ Sampson	So
DL	90	Darryll Desir	Fr
DL	91	Tyeland Coleman	Jr
DL	93	Mandrell Desir	Fr
DL	94	L A Jessie Harrold	Fr
DL	96	Tylon Lee	Fr
DL	97	Jayson Jenkins	Jr
DL	98	Grant Fielder	So
DL	99	Jamorie Flagg	Fr

Special teams

Pos.	#	Name	Class
K	22	Jake Weinberg	Fr
LS	32	Mason Arnold	Sr
P	38	Ethan Post	Fr
PK	42	Brunno Reus	Fr
P	43	Mac Chiumento	Jr
LS	53	Alex Nocco	Fr
LS	60	Peyton Naylor	So

Head coach

- Mike Norvell

Coordinators/assistant coaches

- Gus Malzahn – Offensive coordinator
- Tony White – Defensive coordinator
- John Papuchis – Special teams coordinator/linebackers
- Chris Thomsen – Deputy head coach/tight ends
- Tim Harris Jr. – Pass game coordinator/wide receivers
- Evan Cooper – Safeties
- Herb Hand – Offensive line
- David Johnson – Running backs/recruiting coordinator
- Terrance Knighton – Defensive line
- Patrick Surtain – Defensive backs
- Tony Tokarz – Quarterbacks
- Odell Haggins – Associate head coach
- Ernie Sims – Assistant linebackers
- Austin Tucker – Assistant wide receivers
- Cooper Williams – Assistant offensive line
- Zach Arnett - Analyst

Legend

- (C) Team captain
- (S) Suspended
- (I) Ineligible
- Injured
- Redshirt

Roster

== Players drafted into the NFL ==
Round	Pick	Player	Position	NFL Club
4	103	Darrell Jackson Jr.	DL	New York Jets
