= 2025 Kent State Golden Flashes football team =

American college football season

2025 Kent State Golden Flashes football
- Conference: Mid-American Conference
- Record: 5–7 (4–4 MAC)
- Head coach: Mark Carney (1st season; interim first 8 games, official remainder of season)
- Offensive coordinator: Clay Patterson (2nd season)
- Offensive scheme: Spread
- Defensive coordinator: Cherokee Valeria (1st season)
- Base defense: Multiple 3–4
- Home stadium: Dix Stadium

2025 Mid-American Conference football standings
	Conf.			Overall
Team	W		L	W		L
Western Michigan y$	7	–	1	10	–	4
Miami (OH) y	6	–	2	7	–	7
Ohio	6	–	2	9	–	4
Toledo	6	–	2	8	–	5
Central Michigan	5	–	3	7	–	6
Akron*	4	–	4	5	–	7
Buffalo	4	–	4	5	–	7
Kent State	4	–	4	5	–	7
Eastern Michigan	3	–	5	4	–	8
Ball State	3	–	5	4	–	8
Bowling Green	2	–	6	4	–	8
Northern Illinois	2	–	6	3	–	9
UMass	0	–	8	0	–	12
Championship: Western Michigan 23, Miami (OH) 13
$ – Conference champion; y – Championship game participant; * Ineligible for postseason play due to low APR score

The 2025 Kent State Golden Flashes football team represented Kent State University in the Mid-American Conference during the 2025 NCAA Division I FBS football season. The Golden Flashes were led by head coach Mark Carney. The Golden Flashes played home games at Dix Stadium, located in Kent, Ohio. Carney, who was the team's offensive coordinator, was appointed interim head coach after Kenni Burns, who had led the team in 2023 and 2024, was fired in April 2025. Carney was named the 24th head coach of Kent State football on October 30, 2025.

== Schedule ==
Date	Time	Opponent	Site	TV	Result	Attendance
August 30	12:00 p.m.	Merrimack (FCS)*	Dix Stadium; Kent, OH	ESPN+	W 21–17	8,647
September 6	12:00 p.m.	at No. 24 Texas Tech*	Jones AT&T Stadium; Lubbock, TX	TNT/TruTV	L 14–62	60,229
September 13	12:00 p.m.	Buffalo	Dix Stadium; Kent, OH	CBSSN	L 28–31	11,833
September 20	3:30 p.m.	at No. 7 Florida State*	Doak Campbell Stadium; Tallahassee, FL	ACCN	L 10–66	67,277
October 4	4:00 p.m.	at No. 5 Oklahoma*	Gaylord Family Oklahoma Memorial Stadium; Norman, OK	SECN	L 0–44	83,016
October 11	2:30 p.m.	UMass^{†}	Dix Stadium; Kent, OH	ESPN+	W 42–6	11,523
October 18	2:00 p.m.	at Toledo	Glass Bowl; Toledo, OH	ESPN+	L 10–45	18,417
October 25	12:00 p.m.	Bowling Green	Dix Stadium; Kent, OH (Anniversary Award)	ESPN+	W 24–21	9,260
November 5	7:00 p.m.	at Ball State	Scheumann Stadium; Muncie, IN	ESPNU	L 13–17	5,225
November 11	7:30 p.m.	at Akron	InfoCision Stadium–Summa Field; Akron, OH (Wagon Wheel)	ESPNU	W 42–35 ^{OT}	8,501
November 19	7:00 p.m.	Central Michigan	Dix Stadium; Kent, OH	ESPNU	L 16–28	8,112
November 28	12:00 p.m.	at Northern Illinois	Huskie Stadium; DeKalb, IL	CBSSN	W 35–31	3,090
*Non-conference game; ^{†}Homecoming; Rankings from AP Poll and CFP Rankings released prior to game; All times are in Eastern time

== Preseason ==
The MAC Football Kickoff was held on Thursday, July 24, 2025 at the Ford Field in Detroit, Michigan from 9:00 am EDT to 1:30 pm EDT.

=== Preseason MAC poll ===
On July 24, Kent State was picked to finished last out of the conference's 13 teams in the MAC's preseason coaches poll.

== Game summaries ==
=== Merrimack (FCS) ===
Merrimack Warriors (FCS) (0–0) at Kent State Golden Flashes (0–0) – Game summary

Quarter	1	2	3	4	Total
Warriors (FCS)	0	3	3	11	17
Golden Flashes	0	7	7	7	21

at Dix Stadium • Kent, Ohio

- Date: August 30
- Game time: 12:00 PM EDT
- Game weather: Cloudy • Temperature: 64 °F (18 °C) • Wind: NE at 8 miles per hour (13 km/h)
- Game attendance: 8,647
- Referee: Chris La Mange
- TV announcers (ESPN+): Anthony Lima (play-by-play) and Je'Rod Cherry (analyst)

Game information

First quarter

- No scoring plays.

Second quarter

- (3:24) KENT – Cade Wolford 30-yard pass from C. J. Montes, Will Hryszko kick (Drive: 6 plays, 76 yards, 2:46; KENT 7-0)
- (0:01) MRMK – Carlton Thai 26-yard field goal (Drive: 8 Plays, 80 yards, 0:56; KENT 7-3)

Third quarter

- (9:56) KENT – Cade Wolford 79-yard pass from Dru DeShields, Will Hryszko kick (Drive: 2 plays, 80 yards, 0:45; KENT 14-3)
- (2:26) MRMK – Carlton Thai 37-yard field goal (Drive: 14 plays, 55 yards, 7:30; KENT 14-6)

Fourth quarter

- (8:38) MRMK – Seth Sweitzer 36-yard pass from Ayden Pereira, Cade Callahan Pass (Drive: 4 plays, 75 yards, 2:06; Tied 14-14)
- (5:40) MRMK – Carlton Thai 45-yard field goal (Drive: 4 plays, 6 yards, 2:06; MRMK 17-14)
- (5:28) KENT – Da'Realyst Clark 100-yard kickoff return, Will Hryszko kick (0:12; KENT 21-17)

Statistics	MRMK	KENT
First downs	17	15
Plays–yards	66–340	56–305
Rushes–yards	35–164	37–96
Passing yards	176	209
Passing: Comp–Att–Int	15-31–0	12-19–0
Turnovers	0	1
Time of possession	31:31	28:29

Team	Category	Player	Statistics
Merrimack	Passing	Ayden Pereira	15/31, 176 yards, TD
Merrimack	Rushing	Ayden Pereira	19 carries, 103 yards
Merrimack	Receiving	Seth Sweitzer	3 receptions, 59 yards, TD
Kent State	Passing	Dru DeShields	6/10, 118 yards, TD
Kent State	Rushing	Gavin Garcia	15 carries, 49 yards
Kent State	Receiving	Cade Wolford	2 receptions, 109 yards, 2 TD

=== at No. 24 Texas Tech ===
Kent State Golden Flashes (1–0) at No. 24 Texas Tech Red Raiders (1–0) – Game summary

Quarter	1	2	3	4	Total
Golden Flashes	0	0	0	14	14
No. 24 Red Raiders	21	27	7	7	62

at Jones AT&T Stadium • Lubbock, Texas

- Date: September 6
- Game time: 11:00 AM CDT
- Game weather: Cloudy • Temperature: 58 °F (14 °C)
- Game attendance: 60,229
- Referee: Tim Rich
- TV announcers (TNT): J.B. Long (play-by-play), Mike Golic Jr. (analyst), and Allie LaForce (sideline reporter)

Game information

First Quarter

- TTU – Reggie Virgil 35-yard pass from Behren Morton (Stone Harrington kick), 11:53. Red Raiders 7–0. Drive: 8 plays, 78 yards, 3:07.
- TTU – Cameron Dickey 2-yard run (Upton Bellenfant kick), 9:57. Red Raiders 14–0. Drive: 3 plays, 12 yards, 1:00.
- TTU – Coy Eakin 42-yard pass from Behren Morton (Stone Harrington kick), 6:31. Red Raiders 21–0. Drive: 4 plays, 76 yards, 0:58.

Second Quarter

- TTU – Upton Bellenfant 23-yard field goal, 14:19. Red Raiders 24–0. Drive: 8 plays, 32 yards, 1:42.
- TTU – Cameron Dickey 1-yard run (Stone Harrington kick), 10:24. Red Raiders 31–0. Drive: 7 plays, 46 yards, 2:51.
- TTU – Skyler Gill-Howard 55-yard interception return (Upton Bellenfant kick), 8:35. Red Raiders 38–0.
- TTU – Stone Harrington 47-yard field goal, 1:48. Red Raiders 41–0. Drive: 9 plays, 16 yards, 3:10.
- TTU – Reggie Virgil 3-yard pass from Behren Morton (Upton Bellenfant kick), 0:12. Red Raiders 48–0. Drive: 4 plays, 60 yards, 0:31.

Third Quarter

- TTU – Bryson Jones 38-yard pass from Will Hammond (Stone Harrington kick), 5:06. Red Raiders 55–0. Drive: 4 plays, 57 yards, 1:16.

Fourth Quarter

- KENT – Dru DeShields 10-yard run (Will Hryszko kick), 12:11. Red Raiders 55–7. Drive: 7 plays, 83 yards, 3:43.
- KENT – Cade Wolford 16-yard pass from Dru DeShields (Will Hryszko kick), 10:20. Red Raiders 55–14. Drive: 3 plays, 31 yards, 1:27.
- TTU – Will Hammond 13-yard run (Upton Bellenfant kick), 6:49. Red Raiders 62–14. Drive: 8 plays, 75 yards, 3:31.

Statistics	KENT	TTU
First downs	10	27
Plays–yards	59–228	80–601
Rushes–yards	34–63	42–230
Passing yards	165	371
Passing: comp–att–int	11–25–1	27–38–0
Turnovers	2	1
Time of possession	29:57	30:03

Team	Category	Player	Statistics
Kent State	Passing	Dru DeShields	7/15, 116 yards, TD
Kent State	Rushing	Gavin Garcia	12 carries, 25 yards
Kent State	Receiving	Ardell Banks	2 receptions, 49 yards
Texas Tech	Passing	Behren Morton	18/26, 258 yards, 3 TD
Texas Tech	Rushing	Adam Hill	16 carries, 127 yards
Texas Tech	Receiving	Coy Eakin	3 receptions, 59 yards, TD

=== Buffalo ===
Buffalo Bulls (1–1) at Kent State Golden Flashes (1–1) – Game summary

Quarter	1	2	3	4	Total
Bulls	0	10	14	7	31
Golden Flashes	7	7	7	7	28

at Dix Stadium • Kent, Ohio

- Date: September 13
- Game time: 12:00 PM EDT
- Game weather: Sunny • Temperature: 76 °F (24 °C) • Wind: N at 1 mile per hour (1.6 km/h)
- Game attendance: 11,833
- Referee: Chris LaMange
- TV announcers (CBSSN): Jordan Kent (play-by-play) and Randy Cross (analyst)

Game information

First quarter

- (8:54) KENT – Maurice Stephens 31-yard run, Will Hryszko kick (Drive: 3 plays, 61 yards, 1:29; KENT 7-0)

Second quarter

- (2:33) KENT – Cade Wolford 41-yard pass from Dru DeShields, Will Hryszko kick (Drive: 4 Plays, 71 yards, 1:49; KENT 14-0)
- (1:12) BUFF – Nik McMillan 38-yard pass from Ta'Quan Roberson, Jack Howes kick (Drive: 7 plays, 92 yards, 1:18; KENT 14-7)
- (0:00) BUFF – Jack Howes 28-yard field goal (Drive: 8 plays, 50 yards, 0:49; KENT 14-10)

Third quarter

- (9:28) BUFF – Chance Morrow 21-yard pass from Ta'Quan Roberson, Jack Howes kick (Drive: 4 plays, 51 yards, 1:01; BUFF 17-14)
- (5:18) BUFF – Al-Jay Henderson 38-yard run, Jack Howes kick (Drive: 6 plays, 85 yards, 2:16; BUFF 24-14)
- (2:58) KENT – Terik Mulder 50-yard pass from Dru DeShields, Will Hryszko kick (Drive: 4 plays, 75 yards, 2:17; BUFF 24-21)

Fourth quarter

- (2:38) KENT – Dru DeShields 3-yard run, Will Hryszko kick (Drive: 21 plays, 93 yards, 12:15; KENT 28-24)
- (1:03) BUFF – Victor Snow 22-yard pass from Ta'Quan Roberson, Jack Howes kick (Drive: 8 plays, 76 yards, 1:29; BUFF 31-28)

Statistics	BUFF	KENT
First downs	23	20
Plays–yards	69–457	77–423
Rushes–yards	29–139	44–144
Passing yards	318	279
Passing: Comp–Att–Int	28–40–1	22-33–0
Turnovers	2	1
Time of possession	22:38	37:22

Team	Category	Player	Statistics
Buffalo	Passing	Ta'Quan Roberson	28/40, 318 yards, 3 TD, INT
Buffalo	Rushing	Al-Jay Henderson	15 carries, 75 yards, TD
Buffalo	Receiving	Nik McMillan	7 receptions, 117 yards, TD
Kent State	Passing	Dru DeShields	22/33, 279 yards, 2 TD
Kent State	Rushing	Gavin Garcia	18 carries, 61 yards
Kent State	Receiving	Cade Wolford	3 receptions, 95 yards, TD

=== at No. 7 Florida State ===
Kent State Golden Flashes (1–2) at No. 7 Florida State Seminoles (2–0) – Game summary

Quarter	1	2	3	4	Total
Golden Flashes	7	0	0	3	10
No. 7 Seminoles	35	10	14	7	66

at Doak Campbell Stadium • Tallahassee, Florida

- Date: September 20
- Game time: 3:30 PM EDT
- Game weather: Cloudy • Temperature: 94 °F (34 °C) • Wind: SE at 6 miles per hour (9.7 km/h)
- Game attendance: 67,277
- Referee: Jon Noli
- TV announcers (ACCN): Jorge Sedano (play-by-play), Rodney McLeod (analyst), and Victoria Arlen (sideline reporter)

Game information

First quarter

- (13:39) FSU – Gavin Sawchuk 4-yard run, Jake Weinberg kick (Drive: 4 plays, 65 yards, 1:21; Florida State 7–0)
- (8:19) FSU – Tommy Castellanos 12-yard run, Jake Weinberg kick (Drive: 8 plays, 95 yards, 3:23; Florida State 14–0)
- (8:08) KSU - DaShawn Martin 75-yard pass from Dru DeShields, Will Hryszko kick (Drive: 1 play, 75 yards, 0:11; Florida State 14–7)
- (7:33) FSU - Tommy Castellanos 10-yard run, Jake Weinberg kick (Drive: 2 plays, 75 yards, 0:35; Florida State 21–7)
- (3:18) FSU - Micahi Danzy 64-yard run, Jake Weinberg kick (Drive: 7 plays, 84 yards, 2:47; Florida State 28–7)
- (0:00) FSU - Gavin Sawchuk 2-yard run, Jake Weinberg kick (Drive: 4 plays, 47 yards, 1:14; Florida State 35–7)

Second quarter

- (2:16) FSU - Samuel Singleton Jr. 15-yard run, Jake Weinberg kick (Drive: 9 plays, 73 yards, 4:11; Florida State 42–7)
- (0:00) FSU - Jake Weinberg 25-yard field goal (Drive: 6 plays, 47 yards, 0:35; Florida State 45–7)

Third quarter

- (10:04) FSU - Kam Davis 1-yard run, Jake Weinberg kick (Drive: 7 plays, 75 yards, 3:33; Florida State 52–7)
- (5:02) FSU - Landen Thomas 2-yard pass from Brock Glenn, Jake Weinberg kick (Drive: 10 plays, 58 yards, 4:02; Florida State 59–7)

Fourth quarter

- (12:41) KSU - Will Hryszko 38-yard field goal (Drive: 14 plays, 54 yards, 7:21; Florida State 59–10)
- (8:20) FSU - Samuel Singleton Jr. 37-yard run, Brunno Reus kick (Drive: 7 plays, 65 yards, 4:21; Florida State 66–10)

Statistics	KENT	FSU
First downs	12	37
Plays–yards	55–206	78–775
Rushes–yards	28–43	54–498
Passing yards	163	277
Passing: Comp–Att–Int	13–27–1	16–24–1
Turnovers	1	1
Time of possession	25:29	34:31

Team	Category	Player	Statistics
Kent State	Passing	Dru DeShields	9/18, 129 yards, TD, INT
Kent State	Rushing	Gavin Garcia	14 carries, 40 yards
Kent State	Receiving	DaShawn Martin	3 receptions, 94 yards, TD
Florida State	Passing	Tommy Castellanos	10/13, 205 yards, INT
Florida State	Rushing	Gavin Sawchuk	11 carries, 97 yards, 2 TD
Florida State	Receiving	Micahi Danzy	2 receptions, 112 yards

=== at No. 5 Oklahoma ===
Kent State Golden Flashes (1–3) at No. 5 Oklahoma Sooners (4–0) – Game summary

Quarter	1	2	3	4	Total
Golden Flashes	0	0	0	0	0
No. 5 Sooners	10	13	21	0	44

at Gaylord Family Oklahoma Memorial Stadium • Norman, Oklahoma

- Date: October 4
- Game time: 3:00 PM CDT
- Game weather: Sunny • Temperature: 86 °F (30 °C)
- Game attendance: 83,016
- Referee: Matt Loeffler
- TV announcers (SECN): Dave Neal (play-by-play), Fozzy Whittaker (analyst), and Morgan Uber (sideline reporter)

Game information

First quarter

- (9:55) OU – Isaiah Sategna III 30-yard pass from Michael Hawkins Jr., Tate Sandell kick (Drive: 4 plays, 42 yards, 1:29; OKLA 7–0)
- (5:41) OU – Tate Sandell 49-yard field goal (Drive: 6 plays, 24 yards, 2:38; OKLA 10–0)

Second quarter

- (14:28) OU – Kaden Helms 3-yard pass from Michael Hawkins Jr., Tate Sandell kick (Drive: 9 plays, 74 yards, 4:11; OKLA 17–0)
- (9:09) OU – Tate Sandell 39-yard field goal (Drive: 7 plays, 32 yards, 3:40; OKLA 20–0)
- (0:56) OU – Tate Sandell 55-yard field goal (Drive: 10 plays, 42 yards, 3:59; OKLA 23–0)

Third quarter

- (10:17) OU – Gracen Halton 4-yard fumble return, Tate Sandell kick (Drive: 3 plays, -6 yards, 1:08; OKLA 30–0)
- (6:35) OU – Michael Hawkins Jr. 7-yard run, Tate Sandell kick (Drive: 3 plays, 18 yards, 1:02; OKLA 37–0)
- (3:55) OU – Isaiah Sategna III 9-yard pass from Michael Hawkins Jr., Tate Sandell kick (Drive: 6 plays, 30 yards, 2:28; OKLA 44–0)

Fourth quarter

- No scoring plays

Statistics	KENT	OU
First downs	7	23
Plays–yards	52–135	68–355
Rushes–yards	33–17	41–185
Passing yards	118	170
Passing: Comp–Att–Int	10–19–1	15–27–0
Turnovers	2	0
Time of possession	28:58	31:02

Team	Category	Player	Statistics
Kent State	Passing	Devin Kargman	8/16, 74 yards, INT
Kent State	Rushing	Jordan Nubin	7 carries, 18 yards
Kent State	Receiving	Wayne Harris	3 receptions, 18 yards
Oklahoma	Passing	Michael Hawkins Jr.	14/24, 162 yards, 3 TD
Oklahoma	Rushing	Tory Blaylock	15 carries, 78 yards
Oklahoma	Receiving	Isaiah Sategna III	4 receptions, 75 yards, 2 TD

=== UMass ===
UMass Minutemen (0–5) at Kent State Golden Flashes (1–4) – Game summary

Quarter	1	2	3	4	Total
Minutemen	0	6	0	0	6
Golden Flashes	14	7	21	0	42

at Dix Stadium • Kent, Ohio

- Date: October 11
- Game time: 2:30 p.m. EDT
- Game weather: Sunny • Temperature: 64 °F (18 °C) • Wind: NE at 5 miles per hour (8.0 km/h)
- Game attendance: 11,523
- Referee: Rick Warne
- TV announcers (ESPN+): Anthony Lima (play-by-play) and Doc Holliday (analyst)

Game information

First quarter

- KENT – Da'Realyst Clark 91-yard kickoff return (Will Hryszko kick), 14:49. Golden Flashes 7–0.
- KENT – Sebastian Brown 36-yard pass from Dru DeShields (Will Hryszko kick), 5:47. Golden Flashes 14–0. Drive: 6 plays, 84 yards, 2:35.

Second quarter

- MASS – Derek Morris 39-yard field goal, 10:18. Golden Flashes 14–3. Drive: 22 plays, 54 yards, 7:23.
- KENT – Dashawn Martin 25-yard pass from Dru DeShields (Will Hryszko kick), 5:41. Golden Flashes 21–3. Drive: 10 plays, 75 yards, 4:33.
- MASS – Derek Morris 33-yard field goal, 0:00. Golden Flashes 21–6. Drive: 9 plays, 84 yards, 1:00.

Third quarter

- KENT – Terik Mulder 10-yard pass from Dru DeShields (Will Hryszko kick), 5:23. Golden Flashes 28–6. Drive: 16 plays, 80 yards, 6:18.
- KENT – Ardell Banks 34-yard pass from Dru DeShields (Will Hryszko kick), 4:07. Golden Flashes 35–6. Drive: 1 play, 34 yards, 0:06.
- KENT – Jordan Nubin 25-yard run (Will Hryszko kick), 3:22. Golden Flashes 42–6. Drive: 2 plays, 30 yards, 0:31.

Fourth quarter

- No scoring plays.

Statistics	MASS	KENT
First downs	21	17
Plays–yards	82–271	62–330
Rushes–yards	33–44	42–151
Passing yards	227	179
Passing: Comp–Att–Int	26–49–2	12–20–0
Turnovers	2	0
Time of possession	30:31	29:29

Team	Category	Player	Statistics
UMass	Passing	AJ Hairston	26/48, 227 yards, INT
UMass	Rushing	Brandon Hood	10 carries, 36 yards
UMass	Receiving	Jake McConnachie	7 receptions, 67 yards
Kent State	Passing	Dru DeShields	10/18, 148 yards, 4 TD
Kent State	Rushing	Jordan Nubin	15 carries, 80 yards, TD
Kent State	Receiving	Dashawn Martin	3 receptions, 42 yards, TD

=== at Toledo ===
Kent State Golden Flashes (2–4) at Toledo Rockets (3–3) – Game summary

Quarter	1	2	3	4	Total
Golden Flashes	10	0	0	0	10
Rockets	7	10	21	7	45

at Glass Bowl • Toledo, Ohio

- Date: October 18
- Game time: 2:00 p.m. EDT
- Game weather: Sunny • Temperature: 81 °F (27 °C) • Wind: SW at 11 miles per hour (18 km/h)
- Game attendance: 18,417
- Referee: Chris La Mange
- TV announcers (ESPN+): Shawn Kenney (play-by-play) and Ryan Cavanaugh (analyst)

Game information

First quarter

- (14:50) KENT – Cade Wolford 75-yard pass from Dru DeShields, Will Hryszko kick (Drive: 1 play, 75 yards, 0:10; KENT 7–0)
- (7:33) KENT – Will Hryszko 38-yard field goal (Drive: 11 plays, 45 yards, 5:51; KENT 10–0)
- (1:18) TOL – Trayvon Rudolph 58-yard pass from Tucker Gleason, Dylan Cunanan kick (Drive: 4 plays, 89 yards, 1:19; KENT 10–7)

Second quarter

- (12:31) TOL – Dylan Cunanan 28-yard field goal (Drive: 8 plays, 67 plays, 2:35; Tied 10–10)
- (0:32) TOL – Ryder Treadway 11-yard pass from Tucker GLeason, Dylan Cunanan kick (Drive: 11 plays, 81 yards, 3:34; TOL 17–10)

Third quarter

- (9:24) TOL – Junior Vandeross III 21-yard pass from Tucker Gleason, Dylan Cunanan kick (Drive: 4 plays, 51 yards, 1:18; TOL 24–10)
- (6:04) TOL – Javon Brown 16-yard pass from Tucker Gleason, Dylan Cunanan kick (Drive: 4 plays, 57 yards, 1:54; TOL 31–10)

Fourth quarter

- (10:00) TOL – Terrell Crosby Jr. 18-yard pass from Kalieb Osborne, Dylan Cunanan kick (Drive: 11 plays, 75 yards, 5:11; TOL 45–10)

Statistics	KENT	TOL
First downs	9	29
Plays–yards	50–224	72–552
Rushes–yards	26–65	40–178
Passing yards	159	374
Passing: Comp–Att–Int	12–24–1	25–32–0
Turnovers	1	0
Time of possession	26:12	33:48

Team	Category	Player	Statistics
Kent State	Passing	Dru DeShields	12/23, 159 yards, TD, INT
Kent State	Rushing	Jordan Nubin	13 carries, 61 yards
Kent State	Receiving	Cade Wolford	3 receptions, 87 yards, TD
Toledo	Passing	Tucker Gleason	21/28, 294 yards, 4 TD
Toledo	Rushing	Kenji Christian	16 carries, 113 yards
Toledo	Receiving	Trayvon Rudolph	5 receptions, 119 yards, TD

=== Bowling Green (Anniversary Award) ===
Bowling Green Falcons (3–4) at Kent State Golden Flashes (2–5) – Game summary

Quarter	1	2	3	4	Total
Falcons	7	7	7	0	21
Golden Flashes	0	3	14	7	24

at Dix Stadium • Kent, Ohio

- Date: October 25
- Game time: 12:00 p.m. EDT
- Game weather: Cloudy • Temperature: 50 °F (10 °C) • Wind: E at 2 miles per hour (3.2 km/h)
- Game attendance: 9,260
- Referee: William Williams
- TV announcers (ESPN+): Anthony Lima (play-by-play) and Doc Holliday (analyst)

Game information

First quarter

- (9:36) BGSU - Jacob Harris 13-yard pass from Baron May, Jackson Kleather kick (Drive: 9 plays, 61 yards, 3:41; BGSU 7-0)

Second quarter

- (6:12) KENT - Will Hryszko 35-yard field goal (Drive: 10 plays, 47 yards, 4:23; BGSU 7-3)
- (0:33) BGSU - Austin Dendy 1-yard run, Jackson Kleather kick (Drive: 11 plays, 75 yards, 5:39; BGSU 14-3)

Third quarter

- (8:47) BGSU - Baron May 1-yard run, Jackson Kleather kick (Drive: 13 plays, 75 yards, 6:13; BGSU 21-3)
- (6:24) KENT - Cade Wolford 29-yard pass from Dru DeShields, Will Hryszko kick (Drive: 7 plays, 79 yards, 2:18; BGSU 21-10)
- (4:23) KENT - Gavin Garcia 45-yard run, Will Hryszko kick (Drive: 1 play, 45 yards, 0:10; BGSU 21-17)

Fourth quarter

- (3:15) KENT - Wayne Harris 12-yard pass from Da'Realyst Clark, Will Hryszko kick (Drive: 7 plays, 62 yards, 3:34; KENT 24-21)

Statistics	BGSU	KENT
First downs	22	14
Plays–yards	78–379	51–294
Rushes–yards	50–207	28–122
Passing yards	172	172
Passing: Comp–Att–Int	14–28–0	14–23–0
Turnovers	0	0
Time of possession	36:52	23:08

Team	Category	Player	Statistics
Bowling Green	Passing	Baron May	12/22, 142 yards, TD
Bowling Green	Rushing	Austyn Dendy	20 carries, 93 yards, TD
Bowling Green	Receiving	Jyrin Johnson	3 receptions, 53 yards
Kent State	Passing	Dru DeShields	13/22, 160 yards, TD
Kent State	Rushing	Gavin Garcia	6 carries, 55 yards, TD
Kent State	Receiving	Cade Wolford	2 receptions, 66 yards, TD

=== at Ball State ===
Kent State Golden Flashes (3–5) at Ball State Cardinals (3–5) – Game summary

Quarter	1	2	3	4	Total
Golden Flashes	0	3	7	3	13
Cardinals	3	7	0	7	17

at Scheumann Stadium • Muncie, Indiana

- Date: November 5
- Game time: 7:00 p.m. EDT
- Game weather: Clear • Temperature: 52 °F (11 °C) • Wind: NW at 17 miles per hour (27 km/h)
- Game attendance: 5,225
- Referee: Rick Warne
- TV announcers (ESPNU): Matt Schumacker (play-by-play) and Dustin Fox (analyst)

Game information

First quarter

- (11:59) BALL – DC Pippin 25-yard field goal (Drive: 4 plays, 5 yards, 1:54; Ball State 3–0)

Second quarter

- (13:31) BALL – TJ Horton 1-yard pass from Kiael Kelly, DC Pippin kick (Drive: 13 plays, 50 yards, 6:34; Ball State 10–0)
- (6:18) KENT – Will Hryszko 39-yard field goal (Drive: 13 plays, 56 yards, 7:06; Ball State 10–3)

Third quarter

- (4:42) KENT – Donovan Delaney Jr. 4-yard run, Will Hryszko kick (Drive: 2 plays, 10 yards, 0:40; Tied 10–10)

Fourth quarter

- (11:07) KENT – Will Hryszko 28-yard field goal (Drive: 9 plays, 56 yards, 4:28; Kent State 13–10)
- (1:53) BALL – Kameron Anthony 29-yard pass from Kiael Kelly, DC Pippin kick (Drive: 4 plays, 37 yards, 1:52; Ball State 17–13)

Statistics	KENT	BALL
First downs	14	15
Plays–yards	61–301	62–238
Rushes–yards	33–89	33–65
Passing yards	212	173
Passing: Comp–Att–Int	15–28–1	17–29–0
Turnovers	1	0
Time of possession	27:42	32:18

Team	Category	Player	Statistics
Kent State	Passing	Dru DeShields	15/27, 212 yards
Kent State	Rushing	Gavin Garcia	12 carries, 59 yards
Kent State	Receiving	Wayne Harris	5 receptions, 87 yards
Ball State	Passing	Kiael Kelly	17/29, 173 yards, 2 TD
Ball State	Rushing	Kiael Kelly	21 carries, 53 yards
Ball State	Receiving	Kameron Anthony	2 receptions, 39 yards, TD

=== at Akron (Wagon Wheel) ===
Kent State Golden Flashes (3–6) at Akron Zips (4–6) – Game summary

Quarter	1	2	3	4	OT	Total
Golden Flashes	7	7	14	7	7	42
Zips	3	14	0	18	0	35

at InfoCision Stadium–Summa Field • Akron, Ohio

- Date: November 11
- Game time: 7:30 PM EST
- Game weather: Sunny • Temperature: 33 °F (1 °C) • Wind: at 21 miles per hour (34 km/h)
- Game attendance: 8,501
- Referee: Marcel Kerr
- TV announcers (ESPNU): Chuckie Kempf (play-by-play) and Darius Walker (analyst)

Game information

First quarter

- (8:43) AKR – Matthew Schramm 29-yard field goal (Drive: 9 plays, 63 yards, 4:43; AKR 3-0)
- (3:51) KENT – Gavin Garcia 3-yard run, Will Hryszko kick (Drive: 2 plays, 9 yards, 0:26; KENT 7-3)

Second quarter

- (7:51) AKR – Jordan Grant 4-yard run, Matthew Schramm kick (Drive: 8 plays, 90 yards, 4:11; AKR 10-7)
- (2:50) KENT – Da'Realyst Clark 89-yard pass from Dru DeShields, Will Hryszko kick (Drive: 1 play, 89 yards, 0:11; KENT 14-10)
- (0:10) AKR – Marcel Williams 30-yard pass from Ben Finley, Matthew Schramm kick, (Drive: 11 plays, 75 yards, 2:40; AKR 17-14)

Third quarter

- (8:52) KENT – Cade Wolford 43-yard pass from Dru DeShields, Will Hryszko kick (Drive: 7 plays, 77 yards, 2:38; KENT 21-17)
- (6:18) KENT – Terik Mulder 7-yard pass from Dru DeShields, Will Hryszko kick (Drive: 3 plays, 12 yards, 1:12; KENT 28-17)

Fourth quarter

- (14:04) KENT – DaShawn Martin 27-yard pass from Dru DeShields, Will Hryszko kick (Drive: 2 plays, 31 yards, 0:41; KENT 35-17)
- (10:53) AKR – Marcel Williams 12-yard pass from Ben Finley, Matthew Schramm kick (Drive: 10 plays, 75 yards, 3:11; KENT 35-24)
- (7:12) AKR – Matthew Schramm 20-yard field goal (Drive: 8 plays, 37 yards, 3:41; KENT 35-27)
- (1:59) AKR – Israel Polk 13-yard pass from Ben Finley, Ben Finley-Marcel Williams pass (Drive: 9 plays, 58 yards, 3:11; Tied 35-35)

Overtime

- KENT – Ardell Banks 25-yard pass from Dru DeShields, Will Hryszko kick (Drive: 1 play, 25 yards, 0:00; KENT 42-35)

Statistics	KENT	AKR
First downs	13	33
Plays–yards	47–374	95–530
Rushes–yards	22–57	36–106
Passing yards	317	424
Passing: Comp–Att–Int	17–25–0	32–59–1
Turnovers	1	2
Time of possession	21:20	38:40

Team	Category	Player	Statistics
Kent State	Passing	Dru DeShields	17/25, 317 yards, 5 TD
Kent State	Rushing	Gavin Garcia	7 carries, 39 yards, TD
Kent State	Receiving	DaShawn Martin	4 receptions, 71 yards, TD
Akron	Passing	Ben Finley	32/59, 424 yards, 3 TD, INT
Akron	Rushing	Jordan Gant	22 carries, 96 yards, TD
Akron	Receiving	Marcel Williams	14 receptions, 206 yards, 2 TD

=== Central Michigan ===
Central Michigan Chippewas (6–4) at Kent State Golden Flashes (4–6) – Game summary

Quarter	1	2	3	4	Total
Chippewas	7	7	0	14	28
Golden Flashes	0	3	0	13	16

at Dix Stadium • Kent, Ohio

- Date: November 19
- Game time: 7:00 PM EST
- Game weather: Partly cloudy • Temperature: 40 °F (4 °C) • Wind: N at 2 miles per hour (3.2 km/h)
- Game attendance: 8,112
- Referee: Billy Williams
- TV announcers (ESPNU): Jack Kizer (play-by-play) and Ryan Cavanaugh (analyst)

Game information

First quarter

- CMU – Tommy McIntosh 1-yard pass from Joe Labas (Cade Graham kick), 2:37. Chippewas 7–0. Drive: 18 plays, 75 yards, 10:53.

Second quarter

- CMU – Brock Townsend 2-yard run (Cade Graham kick), 10:24. Chippewas 14–0. Drive: 8 plays, 34 yards, 4:31.
- KENT – Will Hryszko 36-yard field goal, 0:53. Chippewas 14–3. Drive: 11 plays, 52 yards, 3:22.

Third quarter

- No scoring plays.

Fourth quarter

- KENT – Wayne Harris 59-yard punt return (pass failed), 10:38. Chippewas 14–9.
- CMU – Brock Townsend 10-yard run (Cade Graham kick), 4:41. Chippewas 21–9. Drive: 10 plays, 75 yards, 5:57.
- CMU – DeCorion Temple 19-yard pass from Joe Labas (Cade Graham kick), 3:02. Chippewas 28–9. Drive: 3 plays, 24 yards, 0:57.
- KENT – Dru DeShields 10-yard run (Will Hryszko kick), 1:28. Chippewas 28–16. Drive: 7 plays, 68 yards, 1:29.

Statistics	CMU	KENT
First downs	16	20
Plays–yards	65–297	64–274
Rushes–yards	43–174	36–89
Passing yards	123	185
Passing: Comp–Att–Int	12-22-1	14-28-0
Turnovers	1	1
Time of possession	33:21	26:39

Team	Category	Player	Statistics
Central Michigan	Passing	Joe Labas	11/20, 121 yards, 2 TD, INT
Central Michigan	Rushing	Nahree Biggins	12 carries, 61 yards
Central Michigan	Receiving	Decorion Temple	3 receptions, 34 yards
Kent State	Passing	Dru DeShields	14/28, 185 yards
Kent State	Rushing	Gavin Garcia	15 carries, 77 yards
Kent State	Receiving	Wayne Harris	3 receptions, 56 yards

=== at Northern Illinois ===
Kent State Golden Flashes (4–7) at Northern Illinois Huskies (3-8) – Game summary

Quarter	1	2	3	4	Total
Golden Flashes	3	14	3	15	35
Huskies	7	14	0	10	31

at Huskie Stadium • DeKalb, Illinois

- Date: November 28
- Game time: 11:00 AM CST
- Game weather: Sunny • Temperature: 28 °F (−2 °C) • Wind: SE at 11 miles per hour (18 km/h)
- Game attendance: 3,090
- Referee: Matt Packowski
- TV announcers (CBSSN): Dave Ryan (play-by-play) and Ben DiNucci (analyst)

Game information

First quarter

- KENT – Will Hryszko 34-yard field goal, 8:49. Golden Flashes 3–0. Drive: 6 plays, 23 yards, 2:32.
- NIU – Jalen Macon 2-yard run (Andrew Glass kick), 2:12. Huskies 7–3. Drive: 12 plays, 71 yards, 6:31.

Second quarter

- KENT – Terik Mulder 5-yard pass from Dru DeShields (Will Hryszko kick), 12:17. Golden Flashes 10–7. Drive: 9 plays, 81 yards, 4:50.
- NIU – Chavon Wright 38-yard run (Andrew Glass kick), 7:20. Huskies 14–10. Drive: 2 plays, 43 yards, 0:45.
- KENT – Da'Shawn Martin 17-yard pass from Dru DeShields (Will Hryszko kick), 4:15. Golden Flashes 17–14. Drive: 6 plays, 75 yards, 3:05.
- NIU – Jalen Macon 9-yard run (Andrew Glass kick), 0:47. Huskies 21–17. Drive: 10 plays, 75 yards, 3:28.

Third quarter

- KENT – Will Hryszko 28-yard field goal, 6:20. Huskies 21–20. Drive: 10 plays, 72 yards, 5:18.

Fourth quarter

- NIU – Andrew Glass 33-yard field goal, 14:16. Huskies 24–20. Drive: 13 plays, 55 yards, 6:58.
- NIU – Chavon Wright 1-yard run (Andrew Glass kick), 13:52. Huskies 31–20. Drive: 1 play, 1 yard, 0:05.
- KENT – Cade Wolford 31-yard run (Dru DeShields–Da'Shawn Martin pass), 10:23. Huskies 31–28. Drive: 7 plays, 67 yards, 3:23.
- KENT – Gavin Garcia 26-yard run (Will Hryszko kick), 4:11. Golden Flashes 35–31. Drive: 6 plays, 80 yards, 2:52.

Statistics	KENT	NIU
First downs	20	21
Plays–yards	58–438	68–334
Rushes–yards	36–231	58–307
Passing yards	207	27
Passing: Comp–Att–Int	11–22—1	5–10–0
Turnovers	2	1
Time of possession	28:09	31:51

Team	Category	Player	Statistics
Kent State	Passing	Dru DeShiels	11/22, 207 yards, 2 TD, INT
Kent State	Rushing	Gavin Garcia	24 carries, 151 yards, TD
Kent State	Receiving	Da'Shawn Martin	3 receptions, 91 yards, TD
Northern Illinois	Passing	Jalen Macon	5/10, 27 yards
Northern Illinois	Rushing	Chavon Wright	30 carries, 185 yards, 2 TD
Northern Illinois	Receiving	Jason Fowler	2 receptions, 14 yards
