= Arnoux =

Arnoux is a surname. Notable people with the surname include:

- Alexandre Arnoux, (1884–1973), French screenwriter
- Cody Arnoux, American association football player
- Elaine Badgley Arnoux (1926–2023), American visual artist
- Hippolyte Arnoux (1860–1890), French photographer and publisher
- Maurice Arnoux, World War I flying ace credited with five aerial victories
- René Arnoux (born 1948), retired French racing driver who is a veteran of 12 Formula One seasons (1978 to 1989)
- Shamar Arnoux, American football player
- Stanley Arnoux (born 1986), American football linebacker for the New Orleans Saints of the National Football League

== See also ==
- Arnoux system, railway device invented by Jean-Claude-Républicain Arnoux in 1838
- Château-Arnoux-Saint-Auban, commune in the region of Provence-Alpes-Côte d'Azur in south-eastern France
- Arnous, disambiguation
