= Tory Carter =

American football player (born 1999)

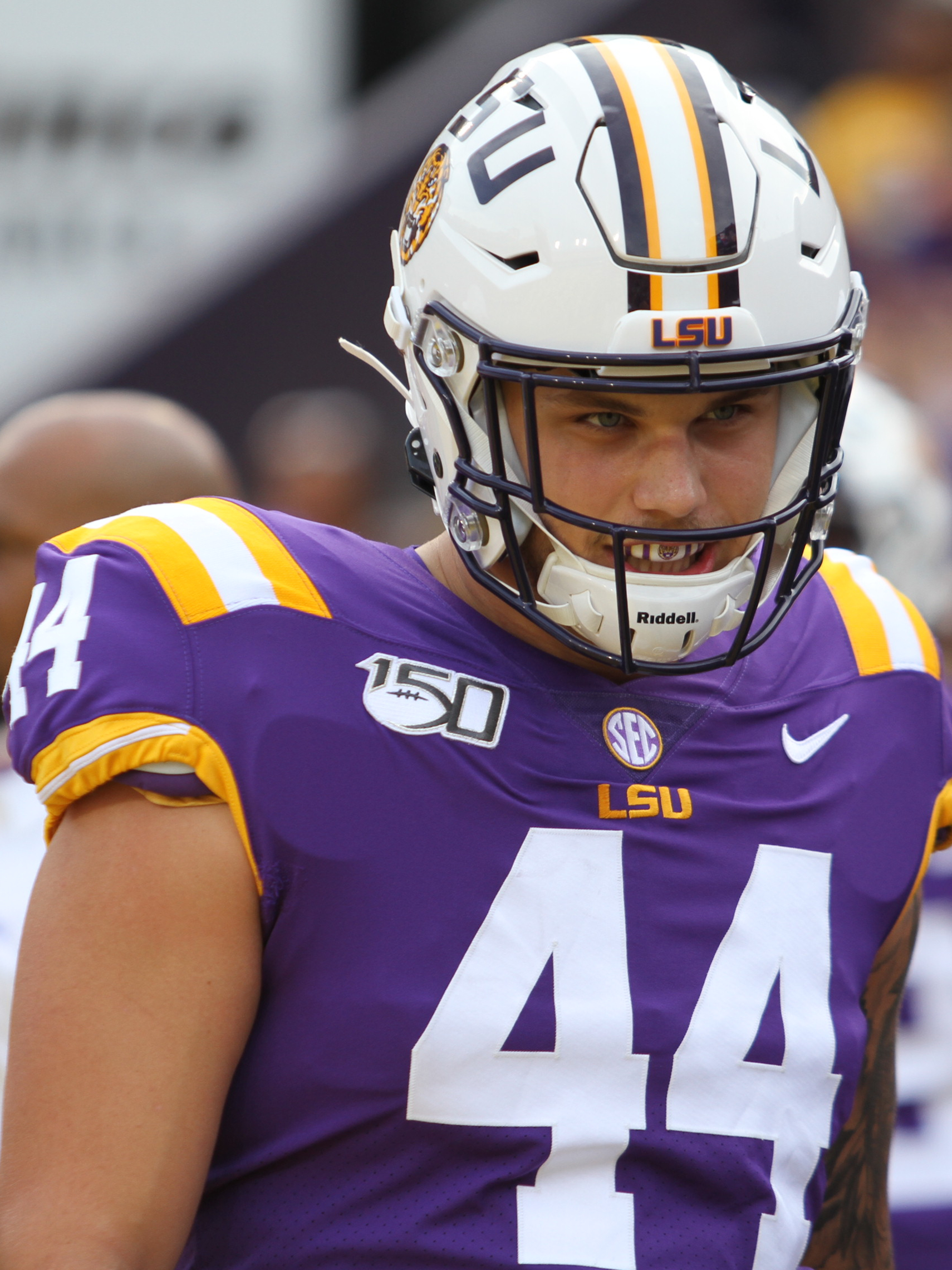
- Carter with the LSU Tigers in 2019

No. 44
- Position: Fullback

Personal information
- Born: March 16, 1999 (age 27); Valdosta, Georgia, U.S.
- Listed height: 6 ft 0 in (1.83 m)
- Listed weight: 229 lb (104 kg)

Career information
- High school: Lee County (Leesburg, Georgia)
- College: LSU (2017–2020)
- NFL draft: 2021: undrafted

Career history
- Tennessee Titans (2021–2022)

Awards and highlights
- CFP national champion (2019)
- Stats at Pro Football Reference

Tory Carter (born March 16, 1999) is an American former professional football fullback. He played in the National Football League (NFL) for the Tennessee Titans in 2021. He played college football for the LSU Tigers. Carter is currently the strength and conditioning coach for the Texas A&M Aggies.

== Early life ==
Carter grew up in Valdosta, Georgia, and attended Lee County High School.

== College career ==
Carter played for the LSU Tigers for four seasons. He played in 11 games and caught two passes for 15 yards as a junior as LSU won the 2020 College Football Playoff National Championship. Carter completed his collegiate career with two carries for four yards rushing and 16 receptions for 157 yards and two touchdowns in 42 games played.

== Professional career ==
Pre-draft measurables
Height	Weight	Arm length	Hand span	40-yard dash	10-yard split	20-yard split	20-yard shuttle	Three-cone drill	Vertical jump	Broad jump	Bench press
6 ft 0 3/8 in (1.84 m)	229 lb (104 kg)	30 5/8 in (0.78 m)	9 5/8 in (0.24 m)	4.88 s	1.74 s	2.84 s	4.38 s	7.21 s	35.5 in (0.90 m)	9 ft 4 in (2.84 m)	24 reps
All values from Pro Day

Carter was signed by the Tennessee Titans as an undrafted free agent on May 1, 2021. He was waived by Tennessee during final roster cuts on August 31, but was re–signed to the team's practice squad the next day. Carter was elevated to the active roster on September 26, for the team's Week 3 game against the Indianapolis Colts and made his NFL debut in the game. He was signed to the active roster on October 30. Carter was placed on injured reserve on December 18 after he suffered an ankle injury in the team's week 14 win against the Jacksonville Jaguars.

The Titans waived Carter on December 6, 2022.
