= Kevin Sperry =

American college football quarterback (born 2006)

No. 9 – Florida State Seminoles
- Position: Quarterback
- Class: Sophomore

Personal information
- Born: November 14, 2006 (age 19)
- Listed height: 6 ft 1 in (1.85 m)
- Listed weight: 210 lb (95 kg)

Career information
- High school: Rock Hill (Frisco, Texas); Carl Albert (Midwest City, Oklahoma); Guyer (Denton, Texas)
- College: Florida State (2025–present)
- Stats at ESPN

Kevin Sperry (born November 14, 2006) is an American college football quarterback for the Florida State Seminoles.

== Early life ==
Sperry is from Torrance, California. He grew up playing football, initially as a running back before becoming quarterback in eighth grade. He first attended Rock Hill High School in Frisco, Texas, where he played at quarterback. He was selected the District 5A-6A Newcomer of the Year as a sophomore when he threw for 1,527 yards and nine touchdowns while running for 657 yards and seven scores.

Sperry transferred to Carl Albert High School in Midwest City, Oklahoma, for his junior season, leading them to a 14–0 record and the state championship while passing for 2,564 yards and 31 touchdowns with only four interceptions. He then spent his senior year at Guyer High School in Denton, Texas, throwing for 2,523 yards and 27 touchdowns while running for 1,156 yards and eight touchdowns. Sperry was a participant at the Elite 11 finals. A four-star recruit, he initially committed to play college football for the Oklahoma Sooners, before flipping his commitment to the Florida State Seminoles.

== College career ==
Sperry joined Florida State as an early enrollee in 2025. He entered the season as a backup to Thomas Castellanos along with Brock Glenn. He made his debut in a win against the East Texas A&M Lions, throwing for 61 yards and two touchdowns.

=== Statistics ===
Season	Team	Games			Passing								Rushing			
Season	Team	GP	GS	Record	Cmp	Att	Pct	Yds	Y/A	TD	Int	Rtg	Att	Yds	Avg	TD
2025	Florida State	3	0	0–0	12	17	70.6	194	11.4	2	0	205.3	7	27	3.9	0
2026	Florida State	3	0	0–0	3	5	60.0	21	4.2	0	0	95.3	2	-8	-4.0	0
Career		6	0	0−0	15	22	68.2	215	9.8	2	0	180.3	9	19	2.1	0
