= Arnous =

Arnous may refer to:

- Hussein Arnous (born 1953), Syrian politician who has served as Prime Minister of Syria
- Jules Arnous de Rivière (1830–1905), French chess player

== See also ==
- Arnoux
