= Lee County High School (Georgia) =

Public school in Leesburg, Georgia, United States

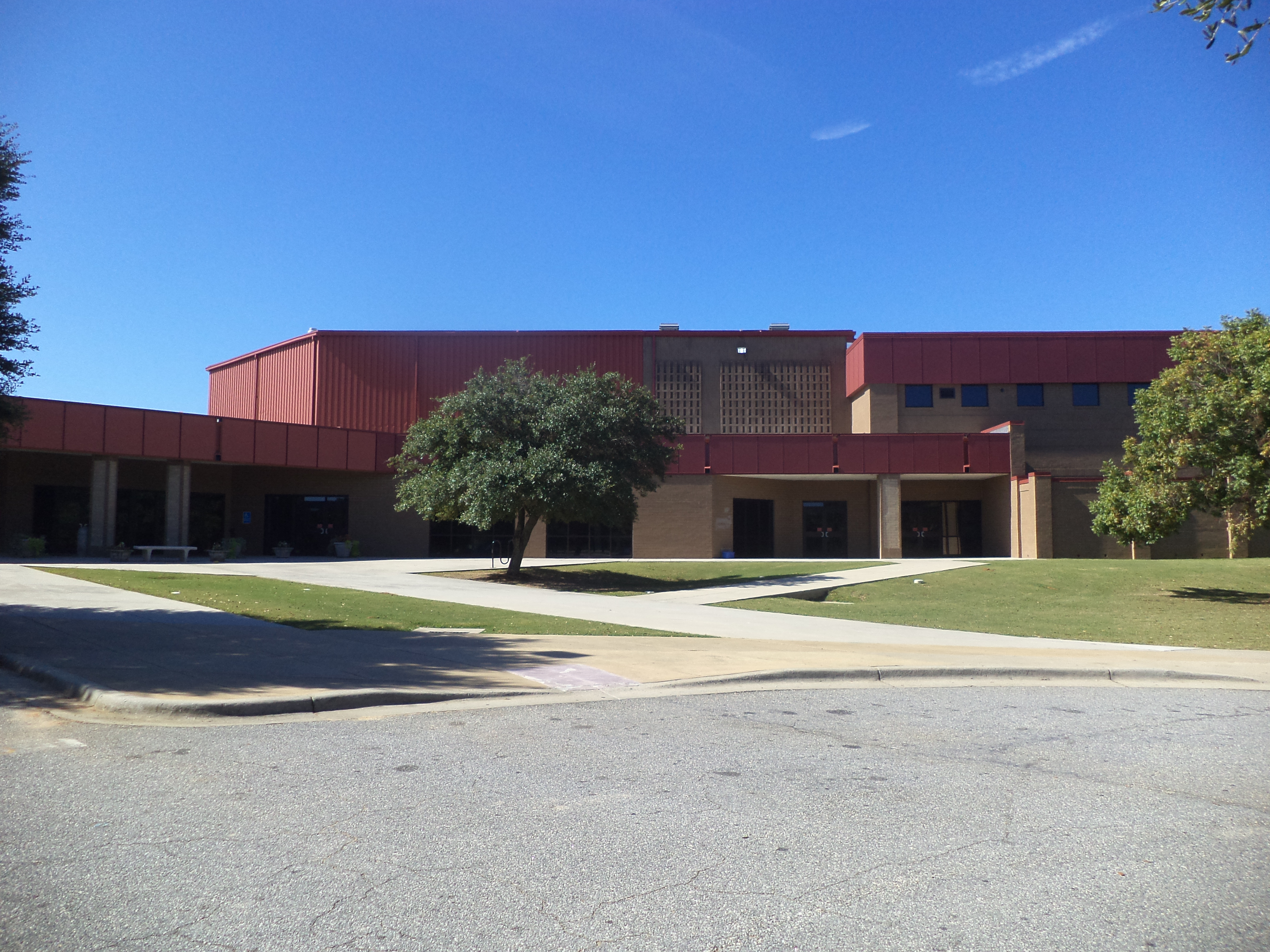

Location
- 1 Trojan Way; Leesburg, Georgia 31763-5712; United States; 31°43′56″N 84°09′41″W

Information
- School district: Lee County School District
- Principal: Melissa Edwards
- Teaching staff: 79.20 FTE
- Grades: 10 - 12
- Enrollment: 1,402 (2023-2024)
- Student to teacher ratio: 17.70
- Colors: Red, black, and white
- Athletics: GHSA
- Athletics conference: AAAAAA (6A) Region 1
- Team name: Trojans
- Newspaper: The Panoptic
- Website: School website

Lee County High School is a public school located in Leesburg, Georgia, United States. The mascot is the Trojan and the school colors are red and black.

LCHS has achieved Adequate Yearly Progress for seven years in a row and is part of the Lee County School District, which is one of only a few school systems in the state of Georgia to earn AYP for six years in a row.

Kevin Dowling served as the principal of the school from June 2006 to Fall 2016.

Karen Hancock took over from Kevin Dowling as principal in the fall of 2016. As for the 2024/2025 school year, Karen Hancock has stated, she will retire in May 2025. She will be placed by Melissa Edwards, former Principal of Worth County High School, for the new school years, waiting ahead for her.

In 2008 the Lee County High School 9th Grade Campus was opened, which freshmen attend for one year before transitioning to the upper campus. The principal of the LCHS 9th Grade Campus is Ginger Lawrence.

== Academics ==
The school offers a wide variety of classes and career pathway opportunities. In addition to its academic commitment, the school has been recognized for its outstanding leaders. Principal Kevin Dowling was named the 2012 Georgia Principal of the Year. In 2010, LCHS was listed by Newsweek as one of "America's Best High Schools".

=== AP and Honors courses ===
The school offers several Advanced Placement and Honors classes. While the AP classes change year by year, the school typically offers AP Calculus AB, AP English Language and Composition, AP English Literature and Composition, AP Music Theory, AP Physics, AP Psychology, AP Statistics, AP US History, and AP World History. The school also offers AP Human Geography at the 9th Grade Campus.

== Extracurricular activities ==
Students can spend their out-of-class time in the following extracurricular activities.

=== Athletics ===
- Football
- Boys'/girls' soccer
- Boys'/girls' cross country
- Boys'/girls' track
- Boys'/girls' basketball
- Boys'/girls' tennis
- Boys'/girls' golf
- Baseball
- Softball
- Swim team
- Wrestling
- Girls' volleyball
- Cheerleading (competition, football, and basketball)
- Marching band color guard
- Marching band drumline
- NJROTC color guard
- NJROTC Drill team
- NJROTC Rifle team
- NJROTC Orentering team

=== Fine arts ===
Theatre arts: The school competes in the annual One Act Play competition. The drama department produces five plays each year, including musicals. Most of the plays are performed in the school's Robert A. Clay Auditorium.

Band: The Lee County High School Band Program includes a GRAND CHAMPION marching band, three concert bands, and a jazz ensemble.

=== Publications and broadcasting ===
The school newspaper is The Panoptic. The Trojan Yearbook is published every year.

=== Speech and debate ===
The school has a highly successful speech and debate program that competes in competitions across Georgia and the nation. The team has advanced competitors to the National Forensic League Speech and Debate Tournament every year since 2008 and the National Catholic Forensic League Grand National Tournament every year since 2009. At the 2013 Georgia Forensic Coaches Association (GFCA) Varsity State Championship, the team won the President's Cup, an award given to the school with the most cumulative rounds in the state tournament, as well as the third place overall sweepstakes award. The team has seen its competitors advance to octofinal, quarterfinal, semifinal, and even final rounds at Wake Forest University, University of Florida, Emory University, Duke University, the Tournament of Champions, the Grand National Tournament and the National Speech and Debate Tournament. The school is chartered with the National Forensic League, the National Catholic Forensic League and the GFCA.

=== Official GHSA State Titles ===
- Boys' Basketball (1) - 1985(3A)
- Football (2) - 2017(6A), 2018(6A)

=== Other GHSA State Titles ===
- Literary (4) - 1978(A), 1988(2A), 1998(3A), 1999(3A)
- One Act Play (3) - 1999(3A), 2000(5A), 2015(6A)

== Notable alumni ==
- Luke Bryan - country music singer and songwriter
- Tory Carter - NFL player for the Tennessee Titans
- Ousmane Kromah - college football running back for the Florida State Seminoles
- Phillip Phillips - winner of the eleventh season of American Idol
- Buster Posey - Professional baseball catcher 2009-2021, 2012 MLB National League MVP, 2010 MLB National League Rookie of the Year, three-time World Series Champion, first round draft pick of the San Francisco Giants. Catcher for the Florida State Seminoles baseball team 2006-2008. Baseball executive, San Francisco Giants President of Baseball Operations since September 2024.
- D'Vontrey Richardson - former two-sport athlete at Florida State University. Minor league baseball player within the Milwaukee Brewers organization.
- Jammie Robinson - NFL safety for the Carolina Panthers
