= Jammie Robinson =

American football player (born 2001)

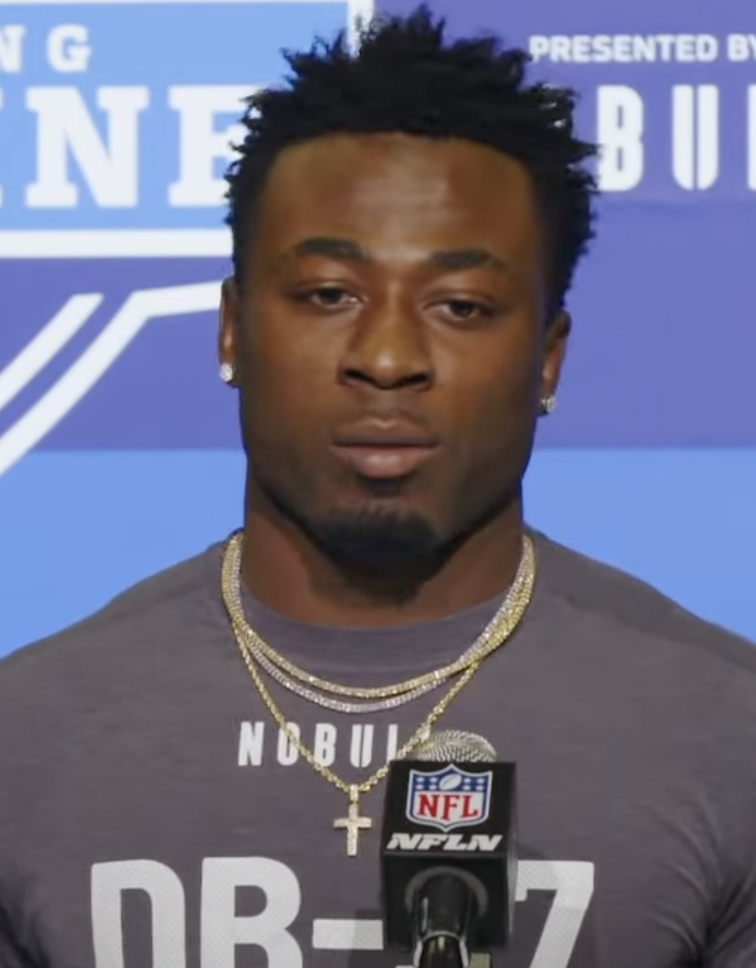
- Robinson at the 2023 NFL Combine

No. 34 – Atlanta Falcons
- Position: Safety
- Roster status: Practice squad

Personal information
- Born: January 24, 2001 (age 25); Cordele, Georgia, U.S.
- Listed height: 5 ft 11 in (1.80 m)
- Listed weight: 200 lb (91 kg)

Career information
- High school: Lee County (Leesburg, Georgia)
- College: South Carolina (2019–2020); Florida State (2021–2022)
- NFL draft: 2023: 5th round, 145th overall pick

Career history
- Carolina Panthers (2023–2024); Arizona Cardinals (2024); Kansas City Chiefs (2025)*; Detroit Lions (2025); Atlanta Falcons (2025–present)
- * Offseason or practice squad member only

Awards and highlights
- Second-team All-American (2022); 2× First-team All-ACC (2021, 2022); Freshman All-SEC Team (2019)

Career NFL statistics as of 2024
- Total tackles: 20
- Stats at Pro Football Reference

Jammie L. Robinson (born January 24, 2001) is an American professional football safety for the Atlanta Falcons of the National Football League (NFL). He played college football for the South Carolina Gamecocks and Florida State Seminoles.

== Early life ==
Robinson grew up in Cordele, Georgia, and attended Crisp County High School before transferring to Lee County High School as a senior. He was rated a four-star recruit and committed to play college football at South Carolina over offers from Auburn, Kentucky, and Tennessee.

== College career ==
Robinson began his career at South Carolina. He was named a starter for the Gamecocks entering his freshman year and was named to the Southeastern Conference (SEC) All-Freshman team. Robinson had 74 tackles with two tackles for loss, four passes broken up, and one interception as a sophomore. Robinson transferred to Florida State in 2021. He led the Seminoles with 85 tackles and four interceptions in his first season with the team.

== Professional career ==
Pre-draft measurables
Height	Weight	Arm length	Hand span	Wingspan	40-yard dash	10-yard split	20-yard split	20-yard shuttle	Three-cone drill	Vertical jump	Broad jump	Bench press
5 ft 10 5/8 in (1.79 m)	191 lb (87 kg)	29 5/8 in (0.75 m)	8 3/4 in (0.22 m)	6 ft 0 1/4 in (1.84 m)	4.59 s	1.58 s	2.62 s	4.41 s	6.89 s	33.5 in (0.85 m)	9 ft 8 in (2.95 m)	23 reps
All values from NFL Combine/Pro Day

=== Carolina Panthers ===
The Carolina Panthers selected Robinson with the 145th overall pick in the fifth round of the 2023 NFL draft. As a rookie, he appeared in 15 games and made two starts. He recorded 17 total tackles in the 2023 season.

Robinson was waived by the Panthers on December 13, 2024.

=== Arizona Cardinals ===
On December 16, 2024, Robinson was claimed off waivers by the Arizona Cardinals.

On August 26, 2025, Robinson was waived by the Cardinals as part of final roster cuts.

=== Kansas City Chiefs ===
On August 29, 2025, Robinson was signed to the Kansas City Chiefs' practice squad.

=== Detroit Lions ===
On October 16, 2025, the Detroit Lions signed Robinson off of the Chiefs' practice squad. He was waived on November 8.

=== Atlanta Falcons ===
On November 12, 2025, Robinson signed with the Atlanta Falcons' practice squad. He was promoted to the active roster on December 19.

On August 31, 2026, Robinson was waived by the Falcons. On September 2, Atlanta re–signed Robinson to their practice squad. On October 10, he was signed to the active roster but released five days later. On October 17, Robinson was signed to the practice squad.
