= Mark Carney (American football) =

American football coach (born 1980)

Current position
- Title: Head coach
- Team: Kent State
- Conference: MAC
- Record: 8–15
- Annual salary: $450,000

Biographical details
- Born: July 31, 1980 (age 46); Cleveland, Ohio, U.S.

Playing career
- 1998–2001: Fordham
- Position: Quarterback

Coaching career (HC unless noted)
- 2002–2003: Fordham (SA)
- 2004–2008: Richmond (QB/WR)
- 2009–2013: Bowling Green (WR)
- 2014: Baldwin Wallace (OC/QB)
- 2015–2018: Virginia State (OC/QB)
- 2019: Charlotte (QB)
- 2020–2022: Charlotte (OC/QB)
- 2023: Kent State (TE/IWR)
- 2024: Kent State (OC)
- 2025–present: Kent State

Head coaching record
- Overall: 8–15

Accomplishments and honors

Awards
- Second Team All-Patriot League (2001)

Mark A. Carney (born July 31, 1980) is an American college football coach and former quarterback who is the head football coach at Kent State University. Carney played college football at Fordham University from 1998 to 2001.

Carney was born in Cleveland, Ohio. He attended high school in Lakewood, Ohio, graduating from St. Edward High School. After graduation from high school in 1998, Carney enrolled at the Fordham University and played quarterback for the Rams, starting for two seasons. As a senior in 2001, he led Fordham to their first winning record at the Division I-AA level.

Carney began his coaching career in 2002 as a student assistant coach at Fordham for his former head coach, Dave Clawson. After Clawson left for a jobs with Richmond where he worked with the quarterbacks and wide receivers. In 2008, Mike London took over as the head coach of the Spiders, and kept Carney on staff, where he helped lead the Spiders to the FCS national championship. He moved to Bowling Green in 2009, where he re-joined Clawson's staff until 2013, where he took his first offensive coordinator position with Baldwin Wallace for a single season before spending 4 season as the offensive coordinator for Virginia State. In 2019, he joined his former player, Will Healy's coaching staff at Charlotte, first as quarterbacks coach before being promoted to offensive coordinator. Carney would next move to Kent State in 2023, coaching tight ends before being promoted to offensive coordinator in 2024.

Carney accepted the job as head football coach for Kent State University in 2025. Carney led the team to a 5-game improvement in his first year as head coach.

== Playing career ==
Carney played high school football at St. Edward High School and then was an honorable mention All-American quarterback for Fordham.

=== College statistics ===
Fordham Rams
Season	Games			Passing								Rushing			
Season	GP	GS	Record	Comp	Att	Yds	Pct	TD	Int	Avg	QBR	Att	Yds	Avg	TD
1998	0	0	0–0	0	0	0	–	0	0	–	–	0	0	–	0
1999	7	3	0–3	78	153	796	51.0	5	8	5.2	95.01	28	-72	-2.6	1
2000	1	0	0–0	0	0	0	–	0	0	–	–	1	-8	-8.0	0
2001	11	11	7–4	213	344	2,700	61.9	27	11	7.8	147.35	57	42	0.7	2
Totals	19	14	7–7	291	497	3,496	58.6	32	19	7.0	131.24	86	-38	0	3

== Coaching career ==
Carney began his coaching career as a student assistant for his alma mater, Fordham, working with the quarterbacks.

From 2004 to 2008, Carney was the wide receivers coach at Richmond. He was a member of the 2008 NCAA Division I FCS national championship team.

In 2009, Carney was hired as the wide receivers coach for Bowling Green.

In 2014, Carney accepted his first offensive coordinator position for Baldwin Wallace. From 2015 to 2018, he was the offensive coordinator for the Virginia State.

In 2019, Carney was hired as the quarterbacks coach for Charlotte. In 2020, he was promoted to the offensive coordinator position.

In 2023, Carney was named the tight ends coach at Kent State. He was promoted to offensive coordinator after the season. On March 27, 2025, Carney was named interim head coach, while head coach Kenni Burns was placed on administrative leave. Kent State fired Burns on April 11 and confirmed Carney as the interim head coach.

On October 30, 2025, after a 3–5 start that included its first win since 2023 and first victory over a FBS opponent since 2022, Kent State announced that it had removed the interim tag from Carney, officially making him the program's head coach.

== Head coaching record ==
Year	Team	Overall	Conference	Standing	Bowl/playoffs
Kent State Golden Flashes (Mid-American Conference) (2025–present)
2025	Kent State	5–7	4–4	T–6th	
2026	Kent State	3–8	2–5		
Kent State:		8–15	6–9		
Total:		8–15			
