= Ousmane Kromah =

American football player

No. 32 – Florida State Seminoles
- Position: Running back
- Class: Sophomore

Personal information
- Born: Liberia
- Listed height: 6 ft 1 in (1.85 m)
- Listed weight: 218 lb (99 kg)

Career information
- High school: Lee County (Leesburg, Georgia)
- College: Florida State (2025–present)
- Stats at ESPN

Ousmane Kromah (oos-MAHN) is an American college football running back for the Florida State Seminoles.

== Early life ==
Kromah was born in Liberia, his mother, Elizabeth Teah, moved him and his family to Georgia when he was young. Kromah attended Lee County High School in Leesburg, Georgia. As a sophomore he rushed for 1,504 yards on 181 carries with 20 touchdowns and 1,783 yards on 182 carries with 20 touchdowns his junior year. As a senior, he rushed 168 times for 1,356 yards and 15 touchdowns. For his career, Kromah had 4,643 rushing yards and 55 touchdowns and was the Region 1-6A Player of the Year in both his junior and senior seasons.

Kromah was a four-star recruit and was ranked among the best running backs in his class. He originally committed to play college football at the University of Georgia before flipping his commitment to Florida State University.

== College career ==
Kromah competed for immediate playing time his freshman year in 2025.
