= Tony White (gridiron football) =

American football player and coach (born 1979)

No. 36, 45, 44
- Title: Linebacker

Personal information
- Born: March 22, 1979 (age 47); Key West, Florida, U.S.
- Listed height: 6 ft 1 in (1.85 m)
- Listed weight: 250 lb (113 kg)

Career information
- Position: Linebacker (No. 45, 36, 44)
- High school: Burges (El Paso, Texas)
- College: UCLA
- NFL draft: 2002: undrafted

Career history

Playing
- Buffalo Bills (2002)*; Calgary Stampeders (2002)*; Ottawa Renegades (2003–2004); Hamilton Tiger-Cats (2005)
- * Offseason or practice squad member only

Coaching
- St. Genevieve HS (CA) (2006) Head coach; UCLA (2007) Graduate assistant; New Mexico (2008) Linebackers coach; San Diego State (2009–2010) Cornerbacks coach; San Diego State (2011–2017) Cornerbacks coach & recruiting coordinator; Arizona State (2018–2019) Cornerbacks coach & defensive passing game coordinator; Arizona State (2019) Defensive coordinator & secondary coach; Syracuse (2020–2022) Defensive coordinator; Nebraska (2023–2024) Defensive coordinator; Florida State (2025–2026) Defensive coordinator

Career CFL statistics
- Games played: 16
- Total tackles: 46
- Sacks: 2.0

Anthony Dewayne White II (born March 22, 1979) is an American football coach and former linebacker who was most recently the defensive coordinator for the Florida State Seminoles. He played three seasons in the Canadian Football League (CFL) as a member of the Ottawa Renegades and the Hamilton Tiger-Cats before getting into coaching.

== Early life ==
White was born in Key West, Florida to an American father and a Korean mother, who met when his father was in the U.S. military serving overseas in Korea. After spending most of his youth in New York City with his mother, he moved to El Paso, Texas and lived with his father for a year before moving in with the family of his best friend after his father was reassigned to San Antonio.

White attended and played football at Burges High School in El Paso, and originally committed to play college football at Oklahoma State. He then de-committed and committed to UCLA after then-Bruins defensive coordinator Rocky Long offered him a spot on the team at the recommendation of El Paso native and then-UCLA commit Ed Stansbury.

== College career ==
At UCLA, White was a three-year starter praised by the coaching staff for acting as an "on-field coach", as well as the ability to break down an opponent on film and pay attention to whom the Bruins were recruiting.

== Professional career ==
After going undrafted in the 2002 NFL draft, White signed with the Buffalo Bills for training camp but did not make the roster. He also had a preseason stint with the Calgary Stampeders but did not make the roster.

=== Ottawa Renegades ===
White was signed by the Ottawa Renegades in 2003. After getting cut by the Renegades, he was quickly re-signed by the team and played the 2003 and 2004 seasons with them before getting released in 2005.

=== Hamilton Tiger-Cats ===
White was signed by the Hamilton Tiger-Cats in 2005, playing three games with the team.

== Coaching career ==
After one season as the head coach at St. Genevieve High School in Los Angeles, White joined the coaching staff at his alma mater UCLA as a graduate assistant for football operations. He was hired as the linebackers coach at New Mexico in 2008 on the coaching staff of Rocky Long, his former defensive coordinator from his playing days at UCLA.

=== San Diego State ===
White was hired as the cornerbacks coach at San Diego State on January 27, 2009, weeks after Long was hired as the program's defensive coordinator. He was retained and added the title of recruiting coordinator when Long was promoted to head coach in 2011.

=== Arizona State ===
White was named the cornerbacks coach and defensive passing game coordinator at Arizona State on January 5, 2018, joining former San Diego State defensive coordinator Danny Gonzales, who was hired as the Sun Devils defensive coordinator a few weeks prior.

White was promoted to defensive coordinator before the final game of the 2019 season and served as the defensive play-caller for the Sun Devils in their appearance in the Sun Bowl after Gonzales departed Arizona State for the head coaching position at New Mexico.

=== Syracuse ===
White was named the defensive coordinator at Syracuse on February 7, 2020 under Dino Babers, who he worked with when he was a graduate assistant at UCLA.

=== Nebraska ===
White was named the defensive coordinator at Nebraska on December 8, 2022.

=== Florida State ===
White was named the Defensive Coordinator at Florida State on December 2, 2024. He was fired November 1, 2026.

== Personal life ==
White and his wife Angela have two children, Anthony III and Ava.
