= Shamar Arnoux =

American football player

No. 14 – Auburn Tigers
- Position: Cornerback
- Class: Sophomore

Personal information
- Listed height: 6 ft 2 in (1.88 m)
- Listed weight: 189 lb (86 kg)

Career information
- High school: Carrollton (Carrollton, Georgia)
- College: Florida State (2025); Auburn (2026–present)
- Stats at ESPN

Shamar Arnoux is an American football cornerback for the Auburn Tigers. He previously played for the Florida State Seminoles.

== Early life ==
Arnoux played for Carrollton High School. According to 247Sports, he was rated as the number 383 overall prospect in his recruiting class, as well as the number 37 cornerback following his senior season.

== College career ==
Arnoux originally committed to the Tennessee Volunteers in April 2023. He decommitted from the school in February 2024. He then committed to the USC Trojans, but again flipped his commitment, this time to the Auburn Tigers in November 2024. In January 2025, he made his final decision to decommit from Auburn and instead join Florida State.

=== Florida State ===
Arnoux played his first career game against the East Texas A&M Lions. He finished the season with 27 tackles and one pass deflection through 11 games played and four starts. He entered the transfer portal in January 2026.

=== Auburn ===
Arnoux committed to the Auburn Tigers on January 12, 2026.
