= Micahi Danzy =

American football player

No. 8 – Florida State Seminoles
- Position: Wide receiver
- Class: Redshirt Sophomore

Personal information
- Listed height: 6 ft 1 in (1.85 m)
- Listed weight: 189 lb (86 kg)

Career information
- High school: Florida State University School (Tallahassee, Florida)
- College: Florida State (2024–present)
- Stats at ESPN

Micahi Danzy is an American football wide receiver for the Florida State Seminoles.

== Early life ==
Danzy attended Florida State University School in Tallahassee, Florida. He played running back in high school and as a junior rushed for 1,809 yards and 17 touchdowns. He played in only five games his senior season due to injury. For his career Danzy had 3,019 yards and 39 touchdowns. He committed to Florida State University to play college football. Danzy also ran track in high school and won the 400-meter dash at the 2023 USATF National Junior Olympic Track & Field Championships.

== College career ==
Danzy played in four games as a running back his first year at Florida State in 2024 and redshirted. He ended the season with five rushing yards and 38 receiving yards on one reception. He switched the wide receiver his redshirt freshman season in 2025.

Danzy also competes in track and field for the Seminoles. He set an ACC and school record with 44.38 in the 400-meter at the 2025 ACC championship.
