= 2025 Utah State Aggies football team =

American college football season

2025 Utah State Aggies football

Famous Idaho Potato Bowl, L 21–34 vs. Washington State
- Conference: Mountain West Conference
- Record: 6–7 (4–4 MW)
- Head coach: Bronco Mendenhall (1st season)
- Offensive coordinator: Kevin McGiven (1st season)
- Offensive scheme: Spread option
- Defensive coordinator: Nick Howell (1st season)
- Base defense: 3–3–5
- Home stadium: Maverik Stadium

2025 Mountain West Conference football standings
	Conf.			Overall
Team	W		L	W		L
Boise State y$	6	–	2	9	–	5
UNLV y	6	–	2	10	–	4
San Diego State	6	–	2	9	–	4
New Mexico	6	–	2	9	–	4
Fresno State	5	–	3	9	–	4
Hawaii	5	–	3	9	–	4
Utah State	4	–	4	6	–	7
Air Force	3	–	5	4	–	8
Nevada	2	–	6	3	–	9
Wyoming	2	–	6	4	–	8
San Jose State	2	–	6	3	–	9
Colorado State	1	–	7	2	–	10
Championship: Boise State 38, UNLV 21
$ – Conference champion; y – Championship game participant; Rankings from CFP Rankings

The 2025 Utah State Aggies football team represented the Utah State University in the Mountain West Conference during the 2025 NCAA Division I FBS football season. The Aggies were led by head coach Bronco Mendenhall in his first year with the program. The Aggies played their home games at Maverik Stadium, located in Logan, Utah.

The 2025 season was the final season in the Mountain West Conference as Utah State moved to the Pac-12 Conference in 2026.

== Offseason ==
=== Transfers ===
==== Outgoing ====
Player	Position	Destination
Avante Dickerson	DB	Arkansas State
Malik McConico	S	Arkansas State
Max Alford	LB	BYU
Macyo "Taz" Williams	DL	Charlotte
Jack Hestera	WR	Colorado
Jaiden Francois	DB	Duke
Jadon Pearson	LB	Fresno State
Simeon Harris	S	Fresno State
Marlin Dean	DL	Georgia State
Robert Freeman IV	WR	Idaho State
D.J. Graham II	DB	Kansas
Shively Asoau Fua	OL	Mary
Mason Edwards	DB	McNeese
Braydon Bailey	DL	Montana
Manase Tupou	DT	Montana State–Northern
Teague Andersen	OL	NC State
Cian Slone	DE	NC State
Herschel Turner	RB	Nevada
Gabe Peterson	DE	New Mexico State
Alexander McDougall	LS	Norco
Miguel Jackson	DL	Northwestern
Ricky Lolohea	DL	Oklahoma
Grayson Brousseau	TE	Oklahoma State
Will Monney	TE	Oklahoma State
Blaine Spires	DE	Pittsburgh
Tanner Williams	LB	San Diego State
Rahsul Faison	RB	South Carolina
Aloali'i Maui	OL	Southern Miss
Grant Page	WR	Southern Miss
Robert Briggs	RB	Southern Miss
Kadiyon Sweat	S	Southern Utah
Seni Tuiaki	DT	Southern Utah
Chase Davis	S	Texas State
JD Drew	DB	Tulsa
Teeg Slone	S	UC Davis
Antoineo Harris Jr.	EDGE	UConn
Otto Tia	WR	Utah
Ryan Marks	P	Utah Tech
Logan Pili	LB	Utah Tech
Tanner Cragun	K	UTEP
Gavin Barthiel	LB	Washington State
Braden Siri	QB	Wayne State
Collin Vaughn	DL	Youngstown State
Terrell Taylor	S	Unknown
Nick Floyd	RB	Unknown
Quentin Riley	WR	Unknown
Will Safris	K	Unknown
William Holmes	DE	Withdrawn

==== Incoming ====
Player	Position	Previous school
Anthony Garcia	QB	Arizona
Jake Eichorn	OL	BYU
Miles Davis	WR	BYU
Landon Rehkow	P	BYU
Chika Ebunoha	S	BYU
Carson Tujague	DT	BYU
Nu'uletau Sellesin	OLB	BYU
Jackson Nelson	OL	BYU
John Gayer	EDGE	California
Carter Brown	K	Cincinnati
Dylan Tucker	CB	Elon
Owen Edwards	LS	Hampton
Carlos Orr-Gillespie	WR	Illinois
Tyree Morris	DL	Lafayette
Craig McDonald	S	Minnesota
Will Safris	P	Missouri
D'Andre Barnes	DB	Nebraska
Antoineo Harris Jr.	DE	New Mexico
Noah Avinger	DB	New Mexico
Bobby Arnold III	DB	New Mexico
D'Angelo Mayes	WR	New Mexico
Hyrum Hatch	LS	New Mexico
Bryson Taylor	S	New Mexico
Javen Jacobs	RB	New Mexico
Naki Fahina	DT	New Mexico State
Jimmy Liston	IOL	Purdue
Brady Boyd	WR	Texas Tech
Braden Pegan	WR	UCLA
Corey Thompson Jr.	WR	UNLV
Brevin Hamblin	S	Utah Tech
Demick Starling	WR	Western Kentucky

=== Coaching staff additions ===
Name	Position	Previous Team	Previous Position	Source
Bronco Mendenhall	Head coach	New Mexico	Head coach	
Kevin McGiven	Offensive coordinator/Quarterbacks	San Jose State	Wide receivers/Passing game coordinator	
Nick Howell	Defensive coordinator	New Mexico	Defensive coordinator	
Shane Hunter	Special teams/Linebackers	New Mexico	Special teams/Linebackers	
Mario Acitelli	Offensive line/Run game coordinator	William & Mary	Offensive coordinator/Offensive line	
DeNarius McGhee	Wide receivers/Passing game coordinator	New Orleans Saints	Assistant wide receivers	
Kirk Garner	Running backs	New Mexico	Running backs	
Matt Johns	Quarterbacks	New Mexico	Tight ends	
Jan Jorgensen	Outside linebackers	New Mexico	Edge	
Charles Mack	Cornerbacks	New Mexico	Defensive backs	
Donte Wilkins	Defensive line	New Mexico	Defensive line	

== Preseason ==
=== Mountain West media poll ===
The Mountain West's preseason prediction poll was released on July 16, 2025. Utah State was predicted to finish in ninth place in the conference.

== Schedule ==
Date	Time	Opponent	Site	TV	Result	Attendance
August 30	5:30 p.m.	UTEP*	Maverik Stadium; Logan, UT	CBSSN	W 28–16	16,448
September 6	10:45 a.m.	at No. 19 Texas A&M*	Kyle Field; College Station, TX	SECN	L 22–44	100,026
September 13	7:45 p.m.	Air Force	Maverik Stadium; Logan, UT	FS1	W 49–30	17,124
September 20	6:00 p.m.	McNeese*	Maverik Stadium; Logan, UT	KMYU	W 48–7	16,273
September 27	10:45 a.m.	at No. 18 Vanderbilt*	FirstBank Stadium; Nashville, TN	SECN	L 35–55	33,688
October 11	9:59 p.m.	at Hawaii	Clarence T. C. Ching Athletics Complex; Honolulu, HI	Scripps Sports	L 26–44	13,023
October 17	7:00 p.m.	San Jose State	Maverik Stadium; Logan, UT	CBSSN	W 30–25	22,710
October 25	1:00 p.m.	at New Mexico	University Stadium; Albuquerque, NM	Altitude	L 14–33	20,097
November 8	5:30 p.m.	Nevada	Maverik Stadium; Logan, UT	CBSSN	W 51–14	19,418
November 15	5:00 p.m.	at UNLV	Allegiant Stadium; Paradise, NV	CBSSN	L 26–29 ^{2OT}	31,682
November 22	8:30 p.m.	at Fresno State	Valley Children's Stadium; Fresno, CA	CBSSN	W 28–17	37,551
November 28	2:00 p.m.	Boise State	Maverik Stadium; Logan, UT	CBS	L 24–25	21,115
December 22	12:00 p.m.	vs. Washington State*	Albertsons Stadium; Boise, ID (Famous Idaho Potato Bowl)	ESPN	L 21–34	17,031
*Non-conference game; Rankings from AP Poll - Released prior to game; All times are in Mountain time

== Personnel ==
2025 Utah State Aggies football team roster
Players
Coaches
Offense

Pos.	#	Name	Class
RB	2	Miles Davis	Sr
QB	3	Jacob Conover	GS
WR	5	Brady Boyd	Sr
WR	6	Demick Starling	Sr
WR	7	Kahanu Davis	Sr
RB	8	Javen Jacobs	Jr
QB	10	Anthony Garcia	So
WR	11	Braden Pegan	Jr
QB	12	C. J. Tiller	So
WR	15	Ty Olsen	Fr
QB	16	Bryson Barnes	GS
WR	17	Cade Baker	So
TE	18	Kache Kaio	So
TE	19	Chase Tuatagaloa	Jr
WR	20	Tate Kjar	Fr
RB	22	Derrick Jameson	Jr
RB	23	Noah White	Fr
RB	28	Nehemiah Washington	Fr
OL	51	Kauasi Hansen	Fr
OL	53	Jarvis Griffiths	So
OL	55	Jimmy Liston	So
OL	56	Jake Eichorn	Sr
OL	57	Trey Andersen	Sr
OL	61	K'leyone Iosua	So
OL	62	Jr Sia	So
OL	65	Tavo Motu'apuaka	Jr
OL	67	Adam Pond	Jr
OL	72	George Maile	Jr
OL	73	Elia Migao	Sr
WR	81	Nikko Boncore	Fr
TE	83	Josh Sterzer	GS
TE	87	Broc Lane	GS
OL		Sam Brousseau	Fr
QB		Kaden Cox	Fr
TE		Alex Faiivae	Fr
OL		Camden Jury	Fr
RB		Tre Kofe	Fr
RB		Ravian Larry	Fr
TE		Kyle Lively	Fr
WR		Kaleb Mitchell	Fr
OL		Jackson Nelson	Fr
WR		Jackson Olsen	So
WR		Carlos Orr-Gillespie	Fr
OL		Jared Pele	Sr
OL		Jared Smith	Fr
RB		Clyde Taulapapa	Fr
WR		Corey Thompson Jr.	Jr
OL		Caysen Whittaker	Fr

Defense

Pos.	#	Name	Class
OLB	0	Enoka Migao	Sr
CB	1	Noah Avinger	Sr
S	4	Brevin Hamblin	Jr
DT	9	Tyree Morris	Jr
DT	10	Gabriel Iniguez Jr.	Sr
CB	11	Bryson Taylor	Sr
S	12	Bobby Arnold	Jr
CB	13	E. J. Fisk	Jr
ILB	14	Bronson Olevao Jr.	Jr
CB	15	D'Angelo Mayes	So
ILB	17	Mataira Brown	So
S	19	Lava Vailahi	Fr
ILB	20	John Miller	Sr
CB	21	Noah Flores	So
CB	22	Courage Ugo	Jr
S	23	Titan Saxton	So
OLB	24	William Holmes	So
ILB	25	Chris Joe	Fr
S	26	D'Andre Barnes	So
ILB	27	Blake Barnes	Fr
S	27	Chika Ebunoha	Jr
DT	28	Carson Tujague	Fr
S	29	Gio Kafentzis	Fr
CB	30	Jack Hadfield	Fr
ILB	31	Dakota Howell	Fr
S	32	Charger Doty	Fr
ILB	33	Luke Durfey	Fr
CB	34	Dylan Tucker	Sr
ILB	36	Tymere Burton	So
CB	38	John Shepard	Jr
OLB	40	Zion Andreasen	So
OLB	41	Carl Nesmith	Sr
OLB	42	Nu'uletau Sellesin	Sr
DT	44	Bo Maile	Sr
DT	47	Naki Fahina	Sr
OLB	55	Tevita Tuha	Jr
OLB	58	John Gayer	Jr
DT	59	Cole Keele	So
DT	94	Kone Aumua-Uiagalelei	Jr
OLB	95	Paxton Naegle	Fr
ILB		Sampson Alofipo	Jr
S		Jonathan Baird	Jr
ILB		Diego Grateron	Jr
CB		Abe Jager	Fr
OLB		Tanner Jolley	So
S		Ike Larsen	Sr
ILB		Ryker Lotulelei	Fr
ILB		Beau McGiven	Fr
S		Breaker Mendenhall	So
DT		Joshua Papu	Fr
DT		Stockton Pyne	Fr
DT		Iverson Report	Fr
DT		Bryan Vogl	So

Special teams

Pos.	#	Name	Class
LS	13	Hyrum Hatch	So
K	14	Tanner Rinker	Jr
P	16	Landon Rehkow	So
K	21	Carter Brown	Jr
P	37	Dylan Sprague	So
LS	43	Owen Edwards	So
P	90	Zachary Robbins	Fr

Head coach

- Bronco Mendenhall

Coordinators/assistant coaches

- Kevin McGiven – Offensive coordinator
- Nick Howell – Defensive coordinator/safeties
- Shane Hunter – Special teams coordinator/linebackers
- Mario Acitelli – Offensive line/run game coordinator
- Kirk Garner – Running backs
- Matt Johns – Quarterbacks
- Jan Jorgensen – Outside linebackers
- Charles Mack – Cornerbacks
- DeNarius McGhee – Wide receivers/pass game coordinator
- Donte Wilkins – Defensive line
- Ali'i Niumatalolo – Senior analyst/tight ends
- Kody Cooke – Head strength coach
- Brett Arkelian – Special teams analyst
- Austin Gatewood – Senior defensive analyst
- Christopher Howell – Defensive analyst
- Josh Clifford – Junior analyst/skill assistant
- Nick Grant – Junior defensive analyst
- Chris Peace – Junior defensive analyst
- Cade Rohrbough – Junior offensive analyst
- Jray Galeai – Junior defensive analyst
- Stine Emrick – Assistant strength coach
- Richard Burney Jr. – Assistant strength coach
- Kevin Griffin – Assistant strength coach

Legend

- (C) Team captain
- (S) Suspended
- (I) Ineligible
- Injured
- Redshirt

Roster
Last update: 08/23/25

== Game summaries ==
=== UTEP ===
Game One – UTEP Miners (0–0) at Utah State Aggies (0–0) – Game summary

Quarter	1	2	3	4	Total
Miners	7	3	0	6	16
Aggies	10	10	8	0	28

at Maverik Stadium • Logan, UT

- Date: Saturday August 30, 2025
- Game time: 5:30 PM
- Game attendance: 16,448
- Referee: Patrick Foy
- TV announcers (CBSSN): Fran Charles (play-by-play), Taylor McHargue (analyst), and Hailey Sutton (sideline reporter)

Game information

First quarter

- USU – Tanner Rinker 49-yard field goal, 9:48. Aggies 3–0. Drive: 11 plays, 49 yards, 5:09.
- UTEP – Kenny Odom 34-yard pass from Malachi Nelson (Carlos Arrelola kick), 4:30. Miners 7–3. Drive: 4 plays, 61 yards, 1:08.
- USU – Miles Davis 58-yard run (Tanner Rinker kick), 0:18. Aggies 10–7. Drive: 1 play, 58 yards, 0:12.

Second quarter

- USU – Tanner Rinker 28-yard field goal, 8:36. Aggies 13–7. Drive: 12 plays, 62 yards, 4:52.
- USU – Broc Lane 52-yard pass from Bryson Barnes (Tanner Rinker kick), 1:56. Aggies 20–7. Drive: 5 plays, 80 yards, 1:43.
- UTEP – Carlos Arrelola 42-yard field goal, 0:02. Aggies 20–10. Drive: 11 plays, 56 yards, 1:49.

Third quarter

- USU – Bryson Barnes 12-yard run (Anthony Garcia run), 8:35. Aggies 28–10. Drive: 7 plays, 93 yards, 2:37.

Fourth quarter

- UTEP – Ashten Emery 2-yard run (pass failed), 13:48. Aggies 28–16. Drive: 9 plays, 69 yards, 2:29.

Statistics	UTEP	USU
First downs	19	18
Plays–yards	71–284	61–360
Rushes–yards	35–103	33–127
Passing yards	181	233
Passing: Comp–Att–Int	23–36–1	19–28–0
Turnovers	1	0
Time of possession	29:23	30:37

Team	Category	Player	Statistics
UTEP	Passing	Malachi Nelson	22/34, 178 yards, TD, INT
UTEP	Rushing	Kam Thomas	16 carries, 36 yards
UTEP	Receiving	Kenny Odom	9 receptions, 97 yards, TD
Utah State	Passing	Bryson Barnes	19/28, 233 yards, TD
Utah State	Rushing	Miles Davis	12 carries, 88 yards, TD
Utah State	Receiving	Miles Davis	6 receptions, 61 yards

=== at No. 19 Texas A&M ===
Utah State Aggies (1–0) at No. 19 Texas A&M Aggies (1–0) – Game summary

Quarter	1	2	3	4	Total
Utah State	6	0	8	8	22
No. 19 Texas A&M	10	20	7	7	44

at Kyle Field • College Station, TX

- Date: September 6, 2025
- Game time: 11:45 a.m. CDT
- Game weather: Cloudy, 82 °F (28 °C)
- Game attendance: 100,026
- Referee: Jeff Heaser
- TV announcers (SECN): Taylor Zarzour (play-by-play), Matt Stinchcomb (analyst), and Alyssa Lang (sideline reporter)

Game information

First quarter

- TA&M – Terry Bussey 34-yard pass from Marcel Reed (Jared Zirkel kick), 10:51. Texas A&M 7–0. Drive: 3 plays, 55 yards, 1:14.
- USU – Miles Davis 3-yard pass from Anthony Garcia (pass failed), 7:02. Texas A&M 7–6. Drive: 9 plays, 75 yards, 3:49.
- TA&M – Jared Zirkel 37-yard field goal, 2:55. Texas A&M 10–6. Drive: 8 plays, 55 yards, 4:07.

Second quarter

- TA&M – Marcel Reed 1-yard run (Jared Zirkel kick), 12:01. Texas A&M 17–6. Drive: 10 plays, 63 yards, 3:55.
- TA&M – Le'Veon Moss 21-yard run (Jared Zirkel kick), 3:18. Texas A&M 24–6. Drive: 6 plays, 63 yards, 3:19.
- TA&M – KC Concepcion 12-yard pass from Marcel Reed (kick failed), 0:16. Texas A&M 30–6. Drive: 8 plays, 77 yards, 1:25.

Third quarter

- USU – Braden Pegan 16-yard pass from Bryson Barnes (Bryson Barnes pass to Javen Jacobs), 12:45. Texas A&M 30–14. Drive: 7 plays, 75 yards, 2:15.
- TA&M – KC Concepcion 8-yard pass from Marcel Reed (Jared Zirkel kick), 6:07. Texas A&M 37–14. Drive: 9 plays, 80 yards, 4:31.

Fourth quarter

- TA&M – Mario Craver 72-yard pass from Miles O'Neil (Jared Zirkel kick), 13:36. Texas A&M 44–14. Drive: 4 plays, 83 yards, 1:40.
- USU – Miles Davis 1-yard pass from Bryson Barnes (Bryson Barnes pass to Braden Pegan), 4:24. Texas A&M 44–22. Drive: 8 plays, 67 yards, 3:21.

Statistics	USU	TA&M
First downs	18	30
Plays–yards	66–250	79–554
Rushes–yards	35–78	45–235
Passing yards	172	319
Passing: comp–att–int	16–31–0	22–34–1
Turnovers	1	1
Time of possession	25:46	34:14

Team	Category	Player	Statistics
Utah State	Passing	Bryson Barnes	15/30, 169 yards, 2 TD
Utah State	Rushing	Miles Davis	10 carries, 50 yards
Utah State	Receiving	Brady Boyd	6 receptions, 87 yards
Texas A&M	Passing	Marcel Reed	19/28, 220 yards, 3 TD
Texas A&M	Rushing	Le'Veon Moss	10 carries, 68 yards, TD
Texas A&M	Receiving	Mario Craver	5 receptions, 114 yards, TD

=== Air Force ===
Air Force Falcons (1–0) at Utah State Aggies (1–1) – Game summary

Quarter	1	2	3	4	Total
Falcons	0	10	6	14	30
Aggies	7	7	21	14	49

at Maverik Stadium • Logan, UT

- Date: September 13, 2025
- Game time: 9:45 p.m. MDT
- Game weather: Sunny
- Game attendance: 17,124
- Referee: Gary Reed
- TV announcers (FS1): Trent Rush (play-by-play) and Petros Papadakis (analyst)

Game information

First quarter

- (10:04) USU – Bryson Barnes 7-yard run, Tanner Rinker kick (Drive: 5 plays, 27 yards, 2:23; Utah State 7–0)

Second quarter

- (14:46) AFA – Jacob Medina 31-yard field goal (Drive: 12 plays, 39 yards, 5:38; Utah State 7–3)
- (13:02) USU – Braden Pegan 54-yard pass from Bryson Barnes, Tanner Rinker kick (Drive: 6 plays, 88 yards, 1:44; Utah State 14–3)
- (9:04) AFA – Liam Szarka 1-yard run, Jacob Medina kick (Drive: 8 plays, 75 yards, 3:59; Utah State 14–10)

Third quarter

- (12:36) USU – Anthony Garcia 17-yard run, Tanner Rinker kick (Drive: 6 plays, 75 yards, 2:24; Utah State 21–10)
- (9:19) USU – Bryson Barnes 11-yard run, Tanner Rinker kick (Drive: 5 plays, 73 yards, 1:49; Utah State 28–10)
- (2:21) AFA – Owen Allen 1-yard run (Drive: 13 plays, 75 yards, 6:58; Utah State 28–16)
- (0:25) USU – Braden Pegan 38-yard pass from Bryson Barnes, Tanner Rinker kick (Drive: 5 plays, 75 yards, 1:56; Utah State 35–16)

Fourth quarter

- (12:30) AFA – Liam Szarka 1-yard run, Cade Harris rush (Drive: 6 plays, 75 yards, 2:55; Utah State 35–24)
- (3:58) USU – Bryson Barnes 7-yard run, Tanner Rinker kick (Drive: 7 plays, 33 yards, 2:41; Utah State 42–24)
- (1:34) AFA – Liam Szarka 11-yard run (Drive: 8 plays, 75 yards, 2:19; Utah State 42–30)
- (1:20) USU – Javen Jacobs 52-yard run, Tanner Rinker kick (Drive: 2 plays, 52 yards, 0:14; Utah State 49–30)

Statistics	AFA	USU
First downs	23	22
Plays–yards	84–445	56–473
Rushes–yards	61–266	34–186
Passing yards	179	287
Passing: Comp–Att–Int	11–23–2	17–22–0
Turnovers	3	0
Time of possession	38:11	21:49

Team	Category	Player	Statistics
Air Force	Passing	Josh Johnson	5/9, 112 yards, INT
Air Force	Rushing	Cade Harris	8 carries, 72 yards
Air Force	Receiving	Cade Harris	2 receptions, 63 yards
Utah State	Passing	Bryson Barnes	17/22, 287 yards, 2 TD
Utah State	Rushing	Javen Jacobs	9 carries, 71 yards, TD
Utah State	Receiving	Braden Pegan	7 receptions, 147 yards, 2 TD

=== McNeese (FCS) ===
McNeese Cowboys (FCS) (1–2) at Utah State Aggies (2–1) – Game summary

Quarter	1	2	3	4	Total
Cowboys (FCS)	0	7	0	0	7
Aggies	13	21	14	0	48

at Maverik Stadium • Logan, UT

- Date: September 20, 2025
- Game time: 6:00 p.m. MDT
- Game weather: Sunny • Temperature: 76 °F (24 °C) • Wind: N 4 mph
- Game attendance: 16,273
- Referee: Brad Carrell
- TV announcers (KMYU): Dave Fox (play-by-play), Alema Harrington (analyst) and Frank Dolce (sideline)

Game information

First quarter

- (5:46) USU – Kahanu Davis 45-yard pass from Bryson Barnes (Drive: 6 plays, 61 yards, 2:03; Utah State 6–0)
- (3:54) USU – Brady Boyd 53-yard pass from Bryson Barnes, Tanner Rinker kick (Drive: 2 plays, 58 yards, 0:37; Utah State 13–0)

Second quarter

- (7:55) USU – Miles Davis 30-yard run, Tanner Rinker kick (Drive: 4 plays, 46 yards, 1:02; Utah State 20–0)
- (5:59) MCN – Jonathan Harris 20-yard pass from Jake Strong, Fabrizio Pinton kick (Drive: 4 plays, 75 yards, 1:56; Utah State 20–7)
- (1:33) USU – Bryson Barnes 3-yard run, Tanner Rinker kick (Drive: 10 plays, 75 yards, 4:26; Utah State 27–7)
- (0:22) USU – Javen Jacobs 1-yard run, Tanner Rinker kick (Drive: 5 plays, 52 yards, 0:43; Utah State 34–7)

Third quarter

- (9:37) USU – Bryson Barnes 21-yard run, Tanner Rinker kick (Drive: 8 plays, 69 yards, 4:03; Utah State 41–7)
- (3:34) USU – Brady Boyd 9-yard pass from Bryson Barnes, Tanner Rinker kick (Drive: 4 plays, 89 yards, 1:50; Utah State 48–7)

Fourth quarter

- No scoring plays.

Statistics	MCN	USU
First downs	13	27
Plays–yards	68–239	75–627
Rushes–yards	40–109	47–334
Passing yards	130	293
Passing: Comp–Att–Int	11–28–0	19–28–1
Turnovers	0	2
Time of possession	28:46	31:14

Team	Category	Player	Statistics
McNeese	Passing	Jake Strong	7/23, 89 yards, TD
McNeese	Rushing	Tre'Vonte Citizen	12 carries, 71 yards
McNeese	Receiving	Jonathan Harris	1 reception, 20 yards, TD
Utah State	Passing	Bryson Barnes	19/27, 293 yards, 3 TD, INT
Utah State	Rushing	Bryson Barnes	13 carries, 128 yards, 2 TD
Utah State	Receiving	Braden Pegan	3 receptions, 95 yards

=== at No. 18 Vanderbilt ===
Utah State Aggies (3–1) at No. 18 Vanderbilt Commodores (4–0) – Game summary

Quarter	1	2	3	4	Total
Aggies	7	14	0	14	35
No. 18 Commodores	7	24	17	7	55

at FirstBank Stadium • Nashville, TN

- Date: September 27, 2025
- Game time: 11:45 a.m. CDT
- Game weather: Scattered clouds, 83°F
- Game attendance: 33,688
- Referee: Jason Autrey
- TV announcers (SECN): Taylor Zarzour (play-by-play), Matt Stinchcomb (analyst), and Alyssa Lang (sideline reporter)

Game information

First quarter

- USU – Miles Davis 18-yard pass from Bryson Barnes (Tanner Rinker kick), 7:45. Aggies 7–0. Drive: 8 plays, 75 yards, 3:55.
- VAN – Junior Sherrill 21-yard pass from Diego Pavia (Brock Taylor kick), 1:29. Tied 7–7. Drive: 9 plays, 59 yards, 6:07.

Second quarter

- USU – Josh Sterzer 10-yard pass from Bryson Barnes (Tanner Rinker kick), 11:22. Aggies 14–7. Drive: 10 plays 75, 5:07.
- VAN – Diego Pavia 6-yard run (Brock Taylor kick), 6:14. Tied 14–14. Drive: 8 plays, 65 yards, 5:08.
- VAN – Junior Sherrill 18-yard pass from Diego Pavia (Brock Taylor kick), 2:18. Commodores 21–14. Drive: 6 plays, 58 yards, 2:14.
- VAN – Junior Sherrill 18-yard pass from Diego Pavia (Brock Taylor kick), 1:20. Commodores 28–14. Drive: 3 plays, 60 yards, 0:23.
- USU – Braden Pegan 9-yard pass from Bryson Barnes (Tanner Rinker kick), 0:20. Commodores 28–21. Drive: 5 plays, 75 yards, 1:00.
- VAN – Brock Taylor 46-yard field goal, 0:00. Commodores 31–21. Drive: 2 plays, 33 yards, 0:15.

Third quarter

- VAN – Eli Stowers 10-yard pass from Diego Pavia (Brock Taylor kick), 9:32. Commodores 38–21. Drive: 11 plays, 75 yards, 5:28.
- VAN – Brock Taylor 31-yard field goal, 4:13. Commodores 41–21. Drive: 8 plays, 21 yards, 3:47.
- VAN – Richie Hoskins 53-yard pass from Diego Pavia (Brock Taylor kick), 1:19. Commodores 48–21. Drive: 5 plays, 89 yards, 2:03.

Fourth quarter

- USU – Brady Boyd 14-yard pass from Jacob Conover (Tanner Rinker kick), 8:23. Commodores 48–28. Drive: 2 plays, 72 yards, 0:51.
- VAN – Makhilyn Young 15-yard run (Justin Dewers kick), 5:21. Commodores 55–28. Drive: 6 plays, 75 yards, 3:02.
- USU – Javen Jacobs 6-yard pass from Jacob Conover (Tanner Rinker kick), 0:55. Commodores 55–35. Drive: 12 plays, 75 yards, 4:26.

Statistics	USU	VAN
First downs	21	31
Plays–yards	63–393	65–543
Rushes–yards	25–119	30–222
Passing yards	274	321
Passing: comp–att–int	28-38-0	26-35-1
Turnovers	1	1
Time of possession	26:43	33:17

Team	Category	Player	Statistics
Utah State	Passing	Bryson Barnes	15-22, 161 yards, 3 TD
Utah State	Rushing	Javen Jacobs	4 carries, 63 yards
Utah State	Receiving	Broc Lane	7 receptions, 98 yards
Vanderbilt	Passing	Diego Pavia	26-34, 321 yards, 5 TD, INT
Vanderbilt	Rushing	Diego Pavia	9 carries, 79 yards, TD
Vanderbilt	Receiving	Junior Sherrill	6 receptions, 91 yards, 3 TD

=== at Hawaii ===
Utah State Aggies (3–2) at Hawaii Rainbow Warriors (4–2) – Game summary

Quarter	1	2	3	4	Total
Aggies	3	17	6	0	26
Rainbow Warriors	10	14	3	17	44

at Clarence T.C. Ching Athletics Complex • Honolulu, HI

- Date: October 11, 2025
- Game time: 9:59 p.m.
- Game weather: Sunny, 81 °F (27 °C)
- Game attendance: 13,023
- Referee: Nolan Dumas
- TV announcers (Spectrum Sports): Kanoa Leahey (play-by-play) and Rich Miano (analyst)

Game information

First quarter

- (8:53) HAW – Kansei Matsuzawa 31-yard field goal (Drive: 7 plays, 26 yards, 3:24; Hawaii 3–0)
- (4:31) USU – Tanner Rinker 20-yard field goal (Drive: 11 plays, 73 yards, 4:22; Tied 3–3)
- (2:27) HAW – Pofele Ashlock 18-yard pass from Micah Alejado, Kansei Matsuzawa kick (Drive: 4 plays, 75 yards, 2:04; Hawaii 10–3)

Second quarter

- (9:36) USU – Miles Davis 2-yard run, Tanner Rinker kick (Drive: 7 plays, 47 yards, 2:27; Tied 10–10)
- (8:11) USU – Javen Jacobs 30-yard pass from Anthony Garcia, Tanner Rinker kick (Drive: 1 play, 30 yards, 0:08; Utah State 17–10)
- (5:45) HAW – Pofele Ashlock 7-yard pass from Micah Alejado, Kansei Matsuzawa kick (Drive: 6 plays, 75 yards, 2:26; Tied 17–17)
- (1:05) USU – Tanner Rinker 40-yard field goal (Drive: 11 plays, 64 yards, 1:50; Utah State 20–17)
- (0:24) HAW – Pofele Ashlock 31-yard pass from Micah Alejado, Kansei Matsuzawa kick (Drive: 6 plays, 75 yards, 0:41; Hawaii 24–20)

Third quarter

- (14:01) USU – Broc Lane 32-yard pass from Bryson Barnes, Tanner Rinker kick blocked (Drive: 3 plays, 44 yards, 0:59; Utah State 26–24)
- (3:20) HAW – Kansei Matsuzawa 46-yard field goal (Drive: 9 plays, 38 yards, 3:20; Hawaii 27–26)

Fourth quarter

- (11:55) HAW – Micah Alejado 15-yard run, Kansei Matsuzawa kick (Drive: 11 plays, 81 yards, 4:56; Hawaii 34–26)
- (7:47) HAW – Kansei Matsuzawa 36-yard field goal (Drive: 7 plays, 45 yards, 2:49; Hawaii 37–26)
- (3:48) HAW – Landon Sims 4-yard run, Kansei Matsuzawa kick (Drive: 6 plays, 36 yards, 2:57; Hawaii 44–26)

Statistics	USU	HAW
First downs	20	26
Plays–yards	66–435	83–546
Rushes–yards	29–166	29–133
Passing yards	269	413
Passing: Comp–Att–Int	19–37–1	34–54–1
Turnovers	2	1
Time of possession	25:59	34:01

Team	Category	Player	Statistics
Utah State	Passing	Bryson Barnes	14/26, 175 yards, TD, INT
Utah State	Rushing	Miles Davis	15 carries, 102 yards, TD
Utah State	Receiving	Braden Pegan	3 receptions, 84 yards
Hawaii	Passing	Micah Alejado	34/54, 413 yards, 3 TD, INT
Hawaii	Rushing	Landon Sims	10 carries, 86 yards, TD
Hawaii	Receiving	Jackson Harris	7 receptions, 117 yards

=== San Jose State ===
San Jose State Spartans (2–4) at Utah State Aggies (3–3) – Game summary

Quarter	1	2	3	4	Total
Spartans	3	6	10	6	25
Aggies	7	3	14	6	30

at Maverik Stadium • Logan, UT

- Date: October 17, 2025
- Game time: 7:00 p.m. MDT
- Game attendance: 22,710
- Referee: Cal McNeill
- TV announcers (CBSSN): Chris Lewis (play-by-play) and Kyle Long (analyst)

Game information

First quarter

- SJSU – Denis Lynch 37-yard field goal, 10:28. Spartans 3–0. Drive: 12 plays, 56 yards, 4:35.
- USU – Braden Pegan 2-yard run (Tanner Rinker kick), 4:00. Aggies 7–3. Drive: 14 plays, 75 yards, 6:27.

Second quarter

- SJSU – Lamar Radcliffe 15-yard pass from Walker Eget (Mathia Brown kick failed), 1:07. Spartans 9–7. Drive: 7 plays, 89 yards, 2:28.
- USU – Tanner Rinker 31-yard field goal, 0:03. Aggies 10–9. Drive: 9 plays, 62 yards, 0:56.

Third quarter

- USU – Anthony Garcia 74-yard pass from Bryson Barnes (Tanner Rinker kick), 13:55. Aggies 17–9. Drive: 3 plays, 75 yards, 1:17.
- SJSU – Steve Chavez-Soto 65-yard run (Mathias Brown kick), 12:32. Aggies 17–16. Drive: 3 plays, 75 yards, 1:21.
- USU – Bryson Barnes 2-yard run (Tanner Rinker kick), 8:20. Aggies 24–16. Drive: 10 plays, 75 yards, 4:06.
- SJSU – Denis Lynch 35-yard field goal, 1:10. Aggies 24–19. Drive: 14 plays, 58 yards, 7:07.

Fourth quarter

- SJSU – Leland Smith 45-yard pass from Walker Eget (pass failed), 11:56. Spartans 25–24. Drive: 5 plays, 60 yards, 0:51.
- USU – Tanner Rinker 45-yard field goal, 6:13. Aggies 27–25. Drive: 14 plays, 48 yards, 5:39.
- USU – Tanner Rinker 44-yard field goal, 1:58. Aggies 30–25. Drive: 6 plays, 21 yards, 1:48.

Statistics	SJSU	USU
First downs	23	19
Plays–yards	77–534	70–461
Rushes–yards	27–194	38–130
Passing yards	340	331
Passing: Comp–Att–Int	27–50–0	23–32–0
Turnovers	1	0
Time of possession	30:13	29:47

Team	Category	Player	Statistics
San Jose State	Passing	Walker Eget	27/49, 340 yards, 2 TD
San Jose State	Rushing	Steve Chavez-Soto	11 carries, 102 yards, TD
San Jose State	Receiving	Leland Smith	4 receptions, 116 yards, TD
Utah State	Passing	Bryson Barnes	22/31, 326 yards, TD
Utah State	Rushing	Bryson Barnes	16 carries, 54 yards, TD
Utah State	Receiving	Anthony Garcia	3 receptions, 121 yards, TD

=== at New Mexico ===
Utah State Aggies (4–3) at New Mexico Lobos (4–3) – Game summary

Quarter	1	2	3	4	Total
Aggies	0	7	0	7	14
Lobos	7	19	0	7	33

at University Stadium • Albuquerque, NM

- Date: October 25, 2025
- Game time: 1:00 p.m.
- Game attendance: 20,097
- Referee: Kenneth Ray
- TV announcers (Altitude): Robert Portnoy (play-by-play) and DonTrell Moore (analyst)

Game information

First quarter

- UNM – D.J. McKinney 49-yard punt return (Luke Drzewiecki kick), 9:14. Lobos 7–0.

Second quarter

- UNM – D.J. McKinney 1-yard run (Luke Drzewiecki kick), 13:29. Lobos 14–0. Drive: 13 plays, 80 yards, 6:54.
- UNM – Jaxton Eck safety, 9:02. Lobos 16–0.
- UNM – Luke Drzewiecki 41-yard field goal, 5:59. Lobos 19–0. Drive: 7 plays, 34 yards, 2:55.
- USU – Miles Davis 64-yard run (Tanner Rinker kick), 4:51. Lobos 19–7. Drive: 3 plays, 75 yards, 1:08.
- UNM – Cade Keith 40-yard pass from Jack Layne (Luke Drzewiecki kick), 2:44. Lobos 26–7. Drive: 4 plays, 70 yards, 2:08.

Third quarter

- No scoring plays.

Fourth quarter

- USU – Braden Pegan 13-yard pass from Bryson Barnes (Tanner Rinker kick), 12:49. Lobos 26–14. Drive: 7 plays, 87 yards, 2:19.
- UNM – Damon Bankston 41-yard run (Luke Drzewiecki kick), 8:28. Lobos 33–14. Drive: 7 plays, 75 yards, 4:21.

Statistics	USU	UNM
First downs	15	21
Plays–yards	48–306	64–407
Rushes–yards	25–142	42–224
Passing yards	164	183
Passing: Comp–Att–Int	13–23–1	17–22–0
Turnovers	1	0
Time of possession	21:44	38:16

Team	Category	Player	Statistics
Utah State	Passing	Bryson Barnes	13/23, 164 yards, TD, INT
Utah State	Rushing	Miles Davis	10 carries, 110 yards, TD
Utah State	Receiving	Braden Pegan	5 receptions, 108 yards, TD
New Mexico	Passing	Jack Layne	17/22, 183 yards, TD
New Mexico	Rushing	Damon Bankston	13 carries, 84 yards, TD
New Mexico	Receiving	Cade Keith	7 receptions, 104 yards, TD

=== Nevada ===
Nevada Wolf Pack (1–7) at Utah State Aggies (4–4) – Game summary

Quarter	1	2	3	4	Total
Wolf Pack	0	0	7	7	14
Aggies	24	17	7	3	51

at Maverik Stadium • Logan, UT

- Date: November 8, 2025
- Game time: 5:30 p.m. MST
- Game attendance: 19,418
- Referee: Nolan Dumas
- TV announcers (CBSSN): Chris Lewis (play-by-play) and Randy Cross (analyst)

Game information

First quarter

- USU – Brady Boyd 53-yard pass from Bryson Barnes (Tanner Rinker kick), 13:19. Aggies 7–0. Drive: 4 plays, 75 yards, 1:41.
- USU – Miles Davis 3-yard run (Tanner Rinker kick), 8:21. Aggies 14–0. Drive: 8 plays, 69 yards, 2:54.
- USU – Tanner Rinker 32-yard field goal, 2:39. Aggies 17–0. Drive: 8 plays, 65 yards, 3:38.
- USU – Brevin Hamblin 38-yard interception return (Tanner Rinker kick), 1:46. Aggies 24–0.

Second quarter

- USU – Tanner Rinker 44-yard field goal, 11:09. Aggies 27–0. Drive: 10 plays, 38 yards, 4:15.
- USU – Anthony Garcia 15-yard pass from Bryson Barnes (Tanner Rinker kick), 7:54. Aggies 34–0. Drive: 5 plays, 39 yards, 2:21.
- USU – Miles Davis 1-yard run (Tanner Rinker kick), 0:07. Aggies 41–0. Drive: 10 plays, 42 yards, 1:42.

Third quarter

- USU – Brady Boyd 21-yard pass from Bryson Barnes (Tanner Rinker kick), 7:45. Aggies 48–0. Drive: 7 plays, 76 yards, 3:39.
- NEV – Caleb Ramseur 41-yard pass from Chubba Purdy (Joe McFadden kick), 4:18. Aggies 48–7. Drive: 6 plays, 65 yards, 3:27.

Fourth quarter

- NEV – Jett Carpenter 34-yard pass from Chubba Purdy (Joe McFadden kick), 8:11. Aggies 48–14. Drive: 2 plays, 39 yards, 0:52.
- USU – Tanner Rinker 21-yard field goal, 5:13. Aggies 51–14. Drive: 6 plays, 67 yards, 2:58.

Statistics	NEV	USU
First downs	11	23
Plays–yards	57–242	75–522
Rushes–yards	33–120	40–145
Passing yards	122	377
Passing: Comp–Att–Int	10–24–2	24–35–0
Turnovers	3	0
Time of possession	27:38	32:22

Team	Category	Player	Statistics
Nevada	Passing	Chubba Purdy	3/7, 80 yards, 2 TD
Nevada	Rushing	Chubba Purdy	10 carries, 45 yards
Nevada	Receiving	Jett Carpenter	4 receptions, 58 yards, TD
Utah State	Passing	Bryson Barnes	20/27, 288 yards, 3 TD
Utah State	Rushing	Bryson Barnes	9 carries, 40 yards
Utah State	Receiving	Brady Boyd	5 receptions, 117 yards, 2 TD

=== at UNLV ===
Utah State Aggies (5–4) at UNLV Rebels (7–2) – Game summary

Quarter	1	2	3	4	OT	2OT	Total
Aggies	6	7	3	7	0	3	26
Rebels	3	7	7	6	0	6	29

at Allegiant Stadium • Paradise, NV

- Date: November 15, 2025
- Game time: 4:00 p.m. PST
- Game weather: none (indoors)
- Game attendance: 31,682
- Referee: Brad Carrell
- TV announcers (CBSSN): Jordan Kent (play-by-play) and Ben DiNucci (analyst)

Game information

First quarter

- UNLV – Ramon Villela 31-yard field goal, 4:36. Rebels 3–0. Drive: 13 plays, 64 yards, 5:13.
- USU – Brady Boyd 17-yard pass from Bryson Barnes (Tanner Rinker kick failed), 2:21. Aggies 6–3. Drive: 7 plays, 75 yards, 2:15.

Second quarter

- USU – Miles Davis 1-yard run (Tanner Rinker kick), 10:12. Aggies 13–3. Drive: 9 plays, 82 yards, 4:30.
- UNLV – Anthony Colandrea 10-yard run (Ramon Villela kick), 5:27. Aggies 13–10. Drive: 11 plays, 75 yards, 4:45.

Third quarter

- USU – Tanner Rinker 24-yard field goal, 8:40. Aggies 16–10. Drive: 13 plays, 75 yards, 4:59.
- UNLV – Daejon Reynolds 9-yard pass from Anthony Colandrea (Ramon Villela kick), 4:32. Rebels 17–16. Drive: 8 plays, 75 yards, 4:08.

Fourth quarter

- UNLV – Ramon Villela 31-yard field goal, 10:59. Rebels 20–16. Drive: 10 plays, 71 yards, 5:23.
- USU – Bryson Barnes 58-yard run (Tanner Rinker kick), 6:56. Aggies 23–20. Drive: 3 plays, 62 yards, 0:47.
- UNLV – Ramon Villela 32-yard field goal, 2:18. Tied 23–23. Drive: 11 plays, 67 yards, 3:40.

Overtime

- No scoring plays.

Second overtime

- USU – Tanner Rinker 39-yard field goal. Aggies 26–23. Drive: 4 plays, 4 yards.
- UNLV – Kayden McGee 25-yard run. Rebels 29–26. Drive: 1 play, 25 yards.

Statistics	USU	UNLV
First downs	23	27
Plays–yards	74–434	75–422
Rushes–yards	36–178	32–146
Passing yards	256	276
Passing: Comp–Att–Int	19–38–0	24–43–1
Turnovers	0	1
Time of possession	27:45	32:15

Team	Category	Player	Statistics
Utah State	Passing	Bryson Barnes	19/38, 256 yards, TD
Utah State	Rushing	Bryson Barnes	22 carries, 124 yards, TD
Utah State	Receiving	Braden Pegan	8 receptions, 109 yards
UNLV	Passing	Anthony Colandrea	24/43, 276 yards, TD, INT
UNLV	Rushing	Kayden McGee	3 carries, 54 yards, TD
UNLV	Receiving	Troy Omeire	4 receptions, 83 yards

=== at Fresno State ===
Utah State Aggies (5–5) vs Fresno State Bulldogs (7–3) – Game summary

Quarter	1	2	3	4	Total
Aggies	7	0	7	14	28
Bulldogs	7	10	0	0	17

at Valley Children's Stadium • Fresno, CA

- Date: November 22, 2025
- Game time: 7:30 p.m. PST
- Game weather: Clear
- Game attendance: 37,551
- Referee: Kenneth Ray
- TV announcers (CBSSN): Rich Waltz (play-by-play), Robert Turbin (analyst) and Brandon Baylor (sideline)

Game information

First quarter

- (7:05) FRES – Rayshon Luke 69-yard run, Dylan Lynch kick (Drive: 1 play, 69 yards, 0:12; Fresno State 7–0)
- (0:27) USU – Brady Boyd 24-yard pass from Anthony Garcia, Tanner Rinker kick (Drive: 3 plays, 40 yards, 0:20; Tied 7–7)

Second quarter

- (6:18) FRES – Dylan Lynch 30-yard field goal (Drive: 10 plays, 49 yards, 5:30; Fresno State 10–7)
- (0:39) FRES – Jahlil McClain 43-yard pass from E.J. Warner, Dylan Lynch kick (Drive: 7 plays, 73 yards, 1:11; Fresno State 17–7)

Third quarter

- (5:18) USU – Bryson Barnes 2-yard pass from Anthony Garcia, Tanner Rinker kick (Drive: 15 plays, 78 yards, 8:37; Fresno State 17–14)

Fourth quarter

- (10:37) USU – Javen Jacobs 19-yard run, Tanner Rinker kick (Drive: 13 plays, 80 yards, 4:38; Utah State 21–17)
- (6:05) USU – Javen Jacobs 32-yard run, Tanner Rinker kick (Drive: 6 plays, 75 yards, 3:04; Utah State 28–17)

Statistics	USU	FRES
First downs	27	12
Plays–yards	79–409	60–365
Rushes–yards	47–232	27–178
Passing yards	177	187
Passing: Comp–Att–Int	18–32–1	23–33–1
Turnovers	2	1
Time of possession	34:05	25:55

Team	Category	Player	Statistics
Utah State	Passing	Bryson Barnes	16/30. 150 yards, INT
Utah State	Rushing	Bryson Barnes	23 carries, 113 yards
Utah State	Receiving	Braden Pegan	8 receptions, 79 yards
Fresno State	Passing	E. J. Warner	23/33, 187 yards, TD, INT
Fresno State	Rushing	Rayshon Luke	4 carries, 81 yards, TD
Fresno State	Receiving	Jahlil McClain	2 receptions, 45 yards, TD

=== Boise State ===
Boise State Broncos (7-4) at Utah State Aggies (6-5) – Game summary

Quarter	1	2	3	4	Total
Broncos	10	3	6	6	25
Aggies	14	7	3	0	24

at Maverik Stadium • Logan, UT

- Date: November 28, 2025
- Game time: 2:00 p.m. MST
- Game weather: Cloudy • Temperature: 45 °F (7 °C)
- Game attendance: 21,155
- Referee: Christian Watson
- TV announcers (CBS): Chris Lewis (play-by-play), Logan Ryan (analyst) and Brandon Baylor (sideline)

Game information

First quarter

- (12:29) USU - Bryson Barnes 1-yard run, Tanner Rinker kick (Drive: 7 plays, 75 yards, 2:31; Utah State 7-0)
- (7:58) BOIS - Colton Boomer 27-yard field goal (Drive: 8 plays, 13 yards, 2:53; Utah State 7-3)
- (5:07) BOIS - Matt Wagner 11-yard pass from Max Cutforth, Colton Boomer kick (Drive: 4 plays, 46 yards, 1:57; Boise State 10-7)
- (4:05) USU - Javen Jacobs 56-yard run, Tanner Rinker kick (Drive: 3 plays, 75 yards, 1:02; Utah State 14-10)

Second quarter

- (1:55) USU - Miles Davis 11-yard run, Tanner Rinker kick (Drive: 9 plays, 74 yards, 2:21; Utah State 21-10)
- (0:12) BOIS - Colton Boomer 32-yard field goal (Drive: 14 plays, 60 yards, 1:43; Utah State 21-13)

Third quarter

- (4:09) USU - Tanner Rinker 37-yard field goal (Drive: 10 plays, 51 yards, 3:23; Utah State 24-13)
- (3:17) BOIS - Quinton Brown 66-yard pass from Max Cutforth, two-point pass conversion failed (Drive: 2 plays, 75 yards, 0:44; Utah State 24-19)

Fourth quarter

- (2:26) BOIS - Dylan Riley 6-yard run, two-point pass conversion failed (Drive: 7 plays, 41 yards, 2:56; Boise State 25-24')

Statistics	BOIS	USU
First downs	28	22
Plays–yards	95–512	66–405
Rushes–yards	46–171	34–221
Passing yards	341	184
Passing: Comp–Att–Int	26-49-0	13-32-0
Turnovers	1	1
Time of possession	36:58	23:02

Team	Category	Player	Statistics
Boise State	Passing	Max Cutforth	26/49, 341 yards, 2 TD
Boise State	Rushing	Dylan Riley	25 carries, 120 yards, TD
Boise State	Receiving	Matt Wagner	5 receptions, 69 yards, TD
Utah State	Passing	Bryson Barnes	13/31, 184 yards
Utah State	Rushing	Javen Jacobs	5 carries, 92 yards, TD
Utah State	Receiving	Anthony Garcia	2 receptions, 54 yards

=== vs. Washington State (Famous Idaho Potato Bowl) ===
2025 Famous Idaho Potato Bowl
Washington State Cougars (6-6) vs. Utah State Aggies (6-6) – Game summary

Quarter	1	2	3	4	Total
Cougars	7	7	6	14	34
Aggies	0	0	7	14	21

at Albertsons Stadium • Boise, ID

- Date: December 22
- Game time: 12:00 p.m. MST
- Game attendance: 17,031
- Referee: Garrett Dickerson
- TV announcers (ESPN): Chuckie Kempf (play-by-play), Darius Walker (analyst) and Tori Petry (sideline)

Game information

First quarter

- WSU - Mackenzie Alleyne 41-yard pass from Zevi Eckhaus (Jack Stevens kick), 7:08. Cougars 7-0, Drive: 4 plays, 56 yards, 1:37.

Second quarter

- WSU - Hudson Cederland 1-yard pass from Zevi Eckhaus (Jack Stevens kick), 4:43. Cougars 14-0, Drive: 8 plays, 47 yards, 3:58.

Third quarter

- WSU - Jack Stevens 23-yard field goal, 11:25. Cougars 17-0, Drive: 7 plays, 79 yards, 3:28.
- WSU - Jack Stevens 25-yard field goal, 7:31. Cougars 20-0, Drive: 7 plays, 75 yards, 2:11.
- USU - Bryson Barnes 2-yard run (Tanner Rinker kick), 2:27. Cougars 20-7, Drive: 5 plays, 60 yards, 1:20.

Fourth quarter

- WSU - Landon Wright 39-yard pass from Zevi Eckhaus (Jack Stevens kick), 14:11. Cougars 27-7, Drive: 7 plays, 79 yards, 3:09.
- USU - Brady Boyd 21-yard pass from Jacob Conover (Tanner Rinker kick), 10:09. Cougars 27-14, Drive: 7 plays, 75 yards, 4:02.
- WSU - Julian Dugger 34-yard run (Jack Stevens kick), 4:06. Cougars 34-14, Drive: 11 plays, 79 yards, 5:57.
- USU - Javen Jacobs 26-yard pass from Jacob Conover (Tanner Rinker kick), 1:48. Cougars 34-21, Drive: 7 plays, 65 yards, 2:18.

Statistics	WSU	USU
First downs	30	13
Plays–yards	91-628	54-254
Rushes–yards	41-255	26-60
Passing yards	373	194
Passing: comp–att–int	28-47-3	14-27-1
Turnovers	3	1
Time of possession	35:48	24:12

Team	Category	Player	Statistics
Washington State	Passing	Zevi Eckhaus	26/44, 334 yards, 3 INT
Washington State	Rushing	Maxwell Woods	9 carries, 117 yards
Washington State	Receiving	Joshua Meredith	8 receptions, 84 yards
Utah State	Passing	Bryson Barnes	9/21, 116 yards, INT
Utah State	Rushing	Javen Jacobs	3 carries, 24 yards
Utah State	Receiving	Brady Boyd	4 receptions, 99 yards, TD
