= 2025 McNeese Cowboys football team =

American college football season

2025 McNeese Cowboys football
- Conference: Southland Conference
- Record: 5–7 (4–4 SLC)
- Head coach: Matt Viator (11th season)
- Offensive coordinator: Tyler Bolfing (1st season)
- Co-offensive coordinator: Kyle Segler (1st season)
- Defensive coordinator: Tony Pecoraro (4th season)
- Home stadium: Navarre Stadium

2025 Southland Conference football standings
	Conf.			Overall
Team	W		L	W		L
No. 7 Stephen F. Austin $^	8	–	0	11	–	3
No. 19 Southeastern Louisiana ^	7	–	1	9	–	4
No. 24 Lamar ^	5	–	3	8	–	5
UT Rio Grande Valley	5	–	3	9	–	3
Nicholls	4	–	4	4	–	8
McNeese	4	–	4	5	–	7
East Texas A&M	3	–	5	3	–	9
Incarnate Word	3	–	5	5	–	7
Houston Christian	1	–	7	2	–	10
Northwestern State	0	–	8	1	–	11
$ – Conference champion; ^ – FCS playoff participant; Rankings from STATS Poll

The 2025 McNeese Cowboys football team represented McNeese State University in the 2025 NCAA Division I FCS football season. The Cowboys played their home games at Cowboy Stadium in Lake Charles, Louisiana, and competed in the Southland Conference. They were led by eleventh-year head coach Matt Viator, who was back as head coach after previously coaching the Cowboys from 2006 to 2015.

== Schedule ==
Date	Time	Opponent	Site	TV	Result	Attendance
August 30	6:00 pm	Louisiana Christian*	Navarre Stadium; Lake Charles, LA	ESPN+	W 54–9	11,279
September 6	7:00 pm	at Louisiana*	Cajun Field; Lafayette, LA (Cajun Crown)	ESPN+	L 10–34	26,071
September 13	6:00 pm	Weber State*	Navarre Stadium; Lake Charles, LA	ESPN+	L 41–42	11,702
September 20	7:00 pm	at Utah State*	Maverik Stadium; Logan, UT	KMYU	L 7–48	16,273
September 27	7:00 pm	at Stephen F. Austin	Homer Bryce Stadium; Nacogdoches, TX	ESPN+	L 17–34	10,684
October 4	6:00 pm	Southeastern Louisiana	Navarre Stadium; Lake Charles, LA	ESPN+	L 0–38	9,207
October 18	6:00 pm	Houston Christian^{†}	Navarre Stadium; Lake Charles, LA	ESPN+	W 27–0	10,339
October 25	3:00 pm	at Nicholls	Manning Field at John L. Guidry Stadium; Thibodaux, LA	ESPN+	L 7–31	3,476
November 1	6:00 pm	Northwestern State	Navarre Stadium; Lake Charles, LA (rivalry)	ESPN+	W 50–3	10,044
November 8	4:00 pm	at East Texas A&M	Ernest Hawkins Field at Memorial Stadium; Commerce, TX	ESPN+	W 35–20	2,534
November 15	6:00 pm	UT Rio Grande Valley	Navarre Stadium; Lake Charles, LA	ESPN+	L 13–28	9,929
November 22	3:00 pm	at No. 19 Lamar	Provost Umphrey Stadium; Beaumont, TX (Battle of the Border)	ESPN+	W 21–19	13,674
*Non-conference game; ^{†}Homecoming; Rankings from STATS Poll released prior to the game; All times are in Central time

== Game summaries ==
=== Louisiana Christian (NAIA) ===
Louisiana Christian Wildcats (NAIA) (0–0) at McNeese Cowboys (0–0) – Game summary

Quarter	1	2	3	4	Total
Wildcats (NAIA)	3	6	0	0	9
Cowboys	7	31	7	9	54

at Navarre Stadium, Lake Charles, Louisiana

- Date: August 30
- Game time: 6:00 PM CDT
- Game weather: Cloudy • Temperature: 81 °F (27 °C) • Wind: NE 7 mph
- Game attendance: 11,279
- Referee: Austin Mezzacasa
- TV announcers (ESPN+): Jeff Palermo (play-by-play), Chaston Tavares (analyst) and Rylie Eyster (sideline)

Game information

First quarter

- (12:03) LCU – Levi Hilborn 46-yard field goal (Drive: 6 plays, 17 yards, 1:49; Louisiana Christian 3–0)
- (5:00) MCN – Bryce Strong 7-yard pass from Jake Strong, Fabrizio Pinton kick (Drive: 12 plays, 75 yards, 7:03; McNeese 7–3)

Second quarter

- (14:00) MCN – Fabrizio Pinton 38-yard field goal (Drive: 12 plays, 75 yards, 7:03; McNeese 10–3)
- (9:07) MCN – Coleby Hamm 5-yard run, Fabrizio Pinton kick (Drive: 9 plays, 68 yards, 3:57; McNeese 17–3)
- (7:12) LCU – Bryce Perkins 4-yard run (Drive: 7 plays, 49 yards, 1:46; McNeese 17–9)
- (4:45) MCN – Tre'Vonte Citizen 21-yard run, Fabrizio Pinton kick (Drive: 5 plays, 57 yards, 2:20; McNeese 24–9)
- (3:09) MCN – Jonathan Harris 15-yard pass from Jake Strong, Fabrizio Pinton kick (Drive: 3 plays, 47 yards, 0:53; McNeese 31–9)
- (0:14) MCN – Jessie Campbell 11-yard pass from Jake Strong, Fabrizio Pinton kick (Drive: 6 plays, 96 yards, 1:19; McNeese 38–9)

Third quarter

- (2:58) MCN – Bryce Strong 5-yard run, Fabrizio Pinton kick (Drive: 9 plays, 84 yards, 4:59; McNeese 45–9)

Fourth quarter

- (7:54) MCN – Marquez Davis 12-yard run, Fabrizio Pinton kick (Drive: 10 plays, 86 yards, 4:35; McNeese 52–9)
- (7:02) MCN – 0-yard safety (McNeese 54–9)

Statistics	LCU	MCN
First downs	10	39
Total yards	141	664
Rushing yards	19	305
Passing yards	122	359
Turnovers	1	1
Time of possession	22:03	37:57

Team	Category	Player	Statistics
Louisiana Christian	Passing	Phillip Jones II	6/15, 65 yards
Louisiana Christian	Rushing	Jaterrius Johnson	6 carries, 45 yards
Louisiana Christian	Receiving	Edward Scott Jr.	4 receptions, 51 yards
McNeese	Passing	Jake Strong	22/28, 329 yards, 3 TD
McNeese	Rushing	Marquez Davis	12 carries, 97 yards, TD
McNeese	Receiving	Logan Mauldin	3 receptions, 86 yards

=== at Louisiana (FBS, Cajun Crown) ===
McNeese Cowboys (1–0) at Louisiana Ragin' Cajuns (FBS) (0–1) – Game summary

Quarter	1	2	3	4	Total
Cowboys	7	0	3	0	10
Ragin' Cajuns (FBS)	7	10	0	17	34

at Cajun Field, Lafayette, Louisiana

- Date: September 6
- Game time: 7:00 PM CDT
- Game weather: Sunny • Temperature: 89 °F (32 °C) • Wind: SW 5 mph
- Game attendance: 26,071
- Referee: Marshall Lewis
- TV announcers (ESPN+): Dan McDonald (play-by-play), Eric Mouton (analyst) and Ben Schafer (sideline)

Game information

First quarter

- (12:58) UL – Bill Davis 6-yard run, Tony Sterner kick (Drive: 5 plays, 46 yards, 1:54; Louisiana 7–0)
- (10:08) MCN – Devin Lippold 2-yard run, Fabrizio Pinton kick (Drive: 5 plays, 80 yards, 2:42; Tied 7–7)

Second quarter

- (1:06) UL – Bill Davis 36-yard run, Tony Sterner kick (Drive: 6 plays, 91 yards, 0:47; Louisiana 14–7)
- (0:00) UL – Tony Sterner 38-yard field goal (Drive: 4 plays, 35 yards, 0:39; Louisiana 17–7)

Third quarter

- (11:50) MCN – Fabrizio Pinton 45-yard field goal (Drive: 8 plays, 47 yards, 3:10; Louisiana 17–10)

Fourth quarter

- (10:41) UL – Tony Sterner 37-yard field goal (Drive: 12 plays, 65 yards, 6:19; Louisiana 20–10)
- (3:48) UL – Landon Baptiste 10-yard pass from Daniel Beale, Tony Sterner kick (Drive: 9 plays, 40 yards, 5:46; Louisiana 27–10)
- (1:39) UL – Steven Blanco 34-yard run, Tony Sterner kick (Drive: 1 play, 34 yards, 0:03; Louisiana 34–10)

Statistics	MCN	UL
First downs	14	25
Plays–yards	56–238	67–401
Rushes–yards	26–47	45–315
Passing yards	191	86
Passing: Comp–Att–Int	19–30–1	14–22–0
Turnovers	2	0
Time of possession	25:43	34:17

Team	Category	Player	Statistics
McNeese	Passing	Jake Strong	19/30, 191 yards, INT
McNeese	Rushing	Bryce Strong	7 carries, 17 yards
McNeese	Receiving	Joshua Jackson	4 receptions, 83 yards
Louisiana	Passing	Daniel Beale	14/22, 86 yards, TD
Louisiana	Rushing	Bill Davis	19 carries, 132 yards, 2 TD
Louisiana	Receiving	KeDarius Wade	1 reception, 19 yards

=== Weber State ===
Weber State Wildcats (0–2) at McNeese Cowboys (1–1) – Game summary

Quarter	1	2	3	4	Total
Wildcats	7	14	7	14	42
Cowboys	0	7	14	20	41

at Navarre Stadium, Lake Charles, Louisiana

- Date: September 13
- Game time: 6:00 PM CDT
- Game weather: Cloudy • Temperature: 92 °F (33 °C) • Wind: SE at 3 miles per hour (4.8 km/h)
- Game attendance: 11,702
- Referee: Gary Leeper
- TV announcers (ESPN+): Jeff Palermo (play-by-play), Chaston Tavares (analyst) and Rylee Eyster (sideline)

Game information

First quarter

- (5:06) WEB – Jayleen Record 78-yard pass from Jackson Gilkey, Sloan Calder kick (Drive: 2 plays, 79 yards, 0:42; Weber State 7–0)

Second quarter

- (14:46) WEB – Jackson Gilkey 50-yard run, Sloan Calder kick (Drive: 5 plays, 66 yards, 1:56; Weber State 14–0)
- (13:23) MCN – Bryce Strong 68-yard run, Fabrizio Pinton kick (Drive: 3 plays, 75 yards, 1:23; Weber State 14–7)
- (0:21) WEB – Sloan Calder 10-yard run, Sloan Calder kick (Drive: 13 plays, 70 yards, 4:38; Weber State 21–7)

Third quarter

- (12:02) MCN – Jonathan Harris 57-yard pass from Jake Strong, Fabrizio Pinton kick (Drive: 4 plays, 75 yards, 1:25; Weber State 21–14)
- (5:48) WEB – Davion Godley 2-yard run, Sloan Calder kick (Drive: 6 plays, 57 yards, 3:14; Weber State 28–14)
- (2:21) MCN – Jake Strong 5-yard run, Fabrizio Pinton kick (Drive: 9 plays, 46 yards, 3:19; Weber State 28–21)

Fourth quarter

- (11:05) WEB – Davion Godley 12-yard run, Sloan Calder kick (Drive: 13 plays, 78 yards, 6:11; Weber State 35–21)
- (9:45) WEB – BJ Carey 0-yard interception, Sloan Calder kick (Weber State 42–21)
- (9:04) MCN – Tre'Vonte Citizen 79-yard run, Fabrizio Pinton kick (Drive: 2 plays, 88 yards, 0:41; Weber State 42–28)
- (4:56) MCN – Jonathan Harris 3-yard pass from Jake Strong, Fabrizio Pinton kick (Drive: 9 plays, 32 yards, 2:45; Weber State 42–35)
- (0:42) MCN – Jake Strong 19-yard run, pass failed (Drive: 8 plays, 82 yards, 1:32; Weber State 42–41)

Statistics	WEB	MCN
First downs	21	21
Plays–yards	69–447	72–537
Rushes–yards	49–229	33–259
Passing yards	218	278
Passing: Comp–Att–Int	11–20–2	20–39–2
Turnovers	2	2
Time of possession	32:43	27:17

Team	Category	Player	Statistics
Weber State	Passing	Jackson Gilkey	11/20, 218 yards, TD, 2 INT
Weber State	Rushing	Jackson Gilkey	15 carries, 114 yards, TD
Weber State	Receiving	Jayleen Record	1 reception, 78 yards, TD
McNeese	Passing	Jake Strong	20/39, 278 yards, 2 TD, 2 INT
McNeese	Rushing	Tre'Vonte Citizen	11 carries, 117 yards, TD
McNeese	Receiving	Jonathan Harris	7 receptions, 114 yards, 2 TD

=== at Utah State (FBS) ===
McNeese Cowboys (1–2) at Utah State Aggies (FBS) (2–1) – Game summary

Quarter	1	2	3	4	Total
Cowboys	0	7	0	0	7
Aggies (FBS)	13	21	14	0	48

at Maverik Stadium, Logan, Utah

- Date: September 20
- Game time: 7:00 PM CDT
- Game weather: Sunny • Temperature: 76 °F (24 °C) • Wind: N 4 mph
- Game attendance: 16,273
- Referee: Brad Carrell
- TV announcers (KMYU): Dave Fox (play-by-play), Alema Harrington (analyst) and Frank Dolce (sideline)

Game information

First quarter

- (5:46) USU – Kahanu Davis 45-yard pass from Bryson Barnes (Drive: 6 plays, 61 yards, 2:03; Utah State 6–0)
- (3:54) USU – Brady Boyd 53-yard pass from Bryson Barnes, Tanner Rinker kick (Drive: 2 plays, 58 yards, 0:37; Utah State 13–0)

Second quarter

- (7:55) USU – Miles Davis 30-yard run, Tanner Rinker kick (Drive: 4 plays, 46 yards, 1:02; Utah State 20–0)
- (5:59) MCN – Jonathan Harris 20-yard pass from Jake Strong, Fabrizio Pinton kick (Drive: 4 plays, 75 yards, 1:56; Utah State 20–7)
- (1:33) USU – Bryson Barnes 3-yard run, Tanner Rinker kick (Drive: 10 plays, 75 yards, 4:26; Utah State 27–7)
- (0:22) USU – Javen Jacobs 1-yard run, Tanner Rinker kick (Drive: 5 plays, 52 yards, 0:43; Utah State 34–7)

Third quarter

- (9:37) USU – Bryson Barnes 21-yard run, Tanner Rinker kick (Drive: 8 plays, 69 yards, 4:03; Utah State 41–7)
- (3:34) USU – Brady Boyd 9-yard pass from Bryson Barnes, Tanner Rinker kick (Drive: 4 plays, 89 yards, 1:50; Utah State 48–7)

Fourth quarter

- No scoring plays.

Statistics	MCN	USU
First downs	13	27
Plays–yards	68–239	75–627
Rushes–yards	40–109	47–334
Passing yards	130	293
Passing: Comp–Att–Int	11–28–0	19–28–1
Turnovers	0	2
Time of possession	28:46	31:14

Team	Category	Player	Statistics
McNeese	Passing	Jake Strong	7/23, 89 yards, TD
McNeese	Rushing	Tre'Vonte Citizen	12 carries, 71 yards
McNeese	Receiving	Jonathan Harris	1 reception, 20 yards, TD
Utah State	Passing	Bryson Barnes	19/27, 293 yards, 3 TD, INT
Utah State	Rushing	Bryson Barnes	13 carries, 128 yards, 2 TD
Utah State	Receiving	Braden Pegan	3 receptions, 95 yards

=== at Stephen F. Austin ===
McNeese Cowboys (1–3) at Stephen F. Austin Lumberjacks (2–2) – Game summary

Quarter	1	2	3	4	Total
Cowboys	7	0	3	7	17
Lumberjacks	0	14	10	10	34

at Homer Bryce Stadium, Nacogdoches, Texas

- Date: September 27
- Game time: 7:00 PM CDT
- Game weather: Sunny
- Game attendance: 10,684
- Referee: Matt Beck
- TV announcers (ESPN+): Rob Myers (play-by-play) and Hunter Taylor (analyst)

Game information

First quarter

- (0:53) MCN – Tre'Vonte Citizen 20-yard run, Fabrizio Pinton kick (Drive: 10 plays, 57 yards, 4:26; McNeese 7–0)

Second quarter

- (9:21) SFA – Blaine Green 40-yard pass from Sam Vidlak, Carlos Alvarado kick (Drive: 6 plays, 60 yards, 2:20; Tied 7–7)
- (2:49) SFA – Kylon Harris 14-yard pass from Sam Vidlak, Carlos Alvarado kick (Drive: 6 plays, 27 yards, 1:40; Stephen F. Austin 14–7)

Third quarter

- (11:18) SFA – Kylon Harris 76-yard pass from Sam Vidlak, Carlos Alvarado kick (Drive: 4 plays, 95 yards, 1:48; Stephen F. Austin 21–7)
- (4:36) MCN – Fabrizio Pinton 37-yard field goal (Drive: 14 plays, 60 yards, 6:35; Stephen F. Austin 21–10)
- (0:49) SFA – Carlos Alvarado 40-yard field goal (Drive: 10 plays, 26 yards, 3:47; Stephen F. Austin 24–10)

Fourth quarter

- (6:43) SFA – Carlos Alvarado 24-yard field goal (Drive: 12 plays, 61 yards, 6:53; Stephen F. Austin 27–10)
- (2:27) MCN – Logan Mauldin 26-yard pass from Jake Strong, Fabrizio Pinton kick (Drive: 11 plays, 75 yards, 4:16; Stephen F. Austin 27–17)
- (1:51) SFA – Jerrell Wimbley 43-yard run, Carlos Alvarado kick (Drive: 2 plays, 63 yards, 0:36; Stephen F. Austin 34–17)

Statistics	MCN	SFA
First downs	18	19
Total yards	303	381
Rushing yards	89	148
Passing yards	214	233
Passing: Comp–Att–Int	21-36-1	15-29-0
Time of possession	32:12	27:48

Team	Category	Player	Statistics
McNeese	Passing	Jake Strong	21/34, 214 yards, TD, INT
McNeese	Rushing	Tre'Vonte Citizen	10 carries, 32 yards, TD
McNeese	Receiving	Logan Mauldin	6 receptions, 57 yards, TD
Stephen F. Austin	Passing	Sam Vidlak	15/29, 233 yards, 3 TDs
Stephen F. Austin	Rushing	Jerrel Wimbley	29 carries, 171 yards, TD
Stephen F. Austin	Receiving	Kylon Harris	4 receptions, 111 yards, 2 TDs

=== Southeastern Louisiana ===
Southeastern Louisiana Lions (3–2) at McNeese Cowboys (1–4) – Game summary

Quarter	1	2	3	4	Total
Lions	14	24	0	0	38
Cowboys	0	0	0	0	0

at Navarre Stadium, Lake Charles, Louisiana

- Date: October 4
- Game time: 6:00 PM CDT
- Game weather: Sunny • Temperature: 85 °F (29 °C) • Wind: NE 11 mph
- Game attendance: 9,207
- Referee: James Brookhart
- TV announcers (ESPN+): Jeff Palermo (play-by-play) and Chaston Tavares (analyst)

Game information

First quarter

- (10:39) SELA – Ian Conerly-Goodly 33-yard interception return, Guillermo Garcia Rodriguez kick (Drive: 3 plays, 5 yards, 0:45; Southeastern Louisiana 7–0)
- (3:38) SELA – Deantre Jackson 1-yard run, Guillermo Garcia Rodriguez kick (Drive: 8 plays, 63 yards, 3:45; Southeastern Louisiana 14–0)

Second quarter

- (14:54) SELA – Jaylon Domingeaux 2-yard pass from Kyle Lowe, Guillermo Garcia Rodriguez kick (Drive: 5 plays, 38 yards, 1:42; Southeastern Louisiana 21–0)
- (12:48) SELA – Deantre Jackson 45-yard run, Guillermo Garcia Rodriguez kick (Drive: 2 plays, 70 yards, 0:27; Southeastern Louisiana 28–0)
- (6:05) SELA – Guillermo Garcia Rodriguez 29-yard field goal (Drive: 10 plays, 30 yards, 5:14; Southeastern Louisiana 31–0)
- (1:53) SELA – Brandon Hayes 69-yard pass from Carson Camp, Guillermo Garcia Rodriguez kick (Drive: 5 plays, 79 yards, 2:22; Southeastern Louisiana 38–0)

Statistics	SELA	MCN
First downs	20	10
Total yards	418	189
Rushing yards	151	152
Passing yards	267	37
Passing: Comp–Att–Int	15–20–0	5–18–2
Time of possession	34:05	25:55

Team	Category	Player	Statistics
Southeastern Louisiana	Passing	Carson Camp	10/12, 173 yards, TD
Southeastern Louisiana	Rushing	Deantre Jackson	5 carries, 64 yards, 2 TDs
Southeastern Louisiana	Receiving	Brandon Hayes	2 receptions, 79 yards, TD
McNeese	Passing	Jake Strong	5/14, 37 yards, 2 INTs
McNeese	Rushing	Jaylen Thompson	5 carries, 63 yards
McNeese	Receiving	Trey Echols	1 reception, 12 yards

=== Houston Christian ===
Houston Christian Huskies (2–4) at McNeese Cowboys (1–5) – Game summary

Quarter	1	2	Total
Huskies			0
Cowboys			0

at Cowboy Stadium, Lake Charles, Louisiana

- Date: October 18
- Game time: 6:00 PM CDT
- Game attendance: 10,339

Statistics	HCU	MCN
First downs		
Total yards		
Rushing yards		
Passing yards		
Turnovers		
Time of possession		

Team	Category	Player	Statistics
Houston Christian	Passing		
Houston Christian	Rushing		
Houston Christian	Receiving		
McNeese	Passing		
McNeese	Rushing		
McNeese	Receiving		

=== at Nicholls ===
McNeese Cowboys (2–5) at Nicholls Colonels (1–6) – Game summary

Quarter	1	2	Total
Cowboys			0
Colonels			0

at Manning Field at John L. Guidry Stadium, Thibodaux, Louisiana

- Date: October 25
- TV: ESPN+

Statistics	MCN	NICH
First downs		
Total yards		
Rushing yards		
Passing yards		
Turnovers		
Time of possession		

Team	Category	Player	Statistics
McNeese	Passing		
McNeese	Rushing		
McNeese	Receiving		
Nicholls	Passing		
Nicholls	Rushing		
Nicholls	Receiving		

=== Northwestern State (rivalry) ===
Northwestern State Demons (1–7) at McNeese Cowboys (2–6) – Game summary

Quarter	1	2	Total
Demons			0
Cowboys			0

at Cowboy Stadium, Lake Charles, Louisiana

- Date: November 1
- Game time: 6:00 PM CDT
- TV: ESPN+

Statistics	NWST	MCN
First downs		
Total yards		
Rushing yards		
Passing yards		
Turnovers		
Time of possession		

Team	Category	Player	Statistics
Northwestern State	Passing		
Northwestern State	Rushing		
Northwestern State	Receiving		
McNeese	Passing		
McNeese	Rushing		
McNeese	Receiving		

=== at East Texas A&M ===
McNeese Cowboys (3–6) at East Texas A&M Lions (2–7) – Game summary

Quarter	1	2	Total
Cowboys			0
Lions			0

at Ernest Hawkins Field at Memorial Stadium, Commerce, Texas

- Date: November 8
- TV: ESPN+

Statistics	MCN	ETAM
First downs		
Total yards		
Rushing yards		
Passing yards		
Turnovers		
Time of possession		

Team	Category	Player	Statistics
McNeese	Passing		
McNeese	Rushing		
McNeese	Receiving		
East Texas A&M	Passing		
East Texas A&M	Rushing		
East Texas A&M	Receiving		

=== UT Rio Grande Valley ===
UT Rio Grande Valley Vaqueros at McNeese Cowboys – Game summary

Quarter	1	2	3	4	Total
Vaqueros	0	14	0	14	28
Cowboys	10	0	3	0	13

at Cowboy Stadium, Lake Charles, Louisiana

- Date: November 15
- Game time: 6:00 p.m. CDT
- Game weather: Sunny, 70 °F (21 °C)
- Game attendance: 9,929
- Referee: Craig Helser
- TV announcers (ESPN+): Jeff Palermo (play-by-play), Chaston Tavares (analyst) and Rylee Eyster (sideline)

Game information
First quarter
- MCN – Deaglan Camron 35-yard field goal, 3:16. Cowboys 3–0. Drive: 9 plays, 43 yards, 5:28.
- MCN – Matthew McCallister 85-yard pass from Jake Strong (Deaglan Camron kick), 0:07. Cowboys 10–0. Drive: 2 plays, 83 yards, 0:57.

Second quarter

- RGV – Tavian Cord 21-yard pass from Eddie Lee Marburger (Brysen Gardner kick), 4:47. Cowboys 10–7. Drive: 5 plays, 45 yards, 2:40.
- RGV – Tony Diaz 7-yard pass from Eddie Lee Marburger (Brysen Gardner kick), 0:26. Vaqueros 14–10. Drive: 12 plays, 91 yards, 2:03.

Third quarter

- MCN – Deaglan Camron 27-yard field goal, 3:55. Vaqueros 14–13. Drive: 16 plays, 65 yards, 8:51.

Fourth quarter

- RGV – Tony Diaz 75-yard pass from Eddie Lee Marburger (Brysen Gardner kick), 14:11. Vaqueros 21–13. Drive: 4 plays, 80 yards, 1:06.
- RGV – Tony Diaz 7-yard pass from Eddie Lee Marburger (Brysen Gardner kick), 4:12. Vaqueros 28–13. Drive: 9 plays, 88 yards, 4:49.

Statistics	RGV	MCN
First downs	18	22
Total yards	365	414
Rushing yards	108	123
Passing yards	257	291
Turnovers	0	2
Time of possession	23:36	36:24

Team	Category	Player	Statistics
UT Rio Grande Valley	Passing	Eddie Lee Marburger	17/29, 257 yards, 4 TD
UT Rio Grande Valley	Rushing	Nathan Denney	14 carries, 57 yards
UT Rio Grande Valley	Receiving	Tony Diaz	7 receptions, 134 yards, 3 TD
McNeese	Passing	Jake Strong	25/35, 275 yards, TD, 2 INT
McNeese	Rushing	Coleby Hamm	13 carries, 49 yards
McNeese	Receiving	Matthew McCallister	6 receptions, 140 yards, TD

=== at No. 19 Lamar (Battle of the Border) ===
McNeese Cowboys (4–7) at No. 19 Lamar Cardinals (8–3) – Game summary

Quarter	1	2	Total
Cowboys			0
No. 19 Cardinals			0

at Provost Umphrey Stadium, Beaumont, Texas

- Date: November 22
- Game time: 3:00 PM CST
- TV: ESPN+

Statistics	MCN	LAM
First downs		
Total yards		
Rushing yards		
Passing yards		
Turnovers		
Time of possession		

Team	Category	Player	Statistics
McNeese	Passing		
McNeese	Rushing		
McNeese	Receiving		
Lamar	Passing		
Lamar	Rushing		
Lamar	Receiving		
