= 2025 Southeastern Louisiana Lions football team =

American college football season

2025 Southeastern Louisiana Lions football

NCAA Division I First Round, L 3–21 vs. Illinois State
- Conference: Southland Conference

Ranking
- STATS: No. 19
- FCS Coaches: No. 19
- Record: 9–4 (7–1 SLC)
- Head coach: Frank Scelfo (8th season)
- Offensive coordinator: Anthony Scelfo (2nd season)
- Offensive scheme: Multiple
- Defensive coordinator: Bill D'Ottavio (4th season)
- Base defense: Multiple 3–4
- Home stadium: Strawberry Stadium

2025 Southland Conference football standings
	Conf.			Overall
Team	W		L	W		L
No. 7 Stephen F. Austin $^	8	–	0	11	–	3
No. 19 Southeastern Louisiana ^	7	–	1	9	–	4
No. 24 Lamar ^	5	–	3	8	–	5
UT Rio Grande Valley	5	–	3	9	–	3
Nicholls	4	–	4	4	–	8
McNeese	4	–	4	5	–	7
East Texas A&M	3	–	5	3	–	9
Incarnate Word	3	–	5	5	–	7
Houston Christian	1	–	7	2	–	10
Northwestern State	0	–	8	1	–	11
$ – Conference champion; ^ – FCS playoff participant; Rankings from STATS Poll

The 2025 Southeastern Louisiana Lions football team represented Southeastern Louisiana University as a member of the Southland Conference during the 2025 NCAA Division I FCS football season. They were led by head coach Frank Scelfo, who was coaching in his eighth season with the program. The Lions played their home games at Strawberry Stadium in Hammond, Louisiana.

== Schedule ==
Date	Time	Opponent	Rank	Site	TV	Result	Attendance
August 30	6:30 p.m.	at Louisiana Tech*		Joe Aillet Stadium; Ruston, LA	ESPN+	L 0–24	12,872
September 6	6:00 p.m.	at Murray State*		Roy Stewart Stadium; Murray, KY	ESPN+	W 45–24	15,027
September 13	6:00 p.m.	Mississippi Valley State*		Strawberry Stadium; Hammond, LA	ESPN+	W 56–3	4,286
September 20	6:45 p.m.	at No. 3 (FBS) LSU*		Tiger Stadium; Baton Rouge, LA	SECN	L 10–56	102,219
September 27	6:00 p.m.	UT Rio Grande Valley		Strawberry Stadium; Hammond, LA	ESPN+	W 45–31	4,154
October 4	6:00 p.m.	at McNeese		Cowboy Stadium; Lake Charles, LA	ESPN+	W 38–0	9,207
October 18	4:00 p.m.	Northwestern State^{†}		Strawberry Stadium; Hammond, LA (rivalry)	ESPN+	W 49–0	6,112
October 25	2:00 p.m.	at Houston Christian		Husky Stadium; Houston, TX	ESPN+	W 38−14	1,082
November 1	6:00 p.m.	East Texas A&M	No. 21	Strawberry Stadium; Hammond, LA	ESPN+	W 59−14	4,121
November 8	3:00 p.m.	at No. 20 Lamar	No. 19	Provost Umphrey Stadium; Beaumont, TX	ESPN+	L 12−14	6,183
November 15	2:00 p.m.	at Incarnate Word	No. 23	Gayle and Tom Benson Stadium; San Antonio, TX	ESPN+	W 10−7	2,165
November 20	6:00 p.m.	Nicholls	No. 21	Strawberry Stadium; Hammond, LA (River Bell Classic)	ESPN+	W 38–26	6,346
November 29	12:00 p.m.	No. 17т Illinois State*	No. 17т	Strawberry Stadium; Hammond, LA (NCAA Division I First Round)	ESPN+	L 3–21	3,321
*Non-conference game; ^{†}Homecoming; Rankings from STATS Poll released prior to the game; All times are in Central time

== Game summaries ==
=== at Louisiana Tech (FBS) ===
Southeastern Louisiana Lions (0–0) at Louisiana Tech Bulldogs (FBS) (0–0) – Game summary

Quarter	1	2	3	4	Total
Lions	0	0	0	0	0
Bulldogs (FBS)	0	3	21	0	24

at Joe Aillet Stadium, Ruston, Louisiana

- Date: August 30
- Game time: 6:30 PM CDT
- Game weather: Sunny, 86 °F (30 °C)
- Game attendance: 12,872
- Referee: Garrett Dickerson
- TV announcers (ESPN+): Malcolm Butler (play-by-play), Luke McCown (analyst) and Madison Kaufman (sideline)

Game information

First quarter

- No scoring plays.

Second quarter

- LT – Drew Henderson 18-yard field goal, 0:00. Bulldogs 3–0. Drive: 6 plays, 78 yards, 0:47.

Third quarter

- LT – Omiri Wiggins 17-yard pass from Trey Kukuk (Drew Henderson kick), 12:24. Bulldogs 10–0. Drive: 7 plays, 58 yards, 2:33.
- LT – Clay Thevenin 2-yard run (Drew Henderson kick), 8:32. Bulldogs 17–0. Drive: 7 plays, 50 yards, 2:20.
- LT – Kam Franklin 80-yard fumble return (Drew Henderson kick), 5:12. Bulldogs 24–0.

Fourth quarter

- No scoring plays.

Statistics	SELA	LT
First downs	18	14
Plays–yards	75–271	53–262
Rushes–yards	44–126	34–136
Passing yards	145	126
Passing: comp–att–int	15–31–2	13–19–0
Turnovers	3	0
Time of possession	27:53	32:07

Team	Category	Player	Statistics
Southeastern Louisiana	Passing	Carson Camp	11/22, 122 yards, INT
Southeastern Louisiana	Rushing	Jaedon Henry	8 carries, 31 yards
Southeastern Louisiana	Receiving	Luke Besh	3 receptions, 59 yards
Louisiana Tech	Passing	Trey Kukuk	13/18, 126 yards, TD
Louisiana Tech	Rushing	Clay Thevenin	6 carries, 61 yards, TD
Louisiana Tech	Receiving	Eli Finley	4 receptions, 59 yards

=== at Murray State ===
Southeastern Louisiana Lions (0–1) at Murray State Racers (0–1) – Game summary

Quarter	1	2	Total
Lions			0
Racers			0

at Roy Stewart Stadium, Murray, Kentucky

- Date: September 6
- Game time: 6:00 p.m. CDT
- TV announcers (ESPN+): Rob Cross (play-by-play) and Drayton Charlton-Perrin (analyst)

Statistics	SELA	MUR
First downs		
Total yards		
Rushing yards		
Passing yards		
Turnovers		
Time of possession		

Team	Category	Player	Statistics
Southeastern Louisiana	Passing		
Southeastern Louisiana	Rushing		
Southeastern Louisiana	Receiving		
Murray State	Passing		
Murray State	Rushing		
Murray State	Receiving		

=== Mississippi Valley State ===
Mississippi Valley State Delta Devils (0–2) at Southeastern Louisiana Lions (1–1) – Game summary

Quarter	1	2	Total
Delta Devils			0
Lions			0

at Strawberry Stadium, Hammond, Louisiana

- Date: September 13
- Game time: 6:00 PM CDT
- TV: ESPN+

Statistics	MVSU	SELA
First downs		
Total yards		
Rushing yards		
Passing yards		
Turnovers		
Time of possession		

Team	Category	Player	Statistics
Mississippi Valley State	Passing		
Mississippi Valley State	Rushing		
Mississippi Valley State	Receiving		
Southeastern Louisiana	Passing		
Southeastern Louisiana	Rushing		
Southeastern Louisiana	Receiving		

=== at No. 3 (FBS) LSU ===
Southeastern Louisiana Lions (2–1) at No. 3 (FBS) LSU Tigers (3–0) – Game summary

Quarter	1	2	3	4	Total
Lions	0	0	7	3	10
No. 3 (FBS) Tigers	7	28	7	14	56

at Tiger Stadium, Baton Rouge, Louisiana

- Date: September 20
- Game time: 6:45 PM CDT
- Game weather: Sunny • Temperature: 87 °F (31 °C) • Wind: S 7 mph
- Game attendance: 102,219
- Referee: Kyle Olson
- TV announcers (SECN): Tom Hart (play-by-play), Jordan Rodgers (analyst), and Cole Cubelic (sideline)

Game information

First quarter

- (5:08) LSU – Garrett Nussmeier 1-yard run, Damian Ramos kick (Drive: 13 plays, 45 yards, 5:18; LSU 7–0)

Second quarter

- (13:12) LSU – Ju'Juan Johnson 2-yard run, Damian Ramos kick (Drive: 7 plays, 44 yards, 2:58; LSU 14–0)
- (8:19) LSU – Ju'Juan Johnson 10-yard run, Damian Ramos kick (Drive: 7 plays, 74 yards, 3:14; LSU 21–0)
- (2:06) LSU – Barion Brown 17-yard pass from Garrett Nussmeier, Damian Ramos kick (Drive: 8 plays, 57 yards, 3:50; LSU 28–0)
- (0:15) LSU – Zavion Thomas 9-yard pass from Garrett Nussmeier, Damian Ramos kick (Drive: 8 plays, 56 yards, 1:25; LSU 35–0)

Third quarter

- (9:28) LSU – Bauer Sharp 23-yard pass from Garrett Nussmeier, Damian Ramos kick (Drive: 7 plays, 87 yards, 3:17; LSU 42–0)
- (6:07) SLU – Deantre Jackson 14-yard pass from Carson Camp, Guillermo Garcia Rodriguez kick (Drive: 8 plays, 75 yards, 3:21; LSU 42–7)

Fourth quarter

- (13:54) LSU – Michael Van Buren Jr. 1-yard run, Damian Ramos kick (Drive: 16 plays, 81 yards, 7:05; LSU 49–7)
- (8:11) LSU – Kyle Parker 27-yard pass from Michael Van Buren Jr., Damian Ramos kick (Drive: 6 plays, 58 yards, 3:30; LSU 56–7)
- (2:16) SLU – Guillermo Garcia Rodriguez 37-yard field goal (Drive: 11 plays, 55 yards, 5:55; LSU 56–10)

Statistics	SELA	LSU
First downs	10	32
Total yards	204	530
Rushing yards	88	135
Passing yards	116	395
Turnovers	0	0
Time of possession	25:16	34:44

Team	Category	Player	Statistics
Southeastern Louisiana	Passing	Carson Camp	8/13, 87 yards, TD
Southeastern Louisiana	Rushing	Calvin Smith Jr.	2 carries, 40 yards
Southeastern Louisiana	Receiving	Deantre Jackson	3 receptions, 36 yards, TD
LSU	Passing	Garrett Nussmeier	25/31, 273 yards, 3 TD
LSU	Rushing	Ju'Juan Johnson	8 carries, 43 yards, 2 TD
LSU	Receiving	Bauer Sharp	5 receptions, 73 yards, TD

=== UT Rio Grande Valley ===
UT Rio Grande Valley Vaqueros (4–0) at Southeastern Louisiana Lions (2–2) – Game summary

Quarter	1	2	3	4	Total
Vaqueros	0	10	7	14	31
Lions	7	21	14	3	45

at Strawberry Stadium, Hammond, Louisiana

- Date: September 27
- Game time: 6:00 PM CDT
- Game weather: Sunny, 85 °F (29 °C)
- Game attendance: 4,154
- Referee: Austin Mezzacasa
- TV announcers (ESPN+): Logan Loving (play-by-play) and Jules Dormain (analyst)

Game information
First quarter
- SELA – Kyle Lowe 38-yard run (Guillermo Garcia Rodriguez kick), 10:20. Lions 7–0. Drive: 10 plays, 99 yards, 4:30.

Second quarter

- SELA – Adyn Wilkinson 29-yard pass from Kyle Lowe (Guillermo Garcia Rodriguez kick), 11:37. Lions 14–0. Drive: 14 plays, 91 yards, 7:48.
- SELA – Jaedon Henry 1-yard run (Guillermo Garcia Rodriguez kick), 7:13. Lions 21–0. Drive: 8 plays, 43 yards, 2:35.
- RGV – Kyran Lee 3-yard pass from Eddie Lee Marburger (Brysen Gardner kick), 5:47. Lions 21–7. Drive: 5 plays, 75 yards, 1:26.
- SELA – Jaylon Domingeaux 26-yard pass from Carson Camp (Guillermo Garcia Rodriguez kick), 0:36. Lions 28–7. Drive: 2 plays, 45 yards, 0:21.
- RGV – Brysen Gardner 26-yard field goal, 0:00. Lions 28–10. Drive: 9 plays, 66 yards, 0:36.

Third quarter

- RGV – Tony Diaz 71-yard pass from Eddie Lee Marburger (Brysen Gardner kick), 11:46. Lions 28–17. Drive: 1 play, 71 yards, 0:10.
- SELA – Deantre Jackson 66-yard run (Guillermo Garcia Rodriguez kick), 10:45. Lions 35–17. Drive: 5 plays, 98 yards, 1:01.
- SELA – Kentrell Prejean 29-yard pass from Carson Camp (Guillermo Garcia Rodriguez kick), 3:10. Lions 42–17. Drive: 9 plays, 80 yards, 4:33.

Fourth quarter

- RGV – Ismael Smith Flores 18-yard pass from Eddie Lee Marburger (Brysen Gardner kick), 13:14. Lions 42–24. Drive: 1 play, 18 yards, 0:07.
- SELA – Guillermo Garcia Rodriguez 29-yard field goal, 8:39. Lions 45–24. Drive: 8 plays, 85 yards, 4:29.
- RGV – Aidan Jakobsohn 6-yard run (Brysen Gardner kick), 1:00. Lions 45–31. Drive: 8 plays, 53 yards, 3:36.

Statistics	RGV	SELA
First downs	19	24
Total yards	457	540
Rushing yards	217	288
Passing yards	240	252
Turnovers	1	1
Time of possession	26:43	33:17

Team	Category	Player	Statistics
UT Rio Grande Valley	Passing	Eddie Lee Marburger	16/29, 218 yards, 3 TD, INT
UT Rio Grande Valley	Rushing	Nathan Denney	7 carries, 56 yards
UT Rio Grande Valley	Receiving	Tony Diaz	4 receptions, 113 yards, TD
Southeastern Louisiana	Passing	Carson Camp	10/13, 130 yards, 2 TD
Southeastern Louisiana	Rushing	Deantre Jackson	13 carries, 121 yards, TD
Southeastern Louisiana	Receiving	Jaylon Domingeaux	7 receptions, 107 yards, TD

=== at McNeese ===
Southeastern Louisiana Lions (3–2) at McNeese Cowboys (1–4) – Game summary

Quarter	1	2	3	4	Total
Lions	14	24	0	0	38
Cowboys	0	0	0	0	0

at Cowboy Stadium, Lake Charles, Louisiana

- Date: October 4
- Game time: 6:00 PM CDT
- TV announcers (ESPN+): Jeff Palermo (play-by-play) and Chaston Tavares (analyst)

Statistics	SELA	MCN
First downs		
Total yards		
Rushing yards		
Passing yards		
Turnovers		
Time of possession		

Team	Category	Player	Statistics
Southeastern Louisiana	Passing		
Southeastern Louisiana	Rushing		
Southeastern Louisiana	Receiving		
McNeese	Passing		
McNeese	Rushing		
McNeese	Receiving		

=== Northwestern State (rivalry) ===
Northwestern State Demons (1–5) at Southeastern Louisiana Lions (4–2) – Game summary

Quarter	1	2	Total
Demons			0
Lions			0

at Strawberry Stadium, Hammond, Louisiana

- Date: October 18
- Game time: 4:00 PM CDT

Statistics	NWST	SELA
First downs		
Plays–yards		
Rushes–yards		
Passing yards		
Turnovers		
Time of possession		

Team	Category	Player	Statistics
Northwestern State	Passing		
Northwestern State	Rushing		
Northwestern State	Receiving		
Southeastern Louisiana	Passing		
Southeastern Louisiana	Rushing		
Southeastern Louisiana	Receiving		

=== at Houston Christian ===
Southeastern Louisiana Lions (5–2) at Houston Christian Huskies (2–5) – Game summary

Quarter	1	2	Total
Lions			0
Huskies			0

at Husky Stadium, Houston, Texas

- Date: October 25
- Game time: 2:00 PM CDT
- TV: ESPN+

Statistics	SELA	HCU
First downs		
Plays–yards		
Rushes–yards		
Passing yards		
Turnovers		
Time of possession		

Team	Category	Player	Statistics
Southeastern Louisiana	Passing		
Southeastern Louisiana	Rushing		
Southeastern Louisiana	Receiving		
Houston Christian	Passing		
Houston Christian	Rushing		
Houston Christian	Receiving		

=== East Texas A&M ===
East Texas A&M Lions (2–6) at No. 21 Southeastern Louisiana Lions (6–2) – Game summary

Quarter	1	2	Total
East Texas A&M			0
No. 21 Southeastern Louisiana			0

at Strawberry Stadium, Hammond, Louisiana

- Date: November 1
- Game time: 6:00 PM CDT
- TV: ESPN+

Statistics	ETAM	SELA
First downs		
Total yards		
Rushing yards		
Passing yards		
Turnovers		
Time of possession		

Team	Category	Player	Statistics
East Texas A&M	Passing		
East Texas A&M	Rushing		
East Texas A&M	Receiving		
Southeastern Louisiana	Passing		
Southeastern Louisiana	Rushing		
Southeastern Louisiana	Receiving		

=== at No. 20 Lamar ===
No. 19 Southeastern Louisiana Lions (7–2) at No. 20 Lamar Cardinals (7–2) – Game summary

Quarter	1	2	Total
No. 19 Lions			0
No. 20 Cardinals			0

at Provost Umphrey Stadium, Beaumont, Texas

- Date: November 8
- Game time: 3:00 PM CST
- TV: ESPN+

Statistics	SELA	LAM
First downs		
Total yards		
Rushing yards		
Passing yards		
Turnovers		
Time of possession		

Team	Category	Player	Statistics
Southeastern Louisiana	Passing		
Southeastern Louisiana	Rushing		
Southeastern Louisiana	Receiving		
Lamar	Passing		
Lamar	Rushing		
Lamar	Receiving		

=== at Incarnate Word ===
No. 23 Southeastern Louisiana Lions (7–3) at Incarnate Word Cardinals (4–6) – Game summary

Quarter	1	2	Total
No. 23 Lions			0
Cardinals			0

at Gayle and Tom Benson Stadium, San Antonio, Texas

- Date: November 15
- Game time: 2:00 PM CST
- TV: ESPN+

Statistics	SELA	UIW
First downs		
Total yards		
Rushing yards		
Passing yards		
Turnovers		
Time of possession		

Team	Category	Player	Statistics
Southeastern Louisiana	Passing		
Southeastern Louisiana	Rushing		
Southeastern Louisiana	Receiving		
Incarnate Word	Passing		
Incarnate Word	Rushing		
Incarnate Word	Receiving		

=== Nicholls (River Bell Classic) ===
Nicholls Colonels (4–7) at No. 21 Southeastern Louisiana Lions (8–3) – Game summary

Quarter	1	2	Total
Colonels			0
No. 21 Lions			0

at Strawberry Stadium, Hammond, Louisiana

- Date: November 20
- Game time: 6:00 PM CST
- TV: ESPN+

Statistics	NICH	SELA
First downs		
Total yards		
Rushing yards		
Passing yards		
Turnovers		
Time of possession		

Team	Category	Player	Statistics
Nicholls	Passing		
Nicholls	Rushing		
Nicholls	Receiving		
Southeastern Louisiana	Passing		
Southeastern Louisiana	Rushing		
Southeastern Louisiana	Receiving		

=== NCAA Division I playoffs ===
==== No. 17т Illinois State (first round) ====
No. 17т Illinois State Redbirds (8–4) at No. 17т (16) Southeastern Louisiana Lions (9–3) – Game summary

Quarter	1	2	3	4	Total
No. 17т Redbirds	7	0	7	7	21
No. 17т (16) Lions	0	3	0	0	3

at Strawberry Stadium • Hammond, LA

- Date: November 29
- Game time: 12:00 PM
- Game weather: Cloudy • Temperature: 67 °F (19 °C) • Wind: SE at 13 miles per hour (21 km/h)
- Game attendance: 3,321
- Referee: Jeff Pumphrey
- TV announcers (ESPN+): Jack Benjamin (play-by-play), Forrest Conoly (analyst)
- Box Score

Game information
First quarter
- ISU – Tommy Rittenhouse 6–yard run (Matt Maldonado kick), 12:46. Redbirds 7–0. Drive: 6 plays, 80 yards, 2:07.

Second quarter

- SLU – Guillermo Garcia Rodriguez 40–yard field goal, 14:55. Redbirds 7–3. Drive: 16 plays, 69 yards, 7:22.

Third quarter

- ISU – Daniel Sobkowicz 1–yard pass from Rittenhouse (Maldonado kick), 8:48. Redbirds 14–3. Drive: 10 plays, 37 yards, 4:33.

Fourth quarter

- ISU – Seth Glatz 1–yard run (Maldonado kick), 2:30. Redbirds 21–3. Drive: 9 plays, 46 yards, 2:28.

Statistics	ISU	SLU
First downs	17	18
Total yards	292	321
Rushing yards	145	107
Passing yards	147	214
Passing: Comp–Att–Int	15–23–0	24–39–4
Time of possession	28:21	31:39

Team	Category	Player	Statistics
Illinois State	Passing	Tommy Rittenhouse	14/22, 146 yards
Illinois State	Rushing	Victor Dawson	11 carries, 72 yards
Illinois State	Receiving	Daniel Sobkowicz	8 receptions, 89 yards
Southeastern Louisiana	Passing	Carson Camp	14/21, 120 yards, 3 INT
Southeastern Louisiana	Rushing	Jaedon Henry	8 carries, 45 yards
Southeastern Louisiana	Receiving	Jaylon Domingeaux	6 receptions, 78 yards

== Personnel ==
=== Coaching staff ===
Name	Position
Frank Scelfo	Head coach
Anthony Scelfo	Offensive coordinator / quarterbacks coach
Bill D'Ottavio	Defensive coordinator
Ross Jenkins	Assistant head coach / tight ends coach / special teams coordinator
Alvin Slaughter	Wide receivers coach
Trey Willie	Running backs coach
Dustin Landry	Secondary coach
Antonio Baker	Nickelbacks coach
Tom Rinaldi	Defensive line coach
Trey Nunez	Linebackers coach
Sam Gregg	Offensive line coach
David Mertens	Director of player personnel

=== Roster ===
2025 Southeastern Louisiana Lions Football
Quarterbacks: 6 – Kyle Lowe – (redshirt) sophomore (5'10, 195); 10 – Tanner Murray – junior (6'3, 195); 14 – Casey Avrard – (redshirt) sophomore (6'2, 215); 18 – Carson Camp – junior (6'3, 215); 19 – Conner Nelson – freshman (6'2, 215); Running backs: 3 – Deantre Jackson – junior (5'8, 175); 12 – Rodeo Graham Jr. – senior (6'0, 205); 16 – Kyree Paul – freshman (5'9, 165); 21 – Jaedon Henry – graduate (6'0, 200); 29 – Calvin Smith Jr. – freshman (5'11, 210); 32 – Cayden Jones – freshman (5'10, 180); 39 – Eugene Foulcard – (redshirt) freshman (5'8, 165); Wide receivers: 1 – Jaylon Domingeaux – junior (6'2, 210); 4 – Brandon Hayes – senior (6'2, 205); 13 – Jordyn Williams – senior (6'1, 180); 14 – Dakota Williams – junior (6'2, 200); 15 – Khai Prean – sophomore (6'0, 200); 16 – Mike Williams – (redshirt) sophomore (5'11, 170); 17 – Kentrell Prejean – sophomore (5'8, 180); 19 – Corey Lorio – (redshirt) senior (5'10, 170); 80 – Da'shun Hugley – (redshirt) senior (6'1, 185); 80 – AD Washington – freshman (5'10, 160); 81 – Dkhai Joseph – sophomore (5'10, 160); 82 – Luke Besh – senior (6'1, 195); 82 – Tristan Goodly – (redshirt) sophomore (6'0, 170); 83 – Jayden Ivory – junior (6'0, 165); 84 – Jett Booker – (redshirt) senior (5'11, 195); 86 – Jayson Salkey – junior (6'2, 195); 87 – Aamir Ellis – freshman (6'0, 170)	Tight ends: 34 – Brant Monistere – junior (5'11, 225); 42 – Beau Perez – (redshirt) freshman (6'5, 235); 44 – Dalton Rufini – (redshirt) freshman (6'4, 210); 85 – Adyn Wilkinson – sophomore (6'4, 250); 88 – Lonnie Shinn – freshman (6'5, 235); 89 – Cade Collier – (redshirt) senior (6'6, 245); Fullbacks: 30 – Zane Hooper – junior (6'0, 270); 38 – Devaki Williams – (redshirt) sophomore (6'1, 230); Offensive linemen: 51 – Breland Curry – (redshirt) sophomore (6'2, 305); 52 – Noah Devlin – (redshirt) senior (6'3, 300); 54 – Amiree Alexander – (redshirt) freshman (6'2, 335); 56 – Javin Turner – (redshirt) senior (6'2, 280); 60 – Ilias Rida – (redshirt) sophomore (6'7, 270); 61 – Holden Kareokowsky – (redshirt) senior (6'3, 305); 63 – Corin Boudreaux – (redshirt) sophomore (6'1, 300); 65 – Riley Whitten – (redshirt) sophomore (6'2, 300); 66 – Carson Dillashaw – (redshirt) sophomore (6'6, 285); 72 – Deshawn Feazell – freshman (6'2, 330); 73 – Isaiah Hayes – (redshirt) freshman (6'4, 310); 76 – Damien Reed – (redshirt) freshman (6'2, 305); 78 – Logan Potter – (redshirt) sophomore (6'5, 330)	Defensive linemen: 2 – Kaleb Proctor – senior (6'3, 280); 9 – Rowan Briggs – senior (6'3, 255); 38 – Otto Brewer III – (redshirt) freshman (6'3, 245); 39 – James Harris – (redshirt) freshman (6'2, 240); 41 – Evan Aubrey – (redshirt) freshman (6'4, 240); 44 – Joshua Randall – (redshirt) senior (6'2, 205); 45 – Khalid Moore – junior (6'2, 250); 48 – Max Elkman – junior (6'6, 255); 55 – Camden Womack – (redshirt) freshman (6'5, 200); 58 – Nate Allen – freshman (6'2, 255); 90 – Peyton Anderson – junior (6'3, 285); 91 – Gabe Whittington – junior (6'0, 275); 92 – Etison Pholo – freshman (6'2, 275); 93 – Gabriel Harvey – freshman (6'3, 230); 95 – Ahmad Bradley – senior (6'3, 350); 96 – Dalton Allen – (redshirt) junior (6'4, 245); 97 – Louis Gendron – (redshirt) freshman (6'3, 290); 99 – Charles Hill – graduate (6'4, 245); Linebackers: 0 – KK Reno – senior (6'0, 220); 22 – Carter Hanberry – sophomore (6'0, 215); 31 – Tanner Spears – freshman (6'0, 200); 32 – Kyle Cannon – sophomore (6'1, 240); 33 – Justin Dumas – (redshirt) senior (6'1, 205); 40 – Jordan Okoye – junior (6'1, 215); 41 – Jackson Casanova – freshman (6'1, 220); 43 – Jirrea Johnson Jr. – (redshirt) sophomore (5'11, 220); 50 – Stiles Guidry – sophomore (6'1, 240)	Defensive backs: 5 – Khamron Ford – graduate (6'0, 205); 7 – Blayne Delahoussaye – (redshirt) senior (5'10, 175); 8 – Kamron Norwood – junior (5'11, 180); 11 – Shakespeare Louis – (redshirt) junior (6'1, 190); 12 – Tre Brown – (redshirt) freshman (5'11, 195); 15 – Jaydun Colbert – (redshirt) sophomore (5'11, 180); 17 – Lennis Finister Jr. – freshman (6'0, 170); 20 – Mike Mitchell – (redshirt) sophomore (5'11, 165); 21 – Kyree Langley – sophomore (5'11, 180); 23 – Zack Vicknair – (redshirt) junior (6'0, 195); 24 – Tylon Cooper – junior (6'0, 180); 24 – Jylan Wiltz – (redshirt) freshman (5'8, 160); 25 – Ian Conerly-Goodly – senior (6'0, 175); 26 – Tyler Mansfield – (redshirt) junior (5'11, 160); 27 – Carter Byrd – freshman (6'1, 190); 27 – Jakyri Jones – junior (5'10, 190); 28 – Zach Johnson – sophomore (6'0, 180); 36 – Richard McKneely – (redshirt) sophomore (6'0, 180); Placekickers: 26 – Drew Talley – freshman (5'10, 165); 29 – Guillermo Garcia – graduate (6'1, 200); Punters: 46 – Jack Hunter – (redshirt) sophomore (6'3, 215); 47 – Alec Mahler – K/P – (redshirt) junior (5'10, 205); Long snapper: 28 – Andre Callais Jr. – (redshirt) sophomore (5'9, 210); 31 – Will Davidson – sophomore (5'11, 185)
Source and player details, 2025 Southeastern Louisiana Lions (6/16/2025):

== Rankings ==
Ranking movements Legend: ██ Increase in ranking ██ Decrease in ranking — = Not ranked RV = Received votes т = Tied with team above or below
	Week														
Poll	Pre	1	2	3	4	5	6	7	8	9	10	11	12	13	Final
STATS FCS	RV	—	—	RV	—	—	—	RV	RV	21	19	23	21	17т	19
Coaches	RV	RV	RV	RV	RV	RV	RV	22	19	16	14	21	20	15	19

== 2026 NFL draft ==
The following Lions player(s) were selected in the 2026 NFL draft.

Player	Position	School	Draft round	Round pick	Overall pick	Team
Kaleb Proctor	DT	Southeastern Louisiana Lions	4	4	104	Arizona Cardinals
