= 2025 Nicholls Colonels football team =

American college football season

2025 Nicholls Colonels football
- Conference: Southland Conference
- Record: 4–8 (4–4 SLC)
- Head coach: Tommy Rybacki (1st season)
- Offensive coordinator: Gabe Fertitta (1st season)
- Offensive scheme: Spread
- Defensive coordinator: Darion Monroe (1st season)
- Base defense: Multiple 4–3
- Home stadium: Manning Field at John L. Guidry Stadium

2025 Southland Conference football standings
	Conf.			Overall
Team	W		L	W		L
No. 7 Stephen F. Austin $^	8	–	0	11	–	3
No. 19 Southeastern Louisiana ^	7	–	1	9	–	4
No. 24 Lamar ^	5	–	3	8	–	5
UT Rio Grande Valley	5	–	3	9	–	3
Nicholls	4	–	4	4	–	8
McNeese	4	–	4	5	–	7
East Texas A&M	3	–	5	3	–	9
Incarnate Word	3	–	5	5	–	7
Houston Christian	1	–	7	2	–	10
Northwestern State	0	–	8	1	–	11
$ – Conference champion; ^ – FCS playoff participant; Rankings from STATS Poll

The 2025 Nicholls Colonels football team represented Nicholls State University in the 2025 NCAA Division I FCS football season. The Colonels played their home games at Manning Field at John L. Guidry Stadium in Thibodaux, Louisiana, and competed in the Southland Conference. They were led by first-year head coach Tommy Rybacki.

== Offseason ==
=== Outgoing ===
Player	Position	Destination
Cru Blanchard	OL	Chowan
Quincy Brown	WR	Texas State
Eli Ennis	LB	UAB
Kershawn Fisher	LB	Western Michigan
Tyler Morton	DB	Incarnate Word
Pat McQuaide	QB	Villanova
Robbie Pizzolato	OL	Tulane
Jaylon Spears	RB	Incarnate Word
Josh Wax	DB	Unknown

=== Incoming ===
Player	Position	Previous school
Kamron Barnes	OL	Southern Miss
Kyron Barnes	OL	Southern Miss
Damondrick Blackburn	RB	Louisiana
Gregory Harding Jr.	DB	Louisiana Christian
Allen Hamilton	QB/DB	Louisiana Christian
Tamaj Hoffman	RB	Delta State
Deuce Hogan	QB	New Mexico State
Jacob Hood	OL	Nebraska
Pax Hughes	TE	Southern Miss
Everett Hunter	TE	New Mexico
Landon Ibieta	WR	LSU
DK Kency Jr.	RB	LSU
Joey Lightfoot	DL	UTEP
Travin Moore	DB	Louisiana
Gavin Nelson	DL	Mississippi State
Jordan Okelo-Johnson	DL	Southern Miss
Klabron Pollard	OL	Southern Miss
Elijah Sabbatini	DB	Southern Miss
Jake Scianna	LB	Louisville
Jordan Smith	WR	New Mexico State
William Stewart	LS	Memphis

== Schedule ==
Date	Time	Opponent	Rank	Site	TV	Result	Attendance
August 23	12:00 pm	No. 5 Incarnate Word		Manning Field at John L. Guidry Stadium; Thibodaux, LA	ESPN2	W 20–6	8,779
August 30	6:00 pm	at Troy*		Veterans Memorial Stadium; Troy, AL	ESPN+	L 20–38	25,546
September 6	6:00 pm	West Georgia*	No. 22	Manning Field at John L. Guidry Stadium; Thibodaux, LA	ESPN+	L 10–34	5,456
September 20	7:00 pm	at Texas State*		UFCU Stadium; San Marcos, TX (Battle for the Paddle)	ESPN+	L 3–35	31,500
September 27	5:00 pm	at Eastern Kentucky*		Roy Kidd Stadium; Richmond, KY	ESPN+	L 7–27	8,239
October 4	3:00 pm	at No. 20 Lamar		Provost Umphrey Stadium; Beaumont, TX	ESPN+	L 17–24	5,433
October 18	6:00 pm	at No. 25 Stephen F. Austin		Homer Bryce Stadium; Nacogdoches, TX	ESPN+	L 7–34	7,141
October 25	3:00 pm	McNeese		Manning Field at John L. Guidry Stadium; Thibodaux, LA	ESPN+	W 31–7	3,476
November 1	3:00 pm	Houston Christian^{†}		Manning Field at John L. Guidry Stadium; Thibodaux, LA	ESPN+	W 31–7	6,524
November 8	5:00 pm	at UT Rio Grande Valley		Robert and Janet Vackar Stadium; Edinburg, TX	ESPN+	L 21–28	12,117
November 15	3:00 pm	Northwestern State		Manning Field at John L. Guidry Stadium; Thibodaux, LA (NSU Challenge)	ESPN+	W 26–21	7,046
November 20	6:00 pm	at No. 21 Southeastern Louisiana		Strawberry Stadium; Hammond, LA (River Bell Classic)	ESPN+	L 26–38	6,346
*Non-conference game; ^{†}Homecoming; Rankings from STATS Poll released prior to the game; All times are in Central time

== Rankings ==
Ranking movements Legend: ██ Increase in ranking ██ Decrease in ranking — = Not ranked RV = Received votes т = Tied with team above or below
	Week														
Poll	Pre	1	2	3	4	5	6	7	8	9	10	11	12	13	Final
STATS	—	22	RV	RV	—	—	—	—	—	—	—	—	—	—	—
Coaches	—	25т	RV	RV	—	—	—	—	—	—	—	—	—	—	—

== Game summaries ==
=== No. 5 Incarnate Word ===
No. 5 Incarnate Word Cardinals (0–0) at Nicholls Colonels (0–0) – Game summary

Quarter	1	2	3	4	Total
No. 5 Cardinals	3	0	3	0	6
Colonels	10	3	0	7	20

at Manning Field at John L. Guidry Stadium, Thibodaux, Louisiana

- Date: August 23
- Game time: 12:00 p.m. CDT
- Game weather: Sunny, 88 °F (31 °C)
- Game attendance: 8,779
- Referee: James Brookhart
- TV announcers (ESPN2): Chuckie Kempf (play-by-play) and Rene Ingoglia (analyst)
- Box score, Recap

Game information
First quarter
- UIW – Will Farris 24-yard field goal, 11:07. Cardinals 3–0. Drive: 10 plays, 58 yards, 3:47.
- NICH – Gabriel Showalter 38-yard field goal, 0:48. Tied 3–3. Drive: 8 plays, 31 yards, 4:04.
- NICH – Ty Marsh 29-yard interception return (Gabriel Showalter kick), 0:38. Colonels 10–3.

Second quarter

- NICH – Gabriel Showalter 43-yard field goal, 11:57. Colonels 13–3. Drive: 6 plays, 28 yards, 2:15.

Third quarter

- UIW – Will Farris 24-yard field goal, 10:30. Colonels 13–6. Drive: 4 plays, 3 yards, 1:20.

Fourth quarter

- NICH – Karaaz Johnson 55-yard pass from Deuce Hogan (Gabriel Showalter kick), 9:26. Colonels 20–6. Drive: 6 plays, 87 yards, 1:54.

Statistics	UIW	NICH
First downs	15	14
Total yards	204	287
Rushing yards	16	66
Passing yards	188	221
Turnovers	4	1
Time of possession	29:05	29:57

Team	Category	Player	Statistics
Incarnate Word	Passing	Richard Torres	23/35, 175 yards, 3 INT
Incarnate Word	Rushing	Jaylon Spears	15 rushes, 49 yards
Incarnate Word	Receiving	Chedon James	5 receptions, 59 yards
Nicholls	Passing	Deuce Hogan	21/35, 221 yards, TD
Nicholls	Rushing	Jordan Poole	7 rushes, 23 yards
Nicholls	Receiving	Karaaz Johnson	2 receptions, 58 yards, TD

=== at Troy (FBS) ===
Nicholls Colonels (1–0) at Troy Trojans (FBS) (0–0) – Game summary

Quarter	1	2	3	4	Total
Colonels	0	10	7	3	20
Trojans (FBS)	0	7	3	28	38

at Veterans Memorial Stadium • Troy, AL

- Date: August 30, 2025
- Game time: 6:00 PM CDT
- Game attendance: 25,546
- Referee: Ted Pitts
- TV announcers (ESPN+): Will Kollmeyer (play-by-play), Ben Stanfield (analyst), and Junior Louissaint (sideline)

Game information

First quarter

- No scoring plays.

Second quarter

- NICH – Gabriel Showalter 45-yard field goal, 10:42. Colonels 3–0. Drive: 5 plays, 23 yards, 3:18.
- NICH – Miequle Brock Jr. 3-yard run (Gabriel Showalter kick), 2:14. Colonels 10–0. Drive: 8 plays, 65 yards, 3:35.
- TROY – Roman Mothershed 27-yard pass from Goose Crowder (Scott Taylor Renfroe kick), 1:01. Colonels 10–7. Drive: 9 plays, 70 yards, 1:08.

Third quarter

- NICH – Miequle Brock Jr. 58-yard pass from Deuce Hogan (Gabriel Showalter kick), 12:03. Colonels 17–7. Drive: 5 plays, 75 yards, 2:57.
- TROY – Scott Taylor Renfroe 24-yard field goal, 5:36. Colonels 17–10. Drive: 11 plays, 66 yards, 6:23.

Fourth quarter

- TROY – Goose Crowder 16-yard run (Scott Taylor Renfroe kick), 14:09. Tied 17–17. Drive: 10 plays, 58 yards, 4:33.
- NICH – Gabriel Showalter 22-yard field goal, 10:41. Colonels 20–17. Drive: 7 plays, 70 yards, 3:28.
- TROY – Tray Taylor 28-yard pass from Goose Crowder (Scott Taylor Renfroe kick), 8:13. Trojans 24–20. Drive: 7 plays, 66 yards, 2:23.
- TROY – Tae Meadows 47-yard run (Scott Taylor Renfroe kick), 6:08. Trojans 31–20. Drive: 1 play, 47 yards, 0:09.
- TROY – Ethan Conner 5-yard pass from Goose Crowder (Scott Taylor Renfroe kick), 1:56. Trojans 38–20. Drive: 5 plays, 44 yards, 2:13.

Statistics	NICH	TROY
First downs	16	23
Plays–yards	52–249	68–416
Rushes–yards	25–65	44–272
Passing yards	184	144
Passing: Comp–Att–Int	21–27–1	14–24–0
Turnovers	1	0
Time of possession	29:13	30:47

Team	Category	Player	Statistics
Nicholls	Passing	Deuce Hogan	21/27, 184 yards, TD, INT
Nicholls	Rushing	Tamaj Hoffman	9 carries, 52 yards
Nicholls	Receiving	Miequle Brock Jr.	6 receptions, 87 yards, TD
Troy	Passing	Goose Crowder	14/24, 144 yards, 3 TD
Troy	Rushing	Tae Meadows	23 carries, 186 yards, TD
Troy	Receiving	Roman Mothershed	2 receptions, 32 yards, TD

=== West Georgia ===
West Georgia Wolves (1–0) at No. 22 Nicholls Colonels (1–1) – Game summary

Quarter	1	2	3	4	Total
Wolves	7	7	10	10	34
No. 22 Colonels	0	3	0	7	10

at Manning Field at John L. Guidry Stadium, Thibodaux, Louisiana

- Date: September 6
- Game time: 6:00 PM CDT
- TV announcers (ESPN+): Jeff Palermo (play-by-play) and Wayde Keiser (analyst)

Statistics	UWG	NICH
First downs	28	9
Total yards	405	180
Rushing yards	342	114
Passing yards	63	66
Turnovers	3	1
Time of possession	38:41	21:19

Team	Category	Player	Statistics
West Georgia	Passing	Davin Wydner	7/21, 63 yards, 2 TD, 1 INT
West Georgia	Rushing	Latrelle Murrell	29 yards, 170 yards
West Georgia	Receiving	DeAndre Buchannon	2 reception, 28 yards, 1 TD
Nicholls	Passing	Deuce Hogan	11/25, 114 yards, 1 TD, 1 INT
Nicholls	Rushing	Miequle Brock Jr.	11 carries, 61 yards
Nicholls	Receiving	Jackson Dufrene	1 receptions, 44 yards, 1 TD

=== at Texas State (FBS, Battle for the Paddle) ===
Nicholls Colonels (1–2) at Texas State Bobcats (FBS) (2–1) – Game summary

Quarter	1	2	3	4	Total
Colonels	3	0	0	0	3
Bobcats (FBS)	7	21	7	0	35

at UFCU Stadium, San Marcos, TX

- Date: September 20
- Game time: 7:00 PM CDT
- Game weather: Cloudy
- Game attendance: 31,500
- Referee: Marshall Lewis
- TV announcers (ESPN+): Brant Freeman (play-by-play) and Keith Moreland (analyst)

Game information

First quarter

- (9:15) TXST – Brad Jackson 9-yard run, Tyler Robles kick (Drive: 13 plays, 92 yards, 5:32; Texas State 7–0)
- (1:52) NICH – Gabriel Showalter 32-yard field goal (Drive: 13 plays, 60 yards, 7:23; Texas State 7–3)

Second quarter

- (14:17) TXST – Brad Jackson 4-yard run, Tyler Robles kick (Drive: 6 plays, 44 yards, 2:34; Texas State 14–3)
- (8:33) TXST – Torrance Burgess Jr. 7-yard run, Tyler Robles kick (Drive: 8 plays, 92 yards, 3:34; Texas State 21–3)
- (2:17) TXST – Lincoln Pare 9-yard run, Tyler Robles kick (Drive: 12 plays, 85 yards, 3:22; Texas State 28–3)

Third quarter

- (2:38) TXST – Greg Burrell 5-yard run, Tyler Robles kick (Drive: 11 plays, 46 yards, 4:30; Texas State 35–3)

Fourth quarter

- No scoring plays.

Statistics	NICH	TXST
First downs	17	25
Plays–yards	64–224	69–401
Rushes–yards	42–127	47–207
Passing yards	97	194
Passing: comp–att–int	15–22–1	14–22–0
Turnovers	1	1
Time of possession	33:09	26:51

Team	Category	Player	Statistics
Nicholls	Passing	Deuce Hogan	15/21, 97 yards, INT
Nicholls	Rushing	Miequle Brock Jr.	11 carries, 59 yards
Nicholls	Receiving	Miequle Brock Jr.	6 receptions, 36 yards
Texas State	Passing	Brad Jackson	13/20, 180 yards
Texas State	Rushing	Lincoln Pare	15 carries, 64 yards, TD
Texas State	Receiving	Kylen Evans	4 receptions, 88 yards

=== at Eastern Kentucky ===
Nicholls Colonels (1–3) at Eastern Kentucky Colonels (1–3) – Game summary

Quarter	1	2	3	4	Total
Nicholls	7	0	0	0	7
Eastern Kentucky	0	7	10	10	27

at Roy Kidd Stadium, Richmond, Kentucky

- Date: September 27
- Game time: 5:00 PM CDT
- Game attendance: 8,239
- TV announcers (ESPN+): Greg Stotelmyer (play-by-play), Jim Tirey (analyst) and Maggie Davis (sideline)

Statistics	NICH	EKU
First downs	16	14
Total yards	330	314
Rushing yards	117	242
Passing yards	213	72
Turnovers	3	0
Time of possession	31:47	28:13

Team	Category	Player	Statistics
Nicholls	Passing	Deuce Hogan	20/31, 213 yards, 1 TD, 2 INT
Nicholls	Rushing	Miequle Brock Jr.	12 carries, 65 yards
Nicholls	Receiving	Miequle Brock Jr.	3 receptions, 67 yards, 1 TD
Eastern Kentucky	Passing	Myles Burkett	7/21, 72 yards, 1 TD
Eastern Kentucky	Rushing	Brady Hensley	14 carries, 148 yards, 1 TD
Eastern Kentucky	Receiving	Dequan Stanley	3 receptions, 32 yards, 1 TD

=== at No. 20 Lamar ===
Nicholls Colonels (1–4) at No. 20 Lamar Cardinals (3–1) – Game summary

Quarter	1	2	3	4	Total
Colonels	14	0	3	0	17
No. 20 Cardinals	7	10	0	7	24

at Provost Umphrey Stadium, Beaumont, Texas

- Date: October 4
- Game time: 3:00 PM CDT
- Game attendance: 5,433
- TV: ESPN+

Statistics	NICH	LAM
First downs	18	16
Total yards	348	337
Rushing yards	175	237
Passing yards	173	100
Turnovers	0	1
Time of possession	31:48	28:12

Team	Category	Player	Statistics
Nicholls	Passing	Deuce Hogan	21/38, 166 yards
Nicholls	Rushing	Shane Lee	3 carries, 109 yards, 1 TD
Nicholls	Receiving	Amari Clayton	3 receptions, 39 yards
Lamar	Passing	Aiden McCown	12/22, 237 yards, 1 TD, 1 IHT
Lamar	Rushing	LaDamian McDowell	11 carries, 41 yards
Lamar	Receiving	Blake Thomas	2 receptions, 84 yards, 1 TD

=== at No. 25 Stephen F. Austin ===
Nicholls Colonels (1–5) at No. 25 Stephen F. Austin Lumberjacks (4–2) – Game summary

Quarter	1	2	Total
Colonels			0
No. 25 Lumberjacks			0

at Homer Bryce Stadium, Nacogdoches, Texas

- Date: October 18
- Game time: 6:00 PM CDT
- TV: ESPN+

Statistics	NICH	SFA
First downs		
Total yards		
Rushing yards		
Passing yards		
Turnovers		
Time of possession		

Team	Category	Player	Statistics
Nicholls	Passing		
Nicholls	Rushing		
Nicholls	Receiving		
Stephen F. Austin	Passing		
Stephen F. Austin	Rushing		
Stephen F. Austin	Receiving		

=== McNeese ===
McNeese Cowboys (2–5) at Nicholls Colonels (1–6) – Game summary

Quarter	1	2	Total
Cowboys			0
Colonels			0

at Manning Field at John L. Guidry Stadium, Thibodaux, Louisiana

- Date: October 25
- TV: ESPN+

Statistics	MCN	NICH
First downs		
Total yards		
Rushing yards		
Passing yards		
Turnovers		
Time of possession		

Team	Category	Player	Statistics
McNeese	Passing		
McNeese	Rushing		
McNeese	Receiving		
Nicholls	Passing		
Nicholls	Rushing		
Nicholls	Receiving		

=== Houston Christian ===
Houston Christian Huskies (2–6) at Nicholls Colonels (2–6) – Game summary

Quarter	1	2	Total
Huskies			0
Colonels			0

at Manning Field at John L. Guidry Stadium, Thibodaux, Louisiana

- Date: November 1
- Game time: 3:00 PM CDT

Statistics	HCU	NICH
First downs		
Total yards		
Rushing yards		
Passing yards		
Turnovers		
Time of possession		

Team	Category	Player	Statistics
Houston Christian	Passing		
Houston Christian	Rushing		
Houston Christian	Receiving		
Nicholls	Passing		
Nicholls	Rushing		
Nicholls	Receiving		

=== at UT Rio Grande Valley ===
Nicholls Colonels (3–6) at UT Rio Grande Valley Vaqueros (6–3) – Game summary

Quarter	1	2	3	4	Total
Colonels	0	7	7	7	21
Vaqueros	7	7	7	7	28

at Robert and Janet Vackar Stadium, Edinburg, Texas

- Date: November 8
- Game time: 5:00 p.m. CDT
- Game weather: Sunny, 92 °F (33 °C)
- Game attendance: 12,177
- Referee: Gary Leeper
- TV announcers (ESPN+): Mark May (pla-by-play), Aaron Saenz (analyst) and Jaeda Rael (sideline)

Game information
First quarter
- RGV – Tony Diaz 4-yard pass from Eddie Lee Marburger (Brysen Gardner kick), 3:42. Vaqueros 7–0. Drive: 10 plays, 59 yards, 6:32.

Second quarter

- NICH – Miequle Brock Jr. 4-yard run (Gabriel Showalter kick), 12:10. Tied 7–7. Drive: 16 plays, 75 yards, 6:32.
- RGV – Nathan Denney 4-yard run (Brysen Gardner kick), 4:22. Vaqueros 14–7. Drive: 14 plays, 94 yards, 5:14.

Third quarter

- NICH – Everett Hunter 16-yard pass from Ean Rodrigue (Gabriel Showalter kick), 7:22. Tied 14–14. Drive: 2 plays, 22 yards, 0:50.
- RGV – Nathan Denney 7-yard run (Brysen Gardner kick), 3:29. Vaqueros 21–14. Drive: 2 plays, 35 yards, 0:42.

Fourth quarter

- RGV – Tavian Cord 44-yard pass from Eddie Lee Marburger (Brysen Gardner kick), 10:15. Vaqueros 28–14. Drive: 9 plays, 65 yards, 3:31.
- NICH – Shane Lee 8-yard run (Gabriel Showalter kick), 6:14. Vaqueros 28–21. Drive: 10 plays, 66 yards, 4:01.

Statistics	NICH	RGV
First downs	20	19
Total yards	327	392
Rushing yards	126	145
Passing yards	201	247
Turnovers	2	1
Time of possession	32:23	27:37

Team	Category	Player	Statistics
Nicholls	Passing	Ean Rodrigue	19/32, 193 yards, TD
Nicholls	Rushing	Shane Lee	13 carries, 56 yards, TD
Nicholls	Receiving	Scrappy Osby	6 receptions, 66 yards
UT Rio Grande Valley	Passing	Eddie Lee Marburger	20/30, 247 yards, 2 TD, INT
UT Rio Grande Valley	Rushing	Nathan Denney	25 carries, 120 yards, 2 TD
UT Rio Grande Valley	Receiving	Tavian Cord	4 receptions, 84 yards, TD

=== Northwestern State (NSU Challenge) ===
Northwestern State Demons at Nicholls Colonels – Game summary

Quarter	1	2	Total
Demons			0
Colonels			0

at Manning Field at John L. Guidry Stadium, Thibodaux, Louisiana

- Date: November 15

Statistics	NWST	NICH
First downs		
Total yards		
Rushing yards		
Passing yards		
Turnovers		
Time of possession		

Team	Category	Player	Statistics
Northwestern State	Passing		
Northwestern State	Rushing		
Northwestern State	Receiving		
Nicholls	Passing		
Nicholls	Rushing		
Nicholls	Receiving		

=== at No. 21 Southeastern Louisiana (River Bell Classic) ===
Nicholls Colonels (4–7) at No. 21 Southeastern Louisiana Lions (8–3) – Game summary

Quarter	1	2	Total
Colonels			0
No. 21 Lions			0

at Strawberry Stadium, Hammond, Louisiana

- Date: November 20
- Game time: 6:00 PM CST
- TV: ESPN+

Statistics	NICH	SELA
First downs		
Total yards		
Rushing yards		
Passing yards		
Turnovers		
Time of possession		

Team	Category	Player	Statistics
Nicholls	Passing		
Nicholls	Rushing		
Nicholls	Receiving		
Southeastern Louisiana	Passing		
Southeastern Louisiana	Rushing		
Southeastern Louisiana	Receiving		

== Personnel ==
2025 Nicholls Colonels football team roster
Players
Coaches
Offense

Pos.	#	Name	Class
WR	1	Landon Ibieta	Jr
QB	2	Deuce Hogan	Jr
WR	3	Karaaz Johnson	So
WR	6	Scrappy Osby	Jr
QB	7	Jackson Firmin	Fr
QB	11	Ean Rodrigue	So
WR	12	Jordan Smith	Sr
WR	13	Jackson Dufrene	So
WR	14	Dany'e Brooks	Sr
QB	15	Preston Welch	Fr
QB	16	Christian Arceneaux	Jr
WR	17	Tank McMath	Sr
RB	20	Carsen Hebert	Fr
RB	22	Miequle Brock	So
WR	23	Jason Barnes Jr.	Jr
RB	24	Shane Lee	Fr
RB	26	Jonathan Dartez	Fr
RB	30	Corey Warren Jr.	Sr
RB	31	Dedric Lastie	Fr
RB	32	Jayden Milton	So
WR	34	Brian McQuaide	Fr
RB	35	Tamaj Hoffman	Jr
TE	38	Jeffrey Diedrich	Fr
RB	39	Kayden Andoh	Fr
RB	40	Damondrick Blackburn	So
TE	45	Noah Onyia	Fr
TE	47	Pax Hughes	So
TE	48	Scott White	So
OL	50	Kamron Barnes	Jr
OL	51	Kyron Barnes	Jr
OL	52	Klabron Pollard	Jr
OL	54	Ja'Mard Jones Jr.	Fr
OL	56	Justin Howard	So
OL	57	Braxton Scriber	Fr
OL	59	Jacob Carpenter	Fr
OL	60	Jordan Aaron	Sr
OL	62	Joe Kirby	Fr
OL	63	Hamza Rahman	So
OL	65	Ryan Brungart	Fr
OL	66	Sameij Scott	Jr
OL	67	Marcus Garcia	Fr
OL	69	Joseph Bradford	Sr
OL	70	Jacob Johnson	So
OL	71	Jacob Hood	Jr
OL	74	Preston Jones	Fr
OL	75	Enzo Marino	Fr
OL	76	Ryan Bernard	Jr
OL	77	Caleb Smith	Fr
OL	79	Beau Webb	Fr
WR	80	Amari Clayton	Fr
TE	81	Treylin Whaley	Jr
TE	83	Everett Hunter	Jr
WR	84	Paxton Lafont	Fr
WR	85	Christian McNees	So
WR	86	Camare Hampton	Fr
WR	87	Cohen LeBlanc	Fr
WR	88	Kylin Wheeler	Fr
TE	89	Jack Purser	Fr

Defense

Pos.	#	Name	Class
DB	0	Laurence Sullivan Jr.	Sr
DB	4	Ty Marsh	Sr
LB	7	Jake Dalmado	Sr
DB	8	Elijah Sabbatini	Sr
DB	9	Greg Jackson Jr.	Jr
LB	10	Hayden Shaheen	Sr
DB	12	Anthony Rogers	Fr
LB	13	Kylin White	Sr
DB	14	Reece Turner	Fr
DB	15	Brailon Raymond	So
LB	19	Cale Daigle	Fr
LB	21	Jake Scianna	Fr
DB	23	Gavin Duplechin	Fr
DB	24	Braylon Noel	Fr
LB	25	Alec Haynes	Fr
DB	26	Gregory Harding Jr.	Fr
DB	28	Marcus Dawson	Fr
DB	29	Jamison Lindsey	GS
LB	30	Taylor Thibodaux	Fr
LB	31	Mace Melancon	Fr
DB	32	Jeremie Elzy	Fr
DB	33	Shermar Carter	So
DB	34	Travin Moore	So
DB	35	Ethan Lee	Sr
DB	36	Justin Helper	So
DB	37	Hunter Addison	So
DB	37	Jy'Heim Williams	Fr
DB	38	Allen Hamilton	So
DB	39	Tasmin Showers	Fr
LB	41	Dominic Logiudice	Jr
LB	42	David Cresson	Sr
LB	43	Trent Santos	Fr
DL	45	Alex Villavaso	Sr
LB	46	Keith Newsome Jr.	Fr
DB	47	Lawrence Bangura	Fr
LB	49	Darrel Gibson	So
LB	50	Keidrick Richardson	Fr
DL	51	Joe Mason	Sr
LB	52	Andrew Cavalier	So
LB	53	Jake Newchurch	Jr
DL	56	Rasheed Lovelace	Jr
LB	58	Arrington Adams	Fr
LB	60	Aiden Cain	Fr
DL	65	Christian Mannino	Sr
DL	73	Kelvin Gray	Fr
DL	90	Aidan Clements	So
DL	91	Chase Chesser	Fr
DL	92	Josh Johnson	So
DL	93	Talan Bingham	Fr
DL	94	Griffin Ellis	Fr
DL	95	Shay Collins	Fr
DL	96	Gavin Nelson	Jr
DL	97	Jordan Okelo-Johnson	Fr
DL	98	Dale Smith	Fr
DL	99	Joey Lightfoot	So

Special teams

Pos.	#	Name	Class
P	16	Pharrell Harewood	Fr
K, P	25	Zachry Sugandi-Truitt	Fr
K	27	Sean Hebert	Fr
K	36	Gabe Showalter	Sr
LS	49	Josh Bellanger	So
LS	53	Craig Roth	So
LS	61	William Stewart	Sr

Head coach

- Tommy Rybacki (Jacksonville State)

Coordinators/assistant coaches

- Gabe Fertitta (Mississippi Christian)
  Offensive coordinator/qb
- Darion Monroe (Tulane)
  Defensive coordinator/secondary
- Webb Hamilton (Mississippi State)
  Special teams coordinator
- Logan Guerrera (Nicholls State)
  Tightends
- Collin Guggenheim (Nicholls State)
  Running backs
- Ben Mouton (Louisiana)
  Linebackers
- Sean Murphy (Millsaps)
  Wide receivers/recruiting coordinator
- Rob Snyder (LSU)
  Defensive line
- Seth Price (Arkansas State)
  Offensive line/run game coordinator

Legend

- (C) Team captain
- (S) Suspended
- (I) Ineligible
- Injured
- Redshirt

Roster
