= DeNarius McGhee =

American football player and coach (born 1991)

Denarius McGhee
UTSA Roadrunners
- Title: Wide receivers coach

Personal information
- Born: June 12, 1991 (age 35); McComb, Mississippi, U.S.
- Listed height: 6 ft 0 in (1.83 m)
- Listed weight: 210 lb (95 kg)

Career information
- High school: Trinity (Euless, Texas)
- College: Montana State
- NFL draft: 2014: undrafted

Career history

Playing
- Saskatchewan Roughriders (2014–2016)*
- * Offseason or practice squad member only

Coaching
- Montana State (2017) Quarterbacks coach; Montana State (2018–2019) Running backs coach; Houston Texans (2020–2023) Offensive assistant; New Orleans Saints (2024) Assistant wide receivers coach; Utah State (2025) Wide receivers coach; UTSA (2026–present) Wide receivers coach

Awards and highlights
- 2× Big Sky Conference Offensive MVP

DeNarius Devon McGhee (born June 12, 1991) is an American former football quarterback and current coach who is the wide receivers coach for UTSA. He played college football at Montana State University.

== Early life ==
An online feature on McGhee stated he was born in Mississippi, and for the first nine years of his life, he lived with his grandmother and aunt. Then he went to live with his mother for three years, and eventually moved down to Texas to live with his father. His father is a hero in McGhee's eyes since he worked for the sheriff department. McGhee's father was able to be there for him and help mold him to be the person he is today. McGhee attended Trinity Trojan High School in Euless, Texas. According to MSU Bobcats 2011 football roster, in his senior year he received All-District 5-5A and honorable mention, and he also led his team to the 5A Division 1 championship game. There, he earned MVP and the John Reddell Sportsmanship Award. In high school, he was not only an outstanding football player, but also participated in basketball, baseball, and track.

== College career ==
=== Freshman Year ===
In his freshman year, McGhee started as a redshirt. He played outstandingly his first year in college football and had one of the best seasons by a Bobcat quarterback. McGhee led the Bobcats to nine wins, the second highest in the school's history. He earned the Big Sky Offensive MVP and was voted the league's top newcomer, and was named National Freshman of the year by College Football Performance Awards and MSU's Sonny Holland Offensive MVP. He had the third-best season in the school's history and threw 3,163 yards. According to ESPN, in the “NCAA Division I-A Player Passing Statistics of 2011,” he would be in 29th right behind Russell Wilson of Wisconsin, who threw 3,175 yards. McGhee helped turn around the team and lowered the teams turnovers. In an article in the Billings Gazette, Greg Rachac said, “The Bobcats are off to their best start since 1978. And I believe McGhee is the reason for the renaissance.” When McGhee was a freshman, Brian Wright said, “DeNarius would be the first to admit he had plenty of areas in which to improve.” He knows he still has to grow, even though he had a superb and successful year as a quarterback for the Bobcats.

=== Sophomore Year ===
McGhee improved as an athlete from his freshman year to his sophomore year. Eastern Washington University's defensive coordinator John Graham said, “Nothing seems to rattle him, and I think he’s maybe even staying in the pocket longer and not panicking and taking off running as much as he did as a freshman.” The fall of his sophomore season, the team voted him one of the three captains. One of McGhee's best games of his sophomore season was against Portland State. His statistics were good; he completed 15 of his 22 passes, and had no turn overs. After that game against PSU, McGhee was awarded Big Sky Offensive Player of the Week. He was also in the running for the Walter Payton Award and was in the final 20, along with 9 other quarterbacks. McGhee led MSU to its first playoff win since 2006 when it beat New Hampshire 26–25 in Bozeman. McGhee ran for two touchdowns and threw for another as the Bobcats advanced to the FCS quarterfinals.

=== Junior Year ===
McGhee had another solid campaign in 2012 as he again led the Bobcats to a Big Sky Conference title and helped advance the team to the quarterfinals of the NCAA FCS playoffs where they defeated Stony Brook 16–10 in the first playoff night game at Bobcat Stadium to advance to the quarterfinals of the FCS playoffs for the second straight season. McGhee attempted (436) and completed more passes (288) and at a higher completion percentage (66.0) than in his previous two seasons at MSU. He earned first team All-America by the American Football Coaches Association (AFCA), his second BSC Offensive Player of the Year award and was first team All-BSC at quarterback. He ran his record as MSU's starting quarterback to 30–8 to become the all-time leader in wins in MSU history. He needs just four more wins to become the winningest quarterback in Big Sky Conference history. In the spring, McGhee was initiated into the Pi Kappa Alpha fraternity, where he became a highly active member. Eventually, he would live at the fraternity his senior year and would assume high level leadership positions within the organization.

=== Senior Year ===
McGhee suffered a separated shoulder on the last play of the second game of the season at Southern Methodist University. Playing near his hometown McGhee helped lead the Bobcats to a 22-5 first half lead and MSU still led 30–19 in the third quarter before SMU rallied and scored a touchdown with :12 seconds to play. MSU ran the hook-and-ladder for its last desperation attempt and McGhee completed a pass to Tanner Roderick, then got the ball back and was driven out of bounds landing on his right shoulder.

McGhee returned to the field three weeks later, playing in 10 games. He finished the 2013 season completing 175 of 265 passes for 2087 yards and eight touchdowns. He rushed for 248 yards in 83 attempts.

== Professional career ==
In October 2014, McGhee was signed to the practice roster of the Saskatchewan Roughriders of the Canadian Football League, but was cut later that month.

== Coaching career ==
Also in 2014, McGhee worked as a graduate assistant on the staff of the Florida Atlantic University college team. In 2015 and 2016, he was a graduate assistant for the North Carolina State University team.

It was announced in December 2016 that McGhee would return to Montana State to serve as the Bobcats' quarterbacks coach. In 2018 he became the running backs coach.

In January 2020, McGhee was hired by the Houston Texans as an offensive quality control coach. He was retained by the new coaching staff on March 10, 2021.

On February 21, 2024, the New Orleans Saints announced that they had hired McGhee as an assistant wide receivers coach.

On January 6, 2026, McGhee was hired by UTSA as the wide receivers coach.
