= Miles Davis (American football) =

American football player (born 2002)

Columbus Aviators
- Position: Running back
- Roster status: Unsigned draft pick

Personal information
- Born: January 30, 2002 (age 24); Lubbock, Texas, U.S.
- Listed height: 5 ft 11 in (1.80 m)
- Listed weight: 215 lb (98 kg)

Career information
- High school: Las Vegas (Las Vegas, Nevada)
- College: BYU (2020–2024); Utah State (2025)
- NFL draft: 2026: undrafted

Career history
- Carolina Panthers (2026)*; Columbus Aviators (2027-present)
- * Offseason or practice squad member only

Miles Davis (born January 30, 2002) is an American football running back. He played college football for the BYU Cougars and Utah State Aggies.

== Early life ==
Davis was born on January 30, 2002 in Lubbock, Texas. He attended Las Vegas High School in Las Vegas, Nevada. He was rated as a three-star recruit by 247Sports and committed to play college football for the BYU Cougars over UNLV.

== College career ==
=== BYU ===
As a freshman in 2020, Davis ran for 96 yards and two touchdowns on 15 carries, while also racking up four receptions for 43 yards. Since Davis shares a name with Jazz icon Miles Davis, also known as "the Sorcerer", BYU fans nicknamed Davis "the Scorcerer" during his freshman year due to his ability to get into the end zone. In 2021, he was redshirted. In week 4 of the 2022 season, Davis rushed for 131 yards, while also bringing in four passes for 22 yards in a victory over Wyoming. During the 2022 season, he rushed for 225 yards on 40 carries, while also hauling in six receptions for 27 yards. In 2023, Davis rushed for 78 yards on 16 carries. During the 2024 season, he played in eight games with one start, rushing 18 times for 76 yards. After the conclusion of the season, Davis entered the NCAA transfer portal.

=== Utah State ===
Davis transferred to play for the Utah State. In week one of the 2025 season, he ran for 88 yards and a touchdown, while also hauling in six receptions for 61 yards in a win against UTEP. Davis finished the 2025 season, rushing for 731 yards and eight carries, while also putting up 28 receptions for 201 yards and three touchdowns.

== Professional career ==
Pre-draft measurables
Height	Weight	Arm length	Hand span	Wingspan	40-yard dash	10-yard split	20-yard split	20-yard shuttle	Three-cone drill	Vertical jump	Broad jump	Bench press
5 ft 10 1/2 in (1.79 m)	211 lb (96 kg)	31 1/8 in (0.79 m)	9 in (0.23 m)	6 ft 1 3/4 in (1.87 m)	4.51 s	1.66 s	2.64 s	4.49 s	7.41 s	39.0 in (0.99 m)	10 ft 2 in (3.10 m)	15 reps
All values from Pro Day

After not being selected in the 2026 NFL draft, Davis signed with the Carolina Panthers as an undrafted free agent on May 18, 2026. He was waived by Carolina on August 29.
