= Travis Bush =

American college football coach

Current position
- Title: Head coach
- Team: UT Rio Grande Valley
- Conference: SLC
- Record: 9–3

Playing career
- 1995–2000: Texas State
- Position: Wide receiver

Coaching career (HC unless noted)
- 2000: San Marcos HS (TX) (QB/RB)
- 2001–2003: TCU (GA/asst. OL)
- 2004–2006: Texas State (WR)
- 2007–2009: Texas State (assoc. HC/co-OC/QB)
- 2010–2011: UTSA (OC/QB)
- 2012: Houston (OC/QB)
- 2013: Houston (asst. HC/co-OC/RB)
- 2014: Houston (asst. HC/OC/QB)
- 2015: Buffalo Bills (off. assistant)
- 2016–2020: Seguin HS (TX)
- 2021–2022: Canyon HS (New Braunfels, TX)
- 2023–present: UT Rio Grande Valley

Administrative career (AD unless noted)
- 2016–2020: Seguin ISD (TX)
- 2021–2022: Comal ISD (TX)

Head coaching record
- Overall: 9–3 (college); 36–37 (high school)

Travis Bush is an American football coach and former player. He is the first head football coach at University of Texas Rio Grande Valley (UTRGV). Previously, he was the head football coach and athletic director at Canyon High School, a position he held from 2021 to 2022. Before that, he was the head football coach and athletic director at Seguin High School from 2016 to 2020 and was the offensive coordinator for the University of Houston under head coach Tony Levine. While originally hired onto Levine's staff as running backs coach, Bush was promoted to the offensive coordinator position when his predecessor Mike Nesbitt resigned following Houston's first game of the 2012 season.

== Playing career ==
Travis Bush played as a high school quarterback on his father's team at Gregory-Portland High School in Portland, Texas. Graduating in 1995, Bush was a selection for the UIL AAAA All-State Team. He was then recruited by Texas State as a wide receiver, and graduated in 2000. It was during his time as a Texas State player that Bush became acquainted with Tony Levine, who was the wide receivers coach there from 1997 until 1999.

== Coaching career ==
After his graduation from Texas State, Bush became an assistant under his father at San Marcos High School, before becoming a graduate assistant at TCU where he served until 2003. In 2004, Bush returned to his alma mater at Texas State as wide receivers coach. During his time in this position, Texas State reached the 2005 NCAA Division I-AA national semifinals.

In 2007, he was promoted to co-offensive coordinator and associate head coach for Texas State, and the team's record was turned around to 8–5 by the 2008 season. This was one of only five winning seasons that Texas State had achieved over the past 23 years. That season, Texas State also claimed the Southland Conference championship, and Bush's offense ranked fifth in the NCAA Division I FCS. The following season, Texas State's record was 7–5.

In 2010, UTSA and head coach Larry Coker announced that they had hired Travis Bush as offensive coordinator for their inaugural season in 2011. However, he remained with UTSA for only one year before he decided to leave for Houston as running backs coach.

Following the resignation of Mike Nesbitt as Houston's offensive coordinator after the first game of 2012, Travis Bush was promoted to offensive coordinator by head coach Tony Levine.

== Head coaching record ==
=== College ===
Year	Team	Overall	Conference	Standing	Bowl/playoffs
UT Rio Grande Valley Vaqueros (Southland Conference) (2025–present)
2025	UT Rio Grande Valley	9–3	5–3	T–3rd	
UT Rio Grande Valley:		9–3	5–3		
Total:		9–3			

=== High school ===
Year	Team	Overall	Conference	Standing	Bowl/playoffs
Seguin Matadors () (2016–2020)
2016	Seguin	2–8	1–6	7th	
2017	Seguin	2–8	1–6	8th	
2018	Seguin	7–4	6–1	T-1st	Bi-District
2019	Seguin	5–6	5–2	3rd	Bi-District
2020	Seguin	7–3	6–1	T-1st	Bi-District
Seguin:		23–29	19–16		
Canyon Cougars () (2021–2022)
2021	Canyon	4–6	3–4	6th	
2022	Canyon	9–2	6–1	2nd	Bi-District
Canyon:		13–8	9–5		
Total:		36–37			
