= 2025 Incarnate Word Cardinals football team =

American college football season

2025 Incarnate Word Cardinals football
- Conference: Southland Conference
- Record: 5–7 (3–5 SLC)
- Head coach: Clint Killough (3rd season)
- Co-offensive coordinators: Kenny Hill (1st season); Nick Young (1st season)
- Offensive scheme: Spread
- Defensive coordinator: Jim Gush (3rd season)
- Co-defensive coordinators: Sam Bennett (1st season); Ben Olsen (1st season)
- Base defense: 4–2–5
- Home stadium: Gayle and Tom Benson Stadium

2025 Southland Conference football standings
	Conf.			Overall
Team	W		L	W		L
No. 7 Stephen F. Austin $^	8	–	0	11	–	3
No. 19 Southeastern Louisiana ^	7	–	1	9	–	4
No. 24 Lamar ^	5	–	3	8	–	5
UT Rio Grande Valley	5	–	3	9	–	3
Nicholls	4	–	4	4	–	8
McNeese	4	–	4	5	–	7
East Texas A&M	3	–	5	3	–	9
Incarnate Word	3	–	5	5	–	7
Houston Christian	1	–	7	2	–	10
Northwestern State	0	–	8	1	–	11
$ – Conference champion; ^ – FCS playoff participant; Rankings from STATS Poll

The 2025 Incarnate Word Cardinals football team represented the University of the Incarnate Word (UIW) as a member of the Southland Conference during the 2025 NCAA Division I FCS football season. The Cardinals played their home games at Gayle and Tom Benson Stadium in San Antonio, Texas. They were led by third-year head coach Clint Killough.

== Offseason ==
=== Transfers ===
==== Outgoing ====
Player	Position	Destination
Roy Alexander	WR	Texas Tech
Zach Calzada	QB	Kentucky
Chase Carter	DL	Memphis
Tylan Foster	LB	Eastern Illinois
River Gordon	OL	Abilene Christian
Devin Grant	DL	West Virginia
Tyler "TJ" Harold	DL	Tyler
Nolan Hay	OL	South Carolina
Solomon James	QB	UT Permian Basin
Rasheed Jackson	OL	TCU
Talon Lewin	QB	Ventura
Derrick Lewis	LB	Stephen F. Austin
Josh Pastrana	LB	Keiser
Isaiah Pedack	DL	Mississippi Valley State
Dekalon Taylor	RB	Colorado
Jaelon Travis	WR	Pittsburg State
Mister Williams	LB	San Diego State
Anquan Willis	RB	
Hunter Willis	LB	Trinity Valley

==== Incoming ====
Player	Position	Previous school
Deyon Batiste	QB	Wyoming
Joe Cadette	DE	Houston Christian
Pig Cage	DB	Louisiana Tech
EJ Colson	QB	UCF
Kobe Dillon	RB	Southern
Harlan Dixon	RB	Southeastern Louisiana
Jaylen Dotson	DB	Kent State
Will Faris	K	Vanderbilt
Kai Fernandes	DB	Appalachian State
Cam Foster	OL	Southern
Dewey Greene	DE	Southern Illinois
Brayden Hay	LB	Houston Christian
Chedon James	WR	Fresno State
Dylan Kirby	OL	Southern Utah
Ben McCreary	RB	West Texas A&M
Zach Mitchell	WR	Southern Utah
Tyler Morton	DB	Nicholls
Michael Pleas Jr.	LB	UT Martin
David Powers	LB	Wofford
Jachai Pulley	LB	Pasadena City
Austin Samaha	TE	Texas State
Jawuan Singletary	OL	New Mexico
Jaylon Spears	RB	Nicholls
Mike Stoker	OL	TCU
Reece Sylvester	DB	Washington State
Danny Valenzuela	OL	Northern Arizona
Tomsen Vickery	DE	Air Force
Jeremiah Young	DE	Independence

== Preseason ==
=== Preseason poll ===
The Southland Conference released its preseason poll on July 21. The Cardinals were picked to finish first in the conference and received fifteen first-place votes.

=== Preseason All–American Teams ===
The University of the Incarnate Word football team had six student-athletes named Stats Perform Preseason All-Americans ahead of the 2025 season.

Offense

1st Team

- Jalen Walthall – Wide receiver, RS-SR

2nd Team

- Chedon James – Wide receiver, RS-JR

3rd Team

- Traveon Newsome – Offensive lineman, RS-SR

Defense

2nd Team

- Tyler Morton – Defensive back, RS-SR

3rd Team

- Declan Williams – Defensive lineman, SR
- Jaylon Spears – All-purpose, RS-JR

== Schedule ==
Date	Time	Opponent	Rank	Site	TV	Result	Attendance
August 23	12:00 p.m.	at Nicholls	No. 5	Manning Field at John L. Guidry Stadium; Thibodaux, LA	ESPN2	L 6–20	8,779
August 30	6:00 p.m.	Eastern Washington*	No. 5	Gayle and Tom Benson Stadium; San Antonio, TX	ESPN+	W 31–21	2,263
September 13	2:30 p.m.	at UTSA*	No. 14	Alamodome; San Antonio, TX (Hometown Showdown)	ESPN+	L 20–48	20,421
September 20	3:00 p.m.	at No. 17 Northern Arizona*	No. 19	Walkup Skydome; Flagstaff, AZ	ESPN+	L 23–31	10,007
September 27	6:00 p.m.	No. 12 Abilene Christian*		Gayle and Tom Benson Stadium; San Antonio, TX	ESPN+	W 38–7	3,006
October 4	6:00 p.m.	Stephen F. Austin		Gayle and Tom Benson Stadium; San Antonio, TX	ESPN+	L 17–31	2,098
October 18	4:30 p.m.	East Texas A&M		Gayle and Tom Benson Stadium; San Antonio, TX	ESPN+	L 45–52	2,016
October 25	7:00 p.m.	at UT Rio Grande Valley		Robert and Janet Vackar Stadium; Edinburg, TX	ESPN+	L 28–56	12,649
November 1	2:00 p.m.	No. 14 Lamar^{†}		Gayle and Tom Benson Stadium; San Antonio, TX	ESPN+	W 24–17	2,680
November 8	1:00 p.m.	at Northwestern State		Harry Turpin Stadium; Natchitoches, LA	ESPN+	W 38–3	4,243
November 15	2:00 p.m.	No. 23 Southeastern Louisiana		Gayle and Tom Benson Stadium; San Antonio, TX	ESPN+	L 7–10	2,165
November 22	2:00 p.m.	at Houston Christian		Husky Stadium; Houston, TX	ESPN+	W 31–10	1,357
*Non-conference game; ^{†}Homecoming; Rankings from STATS Poll released prior to the game; All times are in Central time

== Personnel ==
=== Coaching staff ===
Name	Position	Alma mater	Joined staff
Clint Killough	Head coach	Incarnate Word (2015)	2018
Jim Gush	Associate head coach / defensive coordinator	Bucknell (1981)	2023
Ben Olson	Co-defensive coordinator / run game coordinator / defensive line	Eastern Illinois (2013)	2023
Kenny Hill	Co-offensive coordinator / running backs	TCU (2017)	2023
Nick Young	Co-offensive coordinator / offensive line	Toledo (2012)	2023
Willis White	Assistant head coach / wide receivers	Alabama State (2018)	2023
Sam Bennett	Co-defensive coordinator / Linebackers / academic coordinator	Texas Tech (2010)	2023
George Sanders	Pass game coordinator / defensive backs	Southwest Baptist (2016)	2023
Luke Pardee	Quarterbacks	TCU (2023)	2024
Ryan Allgood	Tight ends / recruiting coordinator	Oklahoma (2011)	2025
Tre Spragg	Defensive quality control / assistant defensive backs	Incarnate Word (2015)	2023
John Scifers	Special teams quality control / video coordinator	Incarnate Word (2021)	2023
Taylor Grimes	Offensive quality control	Incarnate Word (2022)	2024
Cody Dunn	Director of performance statistics	McGill (2021)	2022
Braden Strauss	Defensive graduate assistant - linebackers	Baylor	2024
Dalton Meyer	Offensive graduate assistant	Incarnate Word (2023)	2025
Shane Creamer	Offensive graduate assistant	Houston (2021)	2025
Davis Conley	Head strength and conditioning	LaGrange (2017)	2022
Dr. Kimberly Montez	Head football athletic trainer		2025
Reagan Longoria	Football operations and recruiting assistant		2025

=== Roster ===
2025 Incarnate Word Cardinals football
Quarterback: 2 EJ Colson – (redshirt) Freshman (6'1, 190); 7 Deyon Batiste – (redshirt) Freshman (6'5, 230); 15 Richard Torres – (redshirt) Junior (6'4, 225); 19 Mikey Moshier – Freshman (6'2, 215); Running back: 0 Lontrell Turner – Junior (5'11, 180); 1 Jaylon Spears – (redshirt) Junior (5'10, 200); 4 Isaiah Robinson – Graduate Student (6'0, 212); 9 Harlan Dixon – Graduate Student (6'1, 210); 20 Timothy Carter – (redshirt) Junior (6'0, 215); 24 Kobe Dillon – Graduate Student (6'0, 190); 28 Ben McCreary – Sophomore (5'10, 210); 29 Traveon Green – Freshman (5'9, 195); Wide receiver: 3 Chedon James – Junior (5'9, 175); 5 Zach Mitchell – (redshirt) Sophomore (5'10, 200); 6 Jalen Walthall – (redshirt) Senior (6'2, 180); 8 Patrick Bridges – (redshirt) Freshman (6'1, 195); 10 Isaiah Champagne – Freshman (5'10, 170); 11 Josh Lorick – Senior (6'0, 170); 14 Matthew Ramirez – Junior (6'0, 160); 17 Jameson Garcia – (redshirt) Sophomore (6'1, 190); 84 Jackson Hancock – Sophomore (5'10, 160); Tight end: 18 Jackson Lowe – Graduate Student (6'5, 237); 44 Austin Samaha – Senior (6'2, 255); 47 Dane Farley – (redshirt) Sophomore (6'1, 230); 85 Evan Drake – Freshman (6'5, 240); 87 Aidan Cardwell – Freshman (6'3, 215); 89 Logan Compton – Graduate Student (6'4, 245); Long snapper: 22 Bryce Felt – Senior (5'9, 180); 52 Jonas Halbrook – Sophomore (6'2, 220)	Offensive line: 50 Jawuan Singletary – C – Graduate Student (6'2, 310); 51 Kam Newhouse – OL – Freshman (6'3, 300); 54 Shontrail Key – T – Graduate Student (6'5, 290); 55 Danny Valenzuela – G – Graduate Student (6'3, 290); 56 Mike Stoker – T – (redshirt) Sophomore (6'6, 305); 58 Colton Carter – OL – Freshman (6'1, 275); 63 Lamont "LD" Smith – OL – (redshirt) Freshman (6'3, 260); 64 Ozzy Garcia – OL – Junior (6'1, 290); 65 Matthew Lewis – C – Freshman (6'3, 290); 66 Roderick Joseph – OL – Freshman (6'2, 290); 67 Frank Riggins – OL – Sophomore (6'4, 240); 68 David Hensley – G – (redshirt) Junior (6'4, 315); 70 Traveon Newsome – G – Graduate Student (6'2, 320); 71 Richard Grigg – T – Freshman (6'5, 285); 72 Cameron Foster – G/T – (redshirt) Senior (6'4, 315); 73 Caleb Flores – G/T – (redshirt) Junior (6'4, 279); 74 Christian Fitchett – T – (redshirt) Sophomore (6'5, 270); 76 Lawson Petty – G – (redshirt) Sophomore (6'3, 295); 77 Dylan Kirby – T – (redshirt) Freshman (6'6, 290); 78 Branon Jackson – G/T – Graduate Student (6'3, 295); 79 Adam May – T – (redshirt) Sophomore (6'6, 295); Defensive line: 3 Michael Pleas, Jr. – Edge – Graduate Student (6'3, 240); 9 Talib Salahuddin – DE – (redshirt) Senior (6'5, 245); 10 John Mathis – DT – (redshirt) Senior (6'2, 265); 14 Joe Cadette – Edge – Graduate Student (6'4, 240); 15 Dewey Greene – DE – Graduate Student (6'3, 260); 32 Tomsen Vickery – DE – Freshman (6'5, 240); 41 Terrell Elliott – DT – Senior (6'2, 300); 43 Emiliano Fears – DL – Junior (6'1, 215); 44 Jeremiah Young – DE – Sophomore (6'0, 255); 45 Logan Granville – DE – Junior (6'3, 230); 50 Jace Bardwell – DT – (redshirt) Freshman (6'2, 300); 69 David Brown – DT – Sophomore (6'1, 305); 90 Myron Warren – DT – Graduate Student (6'2, 275); 91 Lloyd Johnson – DL – (redshirt) Junior (6'2, 280); 92 Isaac Rimada – DL – Freshman (6'1, 225); 93 Danny McKenna – DL – Freshman (6'3, 227); 94 Ryan Vasquez – DL – Freshman (6'0, 240); 99 Josh Gonzalez – DT – (redshirt) Senior (6'3, 310)	Linebacker: 0 Declan Williams – Senior (6'2, 245); 1 Dune Smith – Graduate Student (5'10, 197); 11 Caleb Lewis – (redshirt) Senior (6'2, 235); 20 Braden Hay – Graduate Student (6'2, 200); 21 Jachai Pulley – Junior (6'1, 210); 22 Ja'Brelle Asberry – Freshman (6'0, 210); 30 Jordan Norwood – (redshirt) Junior (6'1, 215); 34 David Powers – Graduate Student (6'1, 230); 35 Leo Bisesi – Sophomore (6'0, 224); Defensive back: 2 Barry Dillon – DB – (redshirt) Sophomore (6'1, 175); 4 Chris Pierce – CB – Senior (6'0, 170); 5 Matt Kordas – S – (redshirt) Senior (6'1, 190); 6 Tyler Morton – S – (redshirt) Senior (5'10, 170); 7 Kendrick Stone – S – Graduate Student (6'2, 190); 8 A.J. Tisdell – CB – (redshirt) Sophomore (5'11, 195); 12 Reece Sylvester – S – (redshirt) Junior (6'1, 190); 13 Rome Jeffers – DB – Freshman (6'0, 195); 16 Jaylen Dotson – CB – (redshirt) Senior (5'10, 180); 17 Kaden Jammer – DB – Sophomore (5'9, 160); 18 D'Arius Carmouche – CB – Junior (6'0, 165); 19 Isaiah Pruitt – DB – (redshirt) Freshman (5'11, 180); 23 Drew Merrill – DB – Senior (6'0, 190); 24 James Tuayemie – CB – Graduate Student (5'11, 205); 25 Patrick Batiste – CB – (redshirt) Sophomore (6'0, 185); 31 Quinton "Pig" Cage – S – Graduate Student (5'9, 200); 33 Kai Fernandes – S – (redshirt) Freshman (5'11, 195); 37 Nehemiah Lowry – DB – Sophomore (5'8, 145); 39 Ethan Chavez – DB – Freshman (5'10, 175); 83 Taye Jackson – DB – Senior (6'2, 190); Kicker: 38 Will Faris – Graduate Student (6'1, 165); 95 Nick Rigas – Sophomore (6'0, 185); Punter: 27 Ryan Shamburger – Graduate Student (6'2, 195); 49 Ethan Brumgard – Sophomore (5'11, 190); Legend: (C) Team captain; (S) Suspended; (I) Ineligible; Injured; Redshirt

== Game summaries ==
=== At Nicholls ===
Uniform combination
Helmet	Jersey	Pants

Game One – No. 5 Incarnate Word Cardinals (0–0) at Nicholls Colonels (0–0)

Quarter	1	2	3	4	Total
No. 5 Cardinals	3	0	3	0	6
Colonels	10	3	0	7	20

at Manning Field at John L. Guidry Stadium, Thibodaux, LA

- Date: August 23
- Game time: 12:00 p.m.
- Game weather: Temperature: 88 • Wind: N 4 mph • Weather: Sunny
- Game attendance: 8,779
- Referee: James Brookhart
- TV announcers (ESPN2): Chuckie Kempf (play-by-play) and Rene Ingoglia (analyst)
- Box Score

Game information

First Quarter

- UIW – 11:07 Will Faris 24 yard field goal
  UIW 3–0 Drive: 10 plays, 58 yards, 3:47
- NICH – 0:48 Gabriel Showalter 38-yard field goal
  Tied 3–3 Drive: 8 plays, 31 yards, 4:04
- NICH – 0:38 Ty Marsh 29yard interception return, Gabriel Showalter kick
  NICH 10–7

Second Quarter

- NICH – 11:57 Gabriel Showalter 43-yard field goal
  NICH 13–3 Drive: 6 plays, 28 yards, 2:15

Third Quarter

- UIW – 10:30 Will Farris 24-yard field goal
  NICH 13–6 Drive: 4 plays, 3 yards, 1:20

Fourth Quarter

- NICH – 1:54 Karaaz Johnson 55-yard pass from Deuce Hogan, Gabriel Showalter kick
  NICH 20–6 Drive: 6 plays, 87 yards, 1:54

Statistics	UIW	NICH
First downs	15	14
Total yards	204	287
Rushing yards	16	66
Passing yards	188	221
Passing: Comp–Att–Int	24–36–3	21–36–0
Time of possession	29:05	29:57

Team	Category	Player	Statistics
Incarnate Word	Passing	Richard Torres	23/35, 175 yards, 3 INT
Incarnate Word	Rushing	Jaylon Spears	15 carries, 49 yards
Incarnate Word	Receiving	Chedon James	5 receptions, 59 yards
Nicholls	Passing	Deuce Hogan	21/35, 221 yards, TD
Nicholls	Rushing	Jordan Poole	7 carries, 23 yards
Nicholls	Receiving	Karaaz Johnson	2 receptions, 58 yards, TD

=== Eastern Washington ===
Uniform combination
Helmet	Jersey	Pants

Game Two – Eastern Washington Eagles (0–0) at No. 5 Incarnate Word Cardinals (0–1)

Quarter	1	2	3	4	Total
Eagles	0	21	0	0	21
No. 5 Cardinals	7	17	0	7	31

at Gayle and Tom Benson Stadium, San Antonio, TX

- Date: August 30
- Game time: 6:00 p.m.
- Game weather: Temperature: 102 • Wind: SE 9 mph • Weather: Sunny
- Game attendance: 2,263
- Referee: Gary Leeper
- TV announcers (ESPN+): Karl Schoening (play-by-play) & Sam Kaman (analyst)
- Box Score

Game information

First quarter

- UIW – 6:22 Harlan Dixon 10 yard run, Will Faris kick UIW 7–0 Drive: 13 plays, 80 yards, 4:45

Second quarter

- UIW – 13:15 Timothy Carter 1 yard run, Will Faris kick UIW 14–0 Drive: 6 plays, 49 yards, 1:31
- EWU – 9:55 Marceese Yetts 26 yard run, Soren McKee kick UIW 14–7 Drive: 7 plays, 71 yards, 3:12
- UIW – 9:43 Jameson Garcia 75 yard pass from Richard Torres, Will Faris kick UIW 21–7 Drive: 1 play, 75 yards, 0:12
- EWU – 7:45 Jared Taylor 3 yard run, Soren McKee kick UIW 21–14 Drive: 3 plays, 6 yards, 1:17
- EWU – 4:24 Marceese Yetts 24 yard run, Soren McKee kick UIW 21–21 Drive: 4 plays, 61 yards, 2:19
- UIW – 0:03 Will Faris 37 yard field goal UIW 24–21 Drive: 15 plays, 56 yards, 4:21

Third quarter

- No scoring plays.

Fourth quarter

- UIW – 2:48 Harlan Dixon 1 yard run, Will Faris kick UIW 31–21 Drive: 11 plays, 74 yards, 5:34

Statistics	EWU	UIW
First downs	15	27
Plays–yards	62–290	85–463
Rushes–yards	23–107	47–131
Passing yards	183	332
Passing: Comp–Att–Int	21–39–1	27–38–0
Turnovers	2	1
Time of possession	25:41	34:19

Team	Category	Player	Statistics
Eastern Washington	Passing	Jared Taylor	21/38, 183 yards
Eastern Washington	Rushing	Marceese Yetts	6 carries, 59 yards, 2 TD
Eastern Washington	Receiving	Marceese Yetts	7 receptions, 63 yards
Incarnate Word	Passing	Richard Torres	27/38, 332 yards, TD
Incarnate Word	Rushing	Harlan Dixon	14 carries, 75 yards, 2 TD
Incarnate Word	Receiving	Jameson Garcia	6 receptions, 146 yards, TD

=== @ UTSA (FBS) ===
Uniform combination
Helmet	Jersey	Pants

Game Three – No. 14 Incarnate Word Cardinals (1–1) at UTSA Roadrunners (FBS) (0–2)

Quarter	1	2	3	4	Total
No. 14 Cardinals	0	0	14	6	20
Roadrunners (FBS)	10	14	14	10	48

at Alamodome, San Antonio, TX

- Date: September 13
- Game time: 2:30 p.m.
- Game weather: Indoors
- Game attendance: 20,421
- Referee: Kevin Randall
- TV announcers (ESPN+): Jack Benjamin (play-by-play) and Dave Steckel (analyst)
- Box Score

Game information

First quarter

- (10:46) UTSA – Devin McCuin 13-yard pass from Owen McCown, Michael Petro kick (Drive: 6 plays, 33 yards, 2:39; UTSA 7–0)
- (5:28) UTSA – Michael Petro 26-yard field goal (Drive: 8 plays, 67 yards, 3:42; UTSA 10–0)

Second quarter

- (9:23) UTSA – Robert Henry Jr. 3-yard run, Michael Petro kick (Drive: 8 plays, 39 yards, 4:09; UTSA 17–0)
- (8:03) UTSA – Dan Dishman 4-yard pass from Owen McCown, Michael Petro kick (Drive: 1 play, 4 yards, 0:04; UTSA 24–0)

Third quarter

- (13:40) UTSA – Robert Henry Jr. 74-yard run, Michael Petro kick (Drive: 3 plays, 75 yards, 1:20; UTSA 31–0)
- (12:51) UIW – Chedon James 38-yard pass from EJ Colson, Will Faris kick (Drive: 3 plays, 50 yards, 0:49; UTSA 31–7)
- (12:04) UTSA – AJ Wilson 77-yard pass from Owen McCown, Michael Petro kick (Drive: 2 plays, 81 yards, 0:42; UTSA 38–7)
- (7:55) UIW – Chedon James 15-yard pass from EJ Colson, Will Faris kick (Drive: 11 plays, 75 yards, 4:09; UTSA 38–14)

Fourth quarter

- (9:19) UTSA – Michael Petro 31-yard field goal (Drive: 7 plays, 42 yards, 2:57; UTSA 41–14)
- (6:19) UIW – Chedon James 36-yard pass from EJ Colson, pass failed (Drive: 9 plays, 75 yards, 3:00; UTSA 41–20)
- (4:06) UTSA – Devin McCuin 24-yard pass from Owen McCown, Michael Petro kick (Drive: 4 plays, 46 yards, 2:11; UTSA 48–20)

Statistics	UIW	UTSA
First downs	23	22
Plays–yards	72–357	70–442
Rushes–yards	27–33	34–199
Passing yards	324	243
Passing: comp–att–int	31–45–2	29–35–0
Turnovers	4	0
Time of possession	25:48	34:12

Team	Category	Player	Statistics
Incarnate Word	Passing	EJ Colson	17/24, 213 yards, 3 TD
Incarnate Word	Rushing	Jaylon Spears	5 carries, 26 yards
Incarnate Word	Receiving	Chedon James	8 receptions, 134 yards, 3 TD
UTSA	Passing	Owen McCown	29/35, 238 yards, 4 TD
UTSA	Rushing	Robert Henry	14 carries, 144 yards, 2 TD
UTSA	Receiving	AJ Wilson	4 receptions, 99 yards, TD

=== @ No. 17 Northern Arizona ===
Uniform combination
Helmet	Jersey	Pants

Game Four – No. 19 Incarnate Word Cardinals (1–2) at No. 17 Northern Arizona Lumberjacks (2–1)

Quarter	1	2	3	4	Total
No. 19 Cardinals	0	10	6	7	23
No. 17 Lumberjacks	7	14	7	3	31

at Walkup Skydome, Flagstaff, AZ

- Date: September 20
- Game time: 3:00 p.m.
- Game weather: Indoors
- Game attendance: 10,007
- Referee: Mike Bezner
- TV announcers (ESPN+): Mitch Strohman (play-by-play) and Kevin Stephens (analyst)
- Box Score

Game information

First quarter

- NAU – 6:19 Ethen Cluff 4-yard run, Samuel Hunsaker kick. NAU 7–0 Drive: 10 plays, 77 yards, 5:32

Second quarter

- UIW – 14:49 Will Faris 37-yard field goal. NAU 7–3 Drive: 8 plays, 68 yards, 2:00
- UIW – 9:34 Jameson Garcia 47-yard pass from EJ Colson, Will Faris kick. UIW 10–7 Drive: 7 plays, 75 yards, 3:34
- NAU – 7:17 Jayson Raines 33-yard pass from Ty Pennington, Samuel Hunsaker kick. NAU 14–10 Drive: 5 plays, 75 yards, 2:17
- NAU – 0:00 Myseth Currie 46-yard pass from Ty Pennington, Samuel Hunsaker kick. NAU 21–10 Drive: 7 plays, 60 yards, 0:56

Third quarter

- UIW – 3:24 Lontrell Turner 3-yard run, PAT failed. NAU 21–16 Drive: 11 plays, 80 yards, 6:56
- NAU – 1:17 Jeter Purdy 30-yard pass from Ty Pennington, Samuel Hunsaker kick. NAU 28–16 Drive: 5 plays, 78 yards, 2:01

Fourth quarter

- UIW – 11:02 Jameson Garcia 11-yard pass from EJ Colson, Will Faris kick. NAU 28–23 Drive: 10 plays, 77 yards, 5:32
- NAU – 5:13 Samuel Hunsaker 50-yard field goal. NAU 31–23 Drive: 11 plays, 43 yards, 5:49

Statistics	UIW	NAU
First downs	22	19
Plays–yards	66–436	63–402
Rushes–yards	28–144	29–116
Passing yards	292	286
Passing: Comp–Att–Int	30–38–0	17–34–0
Turnovers	0	0
Time of possession	31:43	28:17

Team	Category	Player	Statistics
Incarnate Word	Passing	EJ Colson	28/36, 292 yards, 2 TD
Incarnate Word	Rushing	EJ Colson	13 carries, 59 yards
Incarnate Word	Receiving	Jameson Garcia	9 receptions, 116 yards, 2 TD
Northern Arizona	Passing	Ty Pennington	17/34, 286 yards, 3 TD
Northern Arizona	Rushing	Seth Cromwell	16 carries, 63 yards
Northern Arizona	Receiving	Kolbe Katsis	4 receptions, 95 yards

=== No. 12 Abilene Christian ===
Uniform combination
Helmet	Jersey	Pants

Game Five – No. 12 Abilene Christian Wildcats (2–2) at Incarnate Word Cardinals (1–3)

Quarter	1	2	3	4	Total
No. 12 Wildcats	7	0	0	0	7
Cardinals	7	10	14	7	38

at Gayle and Tom Benson Stadium, San Antonio, TX

- Date: September 27
- Game time: 6:00 p.m.
- Game weather: Temperature: 91 • Wind: NE 8 mph • Weather: Sunny
- Game attendance: 3,006
- Referee: Gary Leeper
- TV announcers (ESPN+): Karl Schoening (play-by-play) & Sam Kaman (analyst)
- Box Score

Game information

First Quarter

- ACU – 11:10 Dallas Dudley 21 yard pass from Stone Earle, Brandon Perez kick
  UIW 7–0 Drive: 3 plays, 88 yards, 1:09
- UIW – 4:05 Jalen Walthall 4 yard pass from EJ Colson, Will Faris kick
  Tied 7–7 Drive: 15 plays, 75 yards, 7:05

Second Quarter

- UIW – 13:45 Will Faris 32 yard field goal
  UIW 10–7 Drive: 10 plays, 61 yards, 4:12
- UIW – 6:37 EJ Colson 1 yard run, Will Faris kick
  UIW 17–7 Drive: 12 plays, 52 yards, 5:26

Third Quarter

- UIW – 4:55 EJ Colson 3 yard run, Will Faris kick
  UIW 24–7 Drive: 16 plays, 76 yards, 6:49
- UIW – 4:48 Declan Williams 28 yard interception return
  UIW 31–7

Fourth Quarter

- UIW – 1:10 Jaylon Spears 11 yard run, Will Faris kick
  UIW 38–7 Drive: 9 plays, 79 yards, 5:20

Statistics	ACU	UIW
First downs	16	28
Total yards	248	423
Rushing yards	107	301
Passing yards	141	122
Passing: Comp–Att–Int	17–30–2	17–30–0
Time of possession	19:44	40:16

Team	Category	Player	Statistics
Abilene Christian	Passing	Stone Earle	17/30, 141 yards, 1 TD, 2 INT
Abilene Christian	Rushing	Rovaughn Banks Jr.	14 carries, 110 yards
Abilene Christian	Receiving	Javon Gipson	5 receptions, 53 yards
Incarnate Word	Passing	EJ Colson	17/30, 122 yards, 1 TD
Incarnate Word	Rushing	Lontrell Turner	20 carries, 118 yards
Incarnate Word	Receiving	Chedon James	5 receptions, 43 yards

=== Stephen F. Austin ===
Uniform combination
Helmet	Jersey	Pants

Game Six – Stephen F. Austin Lumberjacks (3–2) at Incarnate Word Cardinals (2–3)

Quarter	1	2	3	4	Total
Lumberjacks	14	10	7	0	31
Cardinals	3	3	0	11	17

at Gayle and Tom Benson Stadium, San Antonio, TX

- Date: October 4
- Game time: 6:00 p.m.
- Game weather: Temperature: 89 • Wind: E 9 mph • Weather: Clear
- Game attendance: 2,098
- Referee: Craig Hesler
- TV announcers (ESPN+): Karl Schoening (play-by-play) & Sam Kaman (analyst)
- Box Score

Game information

First Quarter

- SFA – 13:06 Kylon Harris 20 yard pass from Sam Vidlak, Carlos Alvarado kick
  SFA 7–0 Drive: 4 plays, 38 yards, 1:26
- SFA – 7:59 Derrick Bohler 37 yard pass from Sam Vidlak, Carlos Alvarado kick
  SFA 14–0 Drive: 1 play, 37 yards, 0:07
- UIW – 1:30 Will Faris 36 yard field goal
  SFA 14–3 Drive: 13 plays, 57 yards, 6:29

Second Quarter

- SFA – 11:33 Carlos Alvarado 30 yard field goal
  SFA 17–3 Drive: 14 plays, 63 yards, 4:57
- SFA – 6:06 Isaiah Davis 45 yard pass from Sam Vidlak, Carlos Alvarado kick
  SFA 24–3 Drive: 3 plays, 49 yards, 0:59
- UIW – 1:27 Will Faris 34 yard field goal
  SFA 24–6 Drive: 12 plays, 41 yards, 4:34

Third Quarter

- SFA – 3:06 Jerrell Wimbley 1 yard run, Carlos Alvarado kick
  SFA 31–6 Drive: 7 plays, 87 yards, 3:26

Fourth Quarter

- UIW – 14:09 Will Faris 37 yard field goal
  SFA 31–9 Drive: 9 plays, 56 yards, 3:57
- UIW – 1:18 Josh Lorick 16 yard pass from EJ Colson, Jaylon Spears pass
  SFA 31–17 Drive: 8 plays, 55 yards, 2:23

Statistics	SFA	UIW
First downs	15	21
Total yards	335	345
Rushing yards	74	39
Passing yards	261	306
Passing: Comp–Att–Int	19–27–0	35–46–1
Time of possession	25:01	34:59

Team	Category	Player	Statistics
Stephen F. Austin	Passing	Sam Vidlak	19/26, 261 yards, 3 TD
Stephen F. Austin	Rushing	Jerrell Wimbley	21 carries, 69 yards, 1 TD
Stephen F. Austin	Receiving	Clayton Wayland	6 receptions, 100 yards
Incarnate Word	Passing	EJ Colson	35/46, 306 yards, 1 TD, 1 INT
Incarnate Word	Rushing	Jaylon Spears	10 carries, 33 yards
Incarnate Word	Receiving	Jameson Garcia	4 receptions, 70 yards

=== East Texas A&M ===
Game Seven – East Texas A&M Lions (1–5) at Incarnate Word Cardinals (2–4)

Quarter	1	2	3	4	Total
Lions	7	14	14	17	52
Cardinals	21	14	7	3	45

at Gayle and Tom Benson Stadium, San Antonio, TX

- Date: October 18
- Game time: 4:30 p.m.
- Game weather: Sunny, 94 °F (34 °C)
- Game attendance: 2,016
- Referee: James Brookhart
- TV announcers (ESPN+): Karl Schoening (play-by-play) & Sam Kaman (analyst)
- Box Score

Game information

First Quarter

- UIW – Jaylon Spears 9-yard run (Will Faris kick), 12:16. Cardinals 7–0. Drive: 9 plays, 67 yards, 2:34.
- ETAM – Paul Odidi 37-yard pass from Ron Peace (Ozlo Rigby kick), 10:55. Tied 7–7. Drive: 4 plays, 75 yards, 1:21.
- UIW – Jaylon Spears 10-yard run (Will Faris kick), 3:18. Cardinals 14–7. Drive: 11 plays, 68 yards, 4:29.
- UIW – Jalen Walthall 27-yard pass from E. J. Colson (Will Faris kick), 1:15. Cardinals 21–7. Drive: 2 plays, 33 yards, 0:28.

Second Quarter

- UIW – Austin Samaha 1-yard run (Will Faris kick), 14:56. Cardinals 28–7. Drive: 3 plays, 22 yards, 0:37.
- ETAM – E. J. Oakmon 1-yard run (Ozlo Rigby kick), 9:58. Cardinals 28–14. Drive: 13 plays, 75 yards, 4:58.
- ETAM – Devin Matthews 39-yard pass from Ron Peace (Ozlo Rigby kick), 4:20. Cardinals 28–21. Drive: 8 plays, 61 yards, 2:35.
- UIW – Jaylon Spears 11-yard run (Will Faris kick), 0:27. Cardinals 35–21. Drive: 5 plays, 66 yards, 1:13.

Third Quarter

- ETAM – Paul Odidi 6-yard pass from Eric Rodriguez (Ozlo Rigby kick), 8:44. Cardinals 35–28. Drive: 6 plays, 74 yards, 3:04.
- UIW – Josh Lorick 25-yard pass from E. J. Colson (Will Faris kick), 3:13. Cardinals 42–28. Drive: 3 plays, 18 yards, 1:38.
- ETAM – Eric Rodriguez 8-yard run (Ozlo Rigby kick), 1:02. Cardinals 42–35. Drive: 6 plays, 75 yards, 2:11.

Fourth Quarter

- ETAM – Devin Matthews 17-yard pass from Eric Rodriguez (Ozlo Rigby kick), 12:55. Tied 42–42. Drive: 8 plays, 58 yards, 2:10.
- ETAM – Ozlo Rigby 36-yard field goal, 6:45. Lions 45–42. Drive: 10 plays, 64 yards, 4:56.
- UIW – Will Faris 57-yard field goal, 1:55. Tied 45–45. Drive: 12 plays, 36 yards, 4:50.
- ETAM – E. J. Oakmon 24-yard run (Ozlo Rigby kick), 0:27. Lions 52–45. Drive: 9 plays, 75 yards, 1:28.

Statistics	ETAM	UIW
First downs	27	26
Total yards	526	492
Rushing yards	141	217
Passing yards	385	275
Passing: Comp–Att–Int	29–45–0	24–34–2
Time of possession	29:30	30:30

Team	Category	Player	Statistics
East Texas A&M	Passing	Eric Rodriguez	16/21, 193 yards, 2 TD
East Texas A&M	Rushing	E. J. Oakmon	8 carries, 45 yards, TD
East Texas A&M	Receiving	Paul Odidi	9 receptions, 112 yards, TD
Incarnate Word	Passing	E. J. Colson	24/34, 275 yards, 2 TD, 2 INT
Incarnate Word	Rushing	Jaylon Spears	18 carries, 85 yards, 3 TD
Incarnate Word	Receiving	Jalen Walthall	9 receptions, 96 yards, TD

=== @ UT Rio Grande Valley ===
Game Eight – Incarnate Word Cardinals (2–5) at UT Rio Grande Valley Vaqueros (5–2)

Quarter	1	2	3	4	Total
Cardinals	0	0	21	7	28
Vaqueros	14	21	7	14	56

at Robert and Janet Vackar Stadium, Edinburg, TX

- Date: October 25
- Game time: 7:00 p.m.
- Game weather: Sunny, 90 °F (32 °C)
- Game attendance: 12,649
- Referee: Brian Bortness
- TV announcers (ESPN+): Mark May (play-by-play), Aaron Saenz (analyst) and Jaeda Rael (sideline)
- Box Score

Game information

First Quarter

- RGV – Ismael Smith Flores 25-yard pass from Eddie Lee Marburger (Brysen Gardner kick), 13:01. Vaqueros 7–0. Drive: 7 plays, 75 yards, 1:59.
- RGV – Ismael Smith Flores 43-yard pass from Eddie Lee Marburger (Brysen Gardner kick), 2:51. Vaqueros 14–0. Drive: 2 plays, 54 yards, 0:42.

Second Quarter

- RGV – Nathan Denney 42-yard pass from Eddie Lee Marburger (Brysen Gardner kick), 14:14. Vaqueros 21–0. Drive: 6 plays, 66 yards, 2:00.
- RGV – Eddie Lee Marburger 12-yard run (Brysen Gardner kick), 10:44. Vaqueros 28–0. Drive: 5 plays, 78 yards, 1:53.
- RGV – Xayvion Noland 22-yard pass from Eddie Lee Marburger (Brysen Gardner kick), 1:46. Vaqueros 35–0. Drive: 6 plays, 48 yards, 0:52.

Third Quarter

- UIW – Jalen Walthall 69-yard pass from EJ Colson (Will Faris kick), 14:31. Vaqueros 35–7. Drive: 3 plays, 75 yards, 0:29.
- UIW – EJ Colson 22-yard run (Will Faris kick), 9:14. Vaqueros 35–14. Drive: 9 plays, 79 yards, 2:50.
- UIW – Harlan Dixon 2-yard run (Will Faris kick), 5:03. Vaqueros 35–21. Drive: 8 plays, 79 yards, 2:38.
- RGV – Tony Diaz 3-yard pass from Eddie Lee Marburger (Brysen Gardner kick), 1:09. Vaqueros 42–21. Drive: 10 plays, 99 yards, 3:47.

Fourth Quarter

- UIW – Jalen Walthall 39-yard pass from EJ Colson (Will Faris kick), 13:44. Vaqueros 42–28. Drive: 13 plays, 75 yards, 2:25.
- RGV – Xayvion Noland 75-yard pass from Eddie Lee Marburger (Brysen Gardner kick), 13:27. Vaqueros 49–28. Drive: 3 plays, 75 yards, 0:17.
- RGV – Jayden House 35-yard fumble return (Brysen Gardner kick), 10:33. Vaqueros 56–28.

Statistics	UIW	RGV
First downs	21	23
Total yards	440	548
Rushing yards	101	108
Passing yards	339	440
Passing: Comp–Att–Int	29–45–1	27–37–0
Time of possession	31:34	28:26

Team	Category	Player	Statistics
Incarnate Word	Passing	EJ Colson	29/45, 339 yards, 2 TD, INT
Incarnate Word	Rushing	EJ Colson	13 carries, 36 yards, TD
Incarnate Word	Receiving	Jalen Walthall	10 receptions, 220 yards, 2 TD
UT Rio Grande Valley	Passing	Eddie Lee Marburger	26/36, 440 yards, 6 TD
UT Rio Grande Valley	Rushing	Nathan Denney	13 carries, 64 yards
UT Rio Grande Valley	Receiving	Tony Diaz	17 receptions, 172 yards, TD

=== No. 14 Lamar ===
Game Nine – No. 14 Lamar Cardinals (7–1) at Incarnate Word Cardinals (2–6)

Quarter	1	2	3	4	Total
No. 14 Cardinals (LU)	-	-	-	-	0
Cardinals (UIW)	-	-	-	-	0

at Gayle and Tom Benson Stadium, San Antonio, TX

- Date: November 1
- Game time: 2:00 p.m.
- TV: ESPN+

Game information

First Quarter
Second Quarter
Third Quarter
Fourth Quarter

Statistics	LAM	UIW
First downs		
Total yards		
Rushing yards		
Passing yards		
Passing: Comp–Att–Int		
Time of possession		

Team	Category	Player	Statistics
Lamar	Passing		
Lamar	Rushing		
Lamar	Receiving		
Incarnate Word	Passing		
Incarnate Word	Rushing		
Incarnate Word	Receiving		

=== @ Northwestern State ===
Game Ten – Incarnate Word Cardinals (3–6) at Northwestern State Demons (1–8)

Quarter	1	2	3	4	Total
Cardinals	-	-	-	-	0
Demons	-	-	-	-	0

at Harry Turpin Stadium, Natchitoches, LA

- Date: November 8
- Game time: 1:00 p.m.
- TV: ESPN+

Game information

First Quarter
Second Quarter
Third Quarter
Fourth Quarter

Statistics	UIW	NWST
First downs		
Total yards		
Rushing yards		
Passing yards		
Passing: Comp–Att–Int		
Time of possession		

Team	Category	Player	Statistics
Incarnate Word	Passing		
Incarnate Word	Rushing		
Incarnate Word	Receiving		
Northwestern State	Passing		
Northwestern State	Rushing		
Northwestern State	Receiving		

=== No. 23 Southeastern Louisiana ===
Game Eleven – No. 23 Southeastern Louisiana Lions (7–3) at Incarnate Word Cardinals (4–6)

Quarter	1	2	3	4	Total
No. 23 Lions	-	-	-	-	0
Cardinals	-	-	-	-	0

at Gayle and Tom Benson Stadium, San Antonio, TX

- Date: November 15
- Game time: 2:00 p.m.
- TV: ESPN+

Game information

First Quarter
Second Quarter
Third Quarter
Fourth Quarter

Statistics	SELA	UIW
First downs		
Total yards		
Rushing yards		
Passing yards		
Passing: Comp–Att–Int		
Time of possession		

Team	Category	Player	Statistics
Southeastern Louisiana	Passing		
Southeastern Louisiana	Rushing		
Southeastern Louisiana	Receiving		
Incarnate Word	Passing		
Incarnate Word	Rushing		
Incarnate Word	Receiving		

=== @ Houston Christian ===
Game Twelve – Incarnate Word Cardinals (0–0) at Houston Christian Huskies (0–0)

Quarter	1	2	3	4	Total
Cardinals	-	-	-	-	0
Huskies	-	-	-	-	0

at Husky Stadium, Houston, TX

- Date: November 22
- Game time: 2:00 p.m.
- TV: ESPN+

Game information

First Quarter
Second Quarter
Third Quarter
Fourth Quarter

Statistics	UIW	HCU
First downs		
Total yards		
Rushing yards		
Passing yards		
Passing: Comp–Att–Int		
Time of possession		

Team	Category	Player	Statistics
Incarnate Word	Passing		
Incarnate Word	Rushing		
Incarnate Word	Receiving		
Houston Christian	Passing		
Houston Christian	Rushing		
Houston Christian	Receiving		

== Rankings ==
Ranking movements Legend: ██ Increase in ranking ██ Decrease in ranking — = Not ranked RV = Received votes
	Week													
Poll	Pre	1	2	3	4	5	6	7	8	9	10	11	12	Final
STATS FCS	5	12	14	19	RV	RV	—							
Coaches	4	9	8	14	24	20	RV							
