= 2025 UT Rio Grande Valley Vaqueros football team =

American college football season

2025 UT Rio Grande Valley Vaqueros football
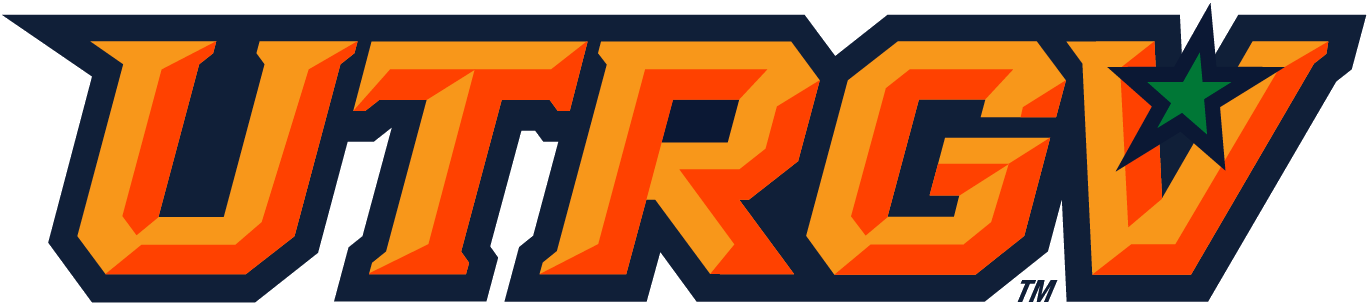
- Conference: Southland Conference
- Record: 9–3 (5–3 SLC)
- Head coach: Travis Bush (1st season)
- Offensive coordinator: Jeff Bowen (1st season)
- Offensive scheme: Spread
- Defensive coordinator: Brian Gamble (1st season)
- Base defense: 4–2–5
- Home stadium: Robert and Janet Vackar Stadium

2025 Southland Conference football standings
	Conf.			Overall
Team	W		L	W		L
No. 7 Stephen F. Austin $^	8	–	0	11	–	3
No. 19 Southeastern Louisiana ^	7	–	1	9	–	4
No. 24 Lamar ^	5	–	3	8	–	5
UT Rio Grande Valley	5	–	3	9	–	3
Nicholls	4	–	4	4	–	8
McNeese	4	–	4	5	–	7
East Texas A&M	3	–	5	3	–	9
Incarnate Word	3	–	5	5	–	7
Houston Christian	1	–	7	2	–	10
Northwestern State	0	–	8	1	–	11
$ – Conference champion; ^ – FCS playoff participant; Rankings from STATS Poll

The 2025 UT Rio Grande Valley Vaqueros football team represented the University of Texas Rio Grande Valley (UTRGV) as a member of the Southland Conference (SLC) in the 2025 NCAA Division I FCS football season. The 2025 season was the inaugural season for UTRGV football. The Vaqueros were led by first-year head coach Travis Bush, and played their home games at Robert and Janet Vackar Stadium in Edinburg, Texas.

The Vaqueros were considered full FCS members and were eligible for postseason play immediately.

The UTRGV Vaqueros drew an average home attendance of 12,539, the 16th-highest of all NCAA Division I FCS football teams.

== Schedule ==
Date	Time	Opponent	Site	TV	Result	Attendance
August 30	7:00 p.m.	Sul Ross*	Robert and Janet Vackar Stadium; Edinburg, TX	ESPN+	W 66–0	12,726
September 6	6:00 pm	at Prairie View A&M*	Panther Stadium at Blackshear Field; Prairie View, TX	SWAC TV	W 27–21	6,326
September 13	7:00 p.m.	Langston*	Robert and Janet Vackar Stadium; Edinburg, TX	ESPN+	W 80–0	12,552
September 20	7:00 p.m.	Texas Wesleyan*	Robert and Janet Vackar Stadium; Edinburg, TX	ESPN+	W 61–13	12,447
September 27	6:00 pm	at Southeastern Louisiana	Strawberry Stadium; Hammond, LA	ESPN+	L 31–45	4,154
October 4	7:00 p.m.	Houston Christian	Robert and Janet Vackar Stadium; Edinburg, TX	ESPN+	W 27–7	12,903
October 18	3:00 pm	at No. 17 Lamar	Provost Umphrey Stadium; Beaumont, TX	ESPN+	L 21–23	8,283
October 25	7:00 p.m.	Incarnate Word^{†}	Robert and Janet Vackar Stadium; Edinburg, TX	ESPN+	W 56–28	12,649
November 1	6:00 p.m.	at No. 20 Stephen F. Austin	Homer Bryce Stadium; Nacogdoches, TX	ESPN+	L 17–41	6,769
November 8	5:00 p.m.	Nicholls	Robert and Janet Vackar Stadium; Edinburg, TX	ESPN+	W 28–21	12,117
November 15	6:00 p.m.	at McNeese	Cowboy Stadium; Lake Charles, LA	ESPN+	W 28–13	9,929
November 22	5:00 p.m.	East Texas A&M	Robert and Janet Vackar Stadium; Edinburg, TX	ESPN+	W 33–14	12,320
*Non-conference game; ^{†}Homecoming; Rankings from STATS Poll released prior to the game; All times are in Central time

== Game summaries ==
=== Sul Ross ===
Sul Ross Lobos (0-0) at UT Rio Grande Valley Vaqueros (0-0) – Game summary

Quarter	1	2	3	4	Total
Lobos	0	0	0	0	0
Vaqueros	28	21	14	3	66

at Robert and Janet Vackar Stadium, Edinburg, Texas

- Date: August 30
- Game time: 7:00 p.m. CDT
- Game weather: Sunny
- Game attendance: 12,726
- Referee: James Brookhart
- TV announcers (ESPN+): Mark May (play-by-play), Aaron Saenz (analyst) and Jaeda Rael (sideline)
- Box score, Recap

Game information
First quarter
- UTRGV – Xayvion Noland 50-yard pass from Eddie Lee Marburger (Brysen Gardner kick), 11:36. Vaqueros 7–0. Drive: 4 plays, 61 yards, 1:02.
- UTRGV – Ismael Smith Flores 6-yard pass from Eddie Lee Marburger (Brysen Gardner kick), 7:47. Vaqueros 14–0. Drive: 5 plays, 43 yards, 1:53.
- UTRGV – Tony Diaz 3-yard pass from Eddie Lee Marburger (Brysen Gardner kick), 4:36. Vaqueros 21–0. Drive: 2 plays, 51 yards, 0:52.
- UTRGV – Djouvensky Schlenbaker 1-yard run (Brysen Gardner kick), 3:06. Vaqueros 28–0. Drive: 2 plays, 53 yards, 0:45.

Second quarter

- UTRGV – Xayvion Noland 76-yard pass from Eddie Lee Marburger (Brysen Gardner kick), 12:56. Vaqueros 35–0. Drive: 4 plays, 90 yards, 1:10.
- UTRGV – T. J. Dement 1-yard run (Troop O'Neal kick), 5:15. Vaqueros 42–0. Drive: 12 plays, 74 yards, 5:15.
- UTRGV – Tavian Cord 61-yard pass from Eddie Lee Marburger (J. J. Contreas kick), 0:43. Vaqueros 49–0. Drive: 4 plays, 95 yards, 1:04.

Third quarter

- UTRGV – T. J. Dement 2-yard run (Troop O'Neal kick), 10:13. Vaqueros 56–0. Drive: 9 plays, 67 yards, 4:47.
- UTRGV – Fabian Garcia 6-yard run (J. J. Contreas kick), 2:44. Vaqueros 63–0. Drive: 7 plays, 80 yards, 4:21.

Fourth quarter

- UTRGV – Brysen Gardner 30-yard field goal, 10:27. Vaqueros 66–0. Drive: 8 plays, 38 yards, 4:54.

Statistics	SROS	RGV
First downs	6	29
Total yards	74	674
Rushing yards	33	236
Passing yards	41	438
Turnovers	0	0
Time of possession	29:23	30:37

Team	Category	Player	Statistics
Sul Ross	Passing	Andrew Martinez	9/12, 41 yards
Sul Ross	Rushing	Jose Travino	7 carries, 28 yards
Sul Ross	Receiving	Landon Drake	3 receptions, 15 yards
UT Rio Grande Valley	Passing	Eddie Lee Marburger	18/19, 365 yards, 5 TD
UT Rio Grande Valley	Rushing	Xayvion Noland	1 carry, 51 yards
UT Rio Grande Valley	Receiving	Xayvion Noland	2 receptions, 126 yards, 2 TD

=== At Prairie View A&M ===
UT Rio Grande Valley Vaqueros (1-0) at Prairie View A&M Panthers (1-0) – Game summary

Quarter	1	2	3	4	Total
Vaqueros	17	3	0	7	27
Panthers	0	7	7	7	21

at Panther Stadium at Blackshear Field, Prairie View, Texas

- Date: September 6
- Game time: 6:00 p.m. CDT
- Game weather: Cloudy
- Game attendance: 6,326
- Referee: Nathan Pinkard
- TV announcers (SWAC TV): Butch Alsandor (play by play) and Jorge Vargas (analyst)
- Box score, Recap

Game information
First quarter
- RGV – Tony Diaz 16-yard pass from Eddie Lee Marburger (Brysen Gardner kick), 10:50. Vaqueros 7–0. Drive: 14 plays, 69 yards, 4:10.
- RGV – Brysen Gardner 49-yard field goal, 6:26. Vaqueros 10–0. Drive: 4 plays, 40 yards, 2:22.
- RGV – TJ Dement 21-yard run (Brysen Gardner kick), 2:04. Vaqueros 17–0. Drive: 6 plays, 69 yards, 3:06.

Second quarter

- PV – Cameron Peters 1-yard run (Aiden Webb kick), 6:03. Vaqueros 17–7. Drive: 9 plays, 40 yards, 3:46.
- RGV – Brysen Gardner 40-yard field goal, 4:07. Vaqueros 20–7. Drive: 7 plays, 73 yards, 1:53.

Third quarter

- PV – Tevin Carter 1-yard run (Aiden Webb kick), 8:04. Vaqueros 20–14. Drive: 8 plays, 56 yards, 3:16.

Fourth quarter

- PV – Tevin Carter 3-yard run (Aiden Webb kick), 13:00. Panthers 21–20. Drive: 20 plays, 93 yards, 7:47.
- RGV – Nathan Denney 7-yard run (Brysen Gardner kick), 2:21. Vaqueros 27–21. Drive: 8 plays, 71 yards, 3:04.

Statistics	RGV	PV
First downs	24	15
Total yards	409	301
Rushing yards	146	164
Passing yards	263	137
Turnovers	0	1
Time of possession	28:41	31:19

Team	Category	Player	Statistics
UT Rio Grande Valley	Passing	Eddie Lee Marburger	19/31, 263 yards, TD
UT Rio Grande Valley	Rushing	Nathan Denny	23 carries, 101 yards, TD
UT Rio Grande Valley	Receiving	Tony Diaz	6 receptions, 121 yards, TD
Prairie View A&M	Passing	Cameron Peters	8/16, 64 yards
Prairie View A&M	Rushing	Chase Bingmon	16 carries, 88 yards
Prairie View A&M	Receiving	Jyzaiah Rockwell	7 receptions, 98 yards

=== Langston ===
Langston Lions (0–2) at UT Rio Grande Valley Vaqueros (2–0) – Game summary

Quarter	1	2	3	4	Total
Lions	0	0	0	0	0
Vaqueros	21	31	21	7	80

at Robert and Janet Vackar Stadium, Edinburg, Texas

- Date: September 13
- Game time: 7:00 p.m. CDT
- Game weather: Sunny, 88 °F (31 °C)
- Game attendance: 12,552
- Referee: Austin Mezzacasa
- TV announcers (ESPN+): Mark May (play-by-play), Aaron Saenz (analyst) and Jaeda Rael (sideline)
- Box score, Recap

Game information
First quarter
- RGV – Xayvion Noland 42-yard pass from Eddie Lee Marburger (Brysen Gardner kick), 10:50. Vaqueros 7–0. Drive: 3 plays, 75 yards, 1:06.
- RGV – Tyler Day 70-yard run (Troop O'Neal kick), 1:58. Vaqueros 14–0. Drive: 4 plays, 73 yards, 1:25.
- RGV – Elijah Graham 26-yard interception return (JJ Contreras kick), 1:06. Vaqueros 21–0.

Second quarter

- RGV – Brysen Gardner 38-yard field goal, 12:47. Vaqueros 24–0. Drive: 7 plays, 37 yards, 2:47.
- RGV – Tony Diaz 35-yard pass from Eddie Lee Marburger (Troop O'Neal kick), 10:46. Vaqueros 31–0. Drive: 3 plays, 42 yards, 0:53.
- RGV – TJ Dement 14-yard run (JJ Contreras kick), 8:11. Vaqueros 38–0. Drive: 7 plays, 58 yards, 1:46.
- RGV – Xayvion Noland 70-yard pass from Eddie Lee Marburger (Brysen Gardner kick), 1:41. Vaqueros 45–0. Drive: 7 plays, 81 yards, 1:50.
- RGV – Fabian Garcia 21-yard run (Troop O'Neal kick), 0:46. Vaqueros 52–0. Drive: 1 play, 21 yards, 0:06.

Third quarter

- RGV – Cameron Glenn 7-yard pass from Aidan Jakobsohn (JJ Contreras kick), 12:46. Vaqueros 59–0. Drive: 4 plays, 56 yards, 2:07.
- RGV – Djouvensky Schlenbaker 63-yard run (Brysen Gardner kick), 11:03. Vaqueros 66–0. Drive: 3 plays, 63 yards, 0:17.
- RGV – Javien Cuff 15-yard pass from Aidan Jakobsohn (Troop O'Neal kick), 7:12. Vaqueros 73–0. Drive: 4 plays, 66 yards, 1:39.

Fourth quarter

- RGV – Broderick Taylor 33-yard run (JJ Contreras kick), 13:17. Vaqueros 80–0. Drive: 8 plays, 94 yards, 4:08.

Statistics	LAN	RGV
First downs	11	27
Total yards	179	751
Rushing yards	59	462
Passing yards	120	289
Turnovers	3	0
Time of possession	30:29	29:31

Team	Category	Player	Statistics
Langston	Passing	Aden Hooper	13/32, 109 yards, INT
Langston	Rushing	Charles Carter	12 carries, 18 yards
Langston	Receiving	Gerald Martin	7 receptions, 79 yards
UT Rio Grande Valley	Passing	Eddie Lee Marburger	12/19, 225 yards, 3 TD
UT Rio Grande Valley	Rushing	Brennan Carroll	7 carries, 134 yards
UT Rio Grande Valley	Receiving	Xayvion Noland	5 receptions, 171 yards, 2 TD

=== Texas Wesleyan ===
Texas Wesleyan Rams (1–1) at UT Rio Grande Valley Vaqueros (3–0) – Game summary

Quarter	1	2	3	4	Total
Rams	0	0	7	6	13
Vaqueros	14	26	7	14	61

at Robert and Janet Vackar Stadium, Edinburg, Texas

- Date: September 20
- Game time: 7:00 p.m. CDT
- Game weather: Clear
- Game attendance: 12,447
- Referee: Gary Leeper
- TV announcers (ESPN+): Mark May (play-by-play), Aaron Saenz (analyst) and Jaeda Rael (sideline)
- Box score, Recap

Game information

First quarter

- (8:15) RGV – Djouvensky Schlenbaker 2-yard run, Brysen Gardner kick (Drive: 6 plays, 60 yards, 2:04; UT Rio Grande Valley 7–0)
- (4:45) RGV – TJ Dement 12-yard run, Brysen Gardner kick (Drive: 3 plays, 64 yards, 1:08; UT Rio Grande Valley 14–0)

Second quarter

- (14:18) RGV – Tony Diaz 5-yard pass from Eddie Lee Marburger, Brysen Gardner kick (Drive: 5 plays, 37 yards, 1:41; UT Rio Grande Valley 21–0)
- (5:28) RGV – Brennan Carroll 1-yard run, Brysen Gardner kick (Drive: 10 plays, 66 yards, 4:08; UT Rio Grande Valley 28–0)
- (5:13) RGV – Alijah Prosser 52-yard interception, Brysen Gardner kick (UT Rio Grande Valley 35–0)
- (1:41) RGV – Brysen Gardner 31-yard field goal (Drive: 6 plays, 20 yards, 1:34; UT Rio Grande Valley 38–0)
- (1:09) RGV – Jackson Waid 0-yard safety (UT Rio Grande Valley 40–0)

Third quarter

- (13:04) RGV – Eddie Lee Marburger 32-yard run, Brysen Gardner kick (Drive: 3 plays, 40 yards, 0:49; UT Rio Grande Valley 47–0)
- (2:04) TXWESL – Jaiden Jones 65-yard interception, Freddy Joya kick (UT Rio Grande Valley 47–7)

Fourth quarter

- (14:50) TXWESL – Ashton Mitchell-Johnson 1-yard run (Drive: 4 plays, 70 yards, 0:48; UT Rio Grande Valley 47–13)
- (12:18) RGV – Fabian Garcia 5-yard run, Troop O'Neal kick (Drive: 5 plays, 33 yards, 2:25; UT Rio Grande Valley 54–13)
- (3:08) RGV – Broderick Taylor 78-yard run, Troop O'Neal kick (Drive: 2 plays, 80 yards, 0:52; UT Rio Grande Valley 61–13)

Statistics	TXWESL	RGV
First downs	16	21
Total yards	325	530
Rushing yards	38	283
Passing yards	287	247
Turnovers	5	1
Time of possession	30:44	29:16

Team	Category	Player	Statistics
Texas Wesleyan	Passing	Cole Francis	15/31, 217 yards, 2 INT
Texas Wesleyan	Rushing	Jalen March	11 carries, 35 yards
Texas Wesleyan	Receiving	Paul Summers	7 receptions, 137 yards
UT Rio Grande Valley	Passing	Eddie Lee Marburger	17/23, 223 yards, TD
UT Rio Grande Valley	Rushing	Broderick Taylor	2 carries, 80 yards, TD
UT Rio Grande Valley	Receiving	Xayvion Noland	5 receptions, 103 yards

=== At Southeastern Louisiana ===
UT Rio Grande Valley Vaqueros (4–0) at Southeastern Louisiana Lions (2–2) – Game summary

Quarter	1	2	3	4	Total
Vaqueros	0	10	7	14	31
Lions	7	21	14	3	45

at Strawberry Stadium, Hammond, Louisiana

- Date: September 27
- Game time: 6:00 p.m. CDT
- Game weather: Sunny, 85 °F (29 °C)
- Game attendance: 4,154
- Referee: Austin Mezzacasa
- TV announcers (ESPN+): Logan Loving (play-by-play) and Jules Dormain (analyst)
- Box score, Recap

Game information
First quarter
- SELA – Kyle Lowe 38-yard run (Guillermo Garcia Rodriguez kick), 10:20. Lions 7–0. Drive: 10 plays, 99 yards, 4:30.

Second quarter

- SELA – Adyn Wilkinson 29-yard pass from Kyle Lowe (Guillermo Garcia Rodriguez kick), 11:37. Lions 14–0. Drive: 14 plays, 91 yards, 7:48.
- SELA – Jaedon Henry 1-yard run (Guillermo Garcia Rodriguez kick), 7:13. Lions 21–0. Drive: 8 plays, 43 yards, 2:35.
- RGV – Kyran Lee 3-yard pass from Eddie Lee Marburger (Brysen Gardner kick), 5:47. Lions 21–7. Drive: 5 plays, 75 yards, 1:26.
- SELA – Jaylon Domingeaux 26-yard pass from Carson Camp (Guillermo Garcia Rodriguez kick), 0:36. Lions 28–7. Drive: 2 plays, 45 yards, 0:21.
- RGV – Brysen Gardner 26-yard field goal, 0:00. Lions 28–10. Drive: 9 plays, 66 yards, 0:36.

Third quarter

- RGV – Tony Diaz 71-yard pass from Eddie Lee Marburger (Brysen Gardner kick), 11:46. Lions 28–17. Drive: 1 play, 71 yards, 0:10.
- SELA – Deantre Jackson 66-yard run (Guillermo Garcia Rodriguez kick), 10:45. Lions 35–17. Drive: 5 plays, 98 yards, 1:01.
- SELA – Kentrell Prejean 29-yard pass from Carson Camp (Guillermo Garcia Rodriguez kick), 3:10. Lions 42–17. Drive: 9 plays, 80 yards, 4:33.

Fourth quarter

- RGV – Ismael Smith Flores 18-yard pass from Eddie Lee Marburger (Brysen Gardner kick), 13:14. Lions 42–24. Drive: 1 play, 18 yards, 0:07.
- SELA – Guillermo Garcia Rodriguez 29-yard field goal, 8:39. Lions 45–24. Drive: 8 plays, 85 yards, 4:29.
- RGV – Aidan Jakobsohn 6-yard run (Brysen Gardner kick), 1:00. Lions 45–31. Drive: 8 plays, 53 yards, 3:36.

Statistics	RGV	SELA
First downs	19	24
Total yards	457	540
Rushing yards	217	288
Passing yards	240	252
Turnovers	1	1
Time of possession	26:43	33:17

Team	Category	Player	Statistics
UT Rio Grande Valley	Passing	Eddie Lee Marburger	16/29, 218 yards, 3 TD, INT
UT Rio Grande Valley	Rushing	Nathan Denney	7 carries, 56 yards
UT Rio Grande Valley	Receiving	Tony Diaz	4 receptions, 113 yards, TD
Southeastern Louisiana	Passing	Carson Camp	10/13, 130 yards, 2 TD
Southeastern Louisiana	Rushing	Deantre Jackson	13 carries, 121 yards, TD
Southeastern Louisiana	Receiving	Jaylon Domingeaux	7 receptions, 107 yards, TD

=== Houston Christian ===
Houston Christian Huskies (1–3) at UT Rio Grande Valley Vaqueros (4–1) – Game summary

Quarter	1	2	3	4	Total
Huskies	0	7	0	0	7
Vaqueros	7	0	7	13	27

at Robert and Janet Vackar Stadium, Edinburg, Texas

- Date: October 4
- Game time: 7:00 p.m. CDT
- Game weather: Clear, 89 °F (32 °C)
- Game attendance: 12,903
- Referee: Austin Mezzacasa
- TV announcers (ESPN+): Mark May (play-by-play), Aaron Saenz (analyst) and Jaeda Rael (sideline)
- Box score, Recap

Game information

First quarter

- RGV – Eddie Lee Marburger 30-yard run Brysen Gardner kick), 0:17. Vaqueros 7–0. Drive: 4 plays, 80 yards, 2:07.

Second quarter

- HCU – Xai'Shaun Edwards 1-yard run (Charlie Weinrich kick), 7:26. Tied 7–7. Drive: 17 plays, 75 yards, 7:51.

Third quarter

- RGV – Eddie Lee Marburger 1-yard run (Brysen Gardner kick), 9:12. Vaqueros 14–7. Drive: 9 plays, 75 yards, 5:48.

Fourth quarter

- RGV – Brysen Gardner 25-yard field goal, 12:48. Vaqueros 17–7. Drive: 10 plays, 47 yards, 3:56.
- RGV – Ismael Smith Flores 4-yard pass from Eddie Lee Marburger (Brysen Gardner kick), 5:03. Vaqueros 24–7. Drive: 8 plays, 56 yards, 5:30.
- RGV – Brysen Gardner 43-yard field goal, 2:41. Vaqueros 27–7. Drive: 4 plays, 8 yards, 1:14.

Statistics	HCU	RGV
First downs	16	16
Total yards	214	338
Rushing yards	49	207
Passing yards	165	131
Turnovers	2	2
Time of possession	28:37	31:23

Team	Category	Player	Statistics
Houston Christian	Passing	Jake Weir	18/35, 165 yards, INT
Houston Christian	Rushing	Xai'Shaun Edwards	23 carries, 101 yards, TD
Houston Christian	Receiving	Deuce McMillan	4 receptions, 40 yards
UT Rio Grande Valley	Passing	Eddie Lee Marburger	11/21, 131 yards, TD, 2 INT
UT Rio Grande Valley	Rushing	Eddie Lee Marburger	15 carries, 105 yards, 2 TD
UT Rio Grande Valley	Receiving	Xayvion Noland	2 receptions, 63 yards

=== At No. 17 Lamar ===
UT Rio Grande Valley Vaqueros (5–1) at No. 17 Lamar Cardinals (5–1) – Game summary

Quarter	1	2	3	4	Total
Vaqueros	0	7	0	14	21
No. 17 Cardinals	7	13	0	3	23

at Provost Umphrey Stadium, Beaumont, Texas

- Date: October 18
- Game time: 3:00 p.m. CDT
- Game weather: Cloudy, 80 °F (27 °C)
- Game attendance: 8,283
- Referee: Matt Beck
- TV announcers (ESPN+): Dan Gresham (play-by-play), LeMont Williams (analyst) and Bob Slovack (sideline)
- Box score, Recap

Game information
First quarter
- LAM – Blake Thomas 58-yard pass from Aiden McCown (Ben Woodward kick), 7:02. Cardinals 7–0. Drive: 6 plays, 71 yards, 2:11.

Second quarter

- LAM – Ben Woodward 30-yard field goal, 13:26. Cardinals 10–0. Drive: 11 plays, 71 yards, 5:23.
- LAM – Kyndon Fuselier 15-yard pass from Aiden McCown (Ben Woodward kick), 7:01. Cardinals 17–0. Drive: 10 plays, 65 yards, 4:44.
- RGV – Nathan Denney 5-yard run (Brysen Gardner kick), 2:00. Cardinals 17–7. Drive: 13 plays, 75 yards, 5:01.
- LAM – Ben Woodward 53-yard field goal, 0:00. Cardinals 20–7. Drive: 14 plays, 53 yards, 1:55.

Third quarter

- No scoring plays

Fourth quarter

- RGV – Tavian Cord 4-yard pass from Eddie Lee Marburger (Brysen Gardner kick), 14:52. Cardinals 20–14. Drive: 4 plays, 6 yards, 1:14.
- RGV – Xayvion Noland 9-yard pass from Eddie Lee Marburger (Brysen Gardner kick), 9:38. Vaqueros 21–20. Drive: 3 plays, 25 yards, 1:04.
- LAM – Ben Woodward 57-yard field goal, 1:03. Cardinals 23–21. Drive: 14 plays, 48 yards, 2:18.

Statistics	RGV	LAM
First downs	12	20
Total yards	189	375
Rushing yards	83	155
Passing yards	106	220
Turnovers	1	3
Time of possession	25:14	34:46

Team	Category	Player	Statistics
UT Rio Grande Valley	Passing	Eddie Lee Marburger	9/21, 106 yards, 2 TD, INT
UT Rio Grande Valley	Rushing	Nathan Denney	19 carries, 75 yards, TD
UT Rio Grande Valley	Receiving	Tony Diaz	3 receptions, 51 yards
Lamar	Passing	Aiden McCown	17/23, 203 yards, 2 TD, INT
Lamar	Rushing	Aiden McCown	15 carries, 88 yards
Lamar	Receiving	Blake Thomas	4 receptions, 77 yards, TD

=== Incarnate Word ===
Incarnate Word Cardinals (2–5) at UT Rio Grande Valley Vaqueros (5–2) – Game summary

Quarter	1	2	3	4	Total
Cardinals	0	0	21	7	28
Vaqueros	14	21	7	14	56

at Robert and Janet Vackar Stadium, Edinburg, Texas

- Date: October 25
- Game time: 7:00 p.m. CDT
- Game weather: Sunny, 90 °F (32 °C)
- Game attendance: 12,649
- Referee: Brian Bortness
- TV announcers (ESPN+): Mark May (play-by-play), Aaron Saenz (analyst) and Jaeda Rael (sideline)
- Box score, Recap

Game information
First quarter
- RGV – Ismael Smith Flores 25-yard pass from Eddie Lee Marburger (Brysen Gardner kick), 13:01. Vaqueros 7–0. Drive: 7 plays, 75 yards, 1:59.
- RGV – Ismael Smith Flores 43-yard pass from Eddie Lee Marburger (Brysen Gardner kick), 2:51. Vaqueros 14–0. Drive: 2 plays, 54 yards, 0:42.

Second quarter

- RGV – Nathan Denney 42-yard pass from Eddie Lee Marburger (Brysen Gardner kick), 14:14. Vaqueros 21–0. Drive: 6 plays, 66 yards, 2:00.
- RGV – Eddie Lee Marburger 12-yard run (Brysen Gardner kick), 10:44. Vaqueros 28–0. Drive: 5 plays, 78 yards, 1:53.
- RGV – Xayvion Noland 22-yard pass from Eddie Lee Marburger (Brysen Gardner kick), 1:46. Vaqueros 35–0. Drive: 6 plays, 48 yards, 0:52.

Third quarter

- UIW – Jalen Walthall 69-yard pass from EJ Colson (Will Faris kick), 14:31. Vaqueros 35–7. Drive: 3 plays, 75 yards, 0:29.
- UIW – EJ Colson 22-yard run (Will Faris kick), 9:14. Vaqueros 35–14. Drive: 9 plays, 79 yards, 2:50.
- UIW – Harlan Dixon 2-yard run (Will Faris kick), 5:03. Vaqueros 35–21. Drive: 8 plays, 79 yards, 2:38.
- RGV – Tony Diaz 3-yard pass from Eddie Lee Marburger (Brysen Gardner kick), 1:09. Vaqueros 42–21. Drive: 10 plays, 99 yards, 3:47.

Fourth quarter

- UIW – Jalen Walthall 39-yard pass from EJ Colson (Will Faris kick), 13:44. Vaqueros 42–28. Drive: 13 plays, 75 yards, 2:25.
- RGV – Xayvion Noland 75-yard pass from Eddie Lee Marburger (Brysen Gardner kick), 13:27. Vaqueros 49–28. Drive: 3 plays, 75 yards, 0:17.
- RGV – Jayden House 35-yard fumble return (Brysen Gardner kick), 10:33. Vaqueros 56–28.

Statistics	UIW	RGV
First downs	21	23
Total yards	440	548
Rushing yards	101	108
Passing yards	339	440
Turnovers	2	0
Time of possession	31:34	28:26

Team	Category	Player	Statistics
Incarnate Word	Passing	EJ Colson	29/45, 339 yards, 2 TD, INT
Incarnate Word	Rushing	EJ Colson	13 carries, 36 yards, TD
Incarnate Word	Receiving	Jalen Walthall	10 receptions, 220 yards, 2 TD
UT Rio Grande Valley	Passing	Eddie Lee Marburger	26/36, 440 yards, 6 TD
UT Rio Grande Valley	Rushing	Nathan Denney	13 carries, 64 yards
UT Rio Grande Valley	Receiving	Tony Diaz	17 receptions, 172 yards, TD

=== At No. 20 Stephen F. Austin ===
UT Rio Grande Valley Vaqueros (6–2) at No. 20 Stephen F. Austin Lumberjacks (6–2) – Game summary

Quarter	1	2	3	4	Total
Vaqueros	0	0	10	7	17
No. 20 Lumberjacks	17	10	7	7	41

at Homer Bryce Stadium, Nacogdoches, Texas

- Date: November 1
- Game time: 6:00 p.m. CDT
- Game weather: Cloudy, 63 °F (17 °C)
- Game attendance: 6,769
- Referee: Matt Beck
- TV announcers (ESPN+): Rob Meyers (play-by-play), Hunter Taylor (analyst) and Nicole Beckelman (sideline)
- Box score, Recap

Game information
First quarter
- SFA – Gavin Rutherford 1-yard run (Carlos Alvarado kick), 12:33. Lumberjacks 7–0. Drive: 9 plays, 95 yards, 2:21.
- SFA – Carlos Alvarado 30-yard field goal, 9:24. Lumberjacks 10–0. Drive: 9 plays, 23 yards, 2:53.
- SFA – Jaylen Jenkins 1-yard run (Carlos Alvarado kick), 2:26. Lumberjacks 17–0. Drive: 13 plays, 57 yards, 5:43.

Second quarter

- SFA – Clayton Wayland 9-yard pass from Sam Vidlak (Carlos Alvarado kick), 10:24. Lumberjacks 24–0. Drive: 13 plays, 96 yards, 4:27.
- SFA – Carlos Alvarado 29-yard field goal, 0:00. Lumberjacks 27–0. Drive: 16 plays, 57 yards, 7:09.

Third quarter

- RGV – Brysen Gardner 38-yard field goal, 7:53. Lumberjacks 27–3. Drive: 13 plays, 54 yards, 7:07.
- SFA – Kylon Harris 6-yard pass from Sam Vidlak (Carlos Alvarado kick), 3:45. Lumberjacks 34–3. Drive: 10 plays, 47 yards, 4:08.
- RGV – Tony Diaz 2-yard pass from Eddie Lee Marburger (Brysen Gardner kick), 0:00. Lumberjacks 34–10. Drive: 11 plays, 96 yards, 3:40.

Fourth quarter

- SFA – Clayton Wayland 10-yard pass from Sam Vidlak (Carlos Alvarado kick), 7:14. Lumberjacks 41–10. Drive: 19 plays, 96 yards, 7:40.
- RGV – Aidan Jakobsohn 6-yard run (Brysen Gardner kick), 2:20. Lumberjacks 41–17. Drive: 7 plays, 56 yards, 2:39.

Statistics	RGV	SFA
First downs	15	27
Total yards	215	448
Rushing yards	100	183
Passing yards	115	265
Turnovers	2	0
Time of possession	21:55	38:05

Team	Category	Player	Statistics
UT Rio Grande Valley	Passing	Eddie Lee Marburger	16/24, 115 yards, TD, 2 INT
UT Rio Grande Valley	Rushing	Aidan Jakobsohn	4 carries, 49 yards, TD
UT Rio Grande Valley	Receiving	Tony Diaz	6 receptions, 62 yards, TD
Stephen F. Austin	Passing	Sam Vidlak	25/32, 203 yards, 2 TD
Stephen F. Austin	Rushing	Jerrell Wimbley	11 carries, 87 yards
Stephen F. Austin	Receiving	Blaine Green	5 receptions, 68 yards

=== Nicholls ===
Nicholls Colonels (3–6) at UT Rio Grande Valley Vaqueros (6–3) – Game summary

Quarter	1	2	3	4	Total
Colonels	0	7	7	7	21
Vaqueros	7	7	7	7	28

at Robert and Janet Vackar Stadium, Edinburg, Texas

- Date: November 8
- Game time: 5:00 p.m. CST
- Game weather: Sunny, 92 °F (33 °C)
- Game attendance: 12,177
- Referee: Gary Leeper
- TV announcers (ESPN+): Mark May (pla-by-play), Aaron Saenz (analyst) and Jaeda Rael (sideline)
- Box score, Recap

Game information
First quarter
- RGV – Tony Diaz 4-yard pass from Eddie Lee Marburger (Brysen Gardner kick), 3:42. Vaqueros 7–0. Drive: 10 plays, 59 yards, 6:32.

Second quarter

- NICH – Miequle Brock Jr. 4-yard run (Gabriel Showalter kick), 12:10. Tied 7–7. Drive: 16 plays, 75 yards, 6:32.
- RGV – Nathan Denney 4-yard run (Brysen Gardner kick), 4:22. Vaqueros 14–7. Drive: 14 plays, 94 yards, 5:14.

Third quarter

- NICH – Everett Hunter 16-yard pass from Ean Rodrigue (Gabriel Showalter kick), 7:22. Tied 14–14. Drive: 2 plays, 22 yards, 0:50.
- RGV – Nathan Denney 7-yard run (Brysen Gardner kick), 3:29. Vaqueros 21–14. Drive: 2 plays, 35 yards, 0:42.

Fourth quarter

- RGV – Tavian Cord 44-yard pass from Eddie Lee Marburger (Brysen Gardner kick), 10:15. Vaqueros 28–14. Drive: 9 plays, 65 yards, 3:31.
- NICH – Shane Lee 8-yard run (Gabriel Showalter kick), 6:14. Vaqueros 28–21. Drive: 10 plays, 66 yards, 4:01.

Statistics	NICH	RGV
First downs	20	19
Total yards	327	392
Rushing yards	126	145
Passing yards	201	247
Turnovers	2	1
Time of possession	32:23	27:37

Team	Category	Player	Statistics
Nicholls	Passing	Ean Rodrigue	19/32, 193 yards, TD
Nicholls	Rushing	Shane Lee	13 carries, 56 yards, TD
Nicholls	Receiving	Scrappy Osby	6 receptions, 66 yards
UT Rio Grande Valley	Passing	Eddie Lee Marburger	20/30, 247 yards, 2 TD, INT
UT Rio Grande Valley	Rushing	Nathan Denney	25 carries, 120 yards, 2 TD
UT Rio Grande Valley	Receiving	Tavian Cord	4 receptions, 84 yards, TD

=== At McNeese ===
UT Rio Grande Valley Vaqueros at McNeese Cowboys – Game summary

Quarter	1	2	3	4	Total
Vaqueros	0	14	0	14	28
Cowboys	10	0	3	0	13

at Cowboy Stadium, Lake Charles, Louisiana

- Date: November 15
- Game time: 6:00 p.m. CST
- Game weather: Sunny, 70 °F (21 °C)
- Game attendance: 9,929
- Referee: Craig Helser
- TV announcers (ESPN+): Jeff Palermo (play-by-play), Chaston Tavares (analyst) and Rylee Eyster (sideline)
- Box score, Recap

Game information
First quarter
- MCN – Deaglan Camron 35-yard field goal, 3:16. Cowboys 3–0. Drive: 9 plays, 43 yards, 5:28.
- MCN – Matthew McCallister 85-yard pass from Jake Strong (Deaglan Camron kick), 0:07. Cowboys 10–0. Drive: 2 plays, 83 yards, 0:57.

Second quarter

- RGV – Tavian Cord 21-yard pass from Eddie Lee Marburger (Brysen Gardner kick), 4:47. Cowboys 10–7. Drive: 5 plays, 45 yards, 2:40.
- RGV – Tony Diaz 7-yard pass from Eddie Lee Marburger (Brysen Gardner kick), 0:26. Vaqueros 14–10. Drive: 12 plays, 91 yards, 2:03.

Third quarter

- MCN – Deaglan Camron 27-yard field goal, 3:55. Vaqueros 14–13. Drive: 16 plays, 65 yards, 8:51.

Fourth quarter

- RGV – Tony Diaz 75-yard pass from Eddie Lee Marburger (Brysen Gardner kick), 14:11. Vaqueros 21–13. Drive: 4 plays, 80 yards, 1:06.
- RGV – Tony Diaz 7-yard pass from Eddie Lee Marburger (Brysen Gardner kick), 4:12. Vaqueros 28–13. Drive: 9 plays, 88 yards, 4:49.

Statistics	RGV	MCN
First downs	18	22
Total yards	365	414
Rushing yards	108	123
Passing yards	257	291
Turnovers	0	2
Time of possession	23:36	36:24

Team	Category	Player	Statistics
UT Rio Grande Valley	Passing	Eddie Lee Marburger	17/29, 257 yards, 4 TD
UT Rio Grande Valley	Rushing	Nathan Denney	14 carries, 57 yards
UT Rio Grande Valley	Receiving	Tony Diaz	7 receptions, 134 yards, 3 TD
McNeese	Passing	Jake Strong	25/35, 275 yards, TD, 2 INT
McNeese	Rushing	Coleby Hamm	13 carries, 49 yards
McNeese	Receiving	Matthew McCallister	6 receptions, 140 yards, TD

=== East Texas A&M ===
East Texas A&M Lions at UT Rio Grande Valley Vaqueros – Game summary

Quarter	1	2	3	4	Total
Lions	7	0	0	7	14
Vaqueros	7	13	3	10	33

at Robert and Janet Vackar Stadium, Edinburg, Texas

- Date: November 22
- Game time: 5:00 p.m. CST
- Game weather: Cloudy
- Game attendance: 12,320
- Referee: Gary Leeper
- TV announcers (ESPN+): Mark May (play-by-play), Aaron Saenz (analyst) and Jaeda Rael (sideline)
- Box score, Recap

Game information
First quarter
- ETAM – EJ Oakmon 1-yard run (Ozlo Rigby kick), 6:38. Lions 7–0. Drive: 18 plays, 80 yards, 8:16.
- RGV – Logic Hudgens 52-yard interception return (Brysen Gardner kick), 3:17. Tied 7–7.

Second quarter

- RGV – Ismael Smith Flores 20-yard pass from Eddie Lee Marburger (Brysen Gardner kick), 7:55. Vaqueros 14–7. Drive: 12 plays, 91 yards, 6:49.
- RGV – Brysen Gardner 31-yard field goal, 3:15. Vaqueros 17–7. Drive: 5 plays, 28 yards, 2:37.
- RGV – Brysen Gardner 36-yard field goal, 0:00. Vaqueros 20–7. Drive: 6 plays, 47 yards, 0:39.

Third quarter

- RGV – Brysen Gardner 22-yard field goal, 9:02. Vaqueros 23–7. Drive: 7 plays, 34 yards, 3:22.

Fourth quarter

- RGV – Kyran Lee 4-yard pass from Eddie Lee Marburger (Brysen Gardner kick), 13:05. Vaqueros 30–7. Drive: 12 plays, 69 yards, 6:44.
- RGV – Brysen Gardner 31-yard field goal, 4:01. Vaqueros 33–7. Drive: 10 plays, 72 yards, 4:59.
- ETAM – Tyler Daniels 24-yard pass from Jack Jacobs (Ozlo Rigby kick), 1:54. Vaqueros 33–14. Drive: 7 plays, 72 yards, 1:58.

Statistics	ETAM	RGV
First downs	23	25
Total yards	314	312
Rushing yards	127	171
Passing yards	187	141
Turnovers	3	0
Time of possession	30:07	29:53

Team	Category	Player	Statistics
East Texas A&M	Passing	Eric Rodriguez	10/25, 97 yards, 2 INT
East Texas A&M	Rushing	KJ Shankle	9 rushes, 32 yards
East Texas A&M	Receiving	Christian Jourdain	8 receptions, 89 yards
UT Rio Grande Valley	Passing	Eddie Lee Marburger	17/22, 141 yards, 2 TD
UT Rio Grande Valley	Rushing	Nathan Denney	26 rushes, 158 yards
UT Rio Grande Valley	Receiving	Tony Diaz	5 receptions, 50 yards

== Roster ==
2025 UT Rio Grande Valley Vaqueros football team roster
Players
Coaches
Offense

Pos.	#	Name	Class
WR	1	Gunner Naivar	Fr
QB	2	Atzel Chavez Jr.	Fr
QB	3	Aidan Jakobsohn	Fr
WR	4	Xayvion Noland	So
WR	5	Justin Herman	So
RB	6	Brennan Carroll	Fr
TE	8	Ismael Smith-Flores	So
QB	9	Jaxon Baize	Fr
WR	10	Cameron Glenn	Fr
WR	11	Tavian Cord	Jr
QB	12	Eddie Lee Marburger	Sr
WR	14	Tony Diaz	Fr
WR	15	Hunter Luke	So
QB	17	Jayden Paluseo	Fr
WR	18	Kyran Lee	Fr
WR	19	Javien Cuff	GS
RB	20	TJ Dement	Fr
RB	24	Fabian Garcia	Fr
RB	26	Broderick Taylor	Fr
RB	28	Jamal Polley	Fr
RB	32	Nathan Denney	GS
RB	34	Djouvensky Schlenbaker	Jr
OL	50	Luis Gonzalez	Sr
OL	55	Abram Nicklas	Jr
OL	57	Nick Hughes	Fr
OL	59	TK Mina	Jr
OL	62	Jose Gonzalez-Vargas	Fr
OL	64	Cole Molina	Fr
OL	65	Qai Smith	So
OL	66	Vicente Hughes	GS
OL	68	Blake Zeller	Fr
OL	70	Frank Medina	So
OL	71	Kingsley Ejiofor	GS
OL	72	Tate Davis	Fr
OL	73	Gannon Lauer	Jr
OL	74	Grayson Zuma	Fr
OL	75	Roman Hernandez	Fr
OL	76	Mehkhi Blue	Fr
OL	77	Thomas Domian	So
OL	78	Brenden Jones	Fr
OL	79	Wes Thompson	So
WR	80	Corey Holmes	Fr
WR	81	Christian Sabsook	Fr
WR	82	Keilan Sweeny	Fr
WR	83	Sergio Aparicio	Fr
WR	84	Zion Brown	Fr
TE	85	Nathan Luschen	Fr
TE	86	Noah Staples	Sr
WR	87	Claudio Torres	Fr
TE	88	Jaxson Shupe	Fr
TE	89	Mateo Grajeda	Fr
TE	94	Brendon Ray	Fr

Defense

Pos.	#	Name	Class
LB	0	Jaxson Maynard	Fr
DB	1	Alijah Prosser	Fr
DB	2	TJ Neal	Jr
DB	3	Logic Hudgens	Sr
DB	4	Marcus Heard Jr.	Jr
DB	6	Keion Bryant	Jr
DE	7	DaCorien Thompson	Fr
DB	8	Elijah Graham	Sr
DE	9	Ian Box	Jr
DB	10	Jaden Adkins	Fr
CB	16	Austin Trimble	GS
S	17	Keamonie Archie	So
DB	21	Nolan White	Fr
DB	22	Dorian Blackwell	Sr
LB	23	Jaiden Haygood	Fr
DB	25	Marcus Malvoisin	GS
DB	26	Shane Werner	Fr
DB	27	Andrew Earls	Fr
DB	28	Jaden Pettway	Fr
DB	29	Oscar Nnanna	Fr
LB	30	Tyler Day	Fr
DB	31	Gavin Collins	Fr
LB	33	Landen Gaskamp	Fr
DB	35	Carter Hewitt	Fr
DB	36	Nicholas Peace	Fr
DB	38	Jarius Williams	Fr
LB	40	Caleb Warren	Fr
DE	41	Connor Carrigan	So
DL	42	Nathan Huerta	Jr
DB	43	Kayden Cooper	Fr
LB	44	Warren Shankle	GS
LB	45	Spencer Rich	GS
LB	46	Michael Lucien	GS
DE	47	Amari Pouncy	GS
LB	48	Trey Bright	Fr
DE	49	Ja'Marcus Anderson	Fr
DE	51	Tayshaun Davis	Fr
DE	53	Seyyid Smith	Jr
DL	54	Lathan Morse	Jr
LB	56	Jackson Waid	Fr
DE	58	Abdon Mata	Fr
DL	60	Vernon Green	Fr
DL	61	Abram Garcia	Fr
DL	63	Jayden House	Jr
DL	69	D'Andre Harwell	Fr
DL	90	Jaden Wincher	Fr
DE	91	Withchiel Falimar	Jr
DE	92	David Nwabouku	Fr
DE	93	Percy Jackson III	Jr
DL	95	Andrew Arriola	So
DL	98	Jack Harwell	Fr
DL	99	Nicholas Fernandez	So

Special teams

Pos.	#	Name	Class
P	5	Ty Bush	Fr
K	37	Troop O'Neal	Fr
K	39	Brysen Gardner	So
P	43	William Rogalinski	Fr
LS	52	Connor Cortez	So
K	96	Jose Contreras	Fr
P	97	Nathaniel Wallace-Dilling	Jr

Head coach

- Travis Bush (1st season)

Coordinators/assistant coaches

- Jeff Bowen (offensive coordinator/offensive line)
- Brian Gamble (defensive coordinator/linebackers)
- Marcus Coleman (special teams coordinator/cornerbacks)
- Mike Barela (tight ends)
- Gunnar Henderson (wide receivers)
- Nate Langford (defensive line)
- James Lockhart IV (outside linebackers)
- Adrian McDonald (passing game coordinator/safeties)
- Marco Regalado (running backs)
- Mike Schultz (senior offensive assistant)
- John Simmons (director of football operations/administrator)
- Don Sommer (head football strength and conditioning)

Legend

- (C) Team captain
- (S) Suspended
- (I) Ineligible
- Injured
- Redshirt

Roster
Last update: July 31, 2025
