= Seguin High School =

Seguin High School may refer to:

- Seguin High School (Arlington, Texas), named after Juan Seguín
- Seguin High School (Seguin, Texas), named after the city of Seguin
