= Seguin High School (Seguin, Texas) =

Public school in Seguin, Texas, United States

Location
- 1315 E Cedar St, Seguin, TX; Seguin, Texas 78155; United States; 29.5776°N 97.9472°W

Information
- School type: High School
- Established: 1953; 73 years ago
- School district: Seguin Independent School District
- Superintendent: Dr. Jack Lee
- Principal: Alberto Munoz
- Grades: 9-12
- Enrollment: 1,998 (2025–2026)
- Colors: Gold and Black
- Athletics conference: UIL Class 5A
- Mascot: Matador
- Website: schools.seguin.k12.tx.us/page/SHS.home

Seguin High School is a public high school located in Seguin, Texas as part of the Seguin Independent School District. It serves much of Guadalupe County, including Seguin, Kingsbury, and McQueeney. The school is classified as a 5A school by the University Interscholastic League.

== Athletics ==
The Matadors compete in sports such as baseball, softball, soccer, basketball, tennis, cross country, track and field, football, wrestling, golf, and volleyball, in addition to having fine arts programs in band, cheerleading, choir, dance, mariachi, theatre, visual art, and ballet.

=== Football ===
The Matadors Football Team has qualified for the UIL Playoffs 21 times since the school's founding, notably qualifying for five consecutive playoff appearances between 2018 and 2022.

== Notable alumni ==
- Corey Dailey (2026), college football quarterback for the Pittsburgh Panthers
