= Corey Dailey =

American football player (born 2007)

No. 16 – Pittsburgh Panthers
- Position: Quarterback
- Class: Freshman

Personal information
- Born: December 27, 2007 (age 18)
- Listed height: 6 ft 6 in (1.98 m)
- Listed weight: 200 lb (91 kg)

Career information
- High school: Seguin (Seguin, Texas)
- College: Pittsburgh (2026–present)
- Stats at ESPN

Corey Dailey (born December 27, 2007) is an American college football quarterback for the Pittsburgh Panthers.

== Early life ==
Dailey attended Seguin High School in Seguin, Texas, where he was a four-year starter at quarterback. As a junior he was the District 13-5A Offensive MVP after passing for 2,529 yards with 35 touchdowns. As a senior, he passed for 2,921 yards with 22 touchdowns and also rushed for 660 yards with 13 touchdowns. Dailey finished his career with school records for passing touchdowns (100), total touchdowns (122), completions (757), passing yards (9,138) and total yards (10,009). A four-star recruit, he was selected to play in the Navy All-American Bowl. He committed to the University of Pittsburgh to play college football.

== College career ==
Dailey started his freshman season at Pittsburgh as the teams third stringer behind Mason Heintschel and Holden Geriner. After Heintschel suffered a season-ending injury during the season, he moved up to become Geriner's backup.
