= Seguin Independent School District =

School district in Texas, United States

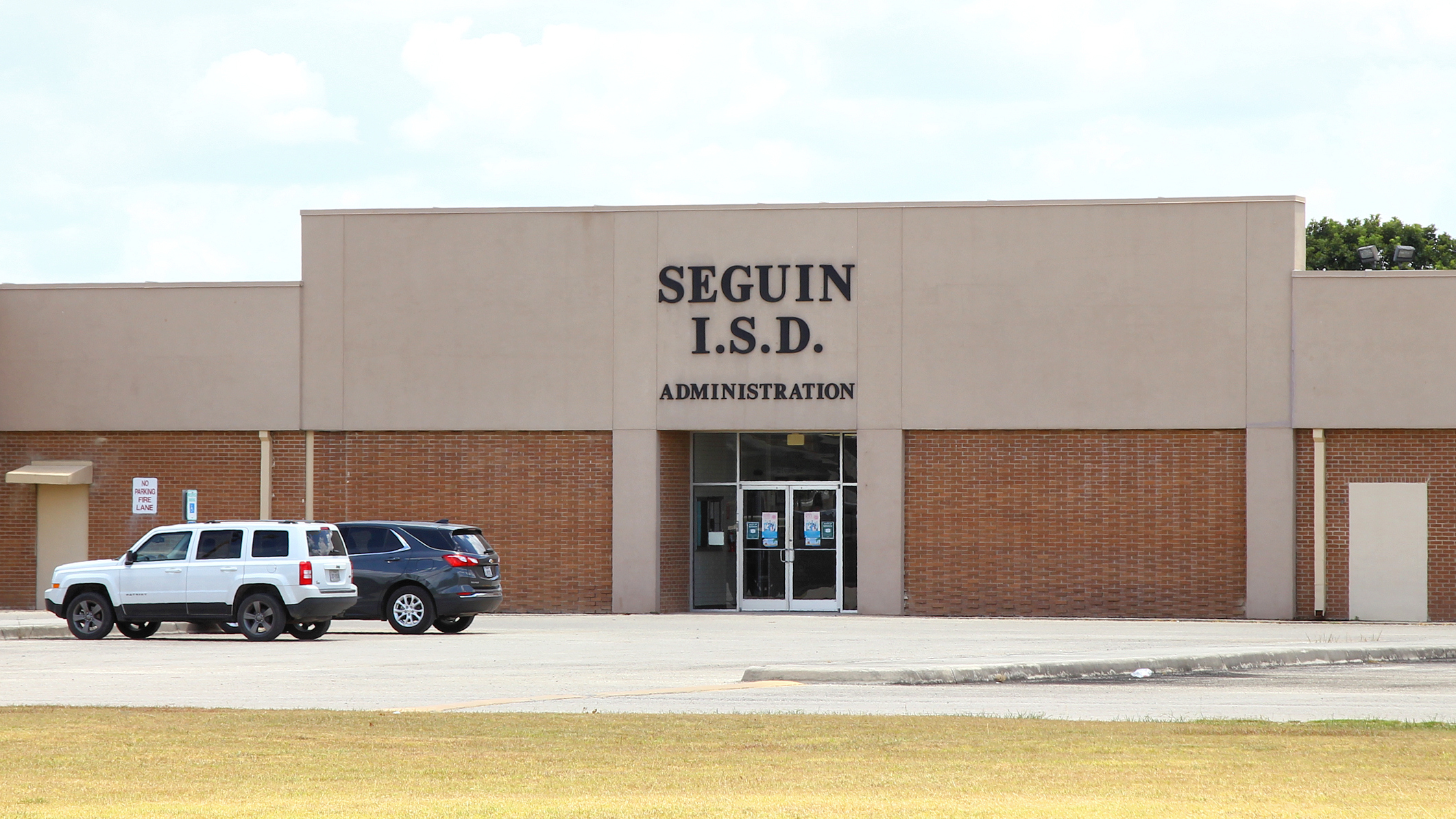

Seguin Independent School District is a public school district based in Seguin, Texas, United States.

In addition to Seguin, the district also serves the communities of McQueeney and Kingsbury.

In 2009 and 2010, the school district was rated "recognized" by the Texas Education Agency.

== History ==
In 2016 Seguin ISD attempted to buy the radio station KWED, owned by Guadalupe Media. The radio station acts as the publisher for the Seguin Daily News. The board of trustees approved a deal in which the district would have paid Guadalupe Media $400,000, to lease the station, with an option to buy it after the payment period of five years ($75,000 per year). The district would have decided which employees would remain at the station. The payments would have been in increments over a five-year period. By August of that year Guadalupe Media backed out of the deal. The radio station had previously aired criticism against the school district. Eliana Reihl, a candidate for a school board position, stated her belief that the district was motivated to silence criticism. Some other critics argued that the radio station was losing money and that the district would have to pay additional money to keep the station afloat.

== Schools ==
=== Secondary schools ===
- Grades 9-12
  - Seguin High School
  - Mercer Blumberg Learning Center at Saegert
  - Seguin Alternative School

=== Middle schools ===
- Grades 6-8
  - A.J. Briesemeister Middle School
  - Jim Barnes Middle School

=== Elementary schools ===
- Grades K-5
  - F.C. Weinert Elementary
  - George W. Vogel Elementary
  - Jefferson Elementary
  - McQueeney Elementary
  - Oralia Rodriguez Elementary
  - Robert F. Koennecke Elementary
  - Vincent Patlán Elementary
- Pre-kindergarten
  - Ball Early Childhood Center
