= McQueeney, Texas =

- Census-designated place
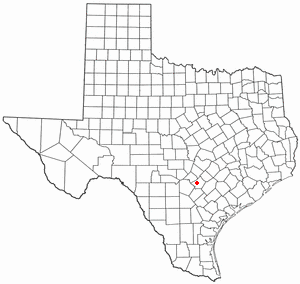
- Location of McQueeney, Texas

- Coordinates: 29°36′20″N 98°02′54″W
- Country: United States
- State: Texas
- County: Guadalupe

Area
  - Total: 4.6 sq mi (11.8 km^{2})
  - Land: 4.2 sq mi (10.8 km^{2})
  - Water: 0.39 sq mi (1.0 km^{2})
- Elevation: 541 ft (165 m)

Population (2020)
  - Total: 2,397
  - Density: 575/sq mi (222/km^{2})
- Time zone: UTC-6 (Central (CST))
  - Summer (DST): UTC-5 (CDT)
- ZIP code: 78123
- Area code: 830
- FIPS code: 48-45948
- GNIS feature ID: 2408804

McQueeney is an unincorporated community and census-designated place (CDP) in Guadalupe County, Texas, United States. The population was 2,397 at the 2020 census. It is part of the San Antonio Metropolitan Statistical Area.

== History ==
German settlers first moved to the area around 1870. When the Galveston, Harrisburg & San Antonio railroad was built through the area in 1876, the stop was named "Hilda". In 1900, a local businessman, C. F. Blumberg, built a general store east of the rail stop. Hoping to get the railroad to move the stop from Hilda to his store, Blumberg called the site "McQueeney", in honor of the local railroad superintendent. The railroad was not persuaded, but the post office that opened in 1900 was called McQueeney.

Lake McQueeney was created in 1925 by damming the Guadalupe River. Treasure Island, a wealthy enclave of homeowners on the lake, has flooded several times, most notably in 1972, 1998, and 2002.

== Geography ==
McQueeney is located in central Guadalupe County on the west side of the Guadalupe River. It is 6 miles (10 km) west of the center of Seguin, the county seat, 10 miles (16 km) southeast of New Braunfels, and 33 miles (53 km) northeast of downtown San Antonio.

According to the United States Census Bureau, the CDP has a total area of 4.6 square miles (11.8 km^{2}), of which 4.2 square miles (10.8 km^{2}) are land and 0.4 square miles (1.0 km^{2}), or 8.59%, are water.

== Demographics ==
Historical population
Census	Pop.	Note	%±
1980	1,332		—
1990	2,063		54.9%
2000	2,527		22.5%
2010	2,545		0.7%
2020	2,397		−5.8%
U.S. Decennial Census; 1850–1900 1910; 1920 1930 1940; 1950 1960 1970; 1980 1990 2000; 2010 2020

McQueeney first appeared as a census designated place in the 1980 United States census.

=== 2020 census ===
McQueeney CDP, Texas – Racial and ethnic composition Note: the US Census treats Hispanic/Latino as an ethnic category. This table excludes Latinos from the racial categories and assigns them to a separate category. Hispanics/Latinos may be of any race.
Race / Ethnicity (NH = Non-Hispanic)	Pop 2000	Pop 2010	Pop 2020	% 2000	% 2010	% 2020
White alone (NH)	1,916	1,696	1,456	75.82%	66.64%	60.74%
Black or African American alone (NH)	18	61	44	0.71%	2.40%	1.84%
Native American or Alaska Native alone (NH)	17	14	12	0.67%	0.55%	0.50%
Asian alone (NH)	6	7	12	0.24%	0.28%	0.50%
Native Hawaiian or Pacific Islander alone (NH)	4	3	0	0.16%	0.12%	0.00%
Other race alone (NH)	7	0	18	0.28%	0.00%	0.75%
Mixed race or Multiracial (NH)	21	30	78	0.83%	1.18%	3.25%
Hispanic or Latino (any race)	538	734	777	21.29%	28.84%	32.42%
Total	2,527	2,545	2,397	100.00%	100.00%	100.00%

=== 2000 census ===
As of the census of 2000, there were 2,527 people, 1,018 households, and 722 families residing in the CDP. The population density was 608.8 inhabitants per square mile (235.1/km^{2}). There were 1,269 housing units at an average density of 305.7 per square mile (118.0/km^{2}). The racial makeup of the CDP was 87.61% White, 0.75% African American, 0.79% Native American, 0.24% Asian, 0.16% Pacific Islander, 8.79% from other races, and 1.66% from two or more races. Hispanic or Latino of any race were 21.29% of the population.

There were 1,018 households, out of which 28.7% had children under the age of 18 living with them, 60.4% were married couples living together, 7.0% had a female householder with no husband present, and 29.0% were non-families. 23.2% of all households were made up of individuals, and 7.8% had someone living alone who was 65 years of age or older. The average household size was 2.48 and the average family size was 2.94.

In the CDP, the population was spread out, with 23.1% under the age of 18, 8.0% from 18 to 24, 26.6% from 25 to 44, 28.0% from 45 to 64, and 14.3% who were 65 years of age or older. The median age was 40 years. For every 100 females, there were 102.8 males. For every 100 females age 18 and over, there were 99.1 males.

The median income for a household in the CDP was $42,317, and the median income for a family was $47,464. Males had a median income of $28,333 versus $23,375 for females. The per capita income for the CDP was $21,079. About 2.0% of families and 4.3% of the population were below the poverty line, including 2.8% of those under age 18 and 4.5% of those age 65 or over.

== Education ==
McQueeney is served by the Seguin Independent School District.
