= Tony Diaz (American football) =

American football player (born 2006)

No. 14 – Iowa Hawkeyes
- Position: Wide receiver
- Class: Redshirt Sophomore

Personal information
- Born: July 11, 2006 (age 20)
- Listed height: 5 ft 10 in (1.78 m)
- Listed weight: 184 lb (83 kg)

Career information
- High school: San Marcos (San Marcos, Texas)
- College: UT Rio Grande Valley (2024–2025); Iowa (2026–present)
- Stats at ESPN

Tony Diaz (born July 21, 2006) is an American college football wide receiver for the Iowa Hawkeyes. He previously played for the UT Rio Grande Valley Vaqueros.

== Early life ==
Diaz attended San Marcos High School in San Marcos, Texas. During his high school career he had 95 receptions for 2,216 yards and 29 touchdowns. He committed to the University of Texas Rio Grande Valley (UTRGV) to play college football.

== College career ==
After redshirting his first year at UTRGV in 2024, Diaz had 68 receptions for 875 yards and 11 touchdowns in 2025. After the season, he entered the transfer portal and transferred to the University of Iowa. He competed for a starting job his first year at Iowa in 2026.
