= San Marcos High School (Texas) =

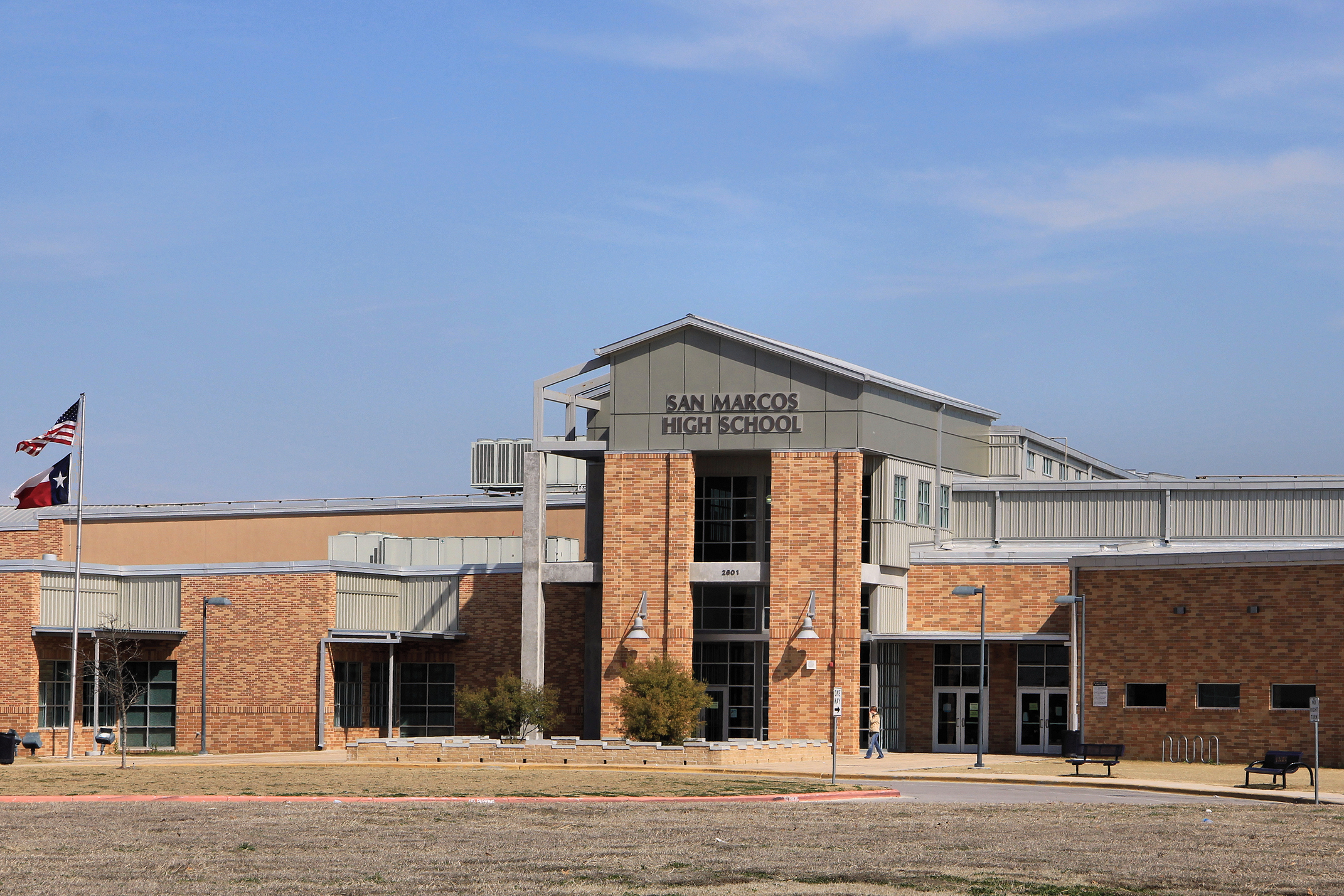

Location
- 2601 Rattler Road; San Marcos, Texas 78666; United States; 29°49′23″N 97°57′04″W

Information
- Type: Public
- Motto: One School, One Student Body, Rattlers Forever
- Founded: 1918
- Founder: Southwest Texas Normal School
- School district: San Marcos Consolidated Independent School District
- CEEB code: 446325
- Principal: Twila Guajarado
- Teaching staff: 168.21 (FTE)
- Grades: 9 - 12
- Enrollment: 2,333 (2025–2026)
- Average class size: 18.6 - 23.6
- Student to teacher ratio: 14.83
- Colors: White and purple
- Slogan: Home of the Rattlers
- Athletics conference: UIL Class 6A
- Mascot: Rattler
- Accreditation: Texas Education Agency
- Budget: $10,282,180
- Feeder schools: Miller Middle School and Goodnight Middle School
- Website: smhs.smcisd.net

San Marcos High School is a secondary school in San Marcos, Texas. The school serves grades 9 through 12, and is part of the San Marcos Consolidated Independent School District (CISD). The school appeared in the movie Boyhood starring Ellar Coltrane.

== History ==
In 1918 Southwest Texas Normal School (SWT) built the Education Building “intended in large part as a demonstration and laboratory school.” San Marcos High School was originally built on the block of Comanche and Hutchison. In 1939 the Auditorium-Laboratory School Building was completed by the college and all public school students, kindergarten through 6th grade, were housed there. By 1941 all the public school students were located on the college campus.

By 1949 the college and the public schools were so full that the last of the Coronal Buildings were destroyed to build a new High School on the site. In the fall of 1951 the first students moved into the brand new school, which consisted of grades 10-12. In the fall of 1952, grades 9 through 12 were housed in the high school.
Bonham Elementary opened in 1951, Travis Junior High School and Bowie Elementary opened in 1954, and Crockett Elementary in 1964. By 1965, all San Marcos Public Schools were gone from the Southwest Texas campus. In the following years, San Marcos CISD had continued to construct new campuses. This included the San Marcos High School which today is the Lamar Annex. It was used as the high school campus from 1951 until 1958. A newer High School was built in 1958 on Highway 123 and remained there for 45 years.

In 2003, San Marcos voters approved a multimillion-dollar bond to construct new district facilities, which included funds to construct the newly completed campus on McCarty Lane.

== Pride and tradition ==
Alma Mater: Hail to dear old S.M High School, High upon a hill. We have never lost our spirit, and we never will. Hail to Rattlers, Dear old Rattlers, loyal always be. Hail to thee, our Alma Mater, our hearts belong to thee.

Fight Song: Fight, Fight, Fight for San Marcos High; We have the spirit never to die. See our colors purple and white. We're out to win this game tonight. We are the Rattlers, best in the land. We play the game as best as we can. All you Snakes of S.M High, we're out to Fight, Fight, Fight. Yea Purple! Yea White! Yea Rattlers! Fight! Fight! Fight! Snakes fight! Snakes Fight! Yea Snakes Fight! (similar to the Notre Dame Fight Song melody)

Mascot: Rattler (Western Diamondback Rattlesnake)

Hand Sign: Hold index and middle finger up and bend them slightly to represent Rattler fangs.

== Alumni ==
The San Marcos Education Foundation is a non-profit, tax exempt 501(c)(3) public corporation operating independently under its own board of directors. The Foundation was created in 2003 to generate financial support for educational programs that are not available through the normal operating budget of the San Marcos CISD. The funds generated are used for programs and activities that facilitate student achievement, recognize and encourage staff excellence, and provide vital links between the community and the classroom. Part of the long term planning by the Foundation is to expand the support base of the SMCISD Community. A primary initiative included the formation of the San Marcos High School Alumni & Friends Association. Founding Members of the SMEF were Reece Boyd, Rose Brooks, John Navarrette, Bruce Harper, Scott Burton, Hon. David Chiu, Albert Sierra, Pete Weber, Mary Borm, Phil Sladek, Dr. Gwen Smith, Cathy Supple, Terry Jester, and Dr. John Beck.

The Mission of the San Marcos Alumni & Friends Association is to enrich and enhance lifelong relationships by uniting all alumni & friends and motivating them to support and promote the San Marcos Consolidated Independent School District through its partnership with the San Marcos Education Foundation.

Since 2005, the San Marcos Education Foundation has named Distinguished Alumni for leadership, volunteerism and professional success.

Distinguished Alumni Award (with their graduation years) are Dr. Gwen K. Smith, 1933; Dottie Sims, 1940; Patty Sherrill Sullivan, 1944; Handler Smith, 1953; Jimmie Scott, Ross King and Fran Contreras, 1954; Fraye Baldridge Stokes and H. C. Kyle III, 1955; Delores Crittendon, William W. Burnett, Harry Max Reasoner, Virginia Witte and Sarah Jane (King) Latham, 1956; Joyce Abel, 1958; William “Bill” Pennington and Dr. Tino Villaneuva, 1960.

Also, John A. Diaz, Dale Linebarger and Rita Morrison Jones 1961; Richard “Rusty” Phillips, Melba Vasquez, John Roberts and Edward O. Wiley, 1962; Georgia Hoody Cheatham, 1963; Reece Morrison, Linda Gregg Fields, Rebecca (Becky) Davis Tomblin, Wade Butler and Barbara Jones Chambers, 1964; Richard Cruz, Frank Arredondo, Randall Morris, Rebecca Y. Mendez Sierra, Dr. Janet Barton Speer and Loraine Harrison, 1964; Brenda Dale Perkins Butler, 1967; Homer Guerrero and Connie Laechein Bagley, 1968.

Additionally, Ruben Ruiz, Jr., Liz Champagne Johnson, Dolores Aguirre McAllister, Charles Soechting, Rodney Bingham and Jack Eben, 1969; Dr. Clay Sullivan and Herbert Yarbrough III 1970; Dawn Breihan-Hopp and Allan Van Fleet, 1971; Tricia Tingle and Judge Linda Ann Rodriguez, 1973; David Peterson, Javier Ledesma, Scott Yarbrough, Beth Stephen Beck, Melvin Callender and Dr. Rosina (Ruiz) Valle, 1974; Troy Kimmel, 1975; George Phillip Hansen, Scott Burton and Major General James William Hyatt, 1974; Carol Moore Hanes, Tony Walker and Elizabeth Crook, 1977.

Finally, Rene Ruiz and Elizabeth (Ingram) Tuttle, 1978; Sandra Cavazos, 1979; Mike Wacker, 1980; Darrell Hamlin and Shelley Scott Henry, 1981; Andrea Murdock McDaniel and Veronica Gonzales, 1982; Rob Thomas and Cinnamon Linda Strassman, 1983; Dr. Ellen Grimm, Helen Lowman and Ben Rodriguez, 1984; Kevin Brown, 1985; Robert Rodriguez, 1987; Rebecca Ybarra Ramirez, 1988; Steven Farr and Frank A. Arredondo, 1989; Michelle Castillo Moreno, 1991; Brandon Beck and Daniel Guerrero, 1995; Michelle Cearley Knight, 1997; Kharley (Bagley) Smith and Raquel Cervantes-Nunez, 1999.

Outstanding Young Alumnus Awardees are Jenni Finlay, 1997, and Taryn Guerrero, 2003.

=== Notable alumni ===
- Tony Diaz (2024), college football wide receiver for the Iowa Hawkeyes
