= UT Rio Grande Valley Vaqueros football =

Future American college football team

2026 UT Rio Grande Valley Vaqueros football team
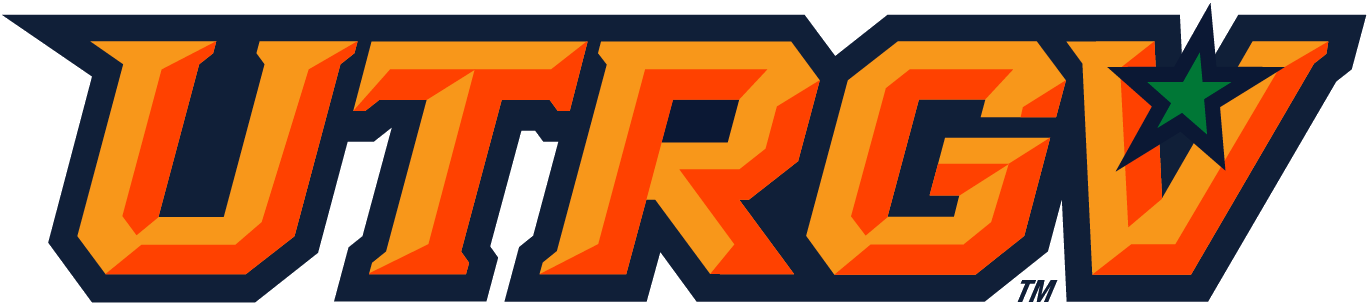
- First season: 1927; 99 years ago (Note: UTRGV was formed in 2015 with the merger of University of Texas–Pan American (UTPA) and University of Texas at Brownsville (UTB). Before the merger, UTB never had a football team, nonetheless, UTPA did field football, the team was known as the Edinburg Broncs, and played from 1927 to 1930. From 1931 to 1946, UTB did not have a football team, but was reinstated in and existed from 1947 to 1950. UTRGV sponsored its first team in 2025; 1 year ago.)
- Last season: 1950 (returned in 2025)
- Athletic director: Chasse Conque
- Head coach: Travis Bush; 2nd season, 9–3 (.750)
- Location: Brownsville, Texas; Edinburg, Texas
- Stadium: Robert and Janet Vackar Stadium (capacity: 12,000)
- NCAA division: Division I FCS
- Conference: Southland
- Colors: Orange and gray
- All-time record: 9–3 (.750)
- Website: Official website

The UT Rio Grande Valley Vaqueros football team represents the University of Texas Rio Grande Valley (UTRGV) in U.S. college football as a member of the Southland Conference in the NCAA Division I Football Championship Subdivision (FCS). They began play at that level in 2025, after an exhibition schedule in 2024. They are coached by Travis Bush.

The team traces its history to the Broncs (short for Broncos), which represented the University of Texas–Pan American (UTPA) – which merged with the University of Texas at Brownsville in 2015 to create The University of Texas Rio Grande Valley (UTRGV).

== History ==
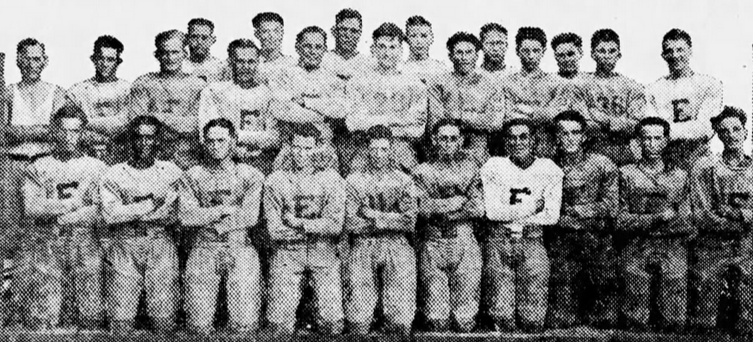
The 1927 Edinburg Broncs football team, with coach J. D. Foster at the top left

=== Edinburg Broncs ===
The University of Texas–Pan American (UTPA), which was merged with the University of Texas at Brownsville in 2015 to form the University of Texas Rio Grande Valley (UTRGV), had a football team when it was known as Edinburg College and was a junior college. Edinburg began play in 1927 and the name "Broncs" was chosen out of a number of others submitted in a naming contest. With J. D. Foster as head coach, the Broncs (also referred to as the Broncos or Bronchos) compiled a record of 4–2–3, which included a tie in their debut against the reserve squad of the Southwest Texas State Bobcats – now the Texas State Bobcats. After four seasons, the program was shut down, having not won more than four games in a year.

The team was revived in 1947 as a member of the South Texas Junior College Conference. The revived team hired Edinburg High School coach Bobby Cannon as head. He utilized a single-wing offense with what was described as a "famed shot-punt football system", but the team had limited success and he was relieved of his duties after two seasons. The Broncs played two seasons afterwards before the school board opted to discontinue it.

=== UTRGV Vaqueros ===
There was talk of reviving the team as Edinburg became UTPA and a four-year school, and as it later merged to become UTRGV. On January 14, 2021, it was reported that UTRGV had explored to create a football program at the NCAA Division I Football Championship Subdivision (FCS) level by 2024. At the time, it was believed that the program would compete as part of the newly reinstated football conference within the Western Athletic Conference (WAC).

The WAC announced the intended creation of this conference on the same day, as well as the addition of five new members to the conference in all sports, including football. The new members announced, effective July 1, 2022, include: Abilene Christian University, Lamar University, Sam Houston State University, and Stephen F. Austin State University, at that time all members of the Southland Conference (SLC), along with Southern Utah University, then of the Big Sky Conference (BSC). Shortly after the four SLC members announced their departure, that league expelled them, leading the WAC to move their arrival forward to 2021. However, further conference realignment led the WAC to merge its football league with that of the ASUN Conference (since reverted to its past name of Atlantic Sun Conference), with which it had a football-only alliance in the 2021 and 2022 seasons. The new league, known as the United Athletic Conference (UAC), started play in 2023, and UTRGV joined while being scheduled to first play at a later date.

Travis Bush was hired as the first coach of the UTRGV football team on December 11, 2022. UTRGV has since delayed the start of varsity football to the 2025 season, though it plans to play an exhibition schedule in 2024. It plans to play home games in Brownsville and Edinburg, both home to UTRGV campuses that it inherited from its predecessor institutions (respectively UT Brownsville and UT Pan American). The university has committed to establishing separate marching bands and spirit programs (cheerleading and dance) for the two campuses. In 2024, it was announced that the University had purchased H-E-B Park (formerly the home of the Rio Grande Valley FC Toros) to be the primary home of the football team in 2025, which will host all but one home game, as Sams Memorial Stadium in Brownsville will host a game every year. H-E-B Park was renamed to Robert and Janet Vackar Stadium on March 21, 2024, after two longtime UTRGV donors. On March 25, an announcement was made that UTRGV was moving to the Southland Conference, without ever having played a game in the UAC.

== Coaching staff ==
Name	Position	Tenure at UTRGV
Travis Bush	Head coach	2023–present
Brian Gamble	Assistant head coach / Defensive coordinator / Linebackers	2023–present
Jeff Bowen	Co-Offensive coordinator / Offensive line	2023–present
Theron Aych	Co-Offensive coordinator / Quarterbacks	2025–present
Adrian McDonald	Pass game coordinator / Safeties	2023–present
Gunnar Henderson	Pass game coordinator / Wide receivers	2023–present
Mike Barela	Run game coordinator / Tight ends	2023–present
Marco Regalado	Running backs	2023–present
James Lockhart IV	Outside linebackers	2023–present
Nate Langford	Defensive line	2023–present
Josh Jones	Special teams coordinator / Cornerbacks	2025–present

=== Conference affiliation ===
- 1927–1930: Unknown
- 1931–1946: No team
- 1947–1950: South Texas Junior College Conference
- 1951–2023: No team
- 2024: Exhibition team
- 2025–present: Southland Conference

== Future non-conference opponents ==
Announced non-conference opponents as of June 24, 2026.

2026	2027	2028	2029	2030	2031
UT Permian Basin	Texas A&M–Kingsville	at Rice	Prairie View A&M	at Montana	Montana
at UTSA	at Texas State	Central Arkansas		at Texas State	
at Central Arkansas	Prairie View A&M	at Prairie View A&M			
