= Kingsbury, Texas =

- Town
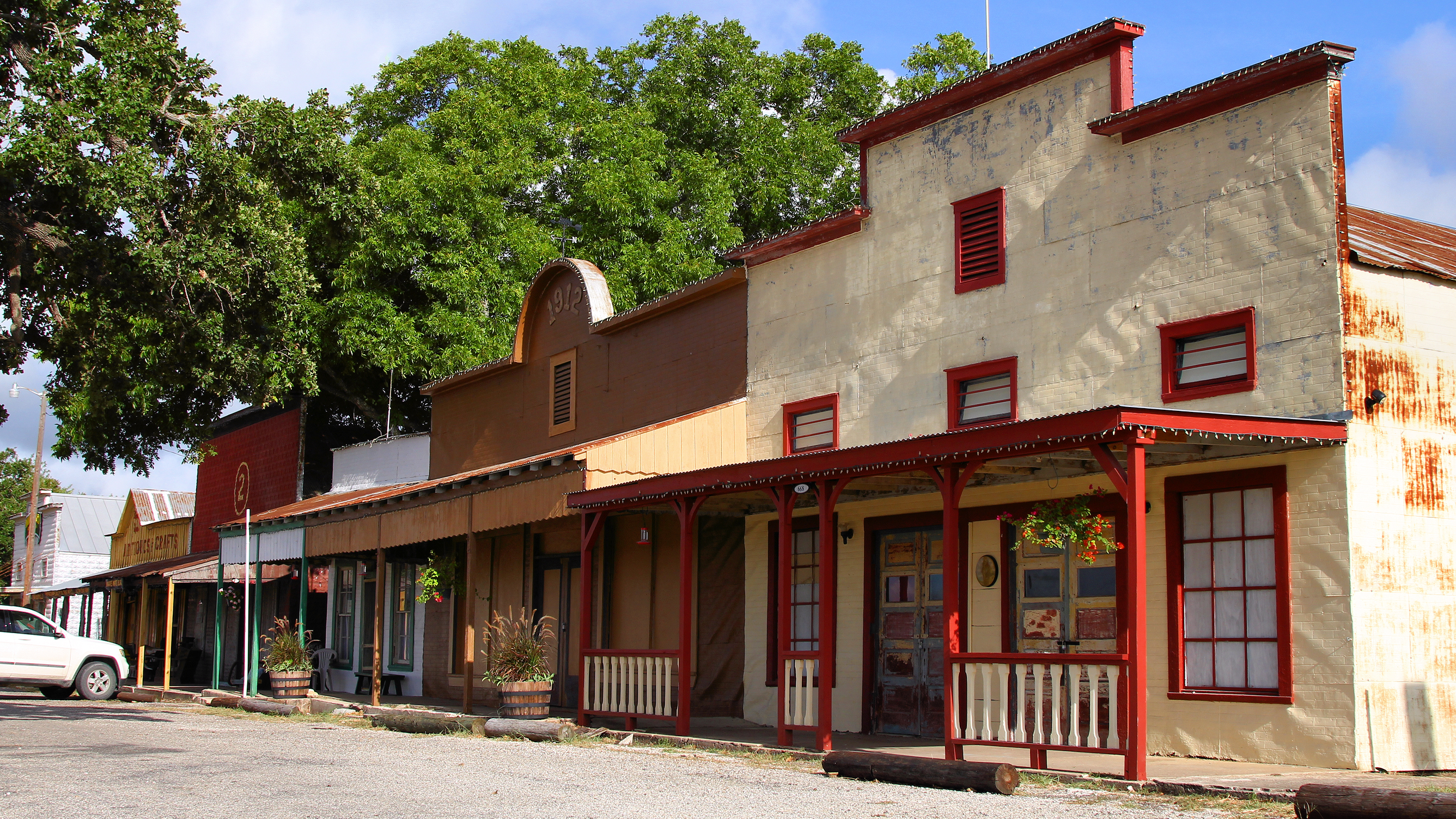

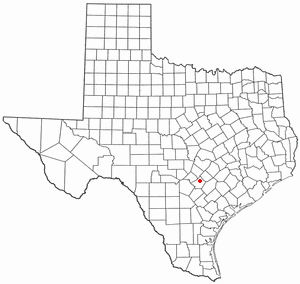
- Location of Kingsbury, Texas

- Coordinates: 29°38′31″N 97°47′05″W
- Country: United States
- State: Texas
- County: Guadalupe
- Founded: 1875 by Sam Neel
- Incorporated: May 19, 2015
- Named for: William Kingsbury

Area
  - Total: 2.58 sq mi (6.67 km^{2})
  - Land: 2.58 sq mi (6.67 km^{2})
  - Water: 0 sq mi (0.00 km^{2})
- Elevation: 554 ft (169 m)

Population (2020)
  - Total: 132
  - Density: 51.3/sq mi (19.8/km^{2})
- Time zone: UTC-6 (Central (CST))
  - Summer (DST): UTC-5 (CDT)
- ZIP code: 78638
- Area codes: 830, 512
- FIPS code: 48-39292
- GNIS feature ID: 2786433
- Website: www.kingsburytexas.org

Kingsbury is a city in Guadalupe County, Texas, United States. Kingsbury was a census-designated place in 2010. As of the 2020 census, Kingsbury had a population of 132. It is part of the San Antonio metropolitan area.

Voters elected to incorporate Kingsbury into a city in 2015.

== Geography ==
According to the United States Census Bureau, the CDP has a total area of 28.8 square miles (75 km^{2}), of which 28.8 square miles (75 km^{2}) is land and 0.1 square miles (0.26 km^{2}) (0.24%) is water.

== Demographics ==
Historical population
Census	Pop.	Note	%±
2020	132		—
2020 Census

=== 2020 census ===
As of the 2020 census, Kingsbury had a population of 132. The median age was 38.6 years. 34.8% of residents were under the age of 18 and 15.2% of residents were 65 years of age or older. For every 100 females there were 100.0 males, and for every 100 females age 18 and over there were 87.0 males age 18 and over.

There were 48 households in Kingsbury, of which 33.3% had children under the age of 18 living in them. Of all households, 56.3% were married-couple households, 20.8% were households with a male householder and no spouse or partner present, and 18.8% were households with a female householder and no spouse or partner present. About 20.9% of all households were made up of individuals and 10.4% had someone living alone who was 65 years of age or older.

There were 60 housing units, of which 20.0% were vacant. The homeowner vacancy rate was 0.0% and the rental vacancy rate was 0.0%.

0.0% of residents lived in urban areas, while 100.0% lived in rural areas.

Racial composition as of the 2020 census
Race	Number	Percent
White	101	76.5%
Black or African American	0	0.0%
American Indian and Alaska Native	1	0.8%
Asian	3	2.3%
Native Hawaiian and Other Pacific Islander	0	0.0%
Some other race	12	9.1%
Two or more races	15	11.4%
Hispanic or Latino (of any race)	28	21.2%

=== 2010 census ===
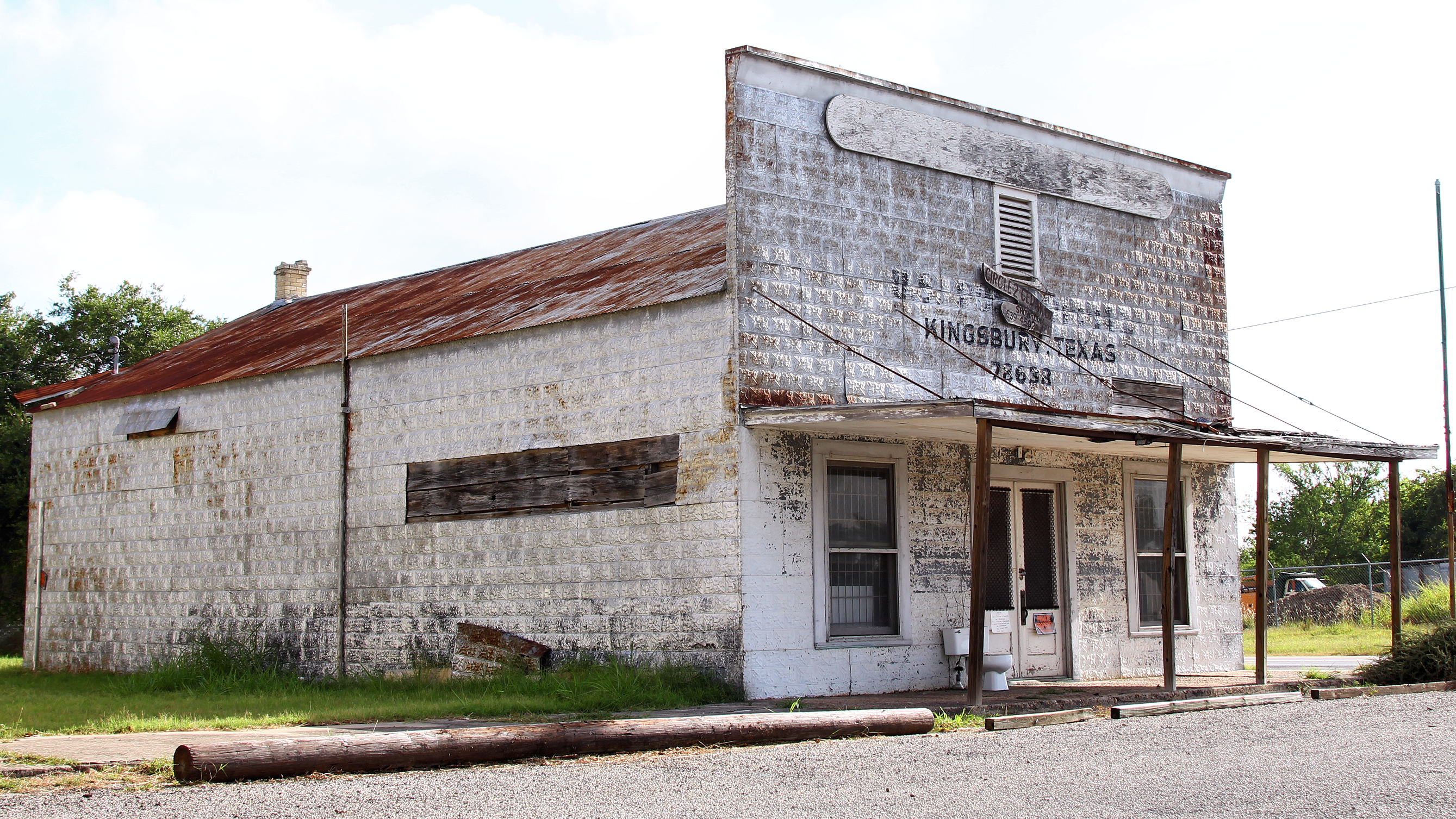
A historic commercial building in Kingsbury

As of the 2010 census there were 782 people, 302 households, and 229 families residing in Kingsbury. The population density was 22.7 people per square mile (8.8/km^{2}). There were 269 housing units at an average density of 9.3/sq mi (3.6/km^{2}). The racial makeup of city was 91.4% White, 1.3% African American, 1.8% Native American, 6.8% from other races, and 1.7% from two or more races. Hispanic or Latino of any race were 18.2% of the population.

There were 302 households, out of which 29.8% had children under the age of 18 living with them, 62.3% were married couples living together, 10.6% had a female householder with no husband present, and 24.2% were non-families. 17.9% of all households were made up of individuals, and 6.0% had someone living alone who was 65 years of age or older. The average household size was 2.59 and the average family size was 2.95.

In Kingsbury, the population was spread out, with 23.78% under the age of 20, 3.7% from 20 to 24, 29.4% from 25 to 44, 27.1% from 45 to 64, and 9.8% who were 65 years of age or older. The median age was 38 years. For every 100 females, there were 99.4 males. For every 100 females age 18 and over, there were 95.6 males.

The median income for a household in the CDP was $50,156, and the median income for a family was $60,536. Males had a median income of $38,750 versus $27,750 for females. The per capita income for the CDP was $21,744. About 4.3% of families and 8.7% of the population were below the poverty line, including 11.4% of those under age 18 and 9.6% of those age 65 or over.

== Education ==
Kingsbury is served by the Navarro Independent School District, Seguin Independent School District, Luling Independent School District, and the Prairie Lea Independent School District.
