= Robert and Janet Vackar Stadium =

Stadium in Edinburg, Texas

Coordinates: 26.2826°N 98.1352°W

- Interactive map of Robert and Janet Vackar Stadium
- Location: Edinburg, Texas
- Capacity: 13,500 (2026-present); Former capacity: List: 12,000 (2025); 10,000 (2017–24)
- Surface: Turf

Construction
- Groundbreaking: 2015
- Opened: March 22, 2017
- Expanded: 2024, 2025

Tenants
- Rio Grande Valley FC Toros (USLC) (2017–2023); UTRGV Vaqueros (NCAA) (2025–present)

Robert and Janet Vackar Stadium (formerly H-E-B Park) is a stadium in Edinburg, Texas. It served as the home of Rio Grande Valley FC Toros of the USL Championship from 2017 to 2023, and currently serves as the home of the UTRGV Vaqueros football team. The stadium has two stands with orange seats covered with a roof and a capacity of approximately 13,500.

== History ==
The stadium was originally intended to be complete before the 2016 USL season. The stadium opened on March 22, 2017 with an initial capacity of 9,735, with the Toros playing C.F. Monterrey from Mexico to inaugurate their new stadium. The Toros lost their exhibition match against Rayados 3–0 before a sellout crowd.

In February 2024, the University of Texas Rio Grande Valley announced that it had acquired the stadium for use as the primary venue for the new UTRGV Vaqueros football team, which began play in 2025. It was renamed after longtime UTRGV donors Robert and Janet Vackar on March 21, 2024.

=== Renovations ===
On September 25, 2024, UTRGV announced they would make enhancements to the stadium in preparation for the Vaqueros' inaugural season. These changes included adding 2,000 bleacher seats in the south end zone, 184 premium seats in the north end zone, lowering the field, and replacing the grass playing surface with synthetic turf. These changes brought the capacity of the stadium to around 12,000 seats in time for the 2025 NCAA football season.

== Year by year ==
UTRGV Vaqueros
Season	Average Crowd	Largest Crowd	Home Record
2025	12,531	12,903	7–0
2026	12,477	13,498	3–1
Total			10–1 (.909)
