= EJ Colson =

American football player

No. 1 – UTEP Miners
- Position: Quarterback
- Class: Redshirt Sophomore

Personal information
- Listed height: 6 ft 1 in (1.85 m)
- Listed weight: 219 lb (99 kg)

Career information
- High school: Cedar Grove (Ellenwood, Georgia)
- College: UCF (2024); Incarnate Word (2025); UTEP (2026–present)
- Stats at ESPN

Elliott Colson Jr. is an American football quarterback for the UTEP Miners. He previously played for the Incarnate Word Cardinals and for the UCF Knights.

== Early life ==
Colson attended Cedar Grove High School in Ellenwood, Georgia. During his high school career, he threw for 5,969 yards and 68 touchdowns and rushed for 1,354 yards and 16 touchdowns. Coming out of high school, Colson was rated as a three-star recruit by 247Sports and committed to play college football for the UCF Knights.

== College career ==
Colson made his first collegiate start in week 7 of the 2024 season against Cincinnati. He played three games with one start on the season, completing 9 of 16 pass attempts for 64 yards and a touchdown. After the season, Colson entered the NCAA transfer portal.

Colson transferred to play for the Incarnate Word Cardinals after previously committing to play for the Purdue Boilermakers. In 2025, he completed 210 of his 296 pass attempts for 2,142 yards and 16 touchdowns and rushed for 287 yards and three touchdowns in 10 starts. After the season, Colson entered the NCAA transfer portal.

Colson transferred to play for the UTEP Miners. Heading into the 2026 season, he was named the team's starting quarterback.
