= 2025 Idaho Vandals football team =

American college football season

2025 Idaho Vandals football
- Conference: Big Sky Conference
- Record: 4–8 (2–6 Big Sky)
- Head coach: Thomas Ford (1st season)
- Offensive coordinator: Matt Linehan (1st season)
- Offensive scheme: Pro spread
- Defensive coordinator: Cort Dennison (1st season)
- Base defense: 4–2–5
- Home stadium: Kibbie Dome

2025 Big Sky Conference football standings
	Conf.			Overall
Team	W		L	W		L
No. 1 Montana State $^	8	–	0	14	–	2
No. 3 Montana ^	7	–	1	13	–	2
No. 8 UC Davis ^	6	–	2	9	–	4
Sacramento State	5	–	3	7	–	5
Idaho State	5	–	3	6	–	6
Northern Arizona	4	–	4	7	–	5
Eastern Washington	4	–	4	5	–	7
Cal Poly	2	–	6	4	–	8
Idaho	2	–	6	4	–	8
Northern Colorado	2	–	6	4	–	8
Weber State	2	–	6	4	–	8
Portland State	1	–	7	1	–	11
$ – Conference champion; ^ – FCS playoff participant; Rankings from STATS Poll

The 2025 Idaho Vandals football team represented the University of Idaho as a member of the Big Sky Conference during the 2025 NCAA Division I FCS football season. The Vandals were led by first-year head coach Thomas Ford and played home games on campus at the Kibbie Dome in Moscow, Idaho.

After three consecutive appearances in the FCS playoffs under departed head coach Jason Eck, Idaho was ranked twelfth in the pre-season poll. The Vandals struggled and finished at 4–8 overall (2–6 in conference, eighth) and both coordinators were fired.

Hired in December 2024, Ford coached the running backs at Oregon State in 2024; he coached the running backs and special teams at Idaho under Eck in 2022 and 2023.

== Schedule ==
Date	Time	Opponent	Rank	Site	TV	Result	Attendance
August 30	7:00 p.m.	at Washington State*	No. 12	Martin Stadium; Pullman, WA (Battle of the Palouse)	The CW	L 10–13	28,243
September 6	1:00 p.m.	St. Thomas (MN)*	No. 10	Kibbie Dome; Moscow, ID	ESPN+	W 37–30	8,065
September 13	1:00 p.m.	Utah Tech*	No. 8	Kibbie Dome; Moscow, ID	ESPN+	W 20–6	7,681
September 20	2:00 p.m.	at San Jose State*	No. 8	CEFCU Stadium; San Jose, CA	NBCSBA	L 28–31	13,155
September 27	7:15 p.m.	at No. 5 Montana	No. 8	Washington–Grizzly Stadium; Missoula, MT (Little Brown Stein)	ESPN2	L 30–41	27,025
October 11	2:00 p.m.	Northern Colorado^{†}	No. 11	Kibbie Dome; Moscow, ID	ESPN+	L 33–49	12,902
October 18	4:00 p.m.	at Eastern Washington	No. 24	Roos Field; Cheney, WA	ESPN+	L 14–21	6,071
October 25	1:00 p.m.	Portland State		Kibbie Dome; Moscow, ID	ESPN+	W 45–6	7,040
October 31	7:30 p.m.	at No. 19 Northern Arizona		Walkup Skydome; Flagstaff, AZ	ESPN2	W 35–32 ^{OT}	5,112
November 8	4:00 p.m.	No. 11 UC Davis		Kibbie Dome; Moscow, ID	ESPN+	L 14–28	10,712
November 15	6:00 p.m.	at Sacramento State		Hornet Stadium; Sacramento, CA	ESPN+	L 20–23	15,467
November 22	1:00 p.m.	Idaho State		Kibbie Dome; Moscow, ID (rivalry)	ESPN+	L 16–37	7,428
*Non-conference game; ^{†}Homecoming; Rankings from STATS Poll released prior to the game; All times are in Pacific time

== Rankings ==
Ranking movements Legend: ██ Increase in ranking ██ Decrease in ranking — = Not ranked RV = Received votes
	Week														
Poll	Pre	1	2	3	4	5	6	7	8	9	10	11	12	13	Final
STATS	12	10	8	8	8	12	11	24	—	—	—	—	—	—	—
Coaches	12	11	10	8	10	15	13	RV	—	—	—	—	—	—	—

== Game summaries ==
=== at Washington State (FBS) (Battle of the Palouse) ===
No. 12 Idaho Vandals (0–0) at Washington State Cougars (FBS) (0–0) – Game summary

Quarter	1	2	3	4	Total
No. 12 Vandals	0	0	0	10	10
Cougars (FBS)	0	7	3	3	13

at Martin Stadium • Pullman, Washington

- Date: August 30
- Game time: 7:00 p.m.
- Game weather: Sunny • Temperature: 80 °F (27 °C)
- Game attendance: 28,243
- Referee: Chris Wiggins
- TV announcers (The CW): Rick Allen, Ryan Leaf and Nigel Burton

Game information

First quarter

- No scoring plays.

Second quarter

- WSU – Joshua Meredith 6-yard pass from Jaxon Potter (Jack Stevens kick), 11:30. Cougars 7–0. Drive: 8 plays, 73 yards, 3:46.

Third quarter

- WSU – Jack Stevens 30-yard field goal, 1:18. Cougars 10–0. Drive: 4 plays, 5 yards, 2:02.

Fourth quarter

- IDHO – Art Williams 3-yard run (Cameron Pope kick), 7:25. Cougars 10–7. Drive: 16 plays, 75 yards, 8:53.
- IDHO – Cameron Pope 21-yard field goal, 1:42. Tied 10–10. Drive: 4 plays, 7 yards, 0:39.
- WSU – Jack Stevens 32-yard field goal, 0:03. Cougars 13–10. Drive: 9 plays, 59 yards, 1:33.

Statistics	IDHO	WSU
First downs	16	13
Plays–yards	65–221	45–211
Rushes–yards	45–188	22–3
Passing yards	33	208
Passing: comp–att–int	12–20–0	23–31–0
Turnovers	2	1
Time of possession	35:11	24:49

Team	Category	Player	Statistics
Idaho	Passing	Joshua Wood	12/20, 33 yards
Idaho	Rushing	Joshua Wood	12 carries, 101 yards
Idaho	Receiving	Ryan Jezioro	3 receptions, 26 yards
Washington State	Passing	Jaxon Potter	23/30, 208 yards, TD
Washington State	Rushing	Kirby Vorhees	6 carries, 19 yards
Washington State	Receiving	Tony Freeman	7 receptions, 64 yards

=== St. Thomas (MN) ===
St. Thomas Tommies (1–0) at No. 10 Idaho Vandals (0–1) – Game summary

Quarter	1	2	3	4	Total
Tommies	7	6	3	14	30
No. 10 Vandals	3	20	0	14	37

at Kibbie Dome • Moscow, ID

- Date: September 6
- Game time: 1:00 PM PDT
- Game weather: Indoor • Temperature: 85 °F (29 °C)
- Game attendance: 8,540
- Referee: Jim Crowley
- TV announcers (ESPN+): Austin Getz (play-by-play) and Adam Shackleford (analyst)

Game information

First quarter

- IDHO - Cameron Pope 33-yard field goal, 5:13. Vandals 3-0. Drive: 11 plays, 64 yards, 6:34.
- STMN - Quentin Cobb-Butler 17-yard pass from Andy Peters (Elliot Huether kick), 0:57. Tommies 7-3. Drive: 8 plays, 65 yards, 4:16.

Second quarter

- IDHO - Rocco Koch 4-yard run (Cameron Pope kick), 11:40. Vandals 10-7. Drive: 8 plays, 68 yards, 4:08.
- STMN - Mariano Birdno 27-yard pass from Andy Peters (Two-point run conversion failed), 8:08. Tommies 13-10. Drive: 8 plays, 88 yards, 3:27.
- IDHO - Jake Cox 4-yard pass from Joshua Wood (Cameron Pope kick), 3:03. Vandals 17-13. Drive: 11 plays, 77 yards, 5:00.
- IDHO - Tony Harste 21-yard pass from Joshua Wood (Two-point run conversion failed), 0:16. Vandals 23-13. Drive: 6 plays, 38 yards, 1:40.

Third quarter

- STMN - Elliot Huether 44-yard field goal, 1:33. Vandals 23-16. Drive: 5 plays, 8 yards, 2:05.

Fourth quarter

- IDHO - Ryan Jezioro 42-yard pass from Joshua Wood (Cameron Pope PAT failed), 14:52. Vandals 29-16. Drive: 4 plays, 82 yards, 1:37.
- STMN - Patrick Bowen 38-yard run (Elliot Huether kick), 10:10. Vandals 29-23. Drive: 8 plays, 81 yards, 4:37.
- IDHO - Joshua Wood 59-yard run (Joshua Wood pass to Jake Cox for two-point conversion), 2:19. Vandals 37-23. Drive: 2 plays, 60 yards, 0:55.
- STMN - Patrick Wagner 6-yard pass from Andy Peters (Elliot Huether kick), 0:11. Vandals 37-30. Drive: 11 plays, 74 yards, 2:01.

Statistics	STMN	IDHO
First downs	26	22
Plays–yards	66–472	60–467
Rushes–yards	34–208	35–186
Passing yards	264	281
Passing: Comp–Att–Int	21-32-0	20-25-1
Turnovers	1	1
Time of possession	28:41	31:19

Team	Category	Player	Statistics
St. Thomas (MN)	Passing	Andy Peters	21/29, 264 yards, 3 TD
St. Thomas (MN)	Rushing	Andy Peters	11 carries, 79 yards
St. Thomas (MN)	Receiving	Patrick Wagner	6 receptions, 59 yards, TD
Idaho	Passing	Joshua Wood	20/25, 281 yards, 3 TD, INT
Idaho	Rushing	Joshua Wood	5 carries, 87 yards, TD
Idaho	Receiving	Tony Harste	5 receptions, 92 yards, TD

=== Utah Tech ===
Utah Tech Trailblazers (0–2) at No. 8 Idaho Vandals (1–1) – Game summary

Quarter	1	2	3	4	Total
Trailblazers	0	3	3	0	6
No. 8 Vandals	0	10	3	7	20

at Kibbie Dome • Moscow, ID

- Date: September 13
- Game time: 1:00 p.m. PDT
- Game weather: Indoor • Temperature: 75 °F (24 °C)
- Game attendance: 7,681
- Referee: Mike Bezner
- TV announcers (ESPN+): Austin Getz (play-by-play) and Adam Shackleford (analyst)

Game information

First quarter

- No scoring plays.

Second quarter

- IDHO - Ryan Jezioro 6-yard pass from Joshua Wood (Cameron Pope kick), 13:12. Vandals 7-0. Drive: 14 plays, 70 yards, 7:40.
- IDHO - Owen Forsman 24-yard field goal, 0:17. Vandals 10-0. Drive: 12 plays, 84 yards, 2:55.
- UTU - Ilya Uvaydov 55-yard field goal, 0:00. Vandals 10-3. Drive: 3 plays, 38 yards, 0:17.

Third quarter

- UTU - Ilya Uvaydov 53-yard field goal, 9:29. Vandals 10-6. Drive: 12 plays, 49 yards, 5:26.
- IDHO - Owen Forsman 49-yard field goal, 6:04. Vandals 13-6. Drive: 8 plays, 43 yards, 3:25.

Fourth quarter

- IDHO - Joshua Wood 18-yard run (Owen Forsman kick), 6:27. Vandals 20-6. Drive: 12 plays, 94 yards, 7:12.

Statistics	UTU	IDHO
First downs	15	26
Plays–yards	54–247	71–405
Rushes–yards	25–98	46–286
Passing yards	149	119
Passing: Comp–Att–Int	17-29-1	14-25-0
Turnovers	1	0
Time of possession	25:14	34:46

Team	Category	Player	Statistics
Utah Tech	Passing	Bronson Barben	12/20, 111 yards
Utah Tech	Rushing	Reggie Graff	7 carries, 45 yards
Utah Tech	Receiving	Eric Olsen	5 receptions, 45 yards
Idaho	Passing	Joshua Wood	14/25, 119 yards, TD
Idaho	Rushing	Art Williams	16 carries, 144 yards
Idaho	Receiving	Ryan Jezioro	5 receptions, 50 yards, TD

=== at San Jose State (FBS) ===
No. 8 Idaho Vandals (2–1) at San Jose State Spartans (FBS) (0–2) – Game summary

Quarter	1	2	3	4	Total
No. 8 Vandals	7	7	7	7	28
Spartans (FBS)	0	14	7	10	31

at CEFCU Stadium • San Jose, CA

- Date: September 20
- Game time: 2:00 PM PDT
- Game weather: Sunny • Temperature: 83 °F (28 °C)
- Game attendance: 13,155
- Referee: Kenneth Ray
- TV announcers (NBCSBA): Larry Beil (play-by-play), David Fales (analyst) and Lindsey Pallares (sideline reporter)

Game information

First Quarter

- IDHO - Joshua Wood 1-yard run (Owen Forsman kick), 7:03. Vandals 7-0. Drive: 11 plays, 54 yards, 6:06.

Second Quarter

- IDHO - Art Williams 1-yard run (Owen Forsman kick), 7:12. Vandals 14-0. Drive: 15 plays, 85 yards, 8:50.
- SJSU - Jabari Bates 87-yard run (Denis Lynch kick), 6:53. Vandals 14-7. Drive: 1 play, 87 yards, 0:13.
- SJSU - Kyri Shoels 15-yard pass from Walker Eget (Denis Lynch kick), 1:55. Tied 14-14. Drive: 7 plays, 80 yards, 4:01.

Third Quarter

- IDHO - Ryan Jezioro 15-yard pass from Joshua Wood (Owen Forsman kick), 5:11. Vandals 21-14. Drive: 15 plays, 74 yards, 9:46.
- SJSU - Floyd Chalk IV 7-yard run (Denis Lynch kick), 1:51. Tied 21-21. Drive: 8 plays, 75 yards, 3:20.

Fourth Quarter

- IDHO - Noah West-Baranco 18-yard pass from Joshua Wood (Owen Forsman kick), 9:17. Vandals 28-21. Drive: 11 plays, 57 yards, 7:27.
- SJSU - Floyd Chalk IV 1-yard run (Denis Lynch kick), 5:21. Tied 28-28. Drive: 7 plays, 68 yards, 3:50.
- SJSU - Denis Lynch 48-yard field goal, 0:08. Spartans 31-28. Drive: 8 plays, 31 yards, 3:15.

Statistics	IDHO	SJSU
First downs	22	15
Plays–yards	75–384	47–420
Rushes–yards	43–152	26–198
Passing yards	232	222
Passing: Comp–Att–Int	18–32–0	13–21–0
Turnovers	1	1
Time of possession	39:01	20:59

Team	Category	Player	Statistics
Idaho	Passing	Joshua Wood	18/32, 232 yards, 2 TD
Idaho	Rushing	Art Williams	18 carries, 65 yards, TD
Idaho	Receiving	Emmerson Cortez-Menjivar	5 receptions, 84 yards
San Jose State	Passing	Walker Eget	13/21, 222 yards, TD
San Jose State	Rushing	Jabari Bates	11 carries, 131 yards, TD
San Jose State	Receiving	Danny Scudero	6 receptions, 130 yards

=== at No. 5 Montana (Little Brown Stein) ===
No. 8 Idaho Vandals (2–2) at No. 5 Montana Grizzlies (3–0) – Game summary

Quarter	1	2	3	4	Total
No. 8 Vandals	0	6	8	16	30
No. 5 Grizziles	10	7	14	10	41

at Washington–Grizzly Stadium • Missoula, MT

- Date: September 27
- Game time: 7:15 p.m. PDT
- Game weather: Sunny • Temperature: 67 °F (19 °C)
- Game attendance: 27,025
- Referee: Jeff Rink
- TV announcers (ESPN2): Clay Matvick (play-by-play) and Chase Daniel (analyst)

Game information

First quarter

- MONT - Ty Morrison 37-yard field goal, 11:11. Grizzlies 3-0. Drive: 8 plays, 55 yards, 3:49.
- MONT - Eli Gillman 2-yard run (Ty Morrison kick), 4:37. Grizzlies 10-0. Drive: 4 plays, 23 yards, 1:19.

Second quarter

- IDHO - Owen Adams 31-yard field goal, 13:22. Grizzlies 10-3. Drive: 12 plays, 61 yards, 6:15.
- MONT - Michael Wortham 11-yard run (Ty Morrison kick), 7:02. Grizzlies 17-3. Drive: 6 plays, 48 yards, 2:51.
- IDHO - Owen Adams 41-yard field goal, 2:55. Grizzlies 17-6. Drive: 9 plays, 51 yards, 4:07.

Third quarter

- MONT - Michael Wortham 22-yard pass from Keali'i Ah Yat (Ty Morrison kick), 9:22. Grizzlies 24-6. Drive: 7 plays, 65 yards, 3:33.
- IDHO - Joshua Wood 8-yard run (Emmerson Cortez-Menjivar pass for two-point conversion), 3:43. Grizzlies 24-14. Drive: 7 plays, 86 yards, 2:35.
- MONT - Eli Gillman 6-yard run (Ty Morrison kick), 0:38. Grizzlies 31-14. Drive: 5 plays, 50 yards, 2:54.

Fourth quarter

- IDHO - Joshua Wood 4-yard run (Joshua Wood pass to Nate Thomas for two-point conversion), 13:31. Grizzlies 31-22. Drive: 5 plays, 79 yards, 2:01.
- MONT - Keali'i Ah Yat 1-yard run (Ty Morrison kick), 7:49. Grizzlies 38-22. Drive: 11 plays, 79 yards, 5:37.
- MONT - Ty Morrison 26-yard field goal, 1:56. Grizzlies 41-22. Drive: 8 plays, 31 yards, 5:14.
- IDHO - Joshua Wood 1-yard run (Joshua Wood pass to Hayden Kincheloe for two-point conversion), 0:19. Grizzlies 41-30. Drive: 7 plays, 75 yards, 1:37.

Statistics	IDHO	MONT
First downs	15	22
Plays–yards	62–370	67–413
Rushes–yards	34–108	44–190
Passing yards	262	223
Passing: Comp–Att–Int	14–28–0	17–23–0
Turnovers	1	0
Time of possession	26:13	33:47

Team	Category	Player	Statistics
Idaho	Passing	Joshua Wood	14/28, 262 yards
Idaho	Rushing	Nate Thomas	19 carries, 70 yards
Idaho	Receiving	Ryan Jezioro	4 receptions, 102 yards
Montana	Passing	Keali'i Ah Yat	17/23, 223 yards, TD
Montana	Rushing	Eli Gillman	27 carries, 142 yards, 2 TD
Montana	Receiving	Drew Deck	5 receptions, 67 yards

=== Northern Colorado ===
Northern Colorado Bears (2–3) at No. 11 Idaho Vandals (2–3) – Game summary

Quarter	1	2	3	4	Total
Bears	13	22	0	14	49
No. 11 Vandals	7	10	8	8	33

at Kibbie Dome • Moscow, ID

- Date: October 11
- Game time: 2:00 p.m. PDT
- Game weather: Indoor • Temperature: 75 °F (24 °C)
- Game attendance: 12,902
- Referee: Gregg Wilson
- TV announcers (ESPN+): Greg Heister (play-by-play) and Adam Shackleford (analyst)

Game information

First quarter

- UNCO - Mathias Price 1-yard run (Jacob Willig kick), 9:57. Bears 7-0. Drive: 11 plays, 75 yards, 5:03.
- UNCO - Jacob Willig 52-yard field goal, 8:44. Bears 10-0. Drive: 5 plays, -3 yards, 0:58.
- IDHO - Elisha Cummings 39-yard pass from Jack Wagner (Owen Adams kick), 5:18. Bears 10-7. Drive: 6 plays, 75 yards, 3:26.
- UNCO - Jacob Willig 43-yard field goal, 2:35. Bears 13-7. Drive: 7 plays, 46 yards, 2:38.

Second quarter

- UNCO - Mathias Price 7-yard pass from Eric Gibson Jr. (Eric Gibson Jr. pass to Brayden Munroe for two-point conversion), 13:13. Bears 21-7. Drive: 7 plays, 53 yards, 2:26.
- IDHO - Rocco Koch 12-yard run (Owen Adams kick), 7:50. Bears 21-14. Drive: 11 plays, 75 yards, 5:23.
- UNCO - Brayden Monroe 22-yard pass from Eric Gibson Jr. (Jacob Willig kick), 3:19. Bears 28-14. Drive: 5 plays, 40 yards, 1:14.
- IDHO - Owen Adams 38-yard field goal, 0:40. Bears 28-17. Drive: 9 plays, 54 yards, 2:39.
- UNCO - Kieryus Boone 10-yard run (Jacob Willig kick), 0:13. Bears 35-17. Drive: 4 plays, 75 yards, 0:27.

Third quarter

- IDHO - Rocco Koch 16-yard run (Rocco Koch run for two-point conversion), 7:23. Bears 35-25. Drive: 15 plays, 75 yards, 7:37.

Fourth quarter

- UNCO - Carver Cheeks 0-yard run (Jacob Willig kick), 12:58. Bears 42-25. Drive: 8 plays, 55 yards, 2:56.
- IDHO - Nate Thomas 10-yard run (Jack Wagner pass to Nolan McWilliams for two-point conversion), 7:49. Bears 42-33. Drive: 13 plays, 75 yards, 5:09.
- UNCO - Brandon Johnson 18-yard run (Jacob Willig kick), 4:32. Bears 49-33. Drive: 5 plays, 62 yards, 3:17.

Statistics	UNCO	IDHO
First downs	23	27
Plays–yards	65–482	76–440
Rushes–yards	30–132	43–203
Passing yards	350	237
Passing: Comp–Att–Int	22-35-0	21-33-2
Turnovers	0	3
Time of possession	25:47	34:13

Team	Category	Player	Statistics
Northern Colorado	Passing	Eric Gibson Jr.	22/34, 350 yards, 2 TD
Northern Colorado	Rushing	Brandon Johnson	5 carries, 36 yards, TD
Northern Colorado	Receiving	Brayden Munroe	5 receptions, 151 yards, TD
Idaho	Passing	Jack Wagner	21/33, 237 yards, TD, 2 INT
Idaho	Rushing	Rocco Koch	10 carries, 81 yards, 2 TD
Idaho	Receiving	Elisha Cummings	5 receptions, 67 yards, TD

=== at Eastern Washington ===
No. 24 Idaho Vandals (2–4) at Eastern Washington Eagles (2–4) – Game summary

Quarter	1	2	3	4	Total
No. 24 Vandals	7	0	0	7	14
Eagles	3	10	0	8	21

at Roos Field • Cheney, WA

- Date: October 18
- Game time: 4:00 p.m. PDT
- Game weather: Cloudy • Temperature: 53 °F (12 °C)
- Game attendance: 6,071
- Referee: Mike Bezner
- TV announcers (ESPN+): Austin Getz (play-by-play) and Bill Ames (analyst)

Game information

First quarter

- EWU - Soren McKee 31-yard field goal, 4:18. Eagles 3-0. Drive: 9 plays, 37 yards, 2:15.
- IDHO - Marquawn McCraney 26-yard pass from Jack Wagner (Owen Adams kick), 1:11. Vandals 7-3. Drive: 6 plays, 75 yards, 3:07.

Second quarter

- EWU - Soren McKee 39-yard field goal, 1:31. Vandals 7-6. Drive: 14 plays, 36 yards, 6:26.
- EWU - Miles Williams 9-yard pass from Nate Bell (Soren McKee kick), 0:44. Eagles 13-7. Drive: 3 plays, 32 yards, 0:18.

Third quarter

- No scoring plays.

Fourth quarter

- EWU - Miles Williams 6-yard pass from Nate Bell (Jaxon Branch pass for two-point conversion), 14:12. Eagles 21-7. Drive: 8 plays, 93 yards, 3:08.
- IDHO - Michael Graves 40-yard pass from Nick Josifek (Owen Adams kick), 2:30. Eagles 21-14. Drive: 7 plays, 80 yards, 1:32.

Statistics	IDHO	EWU
First downs	17	14
Plays–yards	73–338	67–305
Rushes–yards	41–147	36–128
Passing yards	191	177
Passing: Comp–Att–Int	14–32–1	18–31–1
Turnovers	1	2
Time of possession	30:41	29:19

Team	Category	Player	Statistics
Idaho	Passing	Nick Josifek	6/13, 104 yards, TD
Idaho	Rushing	Rocco Koch	14 carries, 81 yards
Idaho	Receiving	Marquawn McCraney	7 receptions, 105 yards, TD
Eastern Washington	Passing	Nate Bell	18/31, 177 yards, 2 TD, INT
Eastern Washington	Rushing	Nate Bell	23 carries, 134 yards
Eastern Washington	Receiving	Miles Williams	4 receptions, 40 yards, 2 TD

=== Portland State ===
Portland State Vikings (0–7) at Idaho Vandals (2–5) – Game summary

Quarter	1	2	3	4	Total
Vikings	3	3	0	0	6
Vandals	7	21	14	3	45

at Kibbie Dome • Moscow, ID

- Date: October 25
- Game time: 1:00 p.m. PDT
- Game weather: Indoor • Temperature: 50 °F (10 °C)
- Game attendance: 7,040
- Referee: Jeff Rink
- TV announcers (ESPN+): Austin Getz (play-by-play) and Adam Shackleford (analyst)

Game information

First quarter

- PRST - Mathias Uribe 27-yard field goal, 3:55. Vikings 3-0. Drive: 15 plays, 60 yards, 7:22.
- IDHO - Elisha Cummings 64-yard pass from Joshua Wood (Owen Adams kick), 2:49. Vandals 7-3. Drive: 2 plays, 73 yards, 0:59.

Second quarter

- IDHO - Noah West-Baranco 48-yard pass from Joshua Wood (Owen Adams kick), 12:07. Vandals 14-3. Drive: 2 plays, 59 yards, 0:49.
- PRST - Mathias Uribe 40-yard field goal, 8:38. Vandals 14-6. Drive: 6 plays, 52 yards, 3:29.
- IDHO - Marquawn McCraney 24-yard pass from Joshua Wood (Owen Adams kick), 4:57. Vandals 21-6. Drive: 8 plays, 69 yards, 3:35.
- IDHO - Emmerson Cortez-Menjivar 6-yard pass from Joshua Wood (Owen Adams kick), 0:17. Vandals 28-6. Drive: 9 plays, 77 yards, 2:04.

Third quarter

- IDHO - Jake Cox 42-yard pass from Rocco Koch (Owen Adams kick), 12:47. Vandals 35-6. Drive: 4 plays, 75 yards, 2:13.
- IDHO - Elisha Cummings 13-yard run (Owen Adams kick), 6:51. Vandals 42-6. Drive: 8 plays, 44 yards, 4:55.

Fourth quarter

- IDHO - Owen Adams 44-yard field goal, 11:38. Vandals 45-6. Drive: 5 plays, 10 yards, 3:22.

Statistics	PRST	IDHO
First downs	16	22
Plays–yards	62–317	55–464
Rushes–yards	35–135	28–163
Passing yards	182	301
Passing: Comp–Att–Int	14-27-2	18-27-0
Turnovers	2	0
Time of possession	31:48	28:12

Team	Category	Player	Statistics
Portland State	Passing	Tyrese Smith	7/13, 141 yards, INT
Portland State	Rushing	Tyrese Smith	9 carries, 42 yards
Portland State	Receiving	Terence Loville	2 receptions, 59 yards
Idaho	Passing	Joshua Wood	15/22, 259 yards, 4 TD
Idaho	Rushing	Elisha Cummings	8 carries, 65 yards, TD
Idaho	Receiving	Elisha Cummings	4 receptions, 100 yards, TD

=== at No. 19 Northern Arizona ===
Idaho Vandals (3–5) at No. 19 Northern Arizona Lumberjacks (5–3) – Game summary

Quarter	1	2	3	4	OT	Total
Vandals	0	19	7	3	6	35
No. 19 Lumberjacks	7	0	7	15	3	32

at Walkup Skydome • Flagstaff, AZ

- Date: October 31
- Game time: 7:30 PM MST
- Game weather: Indoor
- Game attendance: 5,112
- Referee: Robert Quello
- TV announcers (ESPN2): Courtney Lyle (play-by-play) and Rene Ingoglia (analyst)

Game information

First quarter

- NAU - Ryan Fontaine 20-yard punt return (Samuel Hunsaker kick), 1:59. Lumberjacks 7-0. Drive: 5 plays, 13 yards, 2:41.

Second quarter

- IDHO - Ryan Jezioro 3-yard pass from Joshua Wood (Owen Adams PAT blocked), 12:43. Lumberjacks 7-6. Drive: 8 plays, 75 yards, 4:16.
- IDHO - Elisha Cummings 25-yard pass from Joshua Wood (two-point pass conversion failed), 4:13. Vandals 12-7. Drive: 5 plays, 73 yards, 2:48.
- IDHO - Elisha Cummings 22-yard run (Owen Adams kick), 0:28. Vandals 19-7. Drive: 6 plays, 48 yards, 2:09.

Third quarter

- IDHO - Cruz Hepburn 63-yard fumble recovery (Owen Adams kick), 9:04. Vandals 26-7. Drive: 5 plays, -27 yards, 1:57.
- NAU - Quran Gossett 1-yard run (Samuel Hunsaker kick), 5:06. Vandals 26-14. Drive: 9 plays, 75 yards, 3:58.

Fourth quarter

- NAU - Kolbe Katsis 57-yard pass from Ty Pennington (Samuel Hunsaker kick), 13:56. Vandals 26-21. Drive: 5 plays, 80 yards, 1:56.
- NAU - Kolbe Katsis 28-yard run (Ty Pennington pass to Joey Stout for two-point conversion), 8:28. Lumberjacks 29-26. Drive: 7 plays, 85 yards, 3:27.
- IDHO - Owen Adams 42-yard field goal, 0:00. Tied 29-29. Drive: 13 plays, 51 yards, 4:06.

Overtime

- NAU - Samuel Hunsaker 38-yard field goal. Lumberjacks 32-29. Drive: 9 plays, 4 yards.
- IDHO - Hayden Kincheloe 1-yard run. Vandals 35-32. Drive: 2 plays, 25 yards.

Statistics	IDHO	NAU
First downs	21	19
Plays–yards	67–393	70–413
Rushes–yards	36–213	36–146
Passing yards	180	267
Passing: Comp–Att–Int	15–31–1	23–34–0
Turnovers	1	1
Time of possession	29:24	30:36

Team	Category	Player	Statistics
Idaho	Passing	Joshua Wood	15/31, 180 yards, 2 TD, INT
Idaho	Rushing	Elisha Cummings	12 carries, 106 yards, TD
Idaho	Receiving	Elisha Cummings	5 receptions, 78 yards, TD
Northern Arizona	Passing	Ty Pennington	23/34, 267 yards, TD
Northern Arizona	Rushing	Seth Cromwell	18 carries, 116 yards
Northern Arizona	Receiving	Kolbe Katsis	5 receptions, 98 yards, TD

=== No. 11 UC Davis ===
No. 11 UC Davis Aggies (6–2) at Idaho Vandals (4–5) – Game summary

Quarter	1	2	3	4	Total
No. 11 Aggies	14	7	7	0	28
Vandals	0	7	0	7	14

at Kibbie Dome • Moscow, ID

- Date: November 8
- Game time: 4:00 p.m. PST
- Game weather: Sunny
- Game attendance: 10,712
- Referee: Kelly Holman
- TV announcers (ESPN+): Austin Getz (play-by-play) and Brian Strandley (analyst)

Game information

First quarter

- UCD - Ian Simpson 11-yard pass from Caden Pinnick (Hunter Ridley kick), 10:25. Aggies 7-0. Drive: 5 plays, 66 yards, 2:23.
- UCD - Samuel Gbatu Jr. 8-yard pass from Caden Pinnick (Hunter Ridley kick), 4:20. Aggies 14-0. Drive: 9 plays, 70 yards, 3:47.

Second quarter

- IDHO - Michael Graves 68-yard pass from Joshua Wood (Owen Forsman kick), 14:49. Aggies 14-7. Drive: 2 plays, 75 yards, 0:44.
- UCD - Caden Pinnick 22-yard run (Hunter Ridley kick), 2:17. Aggies 21-7. Drive: 10 plays, 94 yards, 4:00.

Third quarter

- UCD - Stacy Dobbins 3-yard pass from Caden Pinnick (Hunter Ridley kick), 8:29. Aggies 28-7. Drive: 5 plays, 44 yards, 1:57.

Fourth quarter

- IDHO - Michael Graves 35-yard pass from Joshua Wood (Owen Forsman kick), 11:35. Aggies 28-14. Drive: 5 plays, 94 yards, 1:43.

Statistics	UCD	IDHO
First downs	25	18
Plays–yards	68–448	65–430
Rushes–yards	41–200	26–133
Passing yards	248	297
Passing: Comp–Att–Int	21-27-2	20-39-1
Turnovers	2	2
Time of possession	32:03	27:57

Team	Category	Player	Statistics
UC Davis	Passing	Caden Pinnick	21/27, 248 yards, 3 TD, 2 INT
UC Davis	Rushing	Jordan Fisher	21 carries, 103 yards
UC Davis	Receiving	Samuel Gbatu Jr.	7 receptions, 110 yards, TD
Idaho	Passing	Joshua Wood	20/38, 297 yards, 2 TD, INT
Idaho	Rushing	Elisha Cummings	10 carries, 52 yards
Idaho	Receiving	Michael Graves	3 receptions, 112 yards, 2 TD

=== at Sacramento State ===
Idaho Vandals (4–6) at Sacramento State Hornets (6–4) – Game summary

Quarter	1	2	3	4	Total
Vandals	0	3	3	14	20
Hornets	3	3	10	7	23

at Hornet Stadium • Sacramento, CA

- Date: November 15
- Game time: 6:00 p.m. PST
- Game weather: Sunny • Temperature: 61 °F (16 °C) • Wind: SE at 5 miles per hour (8.0 km/h)
- Game attendance: 15,467
- Referee: Gregg Wilson
- TV announcers (ESPN+): Jason Ross (play-by-play) and Darren Arbet (analyst)

Game information

First quarter

- SAC - Grant Meadors 30-yard field goal, 8:03. Hornets 3-0. Drive: 13 plays, 55 yards, 6:50.

Second quarter

- SAC - Grant Meadors 38-yard field goal, 5:30. Hornets 6-0. Drive: 8 plays, 58 yards, 3:44.
- IDHO - Owen Forsman 21-yard field goal, 1:20. Hornets 6-3. Drive: 10 plays, 71 yards, 4:10.

Third quarter

- SAC - Ernest Campbell 26-yard pass from Cardell Williams (Grant Meadors kick), 10:27. Hornets 13-3. Drive: 5 plays, 45 yards, 2:05.
- IDHO - Owen Forsman 22-yard field goal, 6:35. Hornets 13-6. Drive: 10 plays, 60 yards, 3:52.
- SAC - Grant Meadors 31-yard field goal, 1:37. Hornets 16-6. Drive: 11 plays, 62 yards, 4:55.

Fourth quarter

- IDHO - Nate Thomas 7-yard run (Owen Forsman kick), 13:37. Hornets 16-13. Drive: 8 plays, 75 yards, 2:58.
- IDHO - Joshua Wood 10-yard run (Owen Forsman kick), 3:17. Vandals 20-16. Drive: 11 plays, 91 yards, 6:18.
- SAC - Cardell Williams 2-yard run (Grant Meadors kick), 0:09. Hornets 23-20. Drive: 14 plays, 67 yards, 3:05.

Statistics	IDHO	SAC
First downs	19	25
Plays–yards	55–355	76–458
Rushes–yards	29–193	58–282
Passing yards	162	176
Passing: Comp–Att–Int	15–26–1	14–18–0
Turnovers	1	0
Time of possession	26:46	33:14

Team	Category	Player	Statistics
Idaho	Passing	Joshua Wood	15/26, 162 yards, INT
Idaho	Rushing	Joshua Wood	14 carries, 117 yards, TD
Idaho	Receiving	Nolan McWilliams	2 receptions, 49 yards
Sacramento State	Passing	Cardell Williams	14/18, 176 yards, TD
Sacramento State	Rushing	JaQuail Smith	14 carries, 122 yards
Sacramento State	Receiving	Ernest Campbell	6 receptions, 61 yards, TD

=== Idaho State (rivalry) ===
Idaho State Bengals (5–6) at Idaho Vandals (4–7) – Game summary

Quarter	1	2	3	4	Total
Bengals	10	17	0	10	37
Vandals	0	0	8	8	16

at Kibbie Dome • Moscow, ID

- Date: November 21
- Game time: 1 p.m. PST
- Game weather: Indoor • Temperature: 75 °F (24 °C)
- Game attendance: 7,428
- Referee: Jeff Rink
- TV announcers (ESPN+): Noah Schmick (play-by-play) and Darren Arbet (analyst)

Game information

First quarter

- IDST - Trajan Sinatra 39-yard field goal, 10:17. Bengals 3-0. Drive: 12 plays, 53 yards, 4:43.
- IDST - Ian Duarte 14-yard pass from Jordan Cooke (Trajan Sinatra kick), 0:50. Bengals 10-0. Drive: 7 plays, 42 yards, 2:28.

Second quarter

- IDST - Jordan Cooke 1-yard run (Trajan Sinatra kick), 6:01. Bengals 17-0. Drive: 6 plays, 57 yards, 2:37.
- IDST - Tsion Nunally 30-yard pass from Jordan Cooke (Trajan Sinatra kick), 0:28. Bengals 24-0. Drive: 9 plays, 84 yards, 1:46.
- IDST - Trajan Sinatra 33-yard field goal, 0:00. Bengals 27-0. Drive: 4 plays, 49 yards, 0:25.

Third quarter

- IDHO - Nate Thomas 16-yard run (Rocco Koch run for two-point conversion), 3:36. Bengals 27-8. Drive: 5 plays, 61 yards, 3:23.

Fourth quarter

- IDST - Jordan Cooke 9-yard run (Trajan Sinatra kick), 11:47. Bengals 34-8. Drive: 15 plays, 75 yards, 6:49.
- IDST - Trajan Sinatra 19-yard field goal, 7:06. Bengals 37-8. Drive: 4 plays, 7 yards, 2:20.
- IDHO - Nolan McWilliams 21-yard pass from Sawyer Teeney (Sawyer Teeney pass from to Carlos Matheny for two-point conversion), 1:57. Bengals 37-16. Drive: 8 plays, 75 yards, 5:09.

Statistics	IDST	IDHO
First downs	24	13
Plays–yards	77–404	51–259
Rushes–yards	44–192	26–133
Passing yards	212	126
Passing: Comp–Att–Int	20-33-0	17-25-1
Turnovers	0	1
Time of possession	33:04	26:56

Team	Category	Player	Statistics
Idaho State	Passing	Jordan Cooke	20/33, 212 yards, 2 TD
Idaho State	Rushing	Dason Brooks	23 carries, 103 yards
Idaho State	Receiving	Tsion Nunally	6 receptions, 86 yards, TD
Idaho	Passing	Joshua Wood	9/13, 73 yards, INT
Idaho	Rushing	Nate Thomas	15 carries, 66 yards, TD
Idaho	Receiving	Nolan McWilliams	5 receptions, 49 yards, TD
