= 2025 Montana Grizzlies football team =

American college football season

2025 Montana Grizzlies football

NCAA Division I Semifinal, L 23–48 at Montana State
- Conference: Big Sky Conference

Ranking
- STATS: No. 3
- FCS Coaches: No. 3
- Record: 13–2 (7–1 Big Sky)
- Head coach: Bobby Hauck (15th season)
- Offensive coordinator: Brent Pease (3rd season)
- Offensive scheme: Multiple
- Co-defensive coordinators: Roger Cooper (2nd season); Tim Hauck (2nd season)
- Base defense: 3–3–5
- Home stadium: Washington–Grizzly Stadium

2025 Big Sky Conference football standings
	Conf.			Overall
Team	W		L	W		L
No. 1 Montana State $^	8	–	0	14	–	2
No. 3 Montana ^	7	–	1	13	–	2
No. 8 UC Davis ^	6	–	2	9	–	4
Sacramento State	5	–	3	7	–	5
Idaho State	5	–	3	6	–	6
Northern Arizona	4	–	4	7	–	5
Eastern Washington	4	–	4	5	–	7
Cal Poly	2	–	6	4	–	8
Idaho	2	–	6	4	–	8
Northern Colorado	2	–	6	4	–	8
Weber State	2	–	6	4	–	8
Portland State	1	–	7	1	–	11
$ – Conference champion; ^ – FCS playoff participant; Rankings from STATS Poll

The 2025 Montana Grizzlies football team represented the University of Montana as a member of the Big Sky Conference during the 2025 NCAA Division I FCS football season. The Grizzlies were led by head coach Bobby Hauck in the eighth season of his current stint and the fifteenth overall, as he was head coach from 2003 to 2009. The team played at Washington–Grizzly Stadium in Missoula, Montana. The Grizzlies were 11–0 heading into the rivalry game with Montana State but were defeated 31–28 at home to close out the regular season. Earning a first round bye, they defeated South Dakota State and South Dakota to reach the Semifinals against Montana State in the first-ever postseason edition of the rivalry (and the first time the rivalry game had been played twice in one year since 1913) but were soundly defeated 43–28 to end their season.

The Montana Grizzlies drew an average home attendance of 26,464, the second-highest of all NCAA Division I FCS football teams.

== Schedule ==
Date	Time	Opponent	Rank	Site	TV	Result	Attendance
September 6	6:00 p.m.	No. 18 (Div. II) Central Washington*	No. 6	Washington–Grizzly Stadium; Missoula, MT	ESPN+	W 42–17	26,309
September 13	1:00 p.m.	No. 16 North Dakota*	No. 5	Washington–Grizzly Stadium; Missoula, MT	ESPN+	W 24–23	26,492
September 20	1:00 p.m.	Indiana State*	No. 5	Washington–Grizzly Stadium; Missoula, MT	ESPN+	W 63–20	26,193
September 27	8:15 p.m.	No. 8 Idaho	No. 5	Washington–Grizzly Stadium; Missoula, MT (Little Brown Stein)	ESPN2	W 41–30	27,025
October 4	6:00 p.m.	at Idaho State	No. 4	ICCU Dome; Pocatello, ID	ESPN+	W 42–38	7,674
October 11	2:00 p.m.	Cal Poly^{†}	No. 4	Washington–Grizzly Stadium; Missoula, MT	ESPN+	W 28–9	26,347
October 18	1:00 p.m.	Sacred Heart*	No. 4	Washington–Grizzly Stadium; Missoula, MT	ESPN+	W 43–21	26,147
October 24	7:30 p.m.	at Sacramento State	No. 4	Hornet Stadium; Sacramento, CA	ESPN2	W 49–35	16,816
November 1	1:00 p.m.	at Weber State	No. 3	Stewart Stadium; Ogden, UT	ESPN+	W 38–17	5,095
November 8	1:00 p.m.	Eastern Washington	No. 2	Washington–Grizzly Stadium; Missoula, MT (EWU–UM Governors Cup)	ESPN+	W 29–24	25,861
November 15	3:00 p.m.	at Portland State	No. 2	Providence Park; Portland, OR	ESPN+	W 63–17	9,075
November 22	12:00 p.m.	No. 3 Montana State	No. 2	Washington–Grizzly Stadium; Missoula, MT (rivalry)	ESPN+	L 28–31	27,340
December 6	12:00 p.m.	No. 16 South Dakota State*	No. 3	Washington–Grizzly Stadium; Missoula, MT (NCAA Division I Second Round)	ESPN+	W 50–29	18,197
December 13	1:30 p.m.	No. 12 South Dakota*	No. 3	Washington–Grizzly Stadium; Missoula, MT (NCAA Division I Quarterfinal)	ABC	W 52–22	22,725
December 20	2:00 p.m.	at No. 2 Montana State*	No. 3	Bobcat Stadium; Bozeman, MT (NCAA Division I Semifinal)	ABC	L 23–48	25,437
*Non-conference game; ^{†}Homecoming; Rankings from STATS Poll released prior to the game; All times are in Mountain time

== Game summaries ==
=== No. 18 (DII) Central Washington ===
No. 18 (DII) Central Washington Wildcats (1–0) at No. 6 Montana Grizzlies (0–0) – Game summary

Quarter	1	2	3	4	Total
No. 18 (DII) Wildcats	3	14	0	0	17
No. 6 Grizziles	14	7	14	7	42

at Washington–Grizzly Stadium • Missoula, Montana

- Date: September 6
- Game time: 6:00 p.m.
- Game weather: Sunny • Temperature: 84 °F (29 °C) • Wind: W at 3 miles per hour (4.8 km/h)
- Game attendance: 26,309
- Referee: Rob Quello
- TV: ESPN+

Game information

First quarter

- (13:50) MONT – Eli Gillman 54-yard run, Ty Morrison kick (Drive: 3 plays, 75 yards, 1:05; Montana 7–0)
- (6:18) CWU – David Weber 44-yard field goal (Drive: 5 plays, 28 yards, 2:48; Montana 7–3)
- (1:21) MONT – Stevie Rocker Jr. 5-yard run, Ty Morrison kick (Drive: 11 plays, 85 yards, 4:51; Montana 14–3)

Second quarter

- (12:26) CWU – Camden Loidhamer 15-yard pass from Kennedy McGill, David Weber kick (Drive: 8 plays, 75 yards, 3:55; Montana 14–10)
- (3:54) CWU – Beau Phillips 31-yard run, David Weber kick (Drive: 9 plays, 80 yards, 5:28; Central Washington 17–14)
- (2:29) MONT – Drew Deck 50-yard pass from Keali'i Ah Yat, Ty Morrison kick (Drive: 4 plays, 75 yards, 1:25; Montana 21–17)

Third quarter

- (8:25) MONT – Michael Wortham 76-yard pass from Keali'i Ah Yat, Ty Morrison kick (Drive: 2 plays, 80 yards, 0:44; Montana 28–17)
- (2:57) MONT – Eli Gillman 11-yard run, Ty Morrison kick (Drive: 9 plays, 80 yards, 3:49; Montana 35–17)

Fourth quarter

- (7:53) MONT – Eli Gillman 1-yard run, Ty Morrison kick (Drive: 5 plays, 65 yards, 2:26; Montana 42–17)

Statistics	CWU	MONT
First downs	21	20
Plays–yards	64–329	60–567
Rushes–yards	44–221	35–310
Passing yards	108	257
Passing: Comp–Att–Int	9–20–2	15–25–2
Turnovers	2	3
Time of possession	36:08	23:51

Team	Category	Player	Statistics
Central Washington	Passing	Kennedy McGill	7/16, 76 yards, TD, 2 INT
Central Washington	Rushing	Beau Phillips	11 carries, 69 yards, TD
Central Washington	Receiving	Jalen Grable	3 receptions, 43 yards
Montana	Passing	Keali'i Ah Yat	14/24, 250 yards, 2 TD, 2 INT
Montana	Rushing	Eli Gillman	15 carries, 198 yards, 3 TD
Montana	Receiving	Michael Wortham	6 receptions, 120 yards, TD

=== No. 16 North Dakota ===
No. 16 North Dakota Fighting Hawks (1–1) at No. 5 Montana Grizzlies (1–0) – Game summary

Quarter	1	2	3	4	Total
No. 16 Fighting Hawks	13	3	0	7	23
No. 5 Grizzlies	7	0	7	10	24

at Washington–Grizzly Stadium • Missoula, MT

- Date: September 13
- Game time: 1:00 p.m.
- Game weather: Sunny • Temperature: 72 °F (22 °C)
- Game attendance: 26,492
- Referee: Gregg Wilson
- TV announcers (ESPN+): Trey Bender (play-by-play), Jordan Tripp (analyst) and Kyle Hansen (sideline)

Game information

First quarter

- (8:07) UND – B.J. Fleming 82-yard pass from Jerry Kaminski, C.J. Elrichs kick failed (Drive: 2 plays, 84 yards, 0:47; North Dakota 6–0)
- (3:24) UND – Deng Deng 10-yard pass from Jerry Kaminski, C.J. Elrichs kick (Drive: 9 plays, 74 yards, 2:54; North Dakota 13–0)
- (0:51) MONT – Stevie Rocker Jr. 3-yard run, Ty Morrison kick (Drive: 5 plays, 69 yards, 2:26; North Dakota 13–7)

Second quarter

- (11:11) UND – C.J. Elrichs 32-yard field goal (Drive: 5 plays, 32 yards, 1:44; North Dakota 16–7)

Third quarter

- (3:24) MONT – Brooks Davis 24-yard pass from Keali'i Ah Yat, Ty Morrison kick (Drive: 3 plays, 33 yards, 0:57; North Dakota 16–14)

Fourth quarter

- (14:00) UND – Korey Tai 4-yard pass from Jerry Kaminski, C.J. Elrichs kick (Drive: 10 plays, 75 yards, 4:24; North Dakota 23–14)
- (4:23) MONT – Ty Morrison 42-yard field goal (Drive: 10 plays, 67 yards, 3:04; North Dakota 23–17)
- (1:35) MONT – Brooks Favis 28-yard pass from Keali'i Ah Yat, Ty Morrison kick (Drive: 7 plays, 67 yards, 1:07; Montana 24–23)

Statistics	UND	MONT
First downs	19	18
Plays–yards	82–460	74–368
Rushes–yards	41–202	35–68
Passing yards	258	300
Passing: Comp–Att–Int	17–41–1	25–39–2
Turnovers	1	2
Time of possession	30:37	29:23

Team	Category	Player	Statistics
North Dakota	Passing	Jerry Kaminski	17/40, 258 yards, 3 TD, INT
North Dakota	Rushing	Jerry Kaminski	12 carries, 85 yards
North Dakota	Receiving	B.J. Fleming	5 receptions, 138 yards, TD
Montana	Passing	Keali'i Ah Yat	25/39, 300 yards, 2 TD, 2 INT
Montana	Rushing	Eli Gillman	16 carries, 82 yards
Montana	Receiving	Brooks Davis	5 receptions, 98 yards, 2 TD

=== Indiana State ===
Indiana State Sycamores (2–1) at No. 5 Montana Grizzlies (2–0) – Game summary

Quarter	1	2	3	4	Total
Sycamores	7	0	0	13	20
No. 5 Grizzlies	14	21	14	14	63

at Washington–Grizzly Stadium • Missoula, MT

- Date: September 20
- Game time: 1:00 p.m. MDT
- Game weather: Sunny • Temperature: 76 °F (24 °C)
- Game attendance: 26,193
- Referee: Kelly Holman
- TV announcers (ESPN+): Trey Bender (play-by-play), Jordan Tripp (analyst) and Kyle Hansen (sideline)

Game information

First quarter

- (4:54) MONT – Eli Gillman 69-yard run, Ty Morrison kick (Drive: 1 play, 69 yards, 0:12; Montana 7–0)
- (3:55) INST – Rashad Rochelle 51-yard pass from Keegan Patterson, Sebastian Lopez kick (Drive: 4 plays, 75 yards, 1:21; 7–7)
- (0:00) MONT – Eli Gillman 4-yard run, Ty Morrison kick (Drive: 10 plays, 75 yards, 3:55; Montana 14–7)

Second quarter

- (9:51) MONT – Keali'i Ah Yat 14-yard run, Ty Morrison kick (Drive: 10 plays, 74 yards, 4:41; Montana 21–7)
- (4:47) MONT – TJ Rausch 0-yard fumble recovery, Ty Morrison kick (Drive: 4 plays, −4 yards, 1:04; Montana 28–7)
- (1:33) MONT – Josh Gale 19-yard pass from Keali'i Ah Yat, Ty Morrison kick (Drive: 5 plays, 82 yards, 1:29; Montana 35–7)

Third quarter

- (14:01) MONT – Eli Gillman 23-yard run, Ty Morrison kick (Drive: 2 plays, 25 yards, 0:25; Montana 42–7)
- (9:40) MONT – Jordan Dever 62-yard pass from Keali'i Ah Yat, Ty Morrison kick (Drive: 5 plays, 92 yards, 1:53; Montana 49–7)

Fourth quarter

- (13:36) MONT – Malae Fonoti 12-yard run, Jo Silver kick (Drive: 15 plays, 80 yards, 8:16; Montana 56–7)
- (12:14) INST – Nick Osho 55-yard run, Sebastian Lopez PAT blocked (Drive: 4 plays, 75 yards, 1:22; Montana 56–13)
- (5:41) MONT – Tommy Running Rabbit 12-yard run, Jo Silver kick (Drive: 11 plays, 74 yards, 6:26; Montana 63–13)
- (5:21) INST – Nick Osho 79-yard run, Sebastian Lopez kick (Drive: 1 play, 79 yards, 0:13; Montana 63–20)

Statistics	INST	MONT
First downs	12	33
Plays–yards	58–387	81–647
Rushes–yards	30–198	51–303
Passing yards	189	344
Passing: Comp–Att–Int	15–28–1	24–30–0
Turnovers	2	0
Time of possession	23:18	38:22

Team	Category	Player	Statistics
Indiana State	Passing	Keegan Patterson	15/27, 189 yards, TD, INT
Indiana State	Rushing	Nick Osho	5 carries, 134 yards, 2 TD
Indiana State	Receiving	Rashad Rochelle	4 receptions, 75 yards, TD
Montana	Passing	Keali'i Ah Yat	22/27, 313 yards, 2 TD
Montana	Rushing	Eli Gillman	13 carries, 120 yards, 3 TD
Montana	Receiving	Michael Wortham	5 receptions, 78 yards

=== No. 8 Idaho (Little Brown Stein) ===
No. 8 Idaho Vandals (2–2) at No. 5 Montana Grizzlies (3–0) – Game summary

Quarter	1	2	3	4	Total
No. 8 Vandals	0	6	8	16	30
No. 5 Grizziles	10	7	14	10	41

at Washington–Grizzly Stadium • Missoula, MT

- Date: September 27
- Game time: 8:15 p.m. MDT
- Game weather: Sunny • Temperature: 67 °F (19 °C)
- Game attendance: 27,025
- Referee: Jeff Rink
- TV announcers (ESPN2): Clay Matvick (play-by-play) and Chase Daniel (analyst)

Game information

First quarter

- MONT - Ty Morrison 37-yard field goal, 11:11. Grizzlies 3-0. Drive: 8 plays, 55 yards, 3:49.
- MONT - Eli Gillman 2-yard run (Ty Morrison kick), 4:37. Grizzlies 10-0. Drive: 4 plays, 23 yards, 1:19.

Second quarter

- IDHO - Owen Adams 31-yard field goal, 13:22. Grizzlies 10-3. Drive: 12 plays, 61 yards, 6:15.
- MONT - Michael Wortham 11-yard run (Ty Morrison kick), 7:02. Grizzlies 17-3. Drive: 6 plays, 48 yards, 2:51.
- IDHO - Owen Adams 41-yard field goal, 2:55. Grizzlies 17-6. Drive: 9 plays, 51 yards, 4:07.

Third quarter

- MONT - Michael Wortham 22-yard pass from Keali'i Ah Yat (Ty Morrison kick), 9:22. Grizzlies 24-6. Drive: 7 plays, 65 yards, 3:33.
- IDHO - Joshua Wood 8-yard run (Emmerson Cortez-Menjivar pass for two-point conversion), 3:43. Grizzlies 24-14. Drive: 7 plays, 86 yards, 2:35.
- MONT - Eli Gillman 6-yard run (Ty Morrison kick), 0:38. Grizzlies 31-14. Drive: 5 plays, 50 yards, 2:54.

Fourth quarter

- IDHO - Joshua Wood 4-yard run (Joshua Wood pass to Nate Thomas for two-point conversion), 13:31. Grizzlies 31-22. Drive: 5 plays, 79 yards, 2:01.
- MONT - Keali'i Ah Yat 1-yard run (Ty Morrison kick), 7:49. Grizzlies 38-22. Drive: 11 plays, 79 yards, 5:37.
- MONT - Ty Morrison 26-yard field goal, 1:56. Grizzlies 41-22. Drive: 8 plays, 31 yards, 5:14.
- IDHO - Joshua Wood 1-yard run (Joshua Wood pass to Hayden Kincheloe for two-point conversion), 0:19. Grizzlies 41-30. Drive: 7 plays, 75 yards, 1:37.

Statistics	IDHO	MONT
First downs	15	22
Plays–yards	62–370	67–413
Rushes–yards	34–108	44–190
Passing yards	262	223
Passing: Comp–Att–Int	14–28–0	17–23–0
Turnovers	1	0
Time of possession	26:13	33:47

Team	Category	Player	Statistics
Idaho	Passing	Joshua Wood	14/28, 262 yards
Idaho	Rushing	Nate Thomas	19 carries, 70 yards
Idaho	Receiving	Ryan Jezioro	4 receptions, 102 yards
Montana	Passing	Keali'i Ah Yat	17/23, 223 yards, 1 TD
Montana	Rushing	Eli Gillman	27 carries, 142 yards, 2 TD
Montana	Receiving	Drew Deck	5 receptions, 67 yards

=== at Idaho State ===
No. 4 Montana Grizzlies (4–0) at Idaho State Bengals (2–3) – Game summary

Quarter	1	2	3	4	Total
No. 4 Grizzlies	10	8	10	14	42
Bengals	10	14	14	0	38

at ICCU Dome • Pocatello, ID

- Date: October 4
- Game time: 6:00 p.m. MDT
- Game weather: None (played indoors)
- Game attendance: 7,674
- Referee: Mike Bezner
- TV: ESPN+

Game information

First quarter

- (11:13) MONT – Michael Wortham 21-yard run, Ty Morrison kick (Drive: 8 plays, 75 yards, 3:47; Montana 7–0)
- (6:59) IDST – Dason Brooks 8-yard run, Trajan Sinatra kick (Drive: 9 plays, 88 yards, 4:09; Tied 7–7)
- (3:45) MONT – Ty Morrison 37-yard field goal (Drive: 8 plays, 50 yards, 3:08; Montana 10–7)
- (0:15) IDST – Trajan Sinatra 42-yard field goal (Drive: 9 plays, 51 yards, 3:30; Tied 10–10)

Second quarter

- (11:26) IDST – Carson Sudbury 3-yard run, Trajan Sinatra kick (Drive: 9 plays, 72 yards, 3:19; Idaho State 17–10)
- (6:05) MONT – Josh Gale 16-yard pass from Michael Wortham, Brooks Davis rush (Drive: 12 plays, 74 yards, 5:15; Montana 18–17)
- (3:57) IDST – Julian Mason 30-yard pass from Jordan Cooke, Trajan Sinatra kick (Drive: 5 plays, 75 yards, 2:08; Idaho State 24–18)

Third quarter

- (12:09) IDST – Dason Brooks 3-yard run, Trajan Sinatra kick (Drive: 7 plays, 75 yards, 2:51; Idaho State 31–18)
- (9:05) MONT – Eli Gillman 4-yard pass from Keali'i Ah Yat, Ty Morrison kick (Drive: 7 plays, 65 yards, 2:57; Idaho State 31–25)
- (6:16) MONT – Ty Morrison 35-yard field goal (Drive: 6 plays, 45 yards, 1:31; Idaho State 31–28)
- (0:52) IDST – Tsion Nunnally 22-yard pass from Jordan Cooke, Trajan Sinatra kick (Drive: 3 plays, 33 yards, 0:39; Idaho State 38–28)

Fourth quarter

- (14:22) MONT – Eli Gillman 5-yard run, Ty Morrison kick (Drive: 5 plays, 60 yards, 1:25; Idaho State 38–35)
- (3:06) MONT – Michael Wortham 9-yard run, Ty Morrison kick (Drive: 5 plays, 52 yards, 2:11; Montana 42–38)

Statistics	MONT	IDST
First downs	25	28
Plays–yards	78–517	77–497
Rushes–yards	35–118	23–76
Passing yards	399	421
Passing: Comp–Att–Int	25–43–1	33–54–1
Turnovers	1	1
Time of possession	29:43	30:17

Team	Category	Player	Statistics
Montana	Passing	Keali'i Ah Yat	23/40, 350 yards, TD, INT
Montana	Rushing	Eli Gillman	16 carries, 48 yards, TD
Montana	Receiving	Michael Wortham	6 receptions, 124 yards
Idaho State	Passing	Jordan Cooke	33/54, 421 yards, 2 TD, INT
Idaho State	Rushing	Dason Brooks	15 carries, 51 yards, 2 TD
Idaho State	Receiving	Michael Shulikov	8 receptions, 119 yards

=== Cal Poly ===
Cal Poly Mustangs (3–3) at No. 4 Montana Grizzlies (5–0) – Game summary

Quarter	1	2	3	4	Total
Mustangs	0	9	0	0	9
No. 4 Grizzlies	0	0	7	21	28

at Washington–Grizzly Stadium • Missoula, MT

- Date: October 11
- Game time: 2:00 p.m. MDT
- Game weather: Sunny, 56 °F (13 °C)
- Game attendance: 26,347
- Referee: Jim Crowley
- TV announcers (ESPN+): Trey Bender (play-by-play), Jordan Tripp (analyst) and Kyle Hansen (sideline)

Game information

First quarter

- No scoring plays.

Second quarter

- CP – Brooks Wheatley 26-yard pass from Ty Dieffenbach (run failed), 12:20. Mustangs 6–0. Drive: 4 plays, 79 yards, 1:38.
- CP – Noah Serna 27-yard field goal, 0:00. Mustangs 9–0. Drive: 9 plays, 70 yards, 1:02.

Third quarter

- MONT – Kenzel Lawler 21-yard interception return (Ty Morrison kick), 11:12. Mustangs 9–7.

Fourth quarter

- MONT – Michael Wortham 24-yard pass from Keali'i Ah Yat (Ty Morrison kick), 13:37. Grizzlies 14–9. Drive: 14 plays, 96 yards, 6:26.
- MONT – Eli Gillman 17-yard run (Ty Morrison kick), 9:35. Grizzlies 21–9. Drive: 3 plays, 50 yards, 1:26.
- MONT – Eli Gillman 13-yard run (Ty Morrison kick), 1:55. Grizzlies 28–9. Drive: 14 plays, 75 yards, 6:44.

Statistics	CP	MONT
First downs	11	27
Plays–yards	57–336	85–434
Rushes–yards	18–111	44–177
Passing yards	225	257
Passing: Comp–Att–Int	16–39–4	27–41–1
Turnovers	4	2
Time of possession	20:06	39:54

Team	Category	Player	Statistics
Cal Poly	Passing	Ty Dieffenbach	15/33, 225 yards, TD, 4 INT
Cal Poly	Rushing	Paul Hoyfield Jr.	8 carries, 53 yards
Cal Poly	Receiving	Alek Marshall	2 receptions, 59 yards
Montana	Passing	Keali'i Ah Yat	27/41, 257 yards, TD, INT
Montana	Rushing	Eli Gillman	18 carries, 123 yards, 2 TD
Montana	Receiving	Michael Wortham	10 receptions, 84 yards, TD

=== Sacred Heart ===
Sacred Heart Pioneers (5–2) at No. 4 Montana Grizzlies (6–0) – Game summary

Quarter	1	2	3	4	Total
Pioneers	0	7	7	7	21
No. 4 Grizzlies	22	7	0	14	43

at Washington–Grizzly Stadium • Missoula, MT

- Date: October 18
- Game time: 1:00 p.m. MDT
- Game weather: Sunny • Temperature: 46 °F (8 °C) • Wind: SW at 4 miles per hour (6.4 km/h)
- Game attendance: 26,147
- Referee: Spencer Mumford
- TV announcers (ESPN+): Trey Bender (play-by-play), Jordan Tripp (analyst) and Kyle Hansen (sideline)

Game information

First quarter

- (08:45) UM - Eli Gillman 4 yd pass from Keali'i Ah Yat, Ty Morrison kick, (15 plays, 72 yards, TOP 06:09; 7-0 Montana)
- (03:49) UM - Drew Deck 4 yd pass from Keali'i Ah Yat, Ty Morrison kick, (10 plays, 40 yards, TOP 03:55; 14-0 Montana)
- (01:20) UM - Michael Wortham 43 yd pass from Keali'i Ah Yat, Brooks Davis rush, (3 plays, 64 yards, TOP 01:02; 22-0 Montana)

Second quarter

- (04:01) SHU - Dean Hangey 3 yd pass from Jack Snyder, Matt Kling kick, (7 plays, 70 yards, TOP 03:17; 22-7 Montana)
- (00:13) UM - Keali'i Ah Yat 3 yd run, Ty Morrison kick, (12 plays, 77 yards, TOP 03:42; 29-7 Montana)

Third quarter

- (09:43) SHU - Mitchell Summers 3 yd run, Matt Kling kick, (10 plays, 75 yards, TOP 05:17; 29-14 Montana)

Fourth quarter

- (06:46) SHU - Dean Hangey 14 yd pass from Jack Snyder, Matt Kling kick, (16 plays, 88 yards, TOP 09:26; 29-21 Montana)
- (05:42) UM - Michael Wortham 51 yd pass from Keali'i Ah Yat, Ty Morrison kick, (3 plays, 68 yards, TOP 00:57; 36-21 Montana)
- (02:52) UM - Korbin Hendrix 49 yd pass from Keali'i Ah Yat, Ty Morrison kick, (3 plays, 60 yards, TOP 00:56; 43-21 Montana)

Statistics	SHU	MONT
First downs	19	23
Plays–yards	64–340	66–484
Rushes–yards	38–126	33–135
Passing yards	214	349
Passing: Comp–Att–Int	20–26–0	27–33–0
Turnovers	0	0
Time of possession	33:39	26:21

Team	Category	Player	Statistics
Sacred Heart	Passing	Jack Snyder	20/26, 214 yards, 2 TD
Sacred Heart	Rushing	Mitchell Summers	18 carries, 87 yards, TD
Sacred Heart	Receiving	Payton Rhoades	6 receptions, 72 yards
Montana	Passing	Keali'i Ah Yat	27/33, 349 yards, 5 TD
Montana	Rushing	Eli Gillman	17 carries, 63 yards
Montana	Receiving	Michael Wortham	7 receptions, 132 yards, 2 TD

=== at Sacramento State ===
No. 4 Montana Grizzlies (7–0) at Sacramento State Hornets (4–3) – Game summary

Quarter	1	2	3	4	Total
No. 4 Grizzlies	7	21	7	14	49
Hornets	7	14	0	14	35

at Hornet Stadium • Sacramento, CA

- Date: October 24
- Game time: 6:30 PM PDT
- Game weather: Clear • Temperature: 64 °F (18 °C) • Wind: SW at 7 miles per hour (11 km/h)
- Game attendance: 16,816
- Referee: Gregg Wilson
- TV announcers (ESPN2): Chuckie Kempf (play-by-play) and Darius Walker (analyst)

Game information

First quarter

- (5:04) SAC – Rodney Hammond Jr. 7-yard run, Grant Meadors kick (Drive: 13 plays, 68 yards, 6:41; Sacramento State 7–0)
- (1:22) MONT – Brooks Davis 24-yard pass from Keali'i Ah Yat, Ty Morrison kick (Drive: 8 plays, 55 yards, 3:33; Tied 7–7)

Second quarter

- (14:50) SAC – Ernest Campbell 63-yard pass from Cardell Williams, Grant Meadors kick (Drive: 4 plays, 75 yards, 1:32; Sacramento State 14–7)
- (12:46) MONT – Michael Wortham 64-yard pass from Keali'i Ah Yat, Ty Morrison kick (Drive: 5 plays, 75 yards, 1:57; Tied 14–14)
- (7:24) MONT – Michael Wortham 27-yard run, Ty Morrison kick (Drive: 4 plays, 40 yards, 2:03; Montana 21–14)
- (4:16) SAC – Rodney Hammond Jr. 6-yard run, Grant Meadors kick (Drive: 5 plays, 68 yards, 2:59; Tied 21–21)
- (1:00) MONT – Eli Gillman 13-yard run, Ty Morrison kick (Drive: 3 plays, 21 yards, 0:43; Montana 28–21)

Third quarter

- (10:18) MONT – Evan Shafer 11-yard pass from Keali'i Ah Yat, Ty Morrison kick (Drive: 9 plays, 75 yards, 4:42; Montana 35–21)

Fourth quarter

- (13:12) MONT – Michael Wortham 15-yard run, Ty Morrison kick (Drive: 8 plays, 55 yards, 3:58; Montana 42–21)
- (4:17) SAC – Cardell Williams 17-yard run, Grant Meadors kick (Drive: 14 plays, 87 yards, 5:20; Montana 42–28)
- (1:45) MONT – Malae Fonoti 4-yard run, Ty Morrison kick (Drive: 1 play, 4 yards, 0:05; Montana 49–28)
- (0:15) SAC – Cardell Williams 18-yard run, Grant Meadors kick (Drive: 7 plays, 75 yards, 1:30; Montana 49–35)

Statistics	MONT	SAC
First downs	18	24
Plays–yards	58–386	76–478
Rushes–yards	33–162	43–141
Passing yards	224	337
Passing: Comp–Att–Int	17–25–1	26–33–1
Turnovers	1	2
Time of possession	25:55	34:05

Team	Category	Player	Statistics
Montana	Passing	Keali'i Ah Yat	16/24, 196 yards, 3 TD, INT
Montana	Rushing	Michael Wortham	7 carries, 89 yards, 2 TD
Montana	Receiving	Michael Wortham	5 receptions, 80 yards, TD
Sacramento State	Passing	Cardell Williams	25/32, 332 yards, TD, INT
Sacramento State	Rushing	Rodney Hammond Jr.	12 carries, 54 yards, 2 TD
Sacramento State	Receiving	Ernest Campbell	9 receptions, 206 yards, TD

=== at Weber State ===
No. 3 Montana Grizzlies (8–0) at Weber State Wildcats (3–5) – Game summary

Quarter	1	2	3	4	Total
No. 3 Grizzlies	21	10	0	7	38
Wildcats	3	7	7	0	17

at Stewart Stadium • Ogden, UT

- Date: November 1
- Game time: 1:00 p.m. MDT
- Game attendance: 5,095
- Referee: Kelly Holman
- TV: ESPN+

Game information

First quarter

- MONT – Brooks Davis 12-yard run (Ty Morrison kick), 13:48. Grizzlies 7–0. Drive: 3 plays, 34 yards, 1:04.
- WEB – Sloan Calder 29-yard field goal, 6:50. Grizzlies 7–3. Drive: 11 plays, 64 yards, 6:58.
- MONT – Blake Bohannon 62-yard pass from Keali'i Ah Yat (Ty Morrison kick), 5:34. Grizzlies 14–3. Drive: 3 plays, 75 yards, 1:16.
- MONT – Keali'i Ah Yat 2-yard run (Ty Morrison kick), 1:34. Grizzlies 21–3. Drive: 7 plays, 64 yards, 2:56.

Second quarter

- MONT – Eli Gillman 14-yard run (Ty Morrison kick), 12:10. Grizzlies 28–3. Drive: 4 plays, 84 yards, 1:08.
- WEB – Jayleen Record 11-yard pass from Dijon Jennings (Sloan Calder kick), 3:39. Grizzlies 28–10. Drive: 15 plays, 77 yards, 8:25.
- MONT – Ty Morrison 33-yard field goal, 0:01. Grizzlies 31–10. Drive: 7 plays, 47 yards, 0:45.

Third quarter

- WEB – Jayleen Record 18-yard pass from Kingston Tisdell (Sloan Calder kick), 3:20. Grizzlies 31–17. Drive: 6 plays, 43 yards, 2:44.

Fourth quarter

- MONT – Evan Shafer 9-yard pass from Keali'i Ah Yat (Ty Morrison kick), 14:55. Grizzlies 38–17. Drive: 10 plays, 75 yards, 3:25.

Statistics	MONT	WEB
First downs	24	21
Plays–yards	70–522	75–327
Rushes–yards	35–193	33–114
Passing yards	329	213
Passing: Comp–Att–Int	18–35–0	25–42–1
Turnovers	0	2
Time of possession	25:08	34:52

Team	Category	Player	Statistics
Montana	Passing	Keali'i Ah Yat	15/27, 296 yards, 2 TD
Montana	Rushing	Eli Gillman	12 carries, 122 yards, TD
Montana	Receiving	Blake Bohannon	3 receptions, 131 yards, TD
Weber State	Passing	Kingston Tisdell	10/21, 116 yards, TD
Weber State	Rushing	Colter May	19 carries, 74 yards
Weber State	Receiving	Jayleen Record	8 receptions, 107 yards, 2 TD

=== Eastern Washington (EWU–UM Governors Cup) ===
Eastern Washington Eagles (4–5) at No. 2 Montana Grizzlies (9–0) – Game summary

Quarter	1	2	3	4	Total
Eagles	0	14	3	7	24
No. 2 Grizzlies	14	8	7	0	29

at Washington–Grizzly Stadium • Missoula, MT

- Date: November 8
- Game time: 1:00 p.m. MDT
- Game attendance: 25,861
- Referee: Jim Crowley
- TV: ESPN+

Game information

First quarter

- MONT – Michael Wortham 12-yard pass from Keali'i Ah Yat (Ty Morrison kick), 11:09. Grizzlies 7–0. Drive: 5 plays, 24 yards, 2:05.
- MONT – Korbin Hendrix 29-yard pass from Keali'i Ah Yat (Ty Morrison kick), 4:10. Grizzlies 14–0. Drive: 4 plays, 78 yards, 1:22.

Second quarter

- MONT – Keali'i Ah Yat 3-yard run (Brooks Davis run), 10:27. Grizzlies 22–0. Drive: 11 plays, 88 yards, 5:37.
- EWU – Kevin Allen III 10-yard pass from Jake Schakel (Soren McKee kick), 8:17. Grizzlies 22–7. Drive: 6 plays, 69 yards, 2:03.
- EWU – Kevin Allen III 10-yard run (Soren McKee kick), 1:16. Grizzlies 22–14. Drive: 9 plays, 80 yards, 4:16.

Third quarter

- MONT – Eli Gillman 25-yard run (Ty Morrison kick), 12:34. Grizzlies 29–14. Drive: 3 plays, 65 yards, 1:04.
- EWU – Soren McKee 24-yard field goal, 2:21. Grizzlies 29–17. Drive: 12 plays, 60 yards, 5:52.

Fourth quarter

- EWU – Cole Pruett 8-yard pass from Jake Schakel (Soren McKee kick), 1:01. Grizzlies 29–24. Drive: 11 plays, 63 yards, 2:36.

Statistics	EWU	MONT
First downs	27	13
Plays–yards	72–479	53–351
Rushes–yards	29–28	23–101
Passing yards	451	250
Passing: Comp–Att–Int	43–63–2	22–30–0
Turnovers	2	0
Time of possession	37:48	22:12

Team	Category	Player	Statistics
Eastern Washington	Passing	Jake Schakel	43/63, 451 yards, 2 TD, 2 INT
Eastern Washington	Rushing	Kevin Allen III	12 carries, 57 yards, TD
Eastern Washington	Receiving	Miles Williams	11 receptions, 136 yards
Montana	Passing	Keali'i Ah Yat	22/30, 250 yards, 2 TD
Montana	Rushing	Eli Gillman	13 carries, 83 yards, TD
Montana	Receiving	Michael Wortham	5 receptions, 81 yards, TD

=== at Portland State ===
No. 2 Montana Grizzlies (10–0) at Portland State Vikings (1–9) – Game summary

Quarter	1	2	3	4	Total
No. 2 Grizzlies	14	7	21	21	63
Vikings	7	3	0	7	17

at Hillsboro Stadium • Portland, OR

- Date: November 15
- Game time: 3:00 p.m. MDT
- Game attendance: 9,075
- Referee: Jeff Rink
- TV: ESPN+

Game information

First quarter

- PRST – Tyrese Smith 7-yard run (Mathias Uribe kick), 14:20. Vikings 7–0. Drive: 2 plays, 30 yards, 0:37.
- MONT – Eli Gillman 4-yard run (Ty Morrison kick), 6:33. Tied 7–7. Drive: 5 plays, 34 yards, 1:51.
- MONT – Eli Gillman 60-yard run (Ty Morrison kick), 0:00. Grizzlies 14–7. Drive: 5 plays, 85 yards, 2:03.

Second quarter

- MONT – Keali'i Ah Yat 15-yard run (Ty Morrison kick), 2:22. Grizzlies 21–7. Drive: 2 plays, 13 yards, 0:29.
- PRST – Mathias Uribe 33-yard field goal, 0:32. Grizzlies 21–10. Drive: 11 plays, 61 yards, 1:50.

Third quarter

- MONT – Brooks Davis 4-yard pass from Keali'i Ah Yat (Ty Morrison kick), 13:31. Grizzlies 28–10. Drive: 3 plays, 2 yards, 0:42.
- MONT – Josh Gale 27-yard pass from Keali'i Ah Yat (Ty Morrison kick), 12:03. Grizzlies 35–10. Drive: 2 plays, 22 yards, 0:37.
- MONT – Stevie Rocker Jr. 27-yard pass from Keali'i Ah Yat (Ty Morrison kick), 4:57. Grizzlies 42–10. Drive: 5 plays, 70 yards, 2:07.

Fourth quarter

- MONT – Malae Fonoti 1-yard run (Jo Silver kick), 11:21. Grizzlies 49–10. Drive: 15 plays, 60 yards, 7:05.
- MONT – Korbin Hendrix 25-yard pass from Jake Jensen (Jo Silver kick), 9:54. Grizzlies 56–10. Drive: 3 plays, 15 yards, 1:21.
- PRST – Tyrese Smith 75-yard run (Mathias Uribe kick), 9:41. Grizzlies 56–17. Drive: 1 play, 75 yards, 0:13.
- MONT – Hashim Jones 30-yard run (Jo Silver kick), 3:33. Grizzlies 63–17. Drive: 11 plays, 76 yards, 5:59.

Statistics	MONT	PRST
First downs	24	15
Plays–yards	73–455	47–361
Rushes–yards	44–208	30–143
Passing yards	247	218
Passing: Comp–Att–Int	20–29–0	17–34–5
Turnovers	2	5
Time of possession	31:36	28:24

Team	Category	Player	Statistics
Montana	Passing	Keali'i Ah Yat	14/21, 184 yards, 3 TD
Montana	Rushing	Eli Gillman	10 carries, 81 yards, 2 TD
Montana	Receiving	Drew Deck	3 receptions, 63 yards
Portland State	Passing	John-Keawe Sagapolutele	12/24, 155 yards, 3 INT
Portland State	Rushing	Tyrese Smith	11 carries, 101 yards, 2 TD
Portland State	Receiving	Terence Loville	5 receptions, 70 yards

=== No. 3 Montana State (Brawl of the Wild) ===
No. 3 Montana State Bobcats (9–2) at No. 2 Montana Grizzlies (11–0) – Game summary

Quarter	1	2	3	4	Total
No. 3 Bobcats	10	7	7	7	31
No. 2 Grizzlies	7	7	7	7	28

at Washington–Grizzly Stadium • Missoula, MT

- Date: November 22
- Game time: 12:00 p.m. MST
- Game weather: Clear, 45 °F (7 °C)
- Game attendance: 27,340
- Referee: Kelly Holman
- TV: ESPN+

Game information

First quarter

- MTST – Myles Sansted 39-yard field goal, 9:46. Bobcats 3–0. Drive: 10 plays, 51 yards, 5:08.
- MONT – Brooks Davis 14-yard pass from Kealiʻi Ah Yat (Ty Morrison kick), 6:59. Grizzlies 7–3. Drive: 6 plays, 54 yards, 2:38.
- MTST – Adam Jones 1-yard run (Myles Sansted kick), 0:47. Bobcats 10–7. Drive: 11 plays, 77 yards, 6:06.

Second quarter

- MTST – Dane Steel 27-yard pass from Justin Lamson (Myles Sansted kick), 5:00. Bobcats 17–7. Drive: 2 plays, 52 yards, 0:51.
- MONT – Kealiʻi Ah Yat 18-yard run (Ty Morrison kick), 1:15. Bobcats 17–14. Drive: 10 plays, 72 yards, 3:38.

Third quarter

- MONT – Michael Wortham 5-yard run (Ty Morrison kick), 6:08. Grizzlies 21–17. Drive: 16 plays, 81 yards, 8:46.
- MTST – Caden Dowler 34-yard interception return (Myles Sansted kick), 1:07. Bobcats 24–21.

Fourth quarter

- MTST – Justin Lamson 23-yard run (Myles Sansted kick), 8:58. Bobcats 31–21. Drive: 9 plays, 65 yards, 4:22.
- MONT – Eli Gillman 52-yard run (Ty Morrison kick), 6:59. Bobcats 31–28. Drive: 5 plays, 83 yards, 1:52.

Statistics	MTST	MONT
First downs	23	20
Plays–yards	62–416	60–364
Rushes–yards	42–241	28–178
Passing yards	175	186
Passing: Comp–Att–Int	18–20–0	26–32–1
Turnovers	0	1
Time of possession	31:57	28:03

Team	Category	Player	Statistics
Montana State	Passing	Justin Lamson	18/20, 175 yards, TD
Montana State	Rushing	Julius Davis	15 carries, 106 yards
Montana State	Receiving	Dane Steel	4 receptions, 54 yards, TD
Montana	Passing	Keali'i Ah Yat	26/32, 186 yards, TD, INT
Montana	Rushing	Eli Gillman	15 carries, 132 yards, TD
Montana	Receiving	Brooks Davis	10 receptions, 113 yards, TD

=== vs. No. 14 South Dakota State (Division I Second Round) ===
2025 NCAA Division I FCS Playoffs Second Round
No. 16 (14) South Dakota State Jackrabbits (9–4) at No. 3 (3) Montana Grizzlies (11–1) – Game summary

Quarter	1	2	3	4	Total
No. 16 (14) Jackrabbits	14	0	0	15	29
No. 3 (3) Grizzlies	6	16	7	21	50

at Washington–Grizzly Stadium • Missoula, MT

- Date: December 6
- Game time: 12:00 p.m. MST
- Game weather: Cloudy • Temperature: 37 °F (3 °C)
- Game attendance: 18,197
- Referee: John Kellermeier
- TV announcers (ESPN+): Richard Cross (play-by-play) and Jeff Woody (analyst)

Game information

First quarter

- SDST – Grahm Goering 95-yard pass from Chase Mason (Eli Stader kick), 7:31. Jackrabbits 7–0. Drive: 2 plays, 96 yards, 0:52.
- MONT – Stevie Rocker Jr. 45-yard pass from Keali'i Ah Yat (Joe Silver kick failed), 5:48. Jackrabbits 7–6. Drive: 4 plays, 45 yards, 1:43.
- SDST – Chase Mason 1-yard run (Eli Stader kick), 1:13. Jackrabbits 14–6. Drive: 8 plays, 65 yards, 4:29.

Second quarter

- MONT – Jo Silver 31-yard field goal, 10:38. Jackrabbits 14–9. Drive: 12 plays, 74 yards, 5:31.
- MONT – Eli Gillman 5-yard run (run failed), 5:42. Grizzlies 15–14. Drive: 6 plays, 46 yards, 2:40.
- MONT – Stevie Rocker Jr. 5-yard pass from Keali'i Ah Yat (Jo Silver kick), 0:06. Grizzlies 22–14. Drive: 8 plays, 59 yards, 1:07.

Third quarter

- MONT – Drew Deck 29-yard pass from Keali'i Ah Yat (Jo Silver kick), 5:07. Grizzlies 29–14. Drive: 8 plays, 80 yards, 3:56.

Fourth quarter

- MONT – Michael Wortham 28-yard pass from Keali'i Ah Yat (Jo Silver kick), 13:21. Grizzlies 36–14. Drive: 9 plays, 74 yards, 3:59.
- SDST – Chase Mason 1-yard run (Chase Mason–John Pica pass), 10:18. Grizzlies 36–22. Drive: 8 plays, 62 yards, 2:52.
- MONT – Eli Gillman 11-yard run (Jo Silver kick), 4:54. Grizzlies 43–22. Drive: 8 plays, 43 yards, 5:23.
- SDST – James Basinger 4-yard run (Eli Stader kick), 2:48. Grizzlies 43–29. Drive: 7 plays, 75 yards, 2:01.
- MONT – Malae Fonoti 3-yard run (Jo Silver kick), 1:20. Grizzlies 50–29. Drive: 5 plays, 47 yards, 1:27.

Statistics	SDST	MONT
First downs	19	32
Plays–yards	60–417	81–552
Rushes–yards	24–61	43–191
Passing yards	356	361
Passing: Comp–Att–Int	19–36–2	30–38–0
Turnovers	2	0
Time of possession	25:16	34:44

Team	Category	Player	Statistics
South Dakota State	Passing	Chase Mason	19/36, 356 yards, TD, 2 INT
South Dakota State	Rushing	Josiah Johnson	10 carries, 44 yards
South Dakota State	Receiving	Grahm Goering	4 receptions, 137 yards, TD
Montana	Passing	Keali'i Ah Yat	29/37, 360 yards, 4 TD
Montana	Rushing	Eli Gillman	24 carries, 135 yards, 2 TD
Montana	Receiving	Michael Wortham	8 receptions, 113 yards, TD

=== vs. No. 12 South Dakota (Division I Quarterfinal) ===
2025 NCAA Division I FCS Playoffs Quarterfinal
No. 12 (11) South Dakota Coyotes (10–4) at No. 3 (3) Montana Grizzlies (12–1) – Game summary

Quarter	1	2	3	4	Total
No. 12 (11) Coyotes	0	7	0	15	22
No. 3 (3) Grizzlies	10	14	7	21	52

at Washington–Grizzly Stadium, Missoula, MT

- Date: December 13
- Game time: 2:30 p.m.
- Game weather: Sunny • Temperature: 49 °F (9 °C)
- Game attendance: 22,725
- Referee: Alex Parella
- TV: ABC
- Box score

Game information

First quarter

- (8:55) MONT – Drew Deck 1-yard pass from Keali'i Ah Yat, Jo Silver kick (Drive: 12 plays, 75 yards, 6:00; MONT 7–0)
- (5:37) MONT – Jo Silver 24-yard field goal (Drive: 7 plays, 27 yards, 1:56; MONT 10–0)

Second quarter

- (12:37) MONT – Eli Gillman 1-yard run, Jo Silver kick (Drive: 13 plays, 77 yards, 6:24; MONT 17–0)
- (5:30) MONT – Michael Worthan 53-yard pass from Keali'i Ah Yat, Jo Silver kick (Drive: 5 plays, 83 yards, 2:11; MONT 24–0)
- (0:34) SDAK – L.J. Phillips Jr. 23-yard run, Will Leyland kick (Drive: 9 plays, 75 yards, 4:56; MONT 24–7)

Third quarter

- (11:58) MONT – Drew Deck 93-yard punt return, Jo Silver kick (MONT 31–7)

Fourth quarter

- (14:53) MONT – Michael Wortham 51-yard pass from Keali'i Ah Yat, Jo SIlver kick (Drive: 5 plays, 79 yards, 2:29; MONT 38–7)
- (13:51) SDAK – Jack Martens 69-yard pass from Aidan Bouman, Will Leyland kick (Drive: 4 plays, 75 yards, 1:02; MONT 38–14)
- (8:42) SDAK – Tysen Boze 20-yard pass form Aidan Bouman, Aidan Bouman pass to Tysen Boze for two-point conversion (Drive: 11 plays, 91 yards, 3:41; MONT 38–22)
- (2:40) MONT – Michael Wortham 11-yard run, Jo Silver kick (Drive: 11 plays, 82 yards, 6:01; MONT 45–22)
- (0:31) MONT – Hashim Jones 20-yard run, Jo Silver kick (Drive: 4 plays, 27 yards, 1:44; MONT 52–22)

Statistics	SDAK	MONT
First downs	15	21
Plays–yards	63–353	63–449
Rushes–yards	31–122	33–144
Passing yards	231	305
Passing: Comp–Att–Int	15–32–1	21–30–0
Turnovers	2	0
Time of possession	30:05	29:55

Team	Category	Player	Statistics
South Dakota	Passing	Aidan Bouman	15/32, 231 yards, 2 TD, INT
South Dakota	Rushing	L.J. Phillips Jr.	15 carries, 74 yards, TD
South Dakota	Receiving	Jack Martens	3 receptions, 93 yards, TD
Montana	Passing	Keali'i Ah Yat	18/39, 148 yards, 4 INT
Montana	Rushing	Michael Wortham	3 carries, 43 yards, TD
Montana	Receiving	Michael Wortham	11 receptions, 201 yards, 2 TD

=== at No. 2 Montana State (Division I Semifinal) ===
2025 NCAA Division I FCS Playoffs Semifinal
No. 3 (3) Montana Grizzlies (13–1) at No. 2 (2) Montana State Bobcats (12–2) – Game summary

Quarter	1	2	3	4	Total
No. 3 (3) Grizzlies	0	16	7	0	23
No. 2 (2) Bobcats	13	7	7	21	48

at Bobcat Stadium • Bozeman, Montana

- Date: December 20
- Game time: 2:00 p.m. MST
- Game weather: Sunny, 33 °F (1 °C)
- Game attendance: 22,277
- Referee: Bruce Austin
- TV announcers (ESPN2/ABC): Dave Flemming (play by play), Brock Osweiler (analyst) and Dawn Davenport (sideline reporter)

Game information

First quarter

- MTST – Justin Lamson 4-yard run (Myles Sansted kick), 10:40. Bobcats 7–0. Drive: 7 plays, 60 yards, 3:18.
- MTST – Adam Jones 7-yard run (pass failed), 2:59. Bobcats 13–0. Drive: 10 plays, 55 yards, 4:22.

Second quarter

- MONT – Jo Silver 21-yard field goal, 12:52. Bobcats 13–3. Drive: 13 plays, 72 yards, 5:07.
- MTST – Adam Jones 54-yard run (Myles Sansted kick), 11:25. Bobcats 20–3. Drive: 3 plays, 68 yards, 1:27.
- MONT – Eli Gillman 17-yard run (run failed), 7:02. Bobcats 20–9. Drive: 9 plays, 75 yards, 4:23.
- MONT – Keali'i Ah Yat 5-yard run (Jo Silver kick), 0:12. Bobcats 20–16. Drive: 8 plays, 40 yards, 3:11.

Third quarter

- MONT – Jake Olson 1-yard pass from Keali'i Ah Yat (Jo Silver kick), 8:47. Grizzlies 23–20. Drive: 7 plays, 80 yards, 3:15.
- MTST – Rocky Lencioni 2-yard pass from Justin Lamson (Myles Sansted kick), 2:07. Bobcats 27–23. Drive: 14 plays, 75 yards, 6:40.

Fourth quarter

- MTST – Taco Dowler 87-yard pass from Justin Lamson (Myles Sansted kick), 12:05. Bobcats 34–23. Drive: 5 plays, 90 yards, 2:40.
- MTST – Justin Lamson 7-yard run (Myles Sansted kick), 7:57. Bobcats 41–23. Drive: 5 plays, 60 yards, 3:05.
- MTST – Bryce Grebe 40-yard interception return (Myles Sansted kick), 7:01. Bobcats 48–23.

Statistics	MONT	MTST
First downs	18	23
Plays–yards	67–347	63–449
Rushes–yards	25–96	44–240
Passing yards	251	209
Passing: Comp–Att–Int	27–42–1	13–19–0
Turnovers	1	1
Time of possession	28:17	31:43

Team	Category	Player	Statistics
Montana	Passing	Keali'i Ah Yat	27/42, 251 yards, TD, INT
Montana	Rushing	Eli Gillman	16 carries, 106 yards, TD
Montana	Receiving	Michael Wortham	8 receptions, 85 yards
Montana State	Passing	Justin Lamson	13/19, 209 yards, 2 TD
Montana State	Rushing	Adam Jones	16 carries, 131 yards, 2 TD
Montana State	Receiving	Taco Dowler	5 receptions, 125 yards, TD

== Ranking movements ==
Ranking movements Legend: ██ Increase in ranking ██ Decrease in ranking ( ) = First-place votes
	Week														
Poll	Pre	1	2	3	4	5	6	7	8	9	10	11	12	13	Final
STATS FCS	7	6	5	5	5	4	4	4	4	3	2	2	2	3	3
Coaches	9	10	7	5	4	4	4	4	4	3	2	2 (1)	2 (1)	4	3
