= 2025 UC Davis Aggies football team =

American college football season

2025 UC Davis Aggies football

NCAA Division I Quarterfinal, L 31–42 vs. Illinois State
- Conference: Big Sky Conference

Ranking
- STATS: No. 8
- FCS Coaches: No. 8
- Record: 9–4 (6–2 Big Sky)
- Head coach: Tim Plough (2nd season)
- Offensive coordinator: Paul Shelton (2nd season)
- Offensive scheme: Up-tempo/spread
- Defensive coordinator: Matt Coombs (6th season)
- Base defense: 4–2–5
- Home stadium: UC Davis Health Stadium

2025 Big Sky Conference football standings
	Conf.			Overall
Team	W		L	W		L
No. 1 Montana State $^	8	–	0	14	–	2
No. 3 Montana ^	7	–	1	13	–	2
No. 8 UC Davis ^	6	–	2	9	–	4
Sacramento State	5	–	3	7	–	5
Idaho State	5	–	3	6	–	6
Northern Arizona	4	–	4	7	–	5
Eastern Washington	4	–	4	5	–	7
Cal Poly	2	–	6	4	–	8
Idaho	2	–	6	4	–	8
Northern Colorado	2	–	6	4	–	8
Weber State	2	–	6	4	–	8
Portland State	1	–	7	1	–	11
$ – Conference champion; ^ – FCS playoff participant; Rankings from STATS Poll

The 2025 UC Davis Aggies football team represented the University of California, Davis during the 2025 NCAA Division I FCS football season as a member of the Big Sky Conference. They were led by second-year head coach Tim Plough and played their home games at UC Davis Health Stadium in Davis, California. It was the Aggies' 107th season overall, and 14th in the Big Sky.

UC Davis finished the regular season 8–3 and received a bye during the first week of the FCS playoffs due to their No. 11 (No.8 by the playoff committee) ranking. After defeating the Rhode Island Rams in the Second Round at home, the Aggies would fall to eventual championship runner-ups Illinois State in the Quarterfinals, also at home. Due to the FCS Committee's ranking of the Aggies prior to the start of the playoffs, UC Davis was able to host two consecutive playoff games for the first time since joining Division I FCS in 2003, and the first time hosting a Quarterfinal since 2001.

UC Davis saw record average attendance this season, with an average of 12,991 fans per a game alongside the new stadium record of 17,217, which sets the highest attendance out of all of UC Davis's home venues. This season also saw the first time a linear ESPN channel had been hosted at a UC Davis home game, with the Second Round game against Rhose Island being shown.

== Preseason ==
=== Polls ===
On July 17, 2025, during the virtual Big Sky Kickoff, the Aggies were predicted to finish second in the Big Sky by the coaches and third by the media.

=== Transfers ===
==== Outgoing ====
Player	Position	Destination
Robbie Mascheroni	WR	Idaho State
Josh Gale	TE	Montana
Kavir Bains-Marquez	S	Pittsburgh
Blake Cotton	DB	Utah

==== Incoming ====
Player	Position	Previous school
Cole Batson	S	Boston College
Nate Rutchena	TE	California
Derrell Porter	DL	Dartmouth
Jacob Psyk	DL	Harvard
Marquis Bell	DB	Liberty
Khalani Riddick	DB	Southeast Missouri State
Ty Richardson	DB	Tufts
Teeg Slone	S	Utah State
Josiah Allen	DB	UTEP
AJ Hasson	OL	Wake Forest
Dylan Mauro	P	Washington State
Roice Cleeland	OL	Washington

=== Players Signed into the NFL and CFL ===
Round	Player Number	NFL team	Player	Position
Undrafted	3	New England Patriots	Lan Larison	RB
Undrafted	7	Ottawa Redblacks	Miles Hastings	QB
Undrafted	1	Edmonton Elks	CJ Hutton	WR

== Schedule ==
On August 23, UC Davis was set to play in the FCS Kickoff in their first of three nationally televised games this season. With just 7:46 left in the fourth quarter, and Mercer having the ball with a 1st-and-10 at the UC Davis 48-yard line, the game was suspended due to lightning. In the early morning hours of August 24, it was announced that the game would not resume, and that both teams had agreed to declare it a no contest despite the Aggies leading 23–17.

Date	Time	Opponent	Rank	Site	TV	Result	Attendance
August 23	4:00 p.m.	vs. No. 11 Mercer*	No. 8	Cramton Bowl; Montgomery, AL (FCS Kickoff)	ESPN	No contest	
August 30	7:00 p.m.	at Utah Tech*	No. 8	Greater Zion Stadium; St. George, UT	ESPN+	W 31–24	4,629
September 6	8:00 p.m.	at Washington*	No. 8	Husky Stadium; Seattle, WA	BTN	L 10–70	65,421
September 20	7:00 p.m.	Southern Utah*	No. 9	UC Davis Health Stadium; Davis, CA	ESPN+	W 50–34	17,217‡
September 27	7:00 p.m.	Weber State	No. 9	UC Davis Health Stadium; Davis, CA	ESPN+	W 34–12	12,238
October 4	5:00 p.m.	at Cal Poly	No. 7	Alex G. Spanos Stadium; San Luis Obispo, CA (Battle for the Golden Horseshoe)	ESPN+	W 34–27	10,006
October 11	4:00 p.m.	No. 14 Northern Arizona^{†}	No. 6	UC Davis Health Stadium; Davis, CA	ESPN+	W 45–24	9,937
October 25	12:00 p.m.	at Northern Colorado	No. 6	Nottingham Field; Greeley, CO	ESPN+	W 27–16	4,412
November 1	1:00 p.m.	Idaho State	No. 6	UC Davis Health Stadium; Davis, CA	ESPN+	L 36–38	10,973
November 8	4:00 p.m.	at Idaho	No. 11	P1FCU Kibbie Dome; Moscow, ID	SWX/ESPN+	W 28–14	10,712
November 15	7:15 p.m.	at No. 3 Montana State	No. 9	Bobcat Stadium; Bozeman, MT	ESPN2	L 17–38	21,777
November 22	1:00 p.m.	Sacramento State	No. 15	UC Davis Health Stadium; Davis, CA (Causeway Classic)	ESPN+	W 31–27	14,590
December 6	7:00 p.m.	No. 8 Rhode Island*	No. 11	UC Davis Health Stadium; Davis, CA (NCAA Division I Second Round)	ESPN2	W 47–26	8,525
December 13	2:00 p.m.	No. 17т Illinois State*	No. 11	UC Davis Health Stadium; Davis, CA (NCAA Division I Quarterfinal)	ESPN+	L 31–42	9,216
*Non-conference game; ^{†}Homecoming; Rankings from STATS Poll released prior to the game; All times are in Pacific time; Source:

‡New UC Davis Health Stadium attendance record.

== Game summaries ==
=== vs. No. 11 Mercer (FCS Kickoff) ===
No. 8 UC Davis Aggies (0–0) vs. No. 11 Mercer Bears (0–0) – Game summary – NO CONTEST

Quarter	1	2	3	4	Total
No. 8 Aggies	-	-	-	-	0
No. 11 Bears	-	-	-	-	0

at Cramton Bowl • Montgomery, AL

- Date: August 23
- Game time: 6:00 PM CDT
- TV announcers (ESPN): Jay Alter (play-by-play) and Rocky Boiman (analyst)

Statistics	UCD	MER
First downs	–	–
Total yards	–	–
Rushing yards	–	–
Passing yards	–	–
Passing: Comp–Att–Int	–	–
Time of possession	–	–

Team	Category	Player	Statistics
UC Davis	Passing	–	–
UC Davis	Rushing	–	–
UC Davis	Receiving	–	–
Mercer	Passing	–	–
Mercer	Rushing	–	–
Mercer	Receiving	–	–

=== at Utah Tech ===
No. 8 UC Davis Aggies (0–0) at Utah Tech Trailblazers (0–0) – Game summary

Quarter	1	2	3	4	Total
No. 8 Aggies	7	0	14	10	31
Trailblazers	3	7	14	0	24

at Greater Zion Stadium • St. George, UT

- Date: August 30
- Game time: 7:00 pm
- Game attendance: 4,629
- Referee: Jeremee Tate
- TV: ESPN+

Game information

First quarter

- UTU – Ilya Uvaydov 33-yard field goal, 9:06. Trailblazers 3–0. Drive: 6 plays, 15 yards, 2:53.
- UCD – Jordan Fisher 66-yard run (Hunter Ridley kick), 8:32. Aggies 7–3. Drive: 2 plays, 75 yards, 0:34.

Second quarter

- UTU – Eric Olsen 1-yard pass from Reggie Graf (Ilya Uvaydov kick), 0:31. Trailblazers 10–7. Drive: 13 plays, 47 yards, 5:36.

Third quarter

- UTU – Tru Tanner 45-yard pass from Reggie Graf (Ilya Uvaydov kick), 14:06. Trailblazers 17–7. Drive: 1 play, 45 yards, 0:07.
- UTU – Chris Street 1-yard run (Ilya Uvaydov kick), 8:01. Trailblazers 24–7. Drive: 6 plays, 50 yards, 2:32.
- UCD – Zach Jones 14-yard pass from Caden Pinnick (Hunter Ridley kick), 5:04. Trailblazers 24–14. Drive: 8 plays, 75 yards, 2:57.
- UCD – Samuel Gbatu Jr. 20-yard pass from Caden Pinnick (Hunter Ridley kick), 2:02. Trailblazers 24–21. Drive: 4 plays, 51 yards, 1:11.

Fourth quarter

- UCD – Hunter Ridley 29-yard field goal, 12:42. Tied 24–24. Drive: 7 plays, 14 yards, 2:45.
- UCD – Samuel Gbatu Jr. 60-yard pass from Caden Pinnick (Hunter Ridley kick), 6:17. Aggies 31–24. Drive: 9 plays, 81 yards, 3:52.

Statistics	UCD	UTU
First downs	21	18
Plays–yards	74–425	74–360
Rushes–yards	43–164	30–81
Passing yards	253	272
Passing: Comp–Att–Int	21-31-1	28–44–2
Turnovers	2	4
Time of possession	27:45	32:15

Team	Category	Player	Statistics
UC Davis	Passing	Caden Pinnick	21/31, 253 yards, 3 TD, INT
UC Davis	Rushing	Jordan Fisher	16 carries, 105 yards, TD
UC Davis	Receiving	Samuel Gbatu Jr.	4 receptions, 93 yards, 2 TD
Utah Tech	Passing	Bronson Barben	24/39, 222 yards, 2 INT
Utah Tech	Rushing	Bronson Barben	9 carries, 28 yards
Utah Tech	Receiving	Kaden Eggett	3 receptions, 58 yards

=== at Washington (FBS) ===
No. 8 UC Davis Aggies (1–0) at Washington Huskies (FBS) (1–0) – Game summary

Quarter	1	2	3	4	Total
No. 8 Aggies	3	7	0	0	10
Huskies (FBS)	14	28	14	14	70

at Husky Stadium • Seattle, Washington

- Date: September 6
- Game time: 8:00 p.m.
- Game weather: Cloudy • Temperature: 67 °F (19 °C) • Wind: SW at 6 miles per hour (9.7 km/h)
- Game attendance: 65,421
- Referee: Matt Packowski
- TV announcers (BTN): A.J. Kanell (play-by-play), Marcel Reece (analyst), and Alyssa Charlston (sideline reporter)

Game information

First quarter

- WASH – Jonah Coleman 15-yard run (Grady Gross kick), 12:17. Huskies 7–0. Drive: 3 plays, 60 yards, 1:20.
- WASH – Jonah Coleman 1-yard run (Grady Gross kick), 8:28. Huskies 14–0. Drive: 6 plays, 70 yards, 2:55.
- UCD – Hunter Ridley 45-yard field goal, 5:35. Huskies 14–3. Drive: 8 plays, 47 yards, 2:53.

Second quarter

- WASH – Demond Williams Jr. 8-yard run (Grady Gross kick), 14:51. Huskies 21–3. Drive: 12 plays, 63 yards, 5:39.
- WASH – Jonah Coleman 9-yard run (Grady Gross kick), 10:27. Huskies 28–3. Drive: 11 plays, 62 yards, 4:12.
- UCD – Matteo Perez 1-yard pass from Caden Pinnick (Hunter Ridley kick), 5:28. Huskies 28–10. Drive: 8 plays, 65 yards, 4:59.
- WASH – Jonah Coleman 7-yard run (Grady Gross kick), 2:36. Huskies 35–10. Drive: 6 plays, 65 yards, 2:52.
- WASH – Denzel Boston 78-yard punt return (Grady Gross kick), 1:43. Huskies 42–10.

Third quarter

- WASH – Jonah Coleman 5-yard run (Grady Gross kick), 11:31. Huskies 49–10. Drive: 9 plays, 56 yards, 3:18.
- WASH – Dezmen Roebuck 47-yard pass from Demond Williams Jr. (Grady Gross kick), 4:33. Huskies 56–10. Drive: 7 plays, 90 yards, 2:41.

Fourth quarter

- WASH – Kai Horton 10-yard run (Grady Gross kick), 13:52. Huskies 63–10. Drive: 9 plays, 64 yards, 4:03.
- WASH – Adam Mohammed 4-yard run (Grady Gross kick), 3:02. Huskies 70–10. Drive: 13 plays, 93 yards, 7:52.

Statistics	UCD	WASH
First downs	13	34
Plays–yards	52–218	76–628
Rushes–yards	24–76	46–324
Passing yards	142	304
Passing: comp–att–int	14–28–1	19–30–0
Turnovers	1	0
Time of possession	24:52	35:08

Team	Category	Player	Statistics
UC Davis	Passing	Caden Pinnick	8/16, 50 yards, TD, INT
UC Davis	Rushing	Carter Vargas	5 carries, 43 yards
UC Davis	Receiving	Mitchell Dixon	2 receptions, 44 yards
Washington	Passing	Demond Williams Jr.	16/25, 254 yards, TD
Washington	Rushing	Jonah Coleman	15 carries, 111 yards, 5 TD
Washington	Receiving	Dezmen Roebuck	4 receptions, 77 yards, TD

=== Southern Utah ===
Southern Utah Thunderbirds (1–2) at No. 9 UC Davis Aggies (1–1) – Game summary

Quarter	1	2	3	4	Total
Thunderbirds	7	13	7	7	34
No. 9 Aggies	14	8	21	7	50

at UC Davis Health Stadium • Davis, CA

- Date: September 20
- Game time: 7:00 p.m. PDT
- Game weather: Sunny • Temperature: 82 °F (28 °C)
- Game attendance: 17,217
- Referee: Jeff Rink
- TV announcers (ESPN+): Scott Marsh (play-by-play) and Scott Gordon (analyst)

Game information

First quarter

- (10:53) UCD – Zach Jones 11-yard run, Hunter Ridley kick (Drive: 7 plays, 84 yards, 2:36; UC Davis 7–0)
- (7:39) UCD – Winston Williams 10-yard pass from Caden Pinnick, Hunter Ridley kick (Drive: 4 plays, 68 yards, 1:25; UC Davis 14–0)
- (2:02) SUU – Gabe Nunez 28-yard pass from Bronson Barron, Jayden Rogers kick (Drive: 2 plays, 52 yards, 0:46; UC Davis 14–7)

Second quarter

- (7:01) SUU – Braedon Wissler 15-yard pass from Bronson Barron, Jayden Rogers kick (Drive: 16 plays, 80 yards, 8:02; Tied 14–14)
- (5:57) UCD – Jordan Fisher 6-yard run, Dylan Mauro rush (Drive: 2 plays, 63 yards, 0:55; UC Davis 22–14)
- (1:15) SUU – Joshua Dye 8-yard run (Drive: 10 plays, 80 yards, 4:34; UC Davis 22–20)

Third quarter

- (14:48) UCD – Jordan Fisher 75-yard run, Hunter Ridley kick (Drive: 1 play, 75 yards, 0:12; UC Davis 29–20)
- (11:10) SUU – Will Burns 1-yard run, Jayden Rogers kick (Drive: 7 plays, 66 yards, 3:31; UC Davis 29–27)
- (7:55) UCD – Mitchell Dixon 8-yard pass from Caden Pinnick, Hunter Ridley kick (Drive: 1 play, 8 yards, 0:08; UC Davis 36–27)
- (0:55) UCD – Carter Vargas 23-yard run, Hunter Ridley kick (Drive: 8 plays, 83 yards, 3:33; UC Davis 43–27)

Fourth quarter

- (9:29) UCD – Carter Vargas 47-yard run, Hunter Ridley kick (Drive: 6 plays, 78 yards, 3:46; UC Davis 50–27)
- (1:15) SUU – Braedon Wissler 1-yard run, Jayden Rogers kick (Drive: 14 plays, 93 yards, 3:32; UC Davis 50–34)

Statistics	SUU	UCD
First downs	28	18
Plays–yards	86–549	48–519
Rushes–yards	43–233	27–357
Passing yards	316	162
Passing: Comp–Att–Int	23–43–1	13–21–0
Turnovers	2	0
Time of possession	36:59	23:01

Team	Category	Player	Statistics
Southern Utah	Passing	Bronson Barron	23/43, 316 yards, 2 TD, INT
Southern Utah	Rushing	Joshua Dye	20 carries, 155 yards, TD
Southern Utah	Receiving	Gabe Nunez	8 receptions, 106 yards, TD
UC Davis	Passing	Caden Pinnick	13/21, 162 yards, 2 TD
UC Davis	Rushing	Jordan Fisher	12 carries, 170 yards, 2 TD
UC Davis	Receiving	Samuel Gbatu Jr.	3 receptions, 45 yards

=== Weber State ===
Weber State Wildcats (2–2) at No. 9 UC Davis Aggies (2–1) – Game summary

Quarter	1	2	3	4	Total
Wildcats	0	3	3	6	12
No. 9 Aggies	0	17	3	14	34

at UC Davis Health Stadium • Davis, CA

- Date: September 27
- Game time: 7:00 p.m. PDT
- Game weather: Sunny • Temperature: 70 °F (21 °C)
- Game attendance: 12,238
- Referee: Mike Bezner
- TV announcers (ESPN+): Scott Marsh (play-by-play) and Scott Gordon (analyst)

Game information

First quarter

- No scoring plays.

Second quarter

- (12:13) WEB – Sloan Calder 33-yard field goal (Drive: 13 plays, 51 yards, 6:00; Weber State 3–0)
- (7:07) UCD – Caden Pinnick 2-yard run, Hunter Ridley kick (Drive: 14 plays, 75 yards, 5:06; UC Davis 7–3)
- (3:47) UCD – Carter Vargas 57-yard pass from Caden Pinnick, Hunter Ridley kick (Drive: 3 plays, 57 yards, 1:27; UC Davis 14–3)
- (0:00) UCD – Hunter Ridley 45-yard field goal (Drive: 9 plays, 53 yards, 1:13; UC Davis 17–3)

Third quarter

- (7:44) UCD – Hunter Ridley 25-yard field goal (Drive: 12 plays, 67 yards, 4:31; UC Davis 20–3)
- (3:11) WEB – Sloan Calder 29-yard field goal (Drive: 8 plays, 51 yards, 4:26; UC Davis 20–6)

Fourth quarter

- (13:37) UCD – Rex Connors 2-yard run, Hunter Ridley kick (Drive: 8 plays, 75 yards, 4:34; UC Davis 27–6)
- (8:59) UCD – Samuel Gbatu Jr. 85-yard pass from Caden Pinnick, Hunter Ridley kick (Drive: 2 plays, 87 yards, 0:42; UC Davis 34–6)
- (3:03) WEB – Marcus Chretien 11-yard pass from Dijon Jennings (Drive: 12 plays, 73 yards, 5:51; UC Davis 34–12)

Statistics	WEB	UCD
First downs	17	21
Plays–yards	67–313	66–469
Rushes–yards	43–138	37–175
Passing yards	175	294
Passing: Comp–Att–Int	16–24–0	17–29–0
Turnovers	0	1
Time of possession	34:27	25:33

Team	Category	Player	Statistics
Weber State	Passing	Jackson Gilkey	14/22, 138 yards
Weber State	Rushing	Davion Godley	19 carries, 60 yards
Weber State	Receiving	Marvin Session	3 receptions, 44 yards
UC Davis	Passing	Caden Pinnick	16/27, 288 yards, 2 TD
UC Davis	Rushing	Carter Vargas	8 carries, 55 yards
UC Davis	Receiving	Samuel Gbatu Jr.	4 receptions, 112 yards, TD

=== at Cal Poly (Battle for the Golden Horseshoe) ===
No. 7 UC Davis Aggies (3–1) at Cal Poly Mustangs (3–2) – Game summary

Quarter	1	2	3	4	Total
No. 7 Aggies	0	13	7	14	34
Mustangs	7	3	10	7	27

at Alex G. Spanos Stadium • San Luis Obispo, CA

- Date: October 4
- Game time: 5:00 PM PDT
- Game weather: Sunny • Temperature: 71 °F (22 °C) • Wind: NW at 10 miles per hour (16 km/h)
- Game attendance: 10,006
- Referee: Robert Quello
- TV announcers (ESPN+): Chris Sylvester (play-by-play) and John Kane (analyst)

Game information

First quarter

- (9:27) CP – Logan Booher 23-yard pass from Bo Kelly, Noah Serna kick (Drive: 12 plays, 69 yards, 5:26; Cal Poly 7–0)

Second quarter

- (13:25) UCD – Zach Jones 36-yard pass from Caden Pinnick, Hunter Ridley kick (Drive: 5 plays, 67 yards, 1:50; Tied 7–7)
- (7:24) CP – Gianluca Dimauro 33-yard field goal (Drive: 12 plays, 73 yards, 6:01; Cal Poly 10–7)
- (1:54) UCD – Samuel Gbatu Jr. 6-yard pass from Caden Pinnick (Drive: 11 plays, 73 yards, 5:23; UC Davis 13–10)

Third quarter

- (7:42) CP – Noah Serna 30-yard field goal (Drive: 12 plays, 52 yards, 5:17; Tied 13–13)
- (4:03) UCD – Zach Jones 6-yard pass from Caden Pinnick, Hunter Ridley kick (Drive: 8 plays, 75 yards, 3:39; UC Davis 20–13)
- (1:04) CP – Logan Booher 24-yard pass from Bo Kelly, Noah Serna kick (Drive: 8 plays, 71 yards, 2:53; Tied 20–20)

Fourth quarter

- (11:20) UCD – Carter Vargas 9-yard run, Hunter Ridley kick (Drive: 9 plays, 75 yards, 4:44; UC Davis 27–20)
- (6:05) UCD – Caden Pinnick 7-yard run, Hunter Ridley kick (Drive: 6 plays, 83 yards, 3:35; UC Davis 34–20)
- (1:55) CP – Bo Kelly 1-yard pass from Michael Briscoe, Noah Serna kick (Drive: 6 plays, 80 yards, 1:34; UC Davis 34–27)

Statistics	UCD	CP
First downs	23	21
Plays–yards	63–449	70–342
Rushes–yards	37–136	31–71
Passing yards	313	271
Passing: Comp–Att–Int	21–26–0	22–39–0
Turnovers	0	0
Time of possession	30:09	29:51

Team	Category	Player	Statistics
UC Davis	Passing	Caden Pinnick	21/26, 313 yards, 3 TD
UC Davis	Rushing	Caden Pinnick	11 carries, 60 yards, TD
UC Davis	Receiving	Stacy Dobbins	3 receptions, 89 yards
Cal Poly	Passing	Bo Kelly	20/37, 251 yards, 2 TD
Cal Poly	Rushing	Trey Wilson	11 carries, 33 yards
Cal Poly	Receiving	Logan Booher	6 receptions, 101 yards, 2 TD

=== No. 14 Northern Arizona ===
No. 14 Northern Arizona Lumberjacks (4–2) at No. 6 UC Davis Aggies (4–1) – Game summary

Quarter	1	2	3	4	Total
No. 14 Lumberjacks	7	0	10	7	24
No. 6 Aggies	3	7	14	21	45

at UC Davis Health Stadium • Davis, CA

- Date: October 11
- Game time: 4:00 p.m. PDT
- Game attendance: 9,937
- Referee: Spencer Mumford
- TV: ESPN+

Game information

First quarter

- UCD – Hunter Ridley 42-yard field goal, 7:20. Aggies 3–0. Drive: 6 plays, 29 yards, 2:41.
- NAU – Kolbe Katsis 20-yard pass from Ty Pennington (Samuel Hunsaker kick), 0:00. Lumberjacks 7–3. Drive: 13 plays, 65 yards, 7:12.

Second quarter

- UCD – Samuel Gbatu Jr. 31-yard pass from Caden Pinnick (Hunter Ridley kick), 7:55. Aggies 10–7. Drive: 5 plays, 90 yards, 2:11.

Third quarter

- UCD – Jordan Fisher 59-yard run (Hunter Ridley kick), 14:15. Aggies 17–7. Drive: 2 plays, 65 yards, 0:45.
- NAU – Quran Gossett 7-yard run (Samuel Hunsaker kick), 10:52. Aggies 17–14. Drive: 6 plays, 62 yards, 3:16.
- UCD – Carter Vargas 50-yard pass from Caden Pinnick (Hunter Ridley kick), 8:12. Aggies 24–14. Drive: 6 plays, 75 yards, 2:40.
- NAU – Samuel Hunsaker 32-yard field goal, 1:53. Aggies 24–17. Drive: 12 plays, 51 yards, 6:14.

Fourth quarter

- UCD – Samuel Gbatu. Jr 4-yard pass from Caden Pinick (Hunter Ridley kick), 11:53. Aggies 31–17. Drive: 13 plays, 75 yards, 5:00.
- NAU – Quran Gossett 4-yard run (Samuel Hunsaker kick), 10:44. Aggies 31–24. Drive: 4 plays, 48 yards, 1:00.
- UCD – Stacy Dobbins 10-yard pass from Caden Pinnick (Hunter Ridley kick), 6:53. Aggies 38–24. Drive: 6 plays, 47 yards, 3:20.
- UCD – Mitchell Dixon 7-yard pass from Caden Pinnick (Hunter Ridley kick), 1:55. Aggies 45–24. Drive: 10 plays, 55 yards, 4:03.

Statistics	NAU	UCD
First downs	21	22
Plays–yards	71–410	61–458
Rushes–yards	42–165	32–110
Passing yards	245	348
Passing: Comp–Att–Int	18–29–0	25–29–0
Turnovers	3	1
Time of possession	34:46	25:14

Team	Category	Player	Statistics
Northern Arizona	Passing	Ty Pennington	18/28, 245 yards, TD
Northern Arizona	Rushing	Quran Gossett	8 carries, 66 yards, 2 TD
Northern Arizona	Receiving	Isaiah Eastman	7 receptions, 135 yards
UC Davis	Passing	Caden Pinnick	25/29, 348 yards, 5 TD
UC Davis	Rushing	Jordan Fisher	14 carries, 104 yards, TD
UC Davis	Receiving	Samuel Gbatu Jr.	7 receptions, 114 yards, 2 TD

=== at Northern Colorado ===
No. 6 UC Davis Aggies (5–1) at Northern Colorado Bears (3–4) – Game summary

Quarter	1	2	3	4	Total
No. 6 Aggies	3	21	0	3	27
Bears	0	7	6	3	16

at Nottingham Field • Greeley, CO

- Date: October 25
- Game time: 12:00 p.m. PDT
- Game attendance: 4,412
- Referee: Jim Crowley
- TV: ESPN+

Game information

First quarter

- UCD – Hunter Ridley 40-yard field goal, 2:10. Aggies 3–0. Drive: 10 plays, 52 yards, 3:37.

Second quarter

- UCD – Jordan Fisher 24-yard pass from Grant Harper (Hunter Ridley kick), 14:53. Aggies 10–0. Drive: 2 plays, 31 yards, 0:37.
- UCD – Samuel Gbatu Jr. 34-yard pass from Grant Harper (Hunter Ridley kick), 9:46. Aggies 17–0. Drive: 6 plays, 84 yards, 3:16.
- UCD – Laviel Pickett 18-yard pass from Grant Harper (Hunter Ridley kick), 3:58. Aggies 24–0. Drive: 3 plays, 52 yards, 1:31.
- UNCO – Brayden Munroe 51-yard pass from Eric Gibson Jr. (Jacob Willig kick), 0:24. Aggies 24–7. Drive: 3 plays, 80 yards, 0:26.

Third quarter

- UNCO – Brandon Johnson 2-yard run (Jacob Willig kick BLOCKED), 2:56. Aggies 24–13. Drive: 2 plays, 9 yards, 0:43.

Fourth quarter

- UNCO – Jacob Willig 29-yard field goal, 7:50. Aggies 24–16. Drive: 8 plays, 45 yards, 4:20.
- UCD – Hunter Ridley 41-yard field goal, 0:50. Aggies 27–16. Drive: 15 plays, 45 yards, 7:00.

Statistics	UCD	UNCO
First downs	22	18
Plays–yards	70–452	67–345
Rushes–yards	39–236	22–76
Passing yards	216	269
Passing: Comp–Att–Int	15–31–2	31–45–1
Turnovers	2	2
Time of possession	29:46	30:14

Team	Category	Player	Statistics
UC Davis	Passing	Grant Harper	15/31, 216 yards, 3 TD, 2 INT
UC Davis	Rushing	Carter Vargas	16 carries, 90 yards
UC Davis	Receiving	Samuel Gbatu Jr.	5 receptions, 108 yards, TD
Northern Colorado	Passing	Eric Gibson Jr.	31/45, 269 yards, TD, INT
Northern Colorado	Rushing	Brandon Johnson	9 carries, 65 yards, TD
Northern Colorado	Receiving	Brayden Munroe	8 receptions, 100 yards, TD

=== Idaho State ===
Idaho State Bengals (2–6) at No. 6 UC Davis Aggies (6–1) – Game summary

Quarter	1	2	3	4	Total
Bengals	14	14	7	3	38
No. 6 Aggies	13	14	6	3	36

at UC Davis Health Stadium • Davis, CA

- Date: November 1
- Game time: 1:00 p.m. PDT
- Game weather: Sunny, 74 °F (23 °C)
- Game attendance: 10,973
- Referee: Jeff Rink
- TV: ESPN+

Game information

First quarter

- IDST – Dason Brooks 57-yard run (Trajan Sinatra kick), 13:33. Bengals 7–0. Drive: 4 plays, 75 yards, 1:27.
- UCD – Carter Vargas 2-yard run (kick blocked), 9:51. Bengals 7–6. Drive: 8 plays, 77 yards, 3:36.
- IDST – Tsion Nunnally 2-yard pass from Jordan Cooke (Trajan Sinatra kick), 6:26. Bengals 14–6. Drive: 9 plays, 74 yards, 3:18.
- UCD – Laviel Pickett 4-yard pass from Caden Pinnick (Hunter Ridley kick), 1:44. Bengals 14–13. Drive: 9 plays, 58 yards, 4:33.

Second quarter

- IDST – Dason Brooks 15-yard run (Trajan Sinatra kick), 14:54. Bengals 21–13. Drive: 7 plays, 85 yards, 1:48.
- UCD – Carter Vargas 7-yard run (Hunter Ridley kick), 12:25. Bengals 21–20. Drive: 6 plays, 75 yards, 2:29.
- IDST – Aidan Garcia 16-yard blocked punt return (Trajan Sinatra kick), 7:02. Bengals 28–20.
- UCD – Zach Jones 11-yard run (Hunter Ridley kick), 3:26. Bengals 28–27. Drive: 7 plays, 75 yards, 3:36.

Third quarter

- UCD – Hunter Ridley 23-yard field goal, 10:09. Aggies 30–28. Drive: 10 plays, 70 yards, 4:51.
- IDST – Michael Shulikov 35-yard pass from Jordan Cooke (Trajan Sinatra kick), 6:59. Bengals 35–30. Drive: 7 plays, 75 yards, 3:10.
- UCD – Hunter Ridley 26-yard field goal, 0:55. Bengals 35–33. Drive: 12 plays, 67 yards, 6:04.

Fourth quarter

- UCD – Hunter Ridley 46-yard field goal, 2:56. Aggies 36–35. Drive: 10 plays, 52 yards, 4:44.
- IDST – Trajan Sinatra 50-yard field goal, 0:52. Bengals 38–36. Drive: 7 plays, 35 yards, 2:00.

Statistics	IDST	UCD
First downs	22	33
Plays–yards	65–471	79–567
Rushes–yards	29–219	47–242
Passing yards	252	325
Passing: Comp–Att–Int	21–36–2	23–32–2
Turnovers	2	3
Time of possession	23:18	36:42

Team	Category	Player	Statistics
Idaho State	Passing	Jordan Cooke	21/36, 252 yards, 2 TD, 2 INT
Idaho State	Rushing	Dason Brooks	24 carries, 219 yards, 2 TD
Idaho State	Receiving	Tsion Nunnally	9 receptions, 119 yards, TD
UC Davis	Passing	Caden Pinnick	23/32, 325 yards, TD, 2 INT
UC Davis	Rushing	Jordan Fisher	22 carries, 108 yards
UC Davis	Receiving	Samuel Gbatu Jr.	6 receptions, 112 yards

=== at Idaho ===
No. 11 UC Davis Aggies (6–2) at Idaho Vandals (4–5) – Game summary

Quarter	1	2	3	4	Total
No. 11 Aggies	14	7	7	0	28
Vandals	0	7	0	7	14

at Kibbie Dome • Moscow, ID

- Date: November 8
- Game time: 4:00 p.m. PDT
- Game weather: Sunny
- Game attendance: 10,712
- Referee: Kelly Holman
- TV announcers (ESPN+): Austin Getz (play-by-play) and Brian Strandley (analyst)

Game information

First quarter

- UCD - Ian Simpson 11-yard pass from Caden Pinnick (Hunter Ridley kick), 10:25. Aggies 7-0. Drive: 5 plays, 66 yards, 2:23.
- UCD - Samuel Gbatu Jr. 8-yard pass from Caden Pinnick (Hunter Ridley kick), 4:20. Aggies 14-0. Drive: 9 plays, 70 yards, 3:47.

Second quarter

- IDHO - Michael Graves 68-yard pass from Joshua Wood (Owen Forsman kick), 14:49. Aggies 14-7. Drive: 2 plays, 75 yards, 0:44.
- UCD - Caden Pinnick 22-yard run (Hunter Ridley kick), 2:17. Aggies 21-7. Drive: 10 plays, 94 yards, 4:00.

Third quarter

- UCD - Stacy Dobbins 3-yard pass from Caden Pinnick (Hunter Ridley kick), 8:29. Aggies 28-7. Drive: 5 plays, 44 yards, 1:57.

Fourth quarter

- IDHO - Michael Graves 35-yard pass from Joshua Wood (Owen Forsman kick), 11:35. Aggies 28-14. Drive: 5 plays, 94 yards, 1:43.

Statistics	UCD	IDHO
First downs	25	18
Plays–yards	68–448	65–430
Rushes–yards	41–200	26–133
Passing yards	248	297
Passing: Comp–Att–Int	21-27-2	20-39-1
Turnovers	2	2
Time of possession	32:03	27:57

Team	Category	Player	Statistics
UC Davis	Passing	Caden Pinnick	21/27, 248 yards, 3 TD, 2 INT
UC Davis	Rushing	Jordan Fisher	21 carries, 103 yards
UC Davis	Receiving	Samuel Gbatu Jr.	7 receptions, 110 yards, TD
Idaho	Passing	Joshua Wood	20/38, 297 yards, 2 TD, INT
Idaho	Rushing	Elisha Cummings	10 carries, 52 yards
Idaho	Receiving	Michael Graves	3 receptions, 112 yards, 2 TD

=== at No. 3 Montana State ===
No. 9 UC Davis Aggies (7–2) at No. 3 Montana State Bobcats (8–2) – Game summary

Quarter	1	2	3	4	Total
No. 9 Aggies	7	0	0	10	17
No. 3 Bobcats	0	14	10	14	38

at Bobcat Stadium • Bozeman, MT

- Date: November 15
- Game time: 7:15 p.m. PDT
- Game weather: Clear, 43 °F (6 °C)
- Game attendance: 21,777
- Referee: Jim Crowley
- TV announcers (ESPN2): Courtney Lyle (play by play) and Rene Ingoglia (analyst)

Game information

First quarter

- UCD – Ian Simpson 29-yard pass from Caden Pinnick (Hunter Ridley kick), 6:00. Aggies 7–0. Drive: 6 plays, 73 yards, 2:55.

Second quarter

- MTST – Justin Lamson 3-yard run (Myles Sansted kick), 14:00. Tied 7–7. Drive: 7 plays, 80 yards, 3:05.
- MTST – Chris Long 18-yard pass from Justin Lamson (Myles Sansted kick), 1:38. Bobcats 14–7. Drive: 6 plays, 63 yards, 1:52.

Third quarter

- MTST – Myles Sansted 28-yard field goal, 9:09. Bobcats 17–7. Drive: 8 plays, 56 yards, 3:58.
- MTST – Caden Dowler 83-yard interception return (Myles Sansted kick), 4:22. Bobcats 24–7.

Fourth quarter

- UCD – Hunter Ridley 36-yard field goal, 14:57. Bobcats 24–10. Drive: 9 plays, 57 yards, 4:25.
- MTST – Julius Davis 1-yard run (Myles Sansted kick), 8:09. Bobcats 31–10. Drive: 10 plays, 12 yards, 2:43.
- UCD – Samuel Gbatu Jr. 10-yard pass from Caden Pinnick (Hunter Ridley kick), 3:50. Bobcats 31–17. Drive: 8 plays, 75 yards, 4:19.
- MTST – Justin Lamson 18-yard run (Myles Sansted kick), 1:53. Bobcats 38–17. Drive: 5 plays, 75 yards, 1:57.

Statistics	UCD	MTST
First downs	28	15
Plays–yards	83–424	50–377
Rushes–yards	46–190	32–233
Passing yards	234	144
Passing: Comp–Att–Int	22–37–2	10–18–0
Turnovers	2	0
Time of possession	37:14	22:46

Team	Category	Player	Statistics
UC Davis	Passing	Caden Pinnick	22/36, 234 yards, 2 TD, 2 INT
UC Davis	Rushing	Jordan Fisher	17 carries, 76 yards
UC Davis	Receiving	Samuel Gbatu Jr.	10 receptions, 80 yards, TD
Montana State	Passing	Justin Lamson	10/18, 144 yards, TD
Montana State	Rushing	Justin Lamson	11 carries, 97 yards, 2 TD
Montana State	Receiving	Taco Dowler	5 receptions, 78 yards

=== Sacramento State (Causeway Classic) ===
Sacramento State Hornets (7–4) at No. 15 UC Davis Aggies (7–3) – Game summary

Quarter	1	2	3	4	Total
Hornets	0	14	13	0	27
No. 15 Aggies	14	3	0	14	31

at UC Davis Health Stadium • Davis, CA

- Date: November 22
- Game time: 1:00 p.m. PDT
- Game attendance: 14,590
- Referee: Robert Quello
- TV: ESPN+

Game information

First quarter

- UCD – Jordan Fisher 1-yard run (Hunter Ridley kick), 9:53. Aggies 7–0. Drive: 7 plays, 46 yards, 3:16.
- UCD – Jordan Fisher 2-yard run (Hunter Ridley kick), 0:06. Aggies 14–0. Drive: 9 plays, 62 yards, 3:36.

Second quarter

- SAC – Rodney Hammond Jr. 1-yard run (Grant Meadors kick), 7:57. Aggies 14–7. Drive: 15 plays, 66 yards, 7:03.
- SAC – Cardell Williams 1-yard run (Grant Meadors kick), 2:35. Tied 14–14. Drive: 6 plays, 15 yards, 2:37.
- UCD – Hunter Ridley 24-yard field goal, 0:00. Aggies 17–14. Drive: 10 plays, 55 yards, 2:30.

Third quarter

- SAC – Rodney Hammond Jr. 40-yard run (Grant Meadors kick failed), 9:28. Hornets 20–17. Drive: 4 plays, 71 yards, 1:44.
- SAC – Jamar Curtis 1-yard run (Grant Meadors kick), 1:12. Hornets 27–17. Drive: 12 plays, 64 yards, 6:17.

Fourth quarter

- UCD – Jordan Fisher 3-yard pass from Caden Pinnick (Hunter Ridley kick), 14:31. Hornets 27–24. Drive: 5 plays, 75 yards, 1:41.
- UCD – Samuel Gbatu Jr. 30-yard pass from Caden Pinnick (Hunter Ridley kick), 6:14. Aggies 31–27. Drive: 3 plays, 61 yards, 0:54.

Statistics	SAC	UCD
First downs	22	22
Plays–yards	74–343	59–406
Rushes–yards	65–326	29–100
Passing yards	17	306
Passing: Comp–Att–Int	3–9–1	24–30–0
Turnovers	1	2
Time of possession	35:09	24:51

Team	Category	Player	Statistics
Sacramento State	Passing	Cardell Williams	3/9, 17 yards, INT
Sacramento State	Rushing	Rodney Hammond Jr.	22 carries, 140 yards, 2 TD
Sacramento State	Receiving	Ernest Campbell	1 reception, 11 yards
UC Davis	Passing	Caden Pinnick	24/30, 306 yards, 2 TD
UC Davis	Rushing	Jordan Fisher	16 carries, 48 yards, 2 TD
UC Davis	Receiving	Samuel Gbatu Jr.	7 receptions, 127 yards, TD

=== vs. No. 8 Rhode Island (Division I Second Round) ===
2025 NCAA Division I FCS Playoffs Second Round
No. 8 (9) Rhode Island Rams (11–2) at No. 11 (8) UC Davis Aggies (8–3) – Game summary

Quarter	1	2	3	4	Total
No. 8 (9) Rams	0	20	0	6	26
No. 11 (8) Aggies	3	15	15	14	47

at UC Davis Health Stadium • Davis, CA

- Date: December 6
- Game time: 7:00 PM PST
- Game weather: Fog • Temperature: 48 °F (9 °C) • Wind: NW at 5 miles per hour (8.0 km/h)
- Game attendance: 8,525
- Referee: John Shay
- TV announcers (ESPN2): Chris Sylvester (play-by-play) and Craig Haubert (analyst)

Game information

First quarter

- UCD – Hunter Ridley 37-yard field goal, 11:27. Aggies 3–0. Drive: 12 plays, 50 yards, 3:33.

Second quarter

- URI – Antwain Littleton Jr. 2-yard run (Garth White kick), 9:55. Rams 7–3. Drive: 9 plays, 80 yards, 5:01.
- UCD – Scott Nixon 3-yard pass from Caden Pinnick (Ian Simpson run), 7:55. Aggies 11–7. Drive: 4 plays, 75 yards, 2:00.
- URI – Antwain Littleton Jr. 63-yard run (Garth White kick), 7:05. Rams 14–11. Drive: 2 plays, 68 yards, 0:41.
- URI – Marquis Buchanan 75-yard pass from Devin Farrell (Garth White kick BLOCKED), 2:20. Rams 20–11. Drive: 6 plays, 86 yards, 1:53.
- UCD – Zach Jones 15-yard pass from Caden Pinnick (Hunter Ridley kick), 0:18. Rams 20–18. Drive: 10 plays, 82 yards, 1:56.

Third quarter

- UCD – Jordan Fisher 50-yard run (Hunter Ridley kick), 12:34. Aggies 25–20. Drive: 2 plays, 56 yards, 0:41.
- UCD – Ian Simpson 9-yard pass from Caden Pinnick (Jordan Fisher run), 7:32. Aggies 33–20. Drive: 2 plays, 17 yards, 0:30.

Fourth quarter

- UCD – Samuel Gbatu Jr. 27-yard pass from Caden Pinnick (Hunter Ridley kick), 14:54. Aggies 40–20. Drive: 9 plays, 84 yards, 4:49.
- UCD – Zach Jones 35-yard pass from Caden Pinnick (Hunter Ridley kick), 3:31. Aggies 47–20. Drive: 5 plays, 76 yards, 3:11.
- URI – Marquis Buchanan 4-yard pass from Devin Farrell (pass failed), 1:11. Aggies 47–26. Drive: 11 plays, 73 yards, 2:14.

Statistics	URI	UCD
First downs	17	25
Plays–yards	67–467	72–553
Rushes–yards	27–173	43–276
Passing yards	294	277
Passing: Comp–Att–Int	22–40–0	17–29–1
Turnovers	1	1
Time of possession	29:35	30:25

Team	Category	Player	Statistics
Rhode Island	Passing	Devin Farrell	22/40, 294 yards, 2 TD
Rhode Island	Rushing	Antwain Littleton Jr.	16 carries, 123 yards, 2 TD
Rhode Island	Receiving	Marquis Buchanan	5 receptions, 113 yards, 2 TD
UC Davis	Passing	Caden Pinnick	17/29, 277 yards, 5 TD, INT
UC Davis	Rushing	Jordan Fisher	16 carries, 140 yards, TD
UC Davis	Receiving	Samuel Gbatu Jr.	4 receptions, 121 yards, TD

=== vs. No. 17т Illinois State (Division I Quarterfinal) ===
2025 NCAA Division I FCS Playoffs Quarterfinal
No. 17т Illinois State Redbirds (10–4) at No. 11 (8) UC Davis Aggies (9–3) – Game summary

Quarter	1	2	3	4	Total
No. 17т Redbirds	21	0	14	7	42
No. 11 (8) Aggies	17	0	0	14	31

at UC Davis Health Stadium • Davis, CA

- Date: December 13
- Game time: 4:00 PM
- Game weather: Fog • Temperature: 41 °F (5 °C) • Wind: NE at 3 miles per hour (4.8 km/h)
- Game attendance: 9,216
- Referee: James Brookhart
- TV announcers (ESPN+): Ted Emrich (play-by-play), Rene Ingoglia (analyst)
- Box score

Game information

First quarter

- UCD – Hunter Ridley 35–yard field goal, 13:42. Aggies 3–0. Drive: 5 plays, 57 yards, 1:18.
- ILST – Chris Taylor 91–yard kickoff return (Matt Maldonado kick), 13:30. Redbirds 7–3.
- UCD – Jordan Fisher 23–yard run (Hunter Ridley kick), 11:34. Aggies 10–7. Drive: 6 plays, 75 yards, 1:568.
- ILST – Dylan Lord 37–yard pass from Tommy Rittenhouse (Matt Maldonado kick), 8:49. Redbirds 14–10. Drive: 6 plays, 67 yards, 2:38.
- ILST – Daniel Sobkowicz 93–yard pass from Tommy Rittenhouse (Matt Maldonado kick), 4:21. Redbirds 21–10. Drive: 1 plays, 93 yards, 0:13.
- UCD – Stacy Dobbins 12–yard pass from Caden Pinnick (Hunter Ridley kick), 1:44. Redbirds 21–17. Drive: 7 plays, 59 yards, 2:30.

Second quarter

- No scoring plays.

Third quarter

- ILST – Seth Glatz 1-yard run (Mat Maldonado kick), 9:48. Redbirds 28-17. Drive: 9 plays, 75 yards, 5:12.
- ILST – Daniel Sobkowicz 17–yard pass from Tommy Rittenhouse (Matt Maldonado kick), 2:06. Redbirds 35–17. Drive: 11 plays, 80 yards, 6:50.

Fourth quarter

- ILST – Seth Glatz 58-yard run (Matt Maldonado kick), 3:35. Redbirds 42-17. Drive: 10 plays, 94 yards, 5:59.
- UCD – Jordan Fisher 1–yard pass from Caden Pinnick (pass failed), 2:11. Redbirds 42–23. Drive: 4 plays, 25 yards, 1:13.
- UCD – Stacy Dobbins 24–yard pass from Caden Pinnick (Caden Pinnick–Jordan Fisher pass), 0:47. Redbirds 42–31. Drive: 7 plays, 53 yards, 1:21.

Statistics	ILST	UCD
First downs	26	24
Plays–yards	63–532	65–533
Rushes–yards	42–266	24–131
Passing yards	266	402
Passing: Comp–Att–Int	15–21–1	29–41–1
Turnovers	1	2
Time of possession	35:45	24:15

Team	Category	Player	Statistics
Illinois State	Passing	Tommy Rittenhouse	15/20, 266 yards, 3 TD, INT
Illinois State	Rushing	Victor Dawson	29 carries, 148 yards
Illinois State	Receiving	Daniel Sobkowicz	6 receptions, 150 yards, 2 TD
UC Davis	Passing	Caden Pinnick	29/41, 402 yards, 3 TD, INT
UC Davis	Rushing	Jordan Fisher	13 carries, 70 yards, TD
UC Davis	Receiving	Stacy Dobbins	10 receptions, 121 yards, 2 TD

== Ranking movements ==
Ranking movements Legend: ██ Increase in ranking ██ Decrease in ranking
	Week														
Poll	Pre	1	2	3	4	5	6	7	8	9	10	11	12	13	Final
STATS FCS	8	8	9	9	9	7	6	6	6	6	11	9	15	11	8
Coaches	7	5	9	9	8	7	6	6	6	6	12	10	14	11	8
