= Eli Gillman =

American football player (born 2003)

No. 10 – Montana Grizzlies
- Position: Running back
- Class: (redshirt) Senior

Personal information
- Born: November 17, 2003 (age 22)
- Listed height: 6 ft 0 in (1.83 m)
- Listed weight: 213 lb (97 kg)

Career information
- High school: Dassel-Cokato (Cokato, Minnesota)
- College: Montana (2022–present)

Awards and highlights
- Big Sky Offensive Player of the Year (2025); Jerry Rice Award (2023); Big Sky Freshman of the Year (2023); First-team All-Big Sky (2025); 2× Second-team All-Big Sky (2023, 2024)
- Stats at ESPN

Eli Gillman (born November 17, 2003) is an American college football running back for the Montana Grizzlies. He won the 2023 Jerry Rice Award.

== Early life ==
Gillman attended Dassel-Cokato Senior High in Cokato, Minnesota. As a senior, he had 43 touchdowns and ran for more than 1,900 yards, leading Dassel Cokato High to its first state championship. Gillman committed to play college football at the University of Montana over offers from Central Michigan, Northern Iowa, North Dakota, South Dakota, Georgetown, and Dartmouth.

== College career ==
Gillman had the most rushing yards by a freshman in the University of Montana's history and won the Jerry Rice Award. He also had the longest touchdown run in the program's history.

As a sophomore, he racked up 175 yards and a touchdown in a win over Western Carolina. For the season he had more than 1,000 yards rushing and 15 rushing touchdowns.

In September 2025, he had 198 rushing yards and 3 touchdowns from 15 carries against Central Washington. In October 2025 he rushed for 123 yards and two touchdowns against Cal Poly.

=== Statistics ===
| Year | Team | Games | | Rushing | | | | Receiving | | | |
| Year | Team | GP | GS | Att | Yds | Avg | TD | Rec | Yds | Avg | TD |
|---|---|---|---|---|---|---|---|---|---|---|---|
| 2022 | Montana | 2 | 0 | 8 | 65 | 8.1 | 1 | 1 | 5 | 5.0 | 0 |
| 2023 | Montana | 15 | 14 | 194 | 968 | 5.0 | 12 | 19 | 140 | 7.4 | 0 |
| 2024 | Montana | 14 | 9 | 167 | 1,104 | 6.6 | 15 | 18 | 176 | 9.8 | 2 |
| 2025 | Montana | 12 | 12 | 192 | 1,261 | 6.6 | 17 | 26 | 165 | 6.3 | 2 |
| Career | | 43 | 35 | 561 | 3,398 | 6.1 | 45 | 64 | 486 | 7.6 | 4 |

== Personal life ==
Gillman's mother is Dawn Gillman, who is a member of the Minnesota House of Representatives.
