= Caden Pinnick =

American football player

No. 12 – Washington State Cougars
- Position: Quarterback
- Class: Redshirt Sophomore

Personal information
- Born: Denver, Colorado, U.S.
- Listed height: 6 ft 0 in (1.83 m)
- Listed weight: 192 lb (87 kg)

Career information
- High school: Del Oro (Loomis, California)
- College: UC Davis (2024–2025); Washington State (2026–present)

Awards and highlights
- FCS First-team Freshman All-American (2025); Big Sky Freshman of the Year (2025)
- Stats at ESPN

Caden Pinnick is an American college football quarterback for the Washington State Cougars. He previously played for the UC Davis Aggies.

== Early life ==
Pinnick was born in Denver, Colorado, to Heidi Pinnick, and is of Taiwanese descent. A native of Roseville, California, he grew up considering LeBron James as his sports hero and played the piano for 15 years. Pinnick also looked up to his cousin, Stone Smartt, who starred at quarterback for Del Oro High School in Loomis, California, inspiring him to play the position. "Growing up, coming here and seeing the lights, I wanted to be that guy," he later said in 2022. "I wanted to be that Stone Smartt on the field. Now that it's here, it's surreal. It's me taking it in."

== High school career ==
Pinnick attended Del Oro High School in Loomis, California. Over his high school career, he passed for 4,625 yards and 57 touchdowns and rushed for 657 yards and 13 touchdowns as the football team's quarterback. Pinnick began his junior year as the backup before earning the starting role during the season, throwing for 1,679 yards and 22 touchdowns and guiding the Golden Eagles to the CIF Sac-Joaquin Section Division II semi-finals. He earned first-team all-metro honors from The Sacramento Bee, and was named both the Sierra Foothill League Offensive MVP and the Auburn Journal boys athlete of the year. As a senior, Pinnick passed for 2,946 yards and 30 touchdowns and rushed for 489 yards and nine touchdowns, once again leading Del Oro to the sectional semi-final. He was named the Large School Player of the Year by The Sacramento Bee; he also won the Sierra Foothill League Offensive MVP award for the second year in a row.

Aside from football, Pinnick emerged as a key starter on the basketball team as a sophomore and averaged 15 points per game, receiving all-metro honorable mention from The Sacramento Bee. As a junior, he averaged a team-high 19 points per game, garnering fourth-team all-metro and first-team all-league honors. As a senior, Pinnick improved his scoring average to 21.4 points per game and led Del Oro to the CIF Sac-Joaquin Section Division II title game, as well as the semi-finals of the CIF NorCal Regional Division II tournament. He was named a first-team all-metro selection, as well as the Sierra Foothill League Co-MVP, and finished his high school career with over 1,000 points. Pinnick also played baseball as an outfielder.

=== Recruiting ===
Pinnick was rated as a three-star recruit and the 150th-best quarterback in the 2024 class, according to 247Sports. His first college football offer was from Brown, followed by another from Sacramento State. Pinnick verbally committed to UC Davis on January 18, 2024, citing the school's academic and athletic opportunities, as well as his strong relationship with head coach Tim Plough. He signed his National Letter of Intent the following month on National Signing Day, committing to play both college football and college baseball at UC Davis. "There's just kind of a local legend around Caden," said Plough. "He's a great quarterback, but also one of the best point guards in the area and likely to be taken in the Major League Baseball draft. We just couldn't pass up that much talent."

== College career ==
=== UC Davis ===
As a freshman in 2024, Pinnick played in one game, appearing in a win over Northern Colorado on November 2. He took a redshirt for the season. Pinnick also redshirted his freshman baseball season.

==== 2025 season ====
Following the graduation of three-year starter Miles Hastings, Pinnick competed against Grant Harper for the starting job in 2025, bolstering his case with a strong showing in spring camp. Following his performance in the Spring Game, Plough described Pinnick as "a really special player" with "a really good chance of being a unique leader". He was named the starter by Plough on the week of their season opener against Mercer in the FCS Kickoff. Pinnick passed for a touchdown and ran for another, but the game was suspended in the fourth quarter due to lightning and subsequently declared a no contest, with all statistics voided. In his first official start the following week, he threw for 253 yards and three touchdowns in a 31–24 win over Utah Tech, earning Stats Perform FCS National Freshman of the Week honors.

In the Big Sky Conference opener, Pinnick threw for 288 yards and two touchdowns to go with one rushing touchdown in a 34–12 win over Weber State, earning Big Sky Offensive Player of the Week honors. The following week, he threw for 313 yards and three touchdowns, and rushed for 60 yards and a touchdown, in a 34–27 win over Cal Poly in the Battle for the Golden Horseshoe; he was named the Big Sky co-Offensive Player of the Week. Pinnick won the award for a record-tying third week in a row after completing 25-of-29 passes for 348 yards and five touchdowns in a 45–24 win over Northern Arizona. He was also named the FCS Nation Radio National Offensive Player of the Week. On November 8, Pinnick threw for 248 yards and three touchdowns to go with one rushing touchdown in a 28–14 win over Idaho. On November 22, he passed for 306 yards and two touchdowns in a 31–27 win over rival Sacramento State, which was described by The Sacramento Bee as "one of the best Causeway Classic games in the 71-year history of the series".

In the second round of the FCS playoffs, Pinnick passed for 277 yards and five touchdowns to go with 99 rushing yards in a 47–26 win over Rhode Island. He then threw for 402 yards and three touchdowns in a 42–31 quarterfinal loss to Illinois State, setting a new career-high in passing yards. On the season, Pinnick led UC Davis to a 9–4 record and threw for 3,206 yards and 32 touchdowns, to go with 437 yards for three touchdowns on the ground. He was unanimously selected as the Big Sky Freshman of the Year, and received All-Big Sky honorable mention. Pinnick was also a finalist for the Jerry Rice Award, and garnered first-team FCS Freshman All-America honors from FCS Football Central and Stats Perform.

=== Washington State ===
Pinnick reportedly received multiple offers to transfer out of UC Davis for 2026. He entered the NCAA transfer portal on January 2 and visited the University of Colorado soon afterwards. On January 6, Pinnick committed to transfer to Washington State University to play for the Washington State Cougars under new head coach Kirby Moore.

=== College statistics ===
Season	Team	Games			Passing								Rushing			
Season	Team	GP	GS	Record	Cmp	Att	Pct	Yds	Avg	TD	Int	Rtg	Att	Yds	Avg	TD
2024	UC Davis	0	0	—	Redshirted (redshirt)											
2025	UC Davis	12	12	9–3	240	345	69.6	3,206	9.3	32	10	172.4	125	437	3.5	3
2026	Washington State	6	6	1–5	110	178	61.8	952	5.3	3	5	106.3	74	194	2.6	3
Career		18	18	10–8	350	523	66.9	4,158	8.0	35	15	150.1	199	631	3.2	6
