= Kealiʻi Ah Yat =

American football player

No. 8 – Montana Grizzlies
- Position: Quarterback
- Class: Redshirt Sophomore

Personal information
- Listed height: 6 ft 1 in (1.85 m)
- Listed weight: 192 lb (87 kg)

Career information
- College: Montana (2023–present)
- Stats at ESPN

Kealiʻi Ah Yat is American college football quarterback for the Montana Grizzlies.

He is from Kaneohe, Hawaii, and attended Kamehameha Schools. In 2025 he was a redshirt sophomore for the Grizzlies and in October was named Big Sky Player of the Week. He wears #8. He and teammate Michael Wortham were finalists for the Walter Payton Award in 2025.

His father is Brian Ah Yat who led Montana to the 1996 NCAA Division I-AA National Championship Game, was an All-America quarterback, played professionally in Canada, and is in the Grizzly Sports Hall of Fame. Offensive coordinator Brian Pease coached both players at Montana. Tehanee Ah Yat is his mother.

In 2025, he passed for 3,819 yards with 32 touchdowns and 8 interceptions. He led his team to the FCS semi-finals beating South Dakota State in the second round 50–29 and passing for four touchdowns, and then defeating South Dakota 52–22 in the quarterfinals. His team won 13 games in 2025, losing only twice, both times to Montana State, first in the de facto Big Sky championship losing 31–28 and in the FCS semi-finals in Bozeman 48–23.

== Statistics ==
Season	Team	Games			Passing								Rushing			
Season	Team	GP	GS	Record	Cmp	Att	Pct	Yds	Y/A	TD	Int	Rtg	Att	Yds	Avg	TD
2023	Montana	5	0	—	26	38	68.4	271	7.1	1	0	137.0	7	−15	−2.1	0
2024	Montana	11	6	4–2	113	190	59.5	1,111	5.8	7	6	114.4	57	159	2.8	7
2025	Montana	15	15	13–2	325	470	69.1	4,070	8.7	33	9	161.2	68	67	1.0	8
Career		31	21	17–4	464	698	66.5	5,452	7.8	41	15	147.2	132	211	1.6	15
