= 2025 Utah Utes football team =

American college football season

2025 Utah Utes football

Las Vegas Bowl champion

Las Vegas Bowl, W 44–22 vs. Nebraska
- Conference: Big 12 Conference

Ranking
- Coaches: No. 14
- AP: No. 14
- Record: 11–2 (7–2 Big 12)
- Head coach: Kyle Whittingham (21st season); Morgan Scalley (bowl game)
- Offensive coordinator: Jason Beck (1st season)
- Offensive scheme: Power spread
- Defensive coordinator: Morgan Scalley (10th season)
- Base defense: 4–2–5
- Home stadium: Rice–Eccles Stadium

2025 Big 12 Conference football standings
	Conf.			Overall
Team	W		L	W		L
No. 7 Texas Tech y$^	8	–	1	12	–	2
No. 11 BYU y	8	–	1	12	–	2
No. 14 Utah	7	–	2	11	–	2
No. 22 Houston	6	–	3	10	–	3
Arizona	6	–	3	9	–	4
Arizona State	6	–	3	8	–	5
No. 25 TCU	5	–	4	9	–	4
Iowa State	5	–	4	8	–	4
Cincinnati	5	–	4	7	–	6
Kansas State	5	–	4	6	–	6
Baylor	3	–	6	5	–	7
Kansas	3	–	6	5	–	7
UCF	2	–	7	5	–	7
West Virginia	2	–	7	4	–	8
Colorado	1	–	8	3	–	9
Oklahoma State	0	–	9	1	–	11
Championship: Texas Tech 34, BYU 7
^ – College Football Playoff participant; $ – Conference champion; y – Championship game participant; Rankings from AP Poll

The 2025 Utah Utes football team represented the University of Utah during the 2025 NCAA Division I FBS football season in their second year as a member of the Big 12 Conference. They won 11 games led by Kyle Whittingham in what ended up being his final year as their head coach after 21 years. The Utes played 6 home games at Rice–Eccles Stadium located in Salt Lake City.

The 2025 team ended the season ranked #14 in both the AP and Coaches Polls. Their exciting comeback against Kansas State was later ranked #10 in a ranking of the top 100 games of 2025. Offensive lineman Spencer Fano was a unanimous all-American and won the Outland Trophy among other accolades. Fano was subsequently selected as the 9th pick in the first round of the 2026 NFL draft by the Cleveland Browns, while his teammate, fellow tackle, Caleb Lomu, was chosen as the 28th player of the first round, by the New England Patriots in the same draft.

On December 12, Whittingham announced that he would be stepping down as the Utes' head coach following the Las Vegas Bowl. The following day, December 13, defensive coordinator Morgan Scalley was named Whittingham's successor.

== Transfers ==
=== Incoming ===
Name	Pos.	Height	Weight	Hometown	Prev. School
Devon Dampier	QB	6'2"	210 lbs	Phoenix, AZ	New Mexico
Orion Phillips	P	6'3"	176 lbs	Sydney, Australia	Missouri
Jaxson Jones	Edge	6'3"	230 lbs	Chandler, AZ	Oregon
Creed Whittemore	CB	6'0"	175 lbs	Gainesville, FL	Mississippi State
Donovan Saunders	CB	6'0"	180 lbs	Houston, TX	Texas A&M
Blake Cotton	CB	5'11"	180 lbs	Sacramento, CA	UC Davis
Kalolo Ta'aga	OT	6'5"	315 lbs	Honolulu, HI	USC
Na'Quari Rogers	RB	5'10"	195 lbs	Dallas, TX	New Mexico
Wayshawn Parker	RB	6'0"	210 lbs	Spokane, WA	Washington State
Brendan Zurbrugg	QB	6'3"	205 lbs	Alliance, OH	Oklahoma
Devin Green	RB	5'11"	205 lbs	Sacramento, CA	UNLV
Lance Holtzclaw	Edge	6'4"	225 lbs	Seattle, WA	Washington
Ryan Davis	WR	5'11"	176 lbs	Roswell, GA	New Mexico
Otto Tia	WR	6'4"	220 lbs	Layton, UT	Utah State
Nate Johnson	QB	6'0"	190 lbs	Clovis, CA	Vanderbilt
Justin Stevenson	WR	6'3"	180 lbs	Katy, TX	Wyoming
JC Hart	CB	6'2"	180 lbs	Auburn, AL	Auburn
Jaylen Moson	CB	5'11"	160 lbs	Kennesaw, GA	Furman
Larry Simmons	WR	6'1"	190 lbs	Moss Point, MS	Southern Miss
Tobias Merriweather	WR	6'4"	193 lbs	Camas, WA	California
Bryce Duke	RB	5'11"	196 lbs	Leesburg, VA	Old Dominion
Dilan Battle	DL	6'1.5"	320 lbs	Arlington, TX	LSU
Anthony Hernandez	LB	5'10"	192 lbs	Park City, UT	Northern Colorado

=== Outgoing ===
Name	Pos.	Height	Weight	Hometown	New School
Damien Alford	WR	6'5"	210 lbs	Hollywood, FL	Florida Atlantic
Jack Bouwmeester	P	6'2"	194 lbs	Sydney, Australia	Texas
Sam Huard	QB	6'2"	190 lbs	Bellevue, WA	USC
Anthony Woods	RB	5'11"	175 lbs	Palmdale, CA	UCLA
Jaylon Glover	RB	5'7"	205 lbs	Lakeland, FL	UNLV
Sione Fotu	LB	6'1"	225 lbs	South Jordan, UT	Houston
Dijon Stanley	RB	6'0"	170 lbs	Granada Hills, CA	New Mexico State
Jett Meine	WR	6'2"	195 lbs	Draper, UT	TBA
Vili Taufatofua	EDGE	6'4"	260 lbs	Mt. Roskill, NZ	San Jose State
Brandon Rose	QB	6'2"	195 lbs	Murrieta, CA	UMass
John Randle Jr.	RB	6'0"	180 lbs	Wichita, KS	Garden City CC
Isaac Wilson	QB	5'11"	190 lbs	Draper, UT	Withdrawn
CJ Blocker	CB	5'10"	160 lbs	New Caney, TX	Colorado State
Josh Calvert	LB	6'2"	217 lbs	Westlake Village, CA	TBA
Bobby Piland Jr.	DL	6'1"	305 lbs	Rocklin, CA	Cal Poly
Carsen Ryan	TE	6'4"	250 lbs	American Fork, UT	BYU
Ka'eo Akana	EDGE	6'3"	205 lbs	Honolulu, HI	Hawaii
Cameron Calhoun	CB	5'11"	185 lbs	Cincinnati, OH	Alabama
C.J. Jacobsen	TE	6'4"	223 lbs	Meridian, ID	Louisville
Simote Pepa	DT	6'3"	320 lbs	West Valley City, UT	Washington
Xane Uipi	CB	6'0"	182 lbs	Salt Lake City, UT	TBA
Helaman Ofahengaue	EDGE	6'3"	215 lbs	Lehi, UT	Utah Tech
Mycah Pittman	WR	5'11"	195 lbs	Calabasas, CA	TBA
Ben Durham	S	6'0"	195 lbs	Rancho Santa Margarita, CA	TBA
Michael Mitchell	RB	5'11"	193 lbs	Middleburg, FL	Arizona
Keanu Tanuvasa	DL	6'4"	275 lbs	Mission Viejo, CA	BYU
Taeshaun Lyons	WR	6'2"	151 lbs	Hayward, CA	UNLV
Kenan Johnson	CB	6'0"	175 lbs	Minneola, FL	Virginia
Sammie Hunter	CB	5'11"	185 lbs	Rock Hill, SC	Fresno State
Wyatt Becker	QB	6'1"	180 lbs	Pasadena, CA	Princeton
Bear Tenney	TE	6'5"	226 lbs	Lehi, UT	Sacramento State
Quimari Shemwell	CB	6'0"	175 lbs	Los Angeles, CA	California
Zacharyus Williams	WR	6'2"	195 lbs	Playa Del Rey, CA	USC
David Washington	WR	6'0"	185 lbs	Las Vegas, NV	Purdue
Jeilani Davis	S	6'1"	190 lbs	Santa Ana, CA	Montana
Cameron Mitchell-Jones	WR	5'9	165 lbs	Pasadena, CA	Pasadena City
Landen King	TE	6'5"	220 lbs	Humble, TX	Duke

== Schedule ==
Date	Time	Opponent	Rank	Site	TV	Result	Attendance
August 30	9:00 p.m.	at UCLA*		Rose Bowl; Pasadena, CA	FOX	W 43–10	35,032
September 6	4:00 p.m.	Cal Poly*	No. 25	Rice–Eccles Stadium; Salt Lake City, UT	ESPN+	W 63–9	51,463
September 13	6:00 p.m.	at Wyoming*	No. 20	War Memorial Stadium; Laramie, WY	CBSSN	W 31–6	23,500
September 20	10:00 a.m.	No. 17 Texas Tech	No. 16	Rice–Eccles Stadium; Salt Lake City, UT (Big Noon Kickoff)	FOX	L 10–34	52,236
September 27	1:30 p.m.	at West Virginia		Milan Puskar Stadium; Morgantown, WV	FOX	W 48–14	53,965
October 11	8:15 p.m.	No. 21 Arizona State		Rice–Eccles Stadium; Salt Lake City, UT	ESPN	W 42–10	51,444
October 18	6:00 p.m.	at No. 15 BYU	No. 23	LaVell Edwards Stadium; Provo, UT (Holy War, Big Noon Kickoff)	FOX	L 21–24	64,794
October 25	8:15 p.m.	Colorado^{†}		Rice–Eccles Stadium; Salt Lake City, UT (Rumble in the Rockies)	ESPN	W 53–7	51,949
November 1	8:15 p.m.	No. 17 Cincinnati	No. 24	Rice–Eccles Stadium; Salt Lake City, UT (College GameDay)	ESPN	W 45–14	51,672
November 15	5:00 p.m.	at Baylor	No. 13	McLane Stadium; Waco, TX	ESPN2	W 55–28	38,186
November 22	2:00 p.m.	Kansas State	No. 12	Rice–Eccles Stadium; Salt Lake City, UT	ESPN2	W 51–47	51,444
November 28	10:00 a.m.	at Kansas	No. 13	David Booth Kansas Memorial Stadium; Lawrence, KS	ESPN	W 31–21	32,811
December 31	1:30 p.m.	vs. Nebraska*	No. 15	Allegiant Stadium; Paradise, NV (Las Vegas Bowl)	ESPN	W 44–22	38,879
*Non-conference game; ^{†}Homecoming; Rankings from AP Poll (and CFP Rankings, after November 4) - Released prior to game; All times are in Mountain time

== Rankings ==
Ranking movements Legend: ██ Increase in ranking ██ Decrease in ranking RV = Received votes
	Week																
Poll	Pre	1	2	3	4	5	6	7	8	9	10	11	12	13	14	15	Final
AP	RV	25	20	16	RV	RV	RV	23	RV	24	17	15	13	14	15	15	14
Coaches	RV	RV	21	18	RV	25	RV	22	RV	24	19	15	14	14	15	15	14
CFP	Not released										13	13	12	13	15	15	Not released

== Game summaries ==
=== at UCLA ===
Utah Utes (0–0) at UCLA Bruins (0–0) – Game summary

Quarter	1	2	3	4	Total
Utes	13	10	7	13	43
Bruins	0	7	3	0	10

at Rose Bowl • Pasadena, California

- Date: August 30
- Game time: 8:00 p.m.
- Game weather: Partly cloudy • 85 °F (29 °C)
- Game attendance: 35,032
- Referee: Mike McCabe
- TV announcers (FOX): Connor Onion (play-by-play) and Mark Helfrich (analyst)

Game information

First quarter

- UTAH – Wayshawn Parker 13-yard run (Dillon Curtis kick failed), 10:49. Utes 6–0. Drive: 11 plays, 75 yards, 4:11.
- UTAH – Smith Snowden 8-yard run (Dillon Curtis kick), 1:27. Utes 13–0. Drive: 10 plays, 60 yards, 5:10.

Second quarter

- UTAH – Lander Barton 14-yard pass from Devon Dampier (Dillon Curtis kick), 12:44. Utes 20–0. Drive: 5 plays, 49 yards, 2:12.
- UCLA – Anthony Woods 19-yard pass from Nico Iamaleava (Mateen Bhaghani kick), 6:46. Utes 20–7. Drive: 10 plays, 75 yards, 5:58.
- UTAH – Dillon Curtis 54-yard field goal, 0:00. Utes 23–7. Drive: 8 plays, 34 yards, 1:01.

Third quarter

- UCLA – Mateen Bhaghani 46-yard field goal, 12:38. Utes 23–10. Drive: 7 plays, 47 yards, 2:22.
- UTAH – Devon Dampier 2-yard run (Dillon Curtis kick), 2:50. Utes 30–10. Drive: 21 plays, 80 yards, 9:44.

Fourth quarter

- UTAH – Dallen Bentley 2-yard pass from Devon Dampier (run failed), 10:05. Utes 36–10. Drive: 10 plays, 81 yards, 4:49.
- UTAH – NaQuari Rogers 1-yard run (Dillon Curtis kick), 6:29. Utes 43–10. Drive: 4 plays, 29 yards, 2:08.

Statistics	UTAH	UCLA
First downs	30	14
Plays–yards	80–492	50–220
Rushes–yards	54–286	28–84
Passing yards	206	136
Passing: comp–att–int	21–26–0	11–22–1
Turnovers	0	1
Time of possession	37:28	22:32

Team	Category	Player	Statistics
Utah	Passing	Devon Dampier	21/25, 206 yards, 2 TD
Utah	Rushing	Devon Dampier	16 carries, 87 yards, TD
Utah	Receiving	Smith Snowden	6 receptions, 51 yards
UCLA	Passing	Nico Iamaleava	11/22, 136 yards, TD, INT
UCLA	Rushing	Nico Iamaleava	13 carries, 47 yards
UCLA	Receiving	Anthony Woods	3 receptions, 48 yards, TD

=== vs Cal Poly (FCS) ===
Cal Poly Mustangs (FCS) (1–0) at No. 25 Utah Utes (1–0) – Game summary

Quarter	1	2	3	4	Total
Mustangs (FCS)	3	3	0	3	9
No. 25 Utes	14	21	21	7	63

at Rice–Eccles Stadium • Salt Lake City, Utah

- Date: September 6
- Game time: 4:00 p.m.
- Game weather: Rain, 69 °F (21 °C)
- Game attendance: 51,463
- Referee: Lyndon Nixon
- TV announcers (ESPN+): Mark Neely (play-by-play) and Barrett Brooks (analyst)

Game information

First quarter

- UTAH – Wayshawn Parker 52-yard pass from Devon Dampier (Dillon Curtis kick), 13:08. Utes 7–0. Drive: 6 plays, 75 yards, 1:52.
- UTAH – Jackson Bennee 46-yard interception return (Dillon Curtis kick), 7:15. Utes 14–0.
- CP – Noah Serna 30-yard field goal, 4:21. Utes 14–3. Drive: 7 plays, 63 yards, 2:54.

Second quarter

- UTAH – Ryan Davis 4-yard pass from Devon Dampier (Dillon Curtis kick), 14:20. Utes 21–3. Drive: 12 plays, 65 yards, 5:01.
- CP – Gianluca Dimauro 47-yard field goal, 7:04. Utes 21–6. Drive: 10 plays, 39 yards, 4:21.
- UTAH – NaQuari Rogers 1-yard run (Dillon Curtis kick), 1:44. Utes 28–6. Drive: 1 play, 1 yard, 0:03.
- UTAH – NaQuari Rogers 1-yard run (Dillon Curtis kick), 0:03. Utes 35–6. Drive: 6 plays, 30 yards, 0:36.

Third quarter

- UTAH – Dallen Bentley 11-yard pass from Devon Dampier (Dillon Curtis kick), 9:48. Utes 42–6. Drive: 10 plays, 70 yards, 4:14.
- UTAH – Wayshawn Parker 43-yard run (Dillon Curtis kick), 7:12. Utes 49–6. Drive: 2 plays, 50 yards, 0:36.
- UTAH – Byrd Ficklin 38-yard run (Dillon Curtis kick), 1:24. Utes 56–6. Drive: 6 plays, 95 yards, 2:45.

Fourth quarter

- CP – Noah Serna 51-yard field goal, 11:13. Utes 56–9. Drive: 9 plays, 42 yards, 5:11.
- UTAH – Byrd Ficklin 2-yard run (Dillon Curtis kick), 2:12. Utes 63–9. Drive: 15 plays, 75 yards, 9:01.

Statistics	CP	UTAH
First downs	12	24
Plays–yards	58–223	73–518
Rushes–yards	28–65	46–273
Passing yards	158	245
Passing: comp–att–int	15–30–0	21–27–0
Turnovers	2	0
Time of possession	28:45	31:15

Team	Category	Player	Statistics
Cal Poly	Passing	Ty Dieffenbach	6/9, 82 yards, INT
Cal Poly	Rushing	Anthony Grigsby Jr.	10 carries, 25 yards
Cal Poly	Receiving	Kian Salehi	3 receptions, 44 yards
Utah	Passing	Devon Dampier	17/23, 192 yards, 3 TD
Utah	Rushing	Nate Johnson	11 carries, 59 yards
Utah	Receiving	Ryan Davis	6 receptions, 58 yards, TD

=== at Wyoming ===
No. 20 Utah Utes (2–0) at Wyoming Cowboys (2–0) – Game summary

Quarter	1	2	3	4	Total
No. 20 Utes	3	0	14	14	31
Cowboys	0	0	0	6	6

at War Memorial Stadium • Laramie, Wyoming

- Date: September 13
- Game time: 6:00 p.m.
- Game weather: Cloudy • Temperature: 52 °F (11 °C) • Wind: NE 7 mph
- Game attendance: 23,500
- Referee: Christian Watson
- TV announcers (CBSSN): Rich Waltz (play-by-play), Robert Turbin (analyst), and Jordan Georgio (sideline)

Game information

First quarter

- (10:22) UTAH – Dillon Curtis 43-yard field goal (Drive: 9 plays, 48 yards, 3:46; Utah 3–0)

Second quarter

- No scoring plays.

Third quarter

- (10:46) UTAH – NaQuari Rogers 1-yard run, Dillon Curtis kick (Drive: 10 plays, 83 yards, 4:08; Utah 10–0)
- (0:23) UTAH – Larry Simmons 8-yard pass from Devon Dampier, Dillon Curtis kick (Drive: 19 plays, 78 yards, 7:23; Utah 17–0)

Fourth quarter

- (8:35) UTAH – JJ Buchanan 14-yard pass from Devon Dampier, Dillon Curtis kick (Drive: 3 plays, 18 yards, 1:23; Utah 24–0)
- (4:23) WYO – Terron Kellman 15-yard run (Drive: 8 plays, 75 yards, 4:12; Utah 24–6)
- (1:11) UTAH – Hunter Andrews 11-yard run, Dillon Curtis kick (Drive: 6 plays, 75 yards, 3:12; Utah 31–6)

Statistics	UTAH	WYO
First downs	31	15
Plays–yards	86–541	57–229
Rushes–yards	45–311	34–121
Passing yards	230	108
Passing: comp–att–int	27–41–0	12–23–1
Turnovers	1	2
Time of possession	35:30	24:30

Team	Category	Player	Statistics
Utah	Passing	Devon Dampier	27/41, 230 yards, 2 TD
Utah	Rushing	Devon Dampier	13 carries, 86 yards
Utah	Receiving	Ryan Davis	10 receptions, 91 yards
Wyoming	Passing	Kaden Anderson	12/23, 108 yards, INT
Wyoming	Rushing	Samuel Harris	8 carries, 68 yards
Wyoming	Receiving	Chris Durr	5 receptions, 40 yards

=== vs No. 17 Texas Tech ===
No. 17 Texas Tech Red Raiders (3–0) at No. 16 Utah Utes (3–0) – Game summary

Quarter	1	2	3	4	Total
No. 17 Red Raiders	7	3	0	24	34
No. 16 Utes	0	3	0	7	10

at Rice–Eccles Stadium • Salt Lake City, Utah

- Date: September 20
- Game time: 10:00 a.m.
- Game weather: Cloudy, 67 °F (19 °C)
- Game attendance: 52,236
- Referee: Michael VanderVelde
- TV announcers (FOX): Gus Johnson (play-by-play), Joel Klatt (analyst), and Jenny Taft (sideline)

Game information

First quarter

- TTU – Cameron Dickey 1-yard run (Stone Harrington kick), 10:13. Red Raiders 7–0. Drive: 7 plays, 85 yards, 3:01.

Second quarter

- TTU – Stone Harrington 58-yard field goal, 0:48. Red Raiders 10–0. 'Drive: 8 plays, 13 yards, 1:23.
- UTAH – Dillon Curtis 32-yard field goal, 0:00. Red Raiders 10–3. Drive: 9 plays, 61 yards, 0:48.

Third quarter

No scoring plays

Fourth quarter

- TTU – Stone Harrington 25-yard field goal, 12:33. Red Raiders 13–3. Drive: 12 plays, 79 yards, 4:30.
- UTAH – Wayshawn Parker 5-yard run (Dillon Curtis kick), 10:22. Red Raiders 13–10. Drive: 8 plays, 75 yards, 2:11.
- TTU – Terrance Carter Jr. 24-yard pass from Will Hammond (Stone Harrington kick), 8:29. Red Raiders 20–10. Drive: 4 plays, 75 yards, 1:53.
- TTU – Cameron Dickey 24-yard run (Stone Harrington kick), 3:41. Red Raiders 27–10. Drive: 7 plays, 68 yards, 3:47.
- TTU – Reggie Virgil 21-yard pass from Will Hammond (Stone Harrington kick), 1:53. Red Raiders 34–10. Drive: 3 plays, 28 yards, 0:40.

Statistics	TTU	UTAH
First downs	20	16
Plays–yards	72–484	69–263
Rushes–yards	37–173	31–101
Passing yards	311	162
Passing: comp–att–int	25–35–2	25–38–2
Turnovers	2	4
Time of possession	32:15	27:45

Team	Category	Player	Statistics
Texas Tech	Passing	Will Hammond	13/16, 169 yards, 2 TD
Texas Tech	Rushing	Cameron Dickey	13 carries, 67 yards, 2 TD
Texas Tech	Receiving	Reggie Virgil	6 receptions, 72 yards, TD
Utah	Passing	Devon Dampier	25/38, 162 yards, 2 INT
Utah	Rushing	NaQuari Rogers	10 carries, 37 yards
Utah	Receiving	Dallen Bentley	6 receptions, 75 yards

=== at West Virginia ===
Utah Utes (3–1) at West Virginia Mountaineers (2–2) – Game summary

Quarter	1	2	3	4	Total
Utes	14	14	10	10	48
Mountaineers	0	0	7	7	14

at Milan Puskar Stadium • Morgantown, West Virginia

- Date: September 27
- Game time: 1:30 p.m.
- Game weather: Rain • Temperature: 69 °F (21 °C) • Wind: SE @ 4 mph
- Game attendance: 53,965
- Referee: Stephen Baron
- TV announcers (FOX): Jason Benetti (play-by-play), Robert Griffin III (analyst), and Alexa Landestoy (sideline)

Game information

First quarter

- (7:16) UTAH – JJ Buchanan 7-yard pass from Devon Dampier, Dillon Curtis kick (Drive: 12 plays, 73 yards, 4:40; Utah 7–0)
- (1:33) UTAH – Devon Dampier 7-yard run, Dillon Curtis kick (Drive: 11 plays, 65 yards, 4:43; Utah 14–0)

Second quarter

- (11:32) UTAH – Ryan Davis 32-yard pass from Devon Dampier, Dillon Curtis kick (Drive: 6 plays, 58 yards, 2:43; Utah 21–0)
- (0:13) UTAH – Dallen Bentley 2-yard pass from Devon Dampier, Dillon Curtis kick (Drive: 15 plays, 94 yards, 4:43; Utah 28–0)

Third quarter

- (10:42) UTAH – Wayshawn Parker 11-yard pass from Devon Dampier, Dillon Curtis kick (Drive: 10 plays, 63 yards, 4:15; Utah 35–0)
- (7:28) WVU – Cam Vaughn 39-yard pass from Khalil Wilkins, Kade Hensley kick (Drive: 8 plays, 75 yards, 3:14; Utah 35–7)
- (5:18) UTAH – Dillon Curtis 33-yard field goal (Drive: 5 plays, 60 yards, 2:10; Utah 38–7)

Fourth quarter

- (10:46) UTAH – Dillon Curtis 33-yard field goal (Drive: 9 plays, 61 yards, 5:28; Utah 41–7)
- (7:59) WVU – Diore Hubbard 1-yard run, Kade Hensley kick (Drive: 5 plays, 75 yards, 2:47; Utah 41–14)
- (1:56) UTAH – Bryce Duke 2-yard pass from Byrd Ficklin, Dillon Curtis kick (Drive: 10 plays, 75 yards, 6:03; Utah 48–14)

Statistics	UTAH	WVU
First downs	33	14
Plays–yards	79-532	61-346
Rushes–yards	47-242	48-261
Passing yards	290	85
Passing: comp–att–int	25-30-1	6-13-0
Turnovers	1	0
Time of possession	34:45	25:15

Team	Category	Player	Statistics
Utah	Passing	Devon Dampier	21/26, 237 yards, 4 TD, INT
Utah	Rushing	Wayshawn Parker	9 carries, 66 yards
Utah	Receiving	Ryan Davis	7 receptions, 107 yards, TD
West Virginia	Passing	Khalil Wilkins	3/6, 63 yards, TD
West Virginia	Rushing	Jarod Bowie	1 carry, 68 yards
West Virginia	Receiving	Cam Vaughn	3 receptions, 62 yards, TD

=== vs No. 21 Arizona State ===
No. 21 Arizona State Sun Devils (4–1) at Utah Utes (4–1) – Game summary

Quarter	1	2	3	4	Total
No. 21 Sun Devils	3	0	7	0	10
Utes	7	14	14	7	42

at Rice–Eccles Stadium • Salt Lake City, Utah

- Date: October 11
- Game time: 7:25 p.m. MDT
- Game weather: Rain • Temperature: 40 °F (4 °C) • Wind: N 9 mph
- Game attendance: 51,444
- Referee: Kevin Mar
- TV announcers (ESPN): Dave Flemming (play-by-play), Brock Osweiler (analyst), and Stormy Buonantony (sideline)

Game information

First quarter

- UTAH – Devon Dampier 12-yard run (Dillon Curtis kick), 9:56. Utes 7–0. Drive: 15 plays, 75 yards, 5:04.
- ASU – Jesus Gomez 38-yard field goal, 2:34. Utes 7–3. Drive: 18 plays, 54 yards, 7:22.

Second quarter

- UTAH – Devon Dampier 24-yard run (Dillon Curtis kick), 11:27. Utes 14–3. Drive: 8 plays, 59 yards, 3:05.
- UTAH – NaQuari Rogers 22-yard run (Dillon Curtis kick), 1:04. Utes 21–3. Drive: 6 plays, 75 yards, 2:01.

Third quarter

- UTAH – NaQuari Rogers 2-yard run (Dillon Curtis kick), 11:00. Utes 28–3. Drive: 6 plays, 68 yards, 2:36.
- ASU – Jordyn Tyson 3-yard run (Jesus Gomez kick), 4:32. Utes 28–10. Drive: 13 plays, 75 yards, 6:28.
- UTAH – Devon Dampier 9-yard run (Dillon Curtis kick), 0:45. Utes 35–10. Drive: 8 plays, 64 yards, 3:42.

Fourth quarter

- UTAH – Byrd Ficklin 4-yard run (Dillon Curtis kick), 10:05. Utes 42–10. Drive: 4 plays, 42 yards, 1:44.

Statistics	ASU	UTAH
First downs	23	23
Plays–yards	78–259	55–412
Rushes–yards	40–135	42–276
Passing yards	124	136
Passing: comp–att–int	18–38–0	8–13–0
Turnovers	0	0
Time of possession	36:26	23:34

Team	Category	Player	Statistics
Arizona State	Passing	Jeff Sims	18/38, 124 yards
Arizona State	Rushing	Raleek Brown	14 carries, 67 yards
Arizona State	Receiving	Jordyn Tyson	8 receptions, 40 yards
Utah	Passing	Devon Dampier	7/12, 104 yards
Utah	Rushing	Devon Dampier	10 carries, 120 yards, 3 TD
Utah	Receiving	Ryan Davis	3 receptions, 68 yards

=== at No. 15 BYU (Holy War) ===
No. 23 Utah Utes (5–1) at No. 15 BYU Cougars (6–0) – Game summary

Quarter	1	2	3	4	Total
No. 23 Utes	0	7	0	14	21
No. 15 Cougars	0	10	0	14	24

at LaVell Edwards Stadium • Provo, Utah

- Date: October 18
- Game time: 6:00 p.m.
- Game weather: Sunny • Temperature: 63 °F (17 °C) • Wind: NE @ 3 mph
- Game attendance: 64,794
- Referee: Henry Johns
- TV announcers (FOX): Jason Benetti (play-by-play), Robert Griffin III (analyst), and Alexa Landestoy (sideline)

Game information

First quarter

- No scoring plays.

Second quarter

- (13:37) BYU – Chase Roberts 17-yard pass from Bear Bachmeier, Will Ferrin kick (Drive: 6 plays, 81 yards, 3:00; BYU 7–0)
- (3:24) UTAH – Ryan Davis 11-yard pass from Devon Dampier, Dillon Curtis kick (Drive: 9 plays, 85 yards, 3:54; Tied 7–7)
- (0:03) BYU – Will Ferrin 26-yard field goal (Drive: 10 plays, 33 yards, 2:18; BYU 10–7)

Third quarter

- No scoring plays.

Fourth quarter

- (14:15) UTAH – Daniel Bray 49-yard run, Dillon Curtis kick (Drive: 9 plays, 90 yards, 4:12; Utah 14–10)
- (11:19) BYU – Parker Kingston 12-yard run, Will Ferrin kick (Drive: 5 plays, 81 yards, 2:46; BYU 17–14)
- (4:22) BYU – Bear Bachmeier 22-yard run, Will Ferrin kick (Drive: 8 plays, 64 yards, 5:02; BYU 24–14)
- (1:24) UTAH – Larry Simmons 2-yard pass from Devon Dampier, Dillon Curtis kick (Drive: 5 plays, 77 yards, 1:21; BYU 24–21)

Statistics	UTAH	BYU
First downs	25	23
Plays–yards	73–470	66–368
Rushes–yards	37–226	42–202
Passing yards	244	166
Passing: comp–att–int	20–36–1	13–24–0
Turnovers	2	0
Time of possession	28:53	31:07

Team	Category	Player	Statistics
Utah	Passing	Devon Dampier	20/36, 244 yards, 2 TD, INT
Utah	Rushing	Daniel Bray	10 carries, 121 yards, TD
Utah	Receiving	Ryan Davis	7 receptions, 66 yards, TD
BYU	Passing	Bear Bachmeier	13/22, 166 yards, TD
BYU	Rushing	LJ Martin	26 carries, 122 yards
BYU	Receiving	Parker Kingston	4 receptions, 50 yards

=== vs Colorado (Rumble in the Rockies) ===
Colorado Buffaloes (3–4) at Utah Utes (5–2) – Game summary

Quarter	1	2	3	4	Total
Buffaloes	0	0	0	7	7
Utes	17	26	3	7	53

at Rice–Eccles Stadium • Salt Lake City, Utah

- Date: October 25
- Game time: 8:15 p.m.
- Game weather: Cloudy • Temperature: 67 °F (19 °C) • Wind: S @ 18 mph
- Game attendance: 51,949
- Referee: Cravonne Barrett
- TV announcers (ESPN): Roy Philpott (play-by-play), Brock Osweiler (analyst), and Stormy Buonantony (sideline)

Game information

First quarter

- (14:23) UTAH – Byrd Ficklin 63-yard run, Dillon Curtis kick (Drive: 2 plays, 75 yards, 0:37; Utah 7–0)
- (4:51) UTAH – Dillon Curtis 53-yard field goal (Drive: 11 plays, 40 yards, 4:30; Utah 10–0)
- (2:53) UTAH – Wayshawn Parker 58-yard run, Dillon Curtis kick (Drive: 1 play, 58 yards, 0:13; Utah 17–0)

Second quarter

- (14:30) UTAH – Team safety (Drive: 3 plays, -10 yards, 0:22; Utah 19–0)
- (12:50) UTAH – JJ Buchanan 22-yard pass from Byrd Ficklin, Dillon Curtis kick (Drive: 4 plays, 72 yards, 1:39; Utah 26–0)
- (3:42) UTAH – NaQuari Rogers 2-yard run, Dillon Curtis kick (Drive: 16 plays, 60 yards, 7:21; Utah 33–0)
- (2:08) UTAH – Larry Simmons 20-yard pass from Byrd Ficklin, Dillon Curtis kick (Drive: 2 plays, 21 yards, 0:34; Utah 40–0)
- (0:00) UTAH – Dillon Curtis 23-yard field goal (Drive: 4 plays, 2 yards, 0:41; Utah 43–0)

Third quarter

- (1:42) UTAH – Dillon Curtis 45-yard field goal (Drive: 8 plays, 27 yards, 3:48; Utah 46–0)

Fourth quarter

- (9:03) COL – Ryan Staub 1-yard run, Alejandro Mata kick (Drive: 9 plays, 59 yards, 3:52; Utah 46–7)
- (3:12) UTAH – Nate Johnson 56-yard run, Dillon Curtis kick (Drive: 2 plays, 70 yards, 0:53; Utah 53–7)

Statistics	COLO	UTAH
First downs	25	12
Plays–yards	76–587	68–140
Rushes–yards	51–422	38–38
Passing yards	165	102
Passing: Comp–Att–Int	11–25–0	13–30–1
Turnovers	0	1
Time of possession	33:38	26:22

Team	Category	Player	Statistics
Colorado	Passing	Ryan Staub	4/8, 65 yards
Colorado	Rushing	Kam Mikell	8 carries, 44 yards
Colorado	Receiving	Omarion Miller	3 receptions, 59 yards
Utah	Passing	Byrd Ficklin	10/22, 140 yards, 2 TD
Utah	Rushing	Byrd Ficklin	20 carries, 151 yards, TD
Utah	Receiving	Larry Simmons	2 receptions, 39 yards, TD

=== vs No. 17 Cincinnati ===
No. 17 Cincinnati Bearcats (7–1) at No. 24 Utah Utes (6–2) – Game summary

Quarter	1	2	3	4	Total
No. 17 Bearcats	7	0	7	0	14
No. 24 Utes	14	10	14	7	45

at Rice–Eccles Stadium • Salt Lake City, Utah

- Date: November 1
- Game time: 8:15 p.m.
- Game weather: Clear • Temperature: 58 °F (14 °C) • Wind: NE @ 5 mph
- Game attendance: 51,672
- Referee: Luke Richmond
- TV announcers (ESPN): Dave Pasch (play-by-play), Dusty Dvoracek (analyst), and Taylor McGregor (sideline)

Game information

First quarter

- UTAH – Ryan Davis 34-yard pass from Devon Dampier (Dillon Curtis kick), 7:05. Utes 7–0. Drive: 16 plays, 94 yards, 7:07.
- CIN – Brendan Sorsby 22-yard run (Stephen Rusnak kick), 3:53. Tied 7–7. Drive: 8 plays, 75 yards, 3:12.
- UTAH – Wayshawn Parker 39-yard run (Dillon Curtis kick), 1:01. Utes 14–7. Drive: 7 plays, 75 yards, 2:52.

Second quarter

- UTAH – Dillon Curtis 33-yard field goal, 4:23. Utes 17–7. Drive: 13 plays, 66 yards, 5:53.
- UTAH – NaQuari Rogers 1-yard run (Dillon Curtis kick), 1:19. Utes 24–7. Drive: 6 plays, 70 yards, 2:25.

Third quarter

- CIN – Cyrus Allen 88-yard pass from Brendan Sorsby (Stephen Rusnak kick), 10:35. Utes 24–14. Drive: 2 plays, 88 yards, 0:20.
- UTAH – Creed Whittemore 11-yard pass from Devon Dampier (Dillon Curtis kick), 2:26. Utes 31–14. Drive: 8 plays, 52 yards, 3:29.
- UTAH – Mana Carvalho 75-yard punt return (Dillon Curtis kick), 1:36. Utes 38–14.

Fourth quarter

- UTAH – Byrd Ficklin 2-yard run (Dillon Curtis kick), 3:25. Utes 45–14. Drive: 4 plays, 26 yards, 2:21.

Statistics	CIN	UTAH
First downs	18	29
Plays–yards	63–427	84–480
Rushes–yards	30–206	53–267
Passing yards	221	213
Passing: comp–att–int	11–33–1	16–31–1
Turnovers	3	2
Time of possession	19:58	40:02

Team	Category	Player	Statistics
Cincinnati	Passing	Brendan Sorsby	11/33, 221 yards, TD, INT
Cincinnati	Rushing	Tawee Walker	7 carries, 67 yards
Cincinnati	Receiving	Cyrus Allen	2 receptions, 133 yards, TD
Utah	Passing	Devon Dampier	16/31, 213 yards, 2 TD, INT
Utah	Rushing	Wayshawn Parker	17 carries, 104 yards, TD
Utah	Receiving	Ryan Davis	8 receptions, 132 yards, TD

=== at Baylor ===
No. 13 Utah Utes (7–2) at Baylor Bears (5–4) – Game summary

Quarter	1	2	3	4	Total
No. 13 Utes	14	14	7	20	55
Bears	0	17	3	8	28

at McLane Stadium • Waco, Texas

- Date: November 15
- Game time: 5:00 p.m.
- Game weather:
- Game attendance: 38,186
- Referee: Kevin Mar
- TV announcers (ESPN2): Lowell Galindo (play-by-play), Aaron Murray (analyst), and Lauren Sisler (sideline)

Game information

First quarter

- UTAH – Dallen Bentley 25-yard pass from Devon Dampier (Dillon Curtis kick), 2:31. Utes 7–0. Drive: 10 plays, 76 yards, 4:50.
- UTAH – Elijah Davis 65-yard interception return (Dillon Curtis kick), 0:11. Utes 14–0.

Second quarter

- BAY – Josh Cameron 1-yard pass from Sawyer Robertson (Connor Hawkins kick), 12:00. Utes 14–7. Drive: 8 plays, 75 yards, 3:11.
- UTAH – Byrd Ficklin 67-yard run (Dillon Curtis kick), 10:47. Utes 21–7. Drive: 3 plays, 75 yards, 1:13.
- BAY – Connor Hawkins 23-yard field goal, 5:01. Utes 21–10. Drive: 8 plays, 73 yards, 3:16.
- UTAH – Wayshawn Parker 64-yard run (Dillon Curtis kick), 4:28. Utes 28–10. Drive: 2 plays, 75 yards, 0:33.
- BAY – Josh Cameron 29-yard pass from Sawyer Robertson (Connor Hawkins kick), 0:04. Utes 28–17. Drive: 2 plays, 55 yards, 0:18.

Third quarter

- BAY – Connor Hawkins 31-yard field goal, 8:09. Utes 28–20. Drive: 10 plays, 63 yards, 3:37.
- UTAH – Byrd Ficklin 74-yard run (Dillon Curtis kick), 7:14. Utes 35–20. Drive: 2 plays, 85 yards, 0:49.

Fourth quarter

- UTAH – NaQuari Rogers 3-yard run (Dillon Curtis kick), 14:12. Utes 42–20. Drive: 8 plays, 54 yards, 4:20.
- UTAH – Wayshawn Parker 5-yard pass from Devon Dampier (Dillon Curtis kick), 11:03. Utes 49–20. Drive: 3 plays, 9 yards, 1:40.
- BAY – Kole Wilson 18-yard pass from Sawyer Robertson (Sawyer Robertson–Josh Cameron pass), 8:18. Utes 49–28. Drive: 6 plays, 75 yards, 2:45.
- UTAH – NaQuari Rogers 1-yard run (Dillon Curtis kick BLOCKED), 3:28. Utes 55–28. Drive: 10 plays, 90 yards, 4:50.

Statistics	UTAH	BAY
First downs	20	28
Plays–yards	59–483	92–563
Rushes–yards	41–380	33–133
Passing yards	103	430
Passing: comp–att–int	8–16–0	29–58–2
Turnovers	0	2
Time of possession	28:03	32:57

Team	Category	Player	Statistics
Utah	Passing	Devon Dampier	6/13, 80 yards, 2 TD
Utah	Rushing	Byrd Ficklin	6 carries, 166 yards, 2 TD
Utah	Receiving	Dallen Bentley	3 receptions, 48 yards, TD
Baylor	Passing	Sawyer Robertson	29/59, 430 yards, 3 TD, 2 INT
Baylor	Rushing	Bryson Washington	14 carries, 97 yards
Baylor	Receiving	Josh Cameron	13 receptions, 165 yards, 2 TD

=== vs Kansas State ===
Kansas State Wildcats (5–5) at No. 12 Utah Utes (8–2) – Game summary

Quarter	1	2	3	4	Total
Wildcats	7	24	7	9	47
No. 12 Utes	7	14	14	16	51

at Rice–Eccles Stadium • Salt Lake City, Utah

- Date: November 22
- Game time: 2:00 p.m.
- Game weather: 47, Sunny, Wind NW 5 mph
- Game attendance: 51,444
- Referee: Stephen Baron
- TV announcers (ESPN2): Dave Flemming (play-by-play), Brock Osweiler (analyst), and Stormy Buonantony (sideline)

Game information

First quarter

- KSU – Antonio Martin Jr. 37-yard run (Luis Rodriguez kick), 8:29. Wildcats 7–0. Drive: 6 plays, 85 yards, 3:18
- UTAH – Byrd Ficklin 10-yard run (Dillon Curtis kick), 4:48. Tied 7–7. Drive: 9 plays, 70 yards, 3:32

Second quarter

- KSU – Avery Johnson 4-yard run (Luis Rodriguez kick), 14:54. Wildcats 14–7. Drive: 8 plays, 75 yards, 4:54
- UTAH – Byrd Ficklin 6-yard run (Dillon Curtis kick), 11:11. Tied 14–14. Drive: 11 plays, 75 yards, 3:43
- KSU – Joe Jackson 66-yard run (Luis Rodriguez kick), 9:07. Wildcats 21–14. Drive: 4 plays, 75 yards, 2:04
- UTAH – Devon Dampier 8-yard run (Dillon Curtis kick), 6:51. Tied 21–21. Drive: 6 plays, 75 yards, 2:16
- KSU – Luis Rodriguez 22-yard field goal, 4:32. Wildcats 24–21. Drive: 7 plays, 70 yards, 2:19
- KSU – Joe Jackson 80-yard (Luis Rodriguez kick), 1:17. Wildcats 31–21. Drive: 1 play, 80 yards, 0:14

Third quarter

- UTAH – Dallen Bentley 38-yard pass from Devon Dampier (Dillon Curtis kick), 13:49. Wildcats 31–28. Drive: 4 plays, 75 yards, 1:11
- UTAH – Byrd Ficklin 10-yard run (Dillon Curtis kick), 10:03, Utes 35–31. Drive: 7 plays, 66 yards, 2:47
- KSU – Garrett Oakley 2-yard pass from Avery Johnson (Luis Rodriguez kick), 1:44. Wildcats 38–35. Drive: 14 plays, 79 yards, 8:15

Fourth quarter

- KSU – Luis Rodriguez 36-yard field goal, 8:51. Wildcats 41–35. Drive: 13 plays, 59 yards, 6:15
- KSU – Joe Jackson 24-yard run (pass failed), 7:00. Wildcats 47–35. Drive: 3 plays, 26 yards, 0:41
- UTAH – Tao Johnson defensive PAT conversion from 99-yard interception return, 7:00. Wildcats 47–37. Drive: 3 plays, 26 yards, 0:41
- UTAH – Larry Simmons 20-yard pass from Devon Dampier (Dillon Curtis kick), 2:47. Wildcats 47–44. Drive: 12 plays, 75 yards, 4:13
- UTAH – Devon Dampier 1-yard run (Dillon Curtis Kick), 0:56. Utes 51–47. Drive: 7 plays, 70 yards, 1:29

Statistics	KSU	UTAH
First downs	21	32
Plays–yards	65-574	84-551
Rushes–yards	42-472	50-292
Passing yards	102	259
Passing: comp–att–int	12-23-1	18-34-0
Turnovers	1	1
Time of possession	30:56	29:04

Team	Category	Player	Statistics
Kansas State	Passing	Avery Johnson	12/23, 102 yards, TD, INT
Kansas State	Rushing	Joe Jackson	24 carries, 293 yards, 3 TD
Kansas State	Receiving	Jaron Tibbs	6 receptions, 45 yards
Utah	Passing	Devon Dampier	18/33, 259 yards, 2 TD
Utah	Rushing	Devon Dampier	14 carries, 94 yards, 2 TD
Utah	Receiving	JJ Buchanan	2 receptions, 74 yards

=== at Kansas ===
No. 13 Utah Utes (9–2) at Kansas Jayhawks (5–6) – Game summary

Quarter	1	2	3	4	Total
No. 13 Utes	3	7	0	21	31
Jayhawks	0	7	7	7	21

at David Booth Kansas Memorial Stadium • Lawrence, Kansas

- Date: November 28
- Game time: 10:00 a.m.
- Game weather: Sunny • Temperature: 33 °F (1 °C) • Wind: SE @ 10 mph
- Game attendance: 32,811
- Referee: Mike McCabe
- TV announcers (ESPN): Anish Shroff (play-by-play), Andre Ware (analyst) and Paul Carcaterra (sideline)

Game information

First quarter

- UTAH – Dillon Curtis 34-yard field goal, 8:39. Utes 3–0. Drive: 6 plays, 49 yards, 2:41.

Second quarter

- KU – Daniel Hishaw Jr. 7-yard run (Laith Marjan kick), 12:03. Jayhawks 7–3. Drive: 8 plays, 73 yards, 3:57.
- UTAH – JJ Buchanan 58-yard pass from Devon Dampier (Dillon Curtis kick), 9:24. Utes 10–7. Drive: 6 plays, 75 yards, 2:39.

Third quarter

- KU – Jalon Daniels 1-yard run (Laith Marjan kick), 8:15. Jayhawks 14–10. Drive: 8 plays, 67 yards, 3:54.

Fourth quarter

- UTAH – Larry Simmons 28-yard pass from Devon Dampier (Dillon Curtis kick), 12:26. Utes 17–14. Drive: 4 plays, 80 yards, 1:13.
- UTAH – Elijah Davis 97-yard interception return (Dillon Curtis kick), 7:52. Utes 24–14.
- KU – Leyton Cure 21-yard pass from Jalon Daniels (Laith Marjan kick), 5:32. Utes 24–21. Drive: 8 plays, 93 yards, 2:14.
- UTAH – Larry Simmons 48-yard pass from Devon Dampier (Dillon Curtis kick), 2:14. Utes 31–21. Drive: 8 plays, 85 yards, 3:14.

Statistics	UTAH	KU
First downs	18	26
Plays–yards	56–414	78–477
Rushes–yards	31–161	51–290
Passing yards	253	187
Passing: comp–att–int	15–25–0	10–27–3
Turnovers	0	3
Time of possession	23:03	36:57

Team	Category	Player	Statistics
Utah	Passing	Devon Dampier	15/25, 253 yards, 3 TD
Utah	Rushing	Wayshawn Parker	12 carries, 95 yards
Utah	Receiving	Larry Simmons	3 receptions, 97 yards, 2 TD
Kansas	Passing	Jalon Daniels	10/27, 187 yards, TD, 3 INT
Kansas	Rushing	Daniel Hishaw Jr.	22 carries, 107 yards, TD
Kansas	Receiving	Emmanuel Henderson Jr.	3 receptions, 113 yards

=== vs. Nebraska (Las Vegas Bowl) ===
2025 SRS Distribution Las Vegas Bowl
Nebraska Cornhuskers (7–5) vs. No. 15 Utah Utes (10–2) – Game summary

Quarter	1	2	3	4	Total
Cornhuskers	14	0	0	8	22
No. 15 Utes	7	17	14	6	44

at Allegiant Stadium • Las Vegas, NV

- Date: December 31
- Game time: 1:30 p.m. MST
- Game weather: Sunny • Temperature: 52 °F (11 °C)
- Game attendance: 38,879
- Referee: Jason Autrey
- TV announcers (ESPN): Dave Flemming (play-by-play), Brock Osweiler (analyst) and Dawn Davenport (sideline)

Game information

First Quarter

- (11:08) NEB – Mekhi Nelson 38-yard run, Kyle Cunanan kick (Drive: 8 plays, 82 yards, 3:47, Nebraska 7–0)
- (8:33) UTAH – Devon Dampier 2-yard run, Dillon Curtis kick (Drive: 6 plays, 75 yards, 2:35, 7-7)
- (2:20) NEB – Jacory Barney Jr. 8-yard pass from TJ Lateef, Kyle Cunanan kick (Drive: 12 plays, 75 yards, 6:13, Nebraska 14-7)

Second Quarter

- (10:05) UTAH – JJ Buchanan 20-yard pass from Devon Dampier, Dillon Curtis kick (Drive: 9 plays, 74 yards, 3:23, 14-14)
- (4:13) UTAH – Dillon Curtis 28-yard field goal (Drive: 10 plays, 50 yards, 4:07, Utah 17-14)
- (0:20) UTAH – Devon Dampier 11-yard run, Dillon Curtis kick (Drive: 10 plays, 74 yards, 1:52, 24-14)

Third Quarter

- (10:40) UTAH – NaQuari Rogers 3-yard run, Dillon Curtis kick (Drive: 10 plays, 75 yards, 4:20, 31-14)
- (5:56) UTAH – Devon Dampier 5-yard run, Dillon Curtis kick (Drive: 9 plays, 51 yards, 3:03, 38-14)

Fourth Quarter

- (8:16) UTAH – Dallen Bentley 17-yard pass from Devon Dampier, Dillon Curtis kick missed (Drive: 8 plays, 95 yards, 2:36, 44-14)
- (1:55) NEB – TJ Lateef 7-yard run, Quinn Clark pass from TJ Lateef for 2-pt (Drive: 13 plays, 75 yards, 6:21, 44-22)

Statistics	NEB	UTAH
First downs	17	26
Plays–yards	65–343	76–535
Rushes–yards	37–161	45–225
Passing yards	182	310
Passing: Comp–Att–Int	15–28–1	19–31–0
Turnovers	1	0
Time of possession	31:39	28:21

Team	Category	Player	Statistics
Nebraska	Passing	TJ Lateef	15/28, 182 yards, TD, INT
Nebraska	Rushing	Mekhi Nelson	12 carries, 88 yards, TD
Nebraska	Receiving	Isaiah Mozee	4 receptions, 48 yards
Utah	Passing	Devon Dampier	19/31, 310 yards, 2 TD
Utah	Rushing	Devon Dampier	19 carries, 148 yards, 3 TD
Utah	Receiving	Dallen Bentley	6 receptions, 106 yards, TD

== Roster ==
2025 Utah Utes football team roster
Players
Coaches
Offense

Pos.	#	Name	Class
RB	0	Raycine Guillory	Fr
RB	1	Wayshawn Parker	So
WR	2	Creed Whittemore	So
WR	3	Nate Johnson	Jr
QB	4	Devon Dampier	Jr
TE	5	Otto Tia	Sr
WR	6	Daidren Zipperer	So
WR	7	Justin Stevenson	So
WR	8	Mana Carvalho	Fr
WR	9	Ryan Davis	Sr
TE	10	Hunter Andrews	Fr
QB	11	Isaac Wilson	So
WR	12	Larry Simmons	Jr
RB	13	Daniel Bray	Fr
QB	14	Brendan Zurbrugg	Fr
QB	15	Byrd Ficklin	Fr
QB	16	Drew Cowart	Fr
WR	17	Rayshawn Glover	Jr
WR	18	Tobias Merriweather	Jr
WR	19	Luca Caldarella	Sr
RB	21	NaQuari Rogers	Sr
RB	23	Devin Green	So
WR	24	Diezel Kamoku	Fr
RB	25	Bryce Duke	Sr
WR	30	Matt Clark	So
RB	32	Omar Shah	So
RB	35	Frankie Goodson	Jr
WR	37	Peyton Rice	So
WR	38	Junior Coughlin	Fr
WR	39	Bryan Spotwood	So
OL	51	Kamilo Raass	Fr
OL	52	Michael Mokofisi	Sr
OL	54	Milz Asiata	Fr
OL	55	Spencer Fano	Jr
OL	58	Kalolo Ta'aga	Fr
OL	62	Solatao Moeai	Jr
OL	64	Reece Parmenter	So
OL	67	Soren Shinofield	Fr
OL	68	Jaren Kump	Sr
OL	71	Caleb Lomu	So
OL	72	Isaiah Garcia	Fr
OL	73	Tanoa Togiai	Sr
OL	74	Keith Olson	Jr
OL	75	Roger Alderman	So
OL	76	Zereoue Williams	Sr
OL	77	Nick Hallock	Fr
OL	79	Alex Harrison	Sr
WR	80	Bryson Baker	Fr
TE	81	JJ Buchanan	Fr
WR	83	Daylin Caamano	Fr
TE	84	Drew Clemens	Fr
TE	85	Broderick Redden	Fr
WR	86	Jackson Bolender	Fr
TE	88	Dallen Bentley	Sr

Defense

Pos.	#	Name	Class
DE	0	Logan Fano	Jr
S	1	Rabbit Evans	Sr
CB	2	Smith Snowden	Jr
LB	3	Levani Damuni	GS
CB	4	Don Saunders	Jr
S	5	Tao Johnson	Jr
S	6	Nate Ritchie	Jr
LB	7	Johnathan Hall	Jr
LB	8	Lander Barton	Sr
CB	9	Elijah Davis	Jr
CB	10	Blake Cotton	Sr
CB	11	Rock Caldwell	Jr
CB	12	Jaylen Moson	Fr
CB	13	Jason Stokes Jr.	Fr
CB	14	JC Hart	So
DE	15	Lance Holtzclaw	Jr
CB	16	Cole Standage	Fr
LB	20	Mateaki Helu	Fr
S	21	Nate Tilmon	Fr
S	23	Jackson Bennee	So
LB	24	Moroni Anae	Sr
S	25	Manny Fuller	Fr
CB	26	Isaiah Brown	So
S	27	Tommy Nelson	Fr
LB	28	Anthony Hernandez	Fr
CB	29	LaTristan Thompson	Fr
S	31	Jack Evans	Fr
S	32	Josh Sovereign	Fr
LB	33	Kana'i Lopes	Fr
S	34	Ashton Olevao	Fr
LB	35	Cyrus Polu	Fr
S	36	Brock Fonoimoana	Fr
LB	37	Trey Reynolds	Jr
DE	40	Paul Fitzgerald	Jr
DE	41	Ryker Kemp	Fr
LB	42	Christian Thatcher	Fr
LB	43	Grady Mareko	So
DT	44	Sione Motuapuaka	Fr
DT	45	Pupu Sepulona	Fr
DE	48	Alex Cloward	So
DT	49	Mike Tauteoli	So
DT	51	Karson Kaufusi	Fr
DT	78	Taniela Pepa	Fr
LB	83	Elijah Elliss	Fr
DE	90	John Henry Daley	So
DT	91	Jonah Lea'ea	So
DE	92	John Frank Jr.	So
DE	93	Kash Dillon	Fr
DE	94	Jaxson Jones	Fr
DT	95	Aliki Vimahi	GS
DT	96	Dilan Battle	Fr
DT	98	Dallas Vakalahi	So
DT	99	Semi Taulanga	Fr

Special teams

Pos.	#	Name	Class
K	17	Dillon Curtis	Fr
SN	44	Logan Castor	Jr
K	46	Robert Petrich	So
LS	47	Charlie King	Fr
P	92	Orion Phillips	So
K	97	Joey Cheek	So

Head coach

- Kyle Whittingham

Coordinators/assistant coaches

- Morgan Scalley – Defensive coordinator/safeties
- Jason Beck – Offensive coordinator
- Jim Harding – Assistant head coach/offensive line
- Sharrieff Shah – Special teams coordinator/cornerbacks
- Freddie Whittingham – Recruiting coordinator/tight ends
- Lewis Powell – Defensive ends
- Mark Atuaia – Running backs
- Luther Elliss – Defensive tackles
- Colton Swan – Linebackers
- Micah Simon – Wide receivers
- Luke Bottari – Offensive graduate assistant
- Kammy Delp – Offensive graduate assistant
- Jordan Fogal – Defensive graduate assistant
- Brandon McKinney – Defensive graduate assistant
- Ryan Blakney – Offensive analyst
- Koy Detmer Jr. – Offensive analyst/quarterbacks
- Isaac Asiata – Offensive analyst/offensive line
- Vince Conti – Defensive analyst
- Jake Cookus – Senior special teams analyst/kickers & punters
- Dom Conti – Special teams analyst
- Adam Fry – Director, football operations
- Robert Blechen – General manager, personnel
- Sam Morrissette – Director, personnel coordinator
- Doug Elisaia – Director, strength and conditioning
- Quincy Watkins – Defensive quality control
- Jeff Rudy – Associate director for administration

Legend

- (C) Team captain
- (S) Suspended
- (I) Ineligible
- Injured
- Redshirt

Roster
Last update: 7/3/25

== Awards and honors ==
=== In-season awards ===
==== Weekly Individual Awards ====
Big 12 Football Player of the Week
Date	Player/Unit	Position	Award	Notes
Week 2	Devon Dampier	QB	Offensive	
Week 2	Offensive Line		Offensive Line	
Week 2	Defensive Line		Defensive Line	
Week 8	Offensive Line		Offensive Line	
Week 10	Byrd Ficklin	QB	Offensive	
Week 10	Byrd Ficklin	QB	Freshman	
Week 10	Offensive Line		Offensive Line	
Week 11	Mano Carvalho	Returner	Special Teams	
Week 11	Defensive Line		Defensive Line	
Week 13	Byrd Ficklin	QB	Freshman	
Week 13	Offensive Line		Offensive Line	

==== All-Big 12 ====
Spencer Fano was awarded the Big 12 Offensive Lineman of the Year by the league's head coaches. Devon Dampier was awarded Offensive Newcomer of the Year and received honorable mention for Offensive Player of the Year. John Henry Daley received honorable mention for Defensive Player of the Year and Defensive Lineman of the Year. Byrd Ficklin received honorable mention for Offensive Freshman of the Year.

All-Big 12
Player	Position	Coaches	Media
Spencer Fano	OL	1	1
Caleb Lomu	OL	1	1
John Henry Daley	DL	1	1
Logan Fano	DL	2	–
Smith Snowden	DB	2	–
Devon Dampier	QB	3	–
Wayshawn Parker	RB	3	–
Dallen Bentley	TE/FLEX	3	–
Jackson Bennee	DB	Hon.	–
Logan Castor	Specialist	Hon.	–
Mana Carvalho	Returner	Hon.	–
Ryan Davis	WR	Hon.	–
Jaren Kump	OL	Hon.	–
Michael Mokofisi	OL	Hon.	–
Tanoa Togiai	OL	Hon.	–
