= 2025 Cal Poly Mustangs football team =

American college football season

2025 Cal Poly Mustangs football
- Conference: Big Sky Conference
- Record: 4–8 (2–6 Big Sky)
- Head coach: Paul Wulff (3rd season)
- Offensive coordinator: Timm Rosenbach (2nd season)
- Offensive scheme: Spread triple option
- Defensive coordinator: Cody vonAppen (4th season)
- Base defense: 4–3
- Home stadium: Alex G. Spanos Stadium

2025 Big Sky Conference football standings
	Conf.			Overall
Team	W		L	W		L
No. 1 Montana State $^	8	–	0	14	–	2
No. 3 Montana ^	7	–	1	13	–	2
No. 8 UC Davis ^	6	–	2	9	–	4
Sacramento State	5	–	3	7	–	5
Idaho State	5	–	3	6	–	6
Northern Arizona	4	–	4	7	–	5
Eastern Washington	4	–	4	5	–	7
Cal Poly	2	–	6	4	–	8
Idaho	2	–	6	4	–	8
Northern Colorado	2	–	6	4	–	8
Weber State	2	–	6	4	–	8
Portland State	1	–	7	1	–	11
$ – Conference champion; ^ – FCS playoff participant; Rankings from STATS Poll

The 2025 Cal Poly Mustangs football team represented California Polytechnic State University, San Luis Obispo as a member of the Big Sky Conference during the 2025 NCAA Division I FCS football season. The Mustangs were led by Paul Wulff in his third and final season as head coach, and played at the Alex G. Spanos Stadium in San Luis Obispo, California.

== Schedule ==
Date	Time	Opponent	Site	TV	Result	Attendance
August 30	5:00 p.m.	at San Diego*	Torero Stadium; San Diego, CA	ESPN+	W 41–17	5,806
September 6	3:00 p.m.	at No. 25 (FBS) Utah*	Rice–Eccles Stadium; Salt Lake City, UT	ESPN+	L 9–63	51,463
September 13	5:00 p.m.	Western Oregon*	Alex G. Spanos Stadium; San Luis Obispo, CA	ESPN+	W 56–7	11,075
September 20	5:00 p.m.	at Stephen F. Austin*	Homer Bryce Stadium; Nacogdoches, TX	ESPN+	L 17–35	5,402
September 27	6:00 p.m.	at No. 21 Sacramento State	Hornet Stadium; Sacramento, CA	ESPN+	W 32–24	15,016
October 4	5:00 p.m.	No. 7 UC Davis^{†}	Alex G. Spanos Stadium; San Luis Obispo, CA (Battle for the Golden Horseshoe)	ESPN+	L 27–34	10,006
October 11	1:00 p.m.	at No. 4 Montana	Washington–Grizzly Stadium; Missoula, MT	ESPN+	L 9–28	26,347
October 25	5:00 p.m.	No. 5 Montana State	Alex G. Spanos Stadium; San Luis Obispo, CA	ESPN+	L 17–34	6,403
November 1	2:00 p.m.	Portland State	Alex G. Spanos Stadium; San Luis Obispo, CA	ESPN+	L 35–40	8,035
November 8	3:00 p.m.	at Idaho State	ICCU Dome; Pocatello, ID	ESPN+	L 17–27	5,646
November 15	1:00 p.m.	at No. 24 Northern Arizona	Walkup Skydome; Flagstaff, AZ	ESPN+	L 27–35	7,472
November 22	2:00 p.m.	Eastern Washington	Alex G. Spanos Stadium; San Luis Obispo, CA	ESPN+	W 43–34	6,732
*Non-conference game; ^{†}Homecoming; Rankings from STATS Poll released prior to the game; All times are in Pacific time

== Game summaries ==
=== at San Diego ===
Cal Poly Mustangs (0–0) at San Diego Toreros (0–0) – Game summary

Quarter	1	2	3	4	Total
Mustangs	14	10	3	14	41
Toreros	0	7	3	7	17

at Torero Stadium • San Diego, California

- Date: August 30
- Game time: 8:00 PM PDT
- Game weather: Sunny • Temperature: 81 °F (27 °C) • Wind: SE at 9 miles per hour (14 km/h)
- Game attendance: 5,806
- Referee: Jeff Rink
- TV announcers (ESPN+): Jack Cronin (play-by-play) and Braden Surprenant (analyst)

Game information

First quarter

- CP – Michael Briscoe 12-yard pass from Ty Dieffenbach (Gianluca Dimauro kick), 11:52. Mustangs 7–0. Drive: 9 plays, 75 yards, 3:08.
- CP – Michael Briscoe 14-yard pass from Ty Dieffenbach (Gianluca Dimauro kick), 5:58. Mustangs 14–0. Drive: 10 plays, 72 yards, 4:31.

Second quarter

- CP – Gianluca Dimauro 30-yard field goal, 14:15. Mustangs 17–0. Drive: 12 plays, 63 yards, 5:34.
- CP – Ty Dieffenbach 43-yard run (Noah Serna kick), 1:05. Mustangs 24–0. Drive: 4 plays, 91 yards, 1:16.
- USD – Bradley Schlom 45-yard pass from Dom Nankil (Emiliano Salazar kick), 0:00. Mustangs 24–7. 'Drive:

Third quarter

- USD – Emiliano Salazar 35-yard field goal, 10:21. Mustangs 24–10. Drive: 9 plays, 47 yards, 0:39.
- CP – Gianluca Dimauro 26-yard field goal, 6:49. Mustangs 27–10. Drive: 11 plays, 57 yards, 3:32.

Fourth quarter

- USD – Adam Carter 79-yard run (Emiliano Salazar kick), 14:49. Mustangs 27–17. Drive: 3 plays, 88 yards, 0:59.
- CP – Tyrei Washington 1-yard run (Noah Serna kick), 12:29. Mustangs 34–17. Drive: 7 plays, 63 yards, 2:14.
- CP – Alek Marshall 14-yard pass from Anthony Grigsby Jr. (Gianluca Dimauro kick), 1:56. Mustangs 41–17. Drive: 5 plays, 70 yards, 1:31.

Statistics	CP	USD
First downs	32	16
Plays–yards	71–469	63–367
Rushes–yards	38–134	33–165
Passing yards	335	202
Passing: Comp–Att–Int	22–33–0	19–30–0
Turnovers	0	0
Time of possession	30:53	29:07

Team	Category	Player	Statistics
Cal Poly	Passing	Ty Dieffenbach	18/27, 263 yards, 2 TD
Cal Poly	Rushing	Ty Dieffenbach	11 carries, 69 yards, TD
Cal Poly	Receiving	Michael Briscoe	7 receptions, 110 yards, 2 TD
San Diego	Passing	Dom Nankil	19/30, 202 yards. TD
San Diego	Rushing	Adam Criter	1 carry, 79 yards, TD
San Diego	Receiving	Josh Heverly	8 receptions, 69 yards

=== at No. 25 (FBS) Utah ===
Cal Poly Mustangs (1–0) at No. 25 (FBS) Utah Utes (1–0) – Game summary

Quarter	1	2	3	4	Total
Mustangs	3	3	0	3	9
No. 25 (FBS) Utes	14	21	21	7	63

at Rice–Eccles Stadium • Salt Lake City, Utah

- Date: September 6
- Game time: 3:00 p.m. PDT/4:00 p.m. MDT
- Game weather: Rain, 69 °F (21 °C)
- Game attendance: 51,463
- Referee: Lyndon Nixon
- TV announcers (ESPN+): Mark Neely and Barrett Brooks

Game information

First quarter

- UTAH – Wayshawn Parker 52-yard pass from Devon Dampier (Dillon Curtis kick), 13:08. Utes 7–0. Drive: 6 plays, 75 yards, 1:52.
- UTAH – Jackson Bennee 46-yard interception return (Dillon Curtis kick), 7:15. Utes 14–0.
- CP – Noah Serna 30-yard field goal, 4:21. Utes 14–3. Drive: 7 plays, 63 yards, 2:54.

Second quarter

- UTAH – Ryan Davis 4-yard pass from Devon Dampier (Dillon Curtis kick), 14:20. Utes 21–3. Drive: 12 plays, 65 yards, 5:01.
- CP – Gianluca Dimauro 47-yard field goal, 7:04. Utes 21–6. Drive: 10 plays, 39 yards, 4:21.
- UTAH – NaQuari Rogers 1-yard run (Dillon Curtis kick), 1:44. Utes 28–6. Drive: 1 play, 1 yard, 0:03.
- UTAH – NaQuari Rogers 1-yard run (Dillon Curtis kick), 0:03. Utes 35–6. Drive: 6 plays, 30 yards, 0:36.

Third quarter

- UTAH – Dallen Bentley 11-yard pass from Devon Dampier (Dillon Curtis kick), 9:48. Utes 42–6. Drive: 10 plays, 70 yards, 4:14.
- UTAH – Wayshawn Parker 43-yard run (Dillon Curtis kick), 7:12. Utes 49–6. Drive: 2 plays, 50 yards, 0:36.
- UTAH – Byrd Ficklin 38-yard run (Dillon Curtis kick), 1:24. Utes 56–6. Drive: 6 plays, 95 yards, 2:45.

Fourth quarter

- CP – Noah Serna 51-yard field goal, 11:13. Utes 56–9. Drive: 9 plays, 42 yards, 5:11.
- UTAH – Byrd Ficklin 2-yard run (Dillon Curtis kick), 2:12. Utes 63–9. Drive: 15 plays, 75 yards, 9:01.

Statistics	CP	UTAH
First downs	12	24
Plays–yards	58–223	73–518
Rushes–yards	28–65	46–273
Passing yards	158	245
Passing: comp–att–int	15–30–0	21–27–0
Turnovers	2	0
Time of possession	28:45	31:15

Team	Category	Player	Statistics
Cal Poly	Passing	Ty Dieffenbach	6/9, 82 yards, INT
Cal Poly	Rushing	Anthony Grigsby Jr.	10 carries, 25 yards
Cal Poly	Receiving	Kian Salehi	3 receptions, 44 yards
Utah	Passing	Devon Dampier	17/23, 192 yards, 3 TD
Utah	Rushing	Nate Johnson	11 carries, 59 yards
Utah	Receiving	Ryan Davis	6 receptions, 58 yards, TD

=== Western Oregon (DII) ===
Western Oregon Wolves (DII) (1-0) at Cal Poly Mustangs (1-1) – Game summary

Quarter	1	2	3	4	Total
Wolves (DII)	0	0	7	0	7
Mustangs	14	21	7	14	56

at Alex G. Spanos Stadium • San Luis Obispo, California

- Date: September 13
- Game time: 5:00 PM PDT
- Game weather: Sunny • Temperature: 73 °F (23 °C) • Wind: NW at 10 miles per hour (16 km/h)
- Game attendance: 11,075
- Referee: Spencer Mumford
- TV announcers (ESPN+): Chris Sylvester and John Kane

Game information

First quarter

- CP – Michael Briscoe 70-yard pass from Ty Dieffenbach (Noah Serna kick), 12:53. Mustangs 7–0. Drive: 1 play, 70 yards, 0:09.
- CP – Michael Briscoe 25-yard pass from Ty Dieffenbach (Noah Serna kick), 10:07. Mustangs 14–0. Drive: 4 plays, 45 yards, 1:16.

Second quarter

- CP – Michael Briscoe 2-yard pass from Ty Dieffenbach (Gianluca Dimauro kick), 12:01. Mustangs 21–0. Drive: 10 plays, 80 yards, 3:08.
- CP – Anthony Grigsby Jr. 4-yard run (Gianluca Dimauro kick), 4:52. Mustangs 28–0. Drive: 9 plays, 72 yards, 3:36.
- CP – Michael Briscoe 5-yard pass from Anthony Grigsby (Noah Serna kick), 0:22. Mustangs 35–0. Drive: 9 plays, 80 yards, 1:18.

Third quarter

- CP – Trey Wilson 2-yard run (Gianluca Dimauro kick), 9:59. Mustangs 42–0. Drive: 5 plays, 70 yards, 2:26.
- WOR – Cody Hall 29-yard pass from Jordan McCarty (Zane Colson kick), 5:40. Mustangs 42–7. Drive: 8 plays, 73 yards, 4:17.

Fourth quarter

- CP – Kendric Sanders 6-yard run (Noah Serna kick), 8:06. Mustangs 49–7. Drive: 8 plays, 72 yards, 4:20.
- CP – Kresean Kizzy 74-yard interception return (Gianluca Dimauro kick), 2:43. Mustangs 56–7.

Statistics	WOR	CP
First downs	16	23
Plays–yards	69–328	73–516
Rushes–yards	29–67	38–140
Passing yards	261	376
Passing: Comp–Att–Int	23–40–2	20–35–2
Turnovers	2	2
Time of possession	31:02	28:58

Team	Category	Player	Statistics
Western Oregon	Passing	Jordan McCarty	23/40, 261 yards, TD, 2 INT
Western Oregon	Rushing	Jordon McCarty	11 carries, 25 yards
Western Oregon	Receiving	Carson Workman	3 receptions, 45 yards
Cal Poly	Passing	Ty Dieffenbach	8/11, 192 yards, 3 TD
Cal Poly	Rushing	Tyrei Washington	5 carries, 39 yards
Cal Poly	Receiving	Michael Briscoe	6 receptions, 148 yards, 4 TD

=== at Stephen F. Austin ===
Cal Poly Mustangs (2–1) at Stephen F. Austin Lumberjacks (1–2) – Game summary

Quarter	1	2	3	4	Total
Mustangs	3	7	0	7	17
Lumberjacks	0	14	21	0	35

at Homer Bryce Stadium • Nacogdoches, Texas

- Date: September 20
- Game time: 5:00 p.m. PDT
- Game weather: Sunny • Temperature: 90 °F (32 °C) • Wind: at 7 miles per hour (11 km/h)
- Game attendance: 5,402
- Referee: James Brookhart
- TV announcers (ESPN+): Rob Myers (play-by-play) and Hunter Taylor (analyst)
- Box score, Recap

Game information

First quarter

- CP – Noah Serna 44-yard field goal, 2:31. Mustangs 3–0. Drive: 11 plays, 73 yards, 5:22.

Second quarter

- SFA – Clayton Wayland 13-yard pass from Sam Vidlak (Carlos Alvarado kick), 14:55. Lumberjacks 7–3. Drive: 3 plays, 26 yards, 0:26.
- CP – Michael Briscoe 64-yard pass from Jackson Akins (Gianluca Dimauro kick), 13:02. Mustangs 10–7. Drive: 6 plays, 75 yards, 1:53.
- SFA – Kylon Harris 65-yard punt return (Carlos Alvarado kick), 2:26. Lumberjacks 14–10.

Third quarter

- SFA – Malachi Williams 28-yard interception return (Carlos Alvarado kick), 14:16. Lumberjacks 21–10.
- SFA – Richard Reese 1-yard run (Carlos Alvarado kick), 7:31. Lumberjacks 28–10. Drive: 5 plays, 57 yards, 1:34.
- SFA – Derrick Bohler 28-yard pass from Sam Vidlak (Carlos Alvarado kick), 1:23. Lumberjacks 35–10. Drive: 4 plays, 82 yards, 1:31.

Fourth quarter

- CP – Kian Salehi 41-yard pass from Bo Kelly (Gianluca Dimauro kick), 2:59. Lumberjacks 35–17. Drive: 3 plays, 52 yards, 1:19.

Statistics	CP	SFA
First downs	19	18
Plays–yards	71–357	67–354
Rushes–yards	32–69	37–164
Passing yards	288	190
Passing: Comp–Att–Int	19–39–3	19–30–0
Turnovers	3	1
Time of possession	31:51	28:09

Team	Category	Player	Statistics
Cal Poly	Passing	Jackson Akins	13/29, 182 yards, TD, 3 INT
Cal Poly	Rushing	Jackson Akins	10 carries, 36 yards
Cal Poly	Receiving	Michael Briscoe	4 receptions, 140 yards, TD
Stephen F. Austin	Passing	Sam Vidlak	16/23, 178 yards, 2 TD
Stephen F. Austin	Rushing	Jerrell Wimbley	10 carries, 130 yards
Stephen F. Austin	Receiving	Clayton Wayland	3 receptions, 57 yards, TD

=== at No. 21 Sacramento State ===
Cal Poly Mustangs (2–2) at No. 21 Sacramento State Hornets (2–2) – Game summary

Quarter	1	2	3	4	Total
Mustangs	18	7	7	0	32
No. 21 Hornets	7	14	0	3	24

at Hornet Stadium • Sacramento, California

- Date: September 27
- Game time: 6:00 p.m. PDT
- Game weather: Sunny • Temperature: 76 °F (24 °C) • Wind: SW at 11 miles per hour (18 km/h)
- Game attendance: 15,016
- Referee: Kelly Holman
- TV announcers (ESPN+): Jason Ross (play-by-play) and Darren Arbet (analyst)

Game information

First quarter

- SAC – Sam Adams II 23-yard pass from Rodney Hammond Jr. (Grant Meadors kick), 11:47. Hornets 7–0. Drive: 7 plays, 75 yards, 3:13.
- CP – Brian Dukes Jr. 23-yard interception return (Tyrei Washington run), 6:59. Mustangs 8–7.
- CP – Jordan Garrison 55-yard pass from Bo Kelly (Noah Serna kick), 3:44. Mustangs 15–7. Drive: 4 plays, 76 yards, 1:04.
- CP – Gianluca Dimauro 27-yard field goal, 0:56. Mustangs 18–7. Drive: 6 plays, 11 yards, 2:18.

Second quarter

- SAC – Ernest Campbell 62-yard pass from Cardell Williams (Grant Meadors kick), 14:52. Mustangs 18–14. Drive: 3 plays, 70 yards, 0:56.
- SAC – Cardell Williams 15-yard run (Grant Meadors kick), 5:18. Hornets 21–18. Drive: 13 plays, 80 yards, 6:12.
- CP – Tyrei Washington 1-yard run (Noah Serna kick), 2:06. Mustangs 25–21. Drive: 7 plays, 75 yards, 3:12.

Third quarter

- CP – Jordan Garrison 5-yard pass from Bo Kelly (Noah Serna kick), 5:46. Mustangs 32–21. Drive: 7 plays, 86 yards, 3:47.

Fourth quarter

- SAC – Grant Meadors 30-yard field goal, 12:54. Mustangs 32–24. Drive: 10 plays, 67 yards, 3:36.

Statistics	CP	SAC
First downs	17	20
Plays–yards	66–381	77–426
Rushes–yards	39–178	46–230
Passing yards	203	196
Passing: Comp–Att–Int	17–27–0	12–31–3
Turnovers	0	3
Time of possession	31:42	28:18

Team	Category	Player	Statistics
Cal Poly	Passing	Bo Kelly	17/27, 203 yards, 2 TD
Cal Poly	Rushing	Tyrei Washington	22 carries, 113 yards, TD
Cal Poly	Receiving	Jordan Garrison	4 receptions, 73 yards, 2 TD
Sacramento State	Passing	Cardell Williams	10/24, 164 yards, TD, 3 INT
Sacramento State	Rushing	Rodney Hammond Jr.	19 carries, 105 yards
Sacramento State	Receiving	Ernest Campbell	3 receptions, 91 yards, TD

=== No. 7 UC Davis ===
No. 7 UC Davis Aggies (3–1) at Cal Poly Mustangs (3–2) – Game summary

Quarter	1	2	3	4	Total
No. 7 Aggies	0	13	7	14	34
Mustangs	7	3	10	7	27

at Alex G. Spanos Stadium • San Luis Obispo, CA

- Date: October 4
- Game time: 5:00 PM PDT
- Game weather: Sunny • Temperature: 71 °F (22 °C) • Wind: NW at 10 miles per hour (16 km/h)
- Game attendance: 10,006
- Referee: Robert Quello
- TV announcers (ESPN+): Chris Sylvester (play-by-play) and John Kane (analyst)

Game information

First quarter

- (9:27) CP – Logan Booher 23-yard pass from Bo Kelly, Noah Serna kick (Drive: 12 plays, 69 yards, 5:26; Cal Poly 7–0)

Second quarter

- (13:25) UCD – Zach Jones 36-yard pass from Caden Pinnick, Hunter Ridley kick (Drive: 5 plays, 67 yards, 1:50; Tied 7–7)
- (7:24) CP – Gianluca Dimauro 33-yard field goal (Drive: 12 plays, 73 yards, 6:01; Cal Poly 10–7)
- (1:54) UCD – Samuel Gbatu Jr. 6-yard pass from Caden Pinnick (Drive: 11 plays, 73 yards, 5:23; UC Davis 13–10)

Third quarter

- (7:42) CP – Noah Serna 30-yard field goal (Drive: 12 plays, 52 yards, 5:17; Tied 13–13)
- (4:03) UCD – Zach Jones 6-yard pass from Caden Pinnick, Hunter Ridley kick (Drive: 8 plays, 75 yards, 3:39; UC Davis 20–13)
- (1:04) CP – Logan Booher 24-yard pass from Bo Kelly, Noah Serna kick (Drive: 8 plays, 71 yards, 2:53; Tied 20–20)

Fourth quarter

- (11:20) UCD – Carter Vargas 9-yard run, Hunter Ridley kick (Drive: 9 plays, 75 yards, 4:44; UC Davis 27–20)
- (6:05) UCD – Caden Pinnick 7-yard run, Hunter Ridley kick (Drive: 6 plays, 83 yards, 3:35; UC Davis 34–20)
- (1:55) CP – Bo Kelly 1-yard pass from Michael Briscoe, Noah Serna kick (Drive: 6 plays, 80 yards, 1:34; UC Davis 34–27)

Statistics	UCD	CP
First downs	23	21
Plays–yards	63–449	70–342
Rushes–yards	37–136	31–71
Passing yards	313	271
Passing: Comp–Att–Int	21–26–0	22–39–0
Turnovers	0	0
Time of possession	30:09	29:51

Team	Category	Player	Statistics
UC Davis	Passing	Caden Pinnick	21/26, 313 yards, 3 TD
UC Davis	Rushing	Caden Pinnick	11 carries, 60 yards, TD
UC Davis	Receiving	Stacy Dobbins	3 receptions, 89 yards
Cal Poly	Passing	Bo Kelly	20/37, 251 yards, 2 TD
Cal Poly	Rushing	Trey Wilson	11 carries, 33 yards
Cal Poly	Receiving	Logan Booher	6 receptions, 101 yards, 2 TD

=== at No. 4 Montana ===
Cal Poly Mustangs (3–3) at No. 4 Montana Grizzlies (5–0) – Game summary

Quarter	1	2	3	4	Total
Mustangs	0	9	0	0	9
No. 4 Grizzlies	0	0	7	21	28

at Washington–Grizzly Stadium • Missoula, Montana

- Date: October 11
- Game time: 1:00 p.m. PDT/2:00 p.m. MDT
- Game weather: Sunny, 56 °F (13 °C)
- Game attendance: 26,347
- Referee: Jim Crowley
- TV announcers (ESPN+): Trey Bender (play-by-play), Jordan Tripp (analyst) and Kyle Hansen (sideline)

Game information

First quarter

- No scoring plays.

Second quarter

- CP – Brooks Wheatley 26-yard pass from Ty Dieffenbach (run failed), 12:20. Mustangs 6–0. Drive: 4 plays, 79 yards, 1:38.
- CP – Noah Serna 27-yard field goal, 0:00. Mustangs 9–0. Drive: 9 plays, 70 yards, 1:02.

Third quarter

- MONT – Kenzel Lawler 21-yard interception return (Ty Morrison kick), 11:12. Mustangs 9–7.

Fourth quarter

- MONT – Michael Wortham 24-yard pass from Keali'i Ah Yat (Ty Morrison kick), 13:37. Grizzlies 14–9. Drive: 14 plays, 96 yards, 6:26.
- MONT – Eli Gillman 17-yard run (Ty Morrison kick), 9:35. Grizzlies 21–9. Drive: 3 plays, 50 yards, 1:26.
- MONT – Eli Gillman 13-yard run (Ty Morrison kick), 1:55. Grizzlies 28–9. Drive: 14 plays, 75 yards, 6:44.

Statistics	CP	MONT
First downs	11	27
Plays–yards	57–336	85–434
Rushes–yards	18–111	44–177
Passing yards	225	257
Passing: Comp–Att–Int	16–39–4	27–41–1
Turnovers	4	2
Time of possession	20:06	39:54

Team	Category	Player	Statistics
Cal Poly	Passing	Ty Dieffenbach	15/33, 225 yards, TD, 4 INT
Cal Poly	Rushing	Paul Hoyfield Jr.	8 carries, 53 yards
Cal Poly	Receiving	Alek Marshall	2 receptions, 59 yards
Montana	Passing	Keali'i Ah Yat	27/41, 257 yards, TD, INT
Montana	Rushing	Eli Gillman	18 carries, 123 yards, 2 TD
Montana	Receiving	Michael Wortham	10 receptions, 84 yards, TD

=== No. 5 Montana State ===
No. 5 Montana State Bobcats (5–2) at Cal Poly Mustangs (3–4) – Game summary

Quarter	1	2	3	4	Total
No. 5 Bobcats	3	10	7	14	34
Mustangs	0	3	0	14	17

at Alex G. Spanos Stadium • San Luis Obispo, California

- Date: October 25
- Game time: 5:00 p.m. PDT
- Game weather: Sunny • Temperature: 67 °F (19 °C) • Wind: NW at 10 miles per hour (16 km/h)
- Game attendance: 6,403
- Referee: Mike Bezner
- TV announcers (ESPN+): Ben Creighton (play-by-play), Ty Gregorak (analyst) and Grace Lawrence (sideline)

Game information

First quarter

- MTST – Myles Sansted 25-yard field goal, 3:06. Bobcats 3–0. Drive: 15 plays, 56 yards, 7:23.

Second quarter

- MTST – Jared White 19-yard pass from Justin Lamson (Myles Sansted kick), 8:16. Bobcats 10–0. Drive: 4 plays, 45 yards, 1:50.
- CP – Noah Serna 21-yard field goal, 2:52. Bobcats 10–3. Drive: 12 plays, 72 yards, 5:19.
- MTST – Myles Sansted 31-yard field goal, 0:04. Bobcats 13–3. Drive: 8 plays, 30 yards, 0:52.

Third quarter

- MTST – Julius Davis 10-yard run (Myles Sansted kick), 10:59. Bobcats 20–3. Drive: 7 plays, 73 yards, 3:56.

Fourth quarter

- MTST – Justin Lamson 4-yard run (Myles Sansted kick), 14:52. Bobcats 27–3. Drive: 9 plays, 80 yards, 4:33.
- CP – Fidel Tau Pitts 16-yard pass from Bo Kelly (Gianluca Dimauro kick), 12:25. Bobcats 27–10. Drive: 6 plays, 77 yards, 2:23.
- CP – Logan Booher 6-yard pass from Bo Kelly (Noah Serna kick), 8:16. Bobcats 27–17. Drive: 7 plays, 56 yards, 3:22.
- MTST – Adam Jones 1-yard run (Myles Sansted kick), 3:35. Bobcats 34–17. Drive: 8 plays, 40 yards, 4:31.

Statistics	MTST	CP
First downs	26	12
Plays–yards	80–466	50–241
Rushes–yards	50–290	15–50
Passing yards	176	191
Passing: Comp–Att–Int	19–30–0	22–35–1
Turnovers	1	1
Time of possession	36:31	23:29

Team	Category	Player	Statistics
Montana State	Passing	Justin Lamson	19/30, 176 yards, TD
Montana State	Rushing	Julius Davis	19 carries, 175 yards, TD
Montana State	Receiving	Taco Dowler	6 receptions, 57 yards
Cal Poly	Passing	Bo Kelly	20/30, 188 yards, 2 TD, INT
Cal Poly	Rushing	Trey Wilson	6 carries, 21 yards
Cal Poly	Receiving	Michael Briscoe	4 receptions, 39 yards

=== Portland State ===
Portland State Vikings (0–8) at Cal Poly Mustangs (3–5) – Game summary

Quarter	1	2	3	4	Total
Vikings	14	10	10	6	40
Mustangs	7	7	14	7	35

at Alex G. Spanos Stadium • San Luis Obispo, California

- Date: November 1
- Game time: 2:00 p.m. PDT
- Game weather: Sunny • Temperature: 71 °F (22 °C) • Wind: NW at 10 miles per hour (16 km/h)
- Game attendance: 8,035
- Referee: Jim Crowley
- TV: ESPN+
- Box score, Recap

Game information

First quarter

- PRST – Delon Thompson 30-yard pass from John-Keawe Sagapolutele (Mathias Uribe kick), 7:48. Vikings 7–0. Drive: 1 play, 20 yards, 0:24.
- CP – Ty Dieffenbach 16-yard run (Noah Serna kick), 4:06. Tied 7–7. Drive: 7 plays, 49 yards, 3:44.
- PRST – Delon Thompson 2-yard run (Mathias Uribe kick), 0:39. Vikings 14–7. Drive: 7 plays, 65 yards, 3:27.

Second quarter

- PRST – Delon Thompson 1-yard run (Mathias Uribe kick), 11:26. Vikings 21–7. Drive: 5 plays, 52 yards, 2:51.
- CP – Kendric Sanders 4-yard run (Gianluca Dimauro kick), 6:04. Vikings 21–14. Drive: 9 plays, 75 yards, 5:18.
- PRST – Mathias Uribe 33-yard field goal, 3:53. Vikings 24–14. Drive: 6 plays, 56 yards, 2:05.

Third quarter

- PRST – Delon Thompson 77-yard run (Mathias Uribe kick), 13:31. Vikings 31–14. Drive: 1 play, 77 yards, 0:13.
- CP – Misa Paiau 1-yard run (Gianluca Dimauro kick), 9:11. Vikings 31–21. Drive: 8 plays, 76 yards, 4:17.
- CP – Misa Paiau 1-yard pass from Ty Dieffenbach (Gianluca Dimauro kick), 4:58. Vikings 31–28. Drive: 4 plays, 59 yards, 1:23.
- PRST – Mathias Uribe 37-yard field goal, 0:52. Vikings 34–28. Drive: 8 plays, 45 yards, 4:01.

Fourth quarter

- PRST – Tyrese Smith 6-yard run (pass failed), 13:16. Vikings 40–28. Drive: 5 plays, 15 yards, 1:46.
- CP – Ty Dieffenbach 1-yard run (Noah Serna kick), 0:55. Vikings 40–35. Drive: 3 plays, 65 yards, 0:38.

Statistics	PRST	CP
First downs	22	21
Plays–yards	73–502	61–450
Rushes–yards	43–242	36–243
Passing yards	260	207
Passing: Comp–Att–Int	18–30–2	14–25–2
Turnovers	2	3
Time of possession	32:59	27:01

Team	Category	Player	Statistics
Portland State	Passing	John-Keawe Sagapolutele	17/26, 252 yards, TD, INT
Portland State	Rushing	Delon Thompson	26 carries, 184 yards, 3 TD
Portland State	Receiving	Terence Loville	4 receptions, 86 yards
Cal Poly	Passing	Ty Dieffenbach	14/23, 207 yards, TD, INT
Cal Poly	Rushing	Kendric Sanders	14 carries, 121 yards, TD
Cal Poly	Receiving	Michael Briscoe	4 receptions, 81 yards

=== at Idaho State ===
Cal Poly Mustangs (3–6) at Idaho State Bengals (3–6) – Game summary

Quarter	1	2	3	4	Total
Mustangs	0	7	3	7	17
Bengals	14	7	3	3	27

at ICCU Dome • Pocatello, Idaho

- Date: November 8
- Game time: 3:00 p.m. PST/4:00 p.m. MST
- Game weather: None (played indoors)
- Game attendance: 5,646
- Referee: Gregg Wilson
- TV: ESPN+
- Box score, Recap

Game information

First quarter

- IDST – Michael Shulikov 17-yard pass from Jordan Cooke (Trajan Sinatra kick), 12:55. Bengals 7–0. Drive: 6 plays, 74 yards, 2:00.
- IDST – Jordan Cooke 3-yard run (Trajan Sinatra kick), 4:53. Bengals 14–0. Drive: 12 plays, 91 yards, 5:09.

Second quarter

- CP – Ty Dieffenbach 17-yard run (Gianluca Dimauro kick), 1:31. Bengals 14–7. Drive: 8 plays, 80 yards, 2:47.
- IDST – Dason Brooks 5-yard run (Trajan Sinatra kick), 0:08. Bengals 21–7. Drive: 7 plays, 75 yards, 1:23.

Third quarter

- IDST – Trajan Sinatra 19-yard field goal, 7:44. Bengals 24–7. Drive: 12 plays, 48 yards, 5:40.
- CP – Noah Serna 36-yard field goal, 2:07. Bengals 24–10. Drive: 15 plays, 57 yards, 5:37.

Fourth quarter

- IDST – Trajan Sinatra 20-yard field goal, 9:54. Bengals 27–10. Drive: 14 plays, 72 yards, 7:13.
- CP – Fidel Tau Pitts 15-yard pass from Ty Dieffenbach (Gianluca Dimauro kick), 2:27. Bengals 27–17. Drive: 15 plays, 80 yards, 7:20.

Statistics	CP	IDST
First downs	23	28
Plays–yards	69–409	72–451
Rushes–yards	40–237	35–176
Passing yards	172	275
Passing: Comp–Att–Int	18–29–1	27–37–0
Turnovers	1	0
Time of possession	30:22	29:38

Team	Category	Player	Statistics
Cal Poly	Passing	Ty Dieffenbach	18/29, 172 yards, TD, INT
Cal Poly	Rushing	Ty Dieffenbach	18 carries, 142 yards, TD
Cal Poly	Receiving	Michael Briscoe	5 receptions, 81 yards
Idaho State	Passing	Jordan Cooke	27/37, 275 yards, TD
Idaho State	Rushing	Dason Brooks	20 carries, 106 yards, TD
Idaho State	Receiving	Michael Sulikov	4 receptions, 72 yards, TD

=== at No. 24 Northern Arizona ===
Cal Poly Mustangs (3–7) at No. 24 Northern Arizona Lumberjacks (6–4) – Game summary

Quarter	1	2	3	4	Total
Mustangs	7	10	3	7	27
No. 24 Lumberjacks	7	15	10	3	35

at Walkup Skydome • Flagstaff, Arizona

- Date: November 15
- Game time: 1:00 p.m. PST/2:00 p.m. MST
- Game weather: none (played indoors)
- Game attendance: 7,472
- Referee: Kelly Holman
- TV: ESPN+

Game information

First quarter

- NAU – Kolbe Katsis 6-yard pass from Ty Pennington (Samuel Hunsaker kick), 8:25. Lumberjacks 7–0. Drive: 8 plays, 72 yards, 4:33.
- CP – Fidel Tau Pitts 20-yard pass from Ty Dieffenbach (Noah Serna kick), 2:40. Tied 7–7. Drive: 11 plays, 75 yards, 5:45.

Second quarter

- NAU – Darvon Hubbard 2-yard pass from Ty Pennington (Samuel Hunsaker kick), 1:14. Lumberjacks 14–7. Drive: 6 plays, 42 yards, 2:39.
- CP – Gianluca Dimauro 51-yard field goal, 0:40. Lumberjacks 14–10. Drive: 4 plays, 0 yards, 0:22.
- NAU – Kolbe Katsis 75-yard pass from Ty Pennington (Ty Pennington–Hayden Daugherty pass), 0:24. Lumberjacks 22–10. Drive: 1 play, 75 yards, 0:16.
- CP – Fidel Tau Pitts 57-yard pass from Anthony Grigsby Jr. (Noah Serna kick), 0:00. Lumberjacks 22–17. Drive: 3 plays, 68 yards, 0:16.

Third quarter

- NAU – Kolbe Katsis 38-yard pass from Ty Pennington (Samuel Hunsaker kick), 12:53. Lumberjacks 29–17. Drive: 4 plays, 75 yards, 2:07.
- CP – Gianluca Dimauro 39-yard field goal, 8:19. Lumberjacks 29–20. Drive: 9 plays, 27 yards, 2:49.
- NAU – Samuel Hunsaker 42-yard field goal, 2:33. Lumberjacks 32–20. Drive: 4 plays, 4 yards, 1:26.

Fourth quarter

- CP – Anthony Grigsby Jr. 2-yard run (Noah Serna kick), 7:44. Lumberjacks 32–27. Drive: 7 plays, 60 yards, 2:32.
- NAU – Samuel Hunsaker 37-yard field goal, 5:02. Lumberjacks 35–27. Drive: 6 plays, 56 yards, 2:42.

Statistics	CP	NAU
First downs	17	23
Plays–yards	68–356	63–495
Rushes–yards	32–86	34–139
Passing yards	270	356
Passing: Comp–Att–Int	15–36–3	22–29–1
Turnovers	3	1
Time of possession	26:53	33:07

Team	Category	Player	Statistics
Cal Poly	Passing	Anthony Grigsby Jr.	5/12, 151 yards, TD, INT
Cal Poly	Rushing	Tyrei Washington	6 carries, 28 yards
Cal Poly	Receiving	Fidel Tau Pitts	4 receptions, 138 yards, 2 TD
Northern Arizona	Passing	Ty Pennington	22/29, 356 yards, 4 TD, INT
Northern Arizona	Rushing	Seth Cromwell	16 carries, 85 yards
Northern Arizona	Receiving	Kolbe Katsis	6 receptions, 148 yards, 3 TD

=== Eastern Washington ===
Eastern Washington Eagles (5–6) at Cal Poly Mustangs (3–8) – Game summary

Quarter	1	2	3	4	Total
Eagles	14	10	10	0	34
Mustangs	21	6	3	13	43

at Alex G. Spanos Stadium • San Luis Obispo, California

- Date: November 22
- Game time: 2:00 p.m. PST
- Game weather: Sunny • Temperature: 70 °F (21 °C) • Wind: NW at 10 miles per hour (16 km/h)
- Game attendance: 6,732
- Referee: Spencer Mumford
- TV: ESPN+

Game information

First quarter

- CP – Logan Booher 31-yard pass from Anthony Grigsby Jr. (Noah Serna kick), 14:24. Mustangs 7–0. Drive: 1 play, 31 yards, 0:05.
- CP – Antonio Vakameilalo 1-yard run (Gianluca Dimauro kick), 7:50. Mustangs 14–0. Drive: 12 plays, 53 yards, 4:29.
- EWU – Kaden Rolfsness 7-yard run (Soren McKee kick), 4:24. Mustangs 14–7. Drive: 4 plays, 22 yards, 1:27.
- CP – Alek Marshall 54-yard pass from Anthony Grigsby Jr. (Noah Serna kick), 2:51. Mustangs 21–7. Drive: 4 plays, 75 yards, 1:33.
- EWU – Kaden Rolfsness 1-yard run (Soren McKee kick), 1:25. Mustangs 21–14. Drive: 3 plays, 6 yards, 1:13.

Second quarter

- CP – Noah Serna 32-yard field goal, 9:22. Mustangs 24–14. Drive: 10 plays, 32 yards, 3:44.
- EWU – Noah Cronquist 12-yard pass from Kaden Rolfsness (Soren McKee kick), 4:51. Mustangs 24–21. Drive: 10 plays, 62 yards, 4:25.
- CP – Gianluca Dimauro 48-yard field goal, 0:16. Mustangs 27–21. Drive: 7 plays, 14 yards, 0:46.
- EWU – Soren McKee 50-yard field goal, 0:00. Mustangs 27–24. Drive: 2 plays, 18 yards, 0:12.

Third quarter

- EWU – Soren McKee 32-yard field goal, 8:09. Tied 27–27. Drive: 9 plays, 40 yards, 2:32.
- CP – Noah Serna 44-yard field goal, 5:22. Mustangs 30–27. Drive: 6 plays, 49 yards, 2:47.
- EWU – Kaden Rolfsness 13-yard run (Soren McKee kick), 2:56. Eagles 34–30. Drive: 8 plays, 57 yards, 2:21.

Fourth quarter

- CP – Fidel Tau Pitts 16-yard pass from Anthony Grigsby Jr. (Noah Serna kick), 13:50. Mustangs 37–34. Drive: 11 plays, 75 yards, 4:06.
- CP – Tyrei Washington 33-yard run (Noah Serna kick BLOCKED), 7:06. Mustangs 43–34. Drive: 5 plays, 56 yards, 1:29.

Statistics	EWU	CP
First downs	18	22
Plays–yards	74–318	87–500
Rushes–yards	32–82	50–159
Passing yards	236	341
Passing: Comp–Att–Int	23–42–3	21–37–2
Turnovers	3	4
Time of possession	27:28	32:32

Team	Category	Player	Statistics
Eastern Washington	Passing	Kaden Rolfsness	23/42, 236 yards, TD, 3 INT
Eastern Washington	Rushing	Kaden Rolfsness	19 carries, 56 yards, 3 TD
Eastern Washington	Receiving	Wesley Garrett	5 receptions, 63 yards
Cal Poly	Passing	Anthony Grigsby Jr.	21/37, 341 yards, 3 TD, 2 INT
Cal Poly	Rushing	Tyrei Washington	21 carries, 99 yards, TD
Cal Poly	Receiving	Logan Booher	7 receptions, 126 yards, TD

== Roster ==
2025 Cal Poly Mustangs football team roster
Players
Coaches
Offense

Pos.	#	Name	Class
WR	0	Logan Booher	Sr
QB	1	Anthony Grigsby Jr.	Jr
WR	2	Antoine Sullivan	Jr
QB	3	Bo Kelly	Jr
RB	4	Jaedon Matthews	Fr
WR	5	Jordan Garrison	So
WR	6	Fidel Pitts	Jr
QB	7	Ty Dieffenbach	So
WR	8	Kian Salehi	So
WR	9	Brooks Wheatley	So
WR	10	Michael Briscoe	Sr
WR	11	Savion Taylor	Fr
QB	12	Jackson Akins	So
QB	13	Sam Wulff	Fr
WR	14	Aiden Hall	Fr
TE	15	Sam Hedrick	Sr
QB	16	Lucas Razore	Fr
WR	17	Makai Puga	Jr
WR	18	Josiah Lamarque	Fr
RB	19	Zion Hall	Sr
RB	20	Trey Wilson	Fr
RB	21	Troy Fletcher	Jr
RB	22	Paul Holyfield Jr.	Jr
RB	23	Tyrei Washington	Jr
TE	24	Michael Otterstedt	Sr
WR	25	Joey Villaroman	So
RB	26	Malachi Brown	Fr
RB	30	Boxer Kopcsak-Yeung	Fr
WR	32	Nolan Cummings	So
RB	34	Kendric Sanders	So
TE	39	Caden Rose	Fr
OL	54	Hayden Jones	Jr
OL	55	Tristan Fui	Fr
OL	59	Tyler Charbonneau	Sr
OL	61	Abu Fofanah	Fr
OL	62	Jonathan Ybarra	Fr
OL	65	Leif Magnuson	GS
OL	66	Kamani Fifita	Fr
OL	67	Leo Cocchiglia	Fr
OL	69	Enzo Hall	Fr
OL	70	Charlie Adams	So
OL	71	Anthony Patt	GS
OL	72	Matthew Mena	Jr
OL	73	Dawson Kerezsi	Fr
OL	74	Jasdev Banwait	Jr
OL	75	Tanner Hirschler	Jr
OL	76	Trevor Newkirk	Fr
OL	77	Keanon McNally	So
OL	78	Racin Delgatty	So
OL	79	Miles Medina	So
WR	80	Cal Zimmerman	Fr
WR	81	Myles Tarkington	Fr
WR	82	Maurie Phillips-Porter	Fr
WR	83	Bain Eiseman	Fr
TE	84	Nic Sani	GS
TE	85	Alek Marshall	So
WR	86	Brady Pohl	Fr
WR	87	Aaron Okoro	GS
TE	88	Reese Brooks	Fr
TE	89	Tyler Hoffman	Jr

Defense

Pos.	#	Name	Class
CB	0	Darren Barkins	Sr
S	1	Jeremiah Bernard	So
LB	2	Troy Bean	So
LB	3	Ethan Calvert	Sr
CB	4	Calvin Moore	So
CB	5	Tayten Beyer	Fr
CB	6	Justus Woods	So
S	7	Jake East	Jr
S	8	DeMel Turner	Jr
S	9	Brian Dukes Jr.	Sr
DL	10	Victory Johnson	So
DL	11	J. T. Houston	Fr
LB	12	Gage Burnett	Fr
CB	13	Kresean Kizzy	So
CB	15	Budha Boyd Jr.	So
DB	16	Ethan Torres	So
LB	17	Richie Watts	Jr
LB	18	Corbin Frutos	Fr
LB	20	Kenny Olson	Jr
CB	21	CJ Solis-Lumar	Fr
LB	22	Misa Paiau	Fr
CB	23	SJ Gentle	Fr
CB	24	Amarion Orange	Fr
CB	26	Tayden Phillips	So
LB	28	Charlie Sullivan	So
CB	30	Boston Wilson	Jr
S	31	Kane Cooks	Fr
S	32	Mason Rivera	Jr
LB	33	Shane Ramstad	Fr
LB	37	Noah Sulick	Fr
DL	40	Matthew Nuanez	Sr
DL	41	Anthony Navarro	Fr
LB	42	Jake Javorsky	Fr
S	43	Caden Ritchie	Fr
LB	44	Mikey D'Amato	Jr
CB	47	Brayden Breedlove	Fr
DL	49	Julius Jordan	Jr
DL	50	Jacob Bobic	Fr
DL	51	Will Plemons	Fr
DL	58	Thomas Bouda	Sr
DL	60	Ethan Rodriguez	Sr
DL	87	Kaleb Pleis	Fr
DL	90	Bobby Piland Jr.	So
DL	91	Chase Brackney	So
DL	92	Jake Vorhees	Fr
DL	93	Manaalii Danielson	Fr
DL	94	Ish Taliauli	So
DL	95	Antonio Vakameilalo	Sr
DL	96	Mason Barbour	Sr
DL	98	Luke Westfall	Fr
DL	99	Josh Ngaluafe	Sr

Special teams

Pos.	#	Name	Class
LS	33	Spencer Moore	Sr
P	35	Jesse Ehrlich	Jr
K	38	Noah Serna	Jr
K	63	Josue Lopez	Fr
LS	64	Nehemiah Cha	Fr
K	68	Gianluca Dimauro	Jr

Head coach

- Paul Wulff

Coordinators/assistant coaches

- Will Plemons (Assistant head coach / Defensive line)
- Timm Rosenbach (Offensive coordinator / Quarterbacks)
- Cody vonAppen (Defensive coordinator / Safeties)
- Ryan Payne (Run Game coordinator / Offensive line)
- Joey Muscarella (Tight ends / Kickers & punters)
- Josh Letuligasenoa (Assistant defensive line / Outside linebackers)
- Steve Broussard (Running backs)
- Todd Sturdy (Passing Game coordinator / Wide receivers)
- Matthew Hazelwood (Defensive quality control / Special Teams coordinator / assistant safeties)
- Kevin Clune (Inside linebackers)
- Taylor Fendall (Offensive quality control / assistant offensive)
- David Stott (Defensive quality control / assistant linebackers)

Legend

- (C) Team captain
- (S) Suspended
- (I) Ineligible
- Injured
- Redshirt

Roster
Last update: June 25, 2025
