= Ficklin =

Ficklin may refer to:

- Ficklin, Illinois, an unincorporated community in Douglas County, Illinois, United States
- Ben Ficklin, Texas, county seat of Tom Green County from 1875 to 1882
- Ficklin-Crawford Cottage, historic house located at Charlottesville, Virginia

People

- Ficklin (surname)
