= Ficklin (surname) =

Ficklin is a surname, and may refer to:

- Benjamin Franklin Ficklin (1827–1871), American soldier, adventurer and entrepreneur
- Byrd Ficklin (born 2006), American football player
- Orlando B. Ficklin (1808–1886), American politician from Illinois
- Horatio Berney-Ficklin (1892–1961), British Army officer

== See also ==
- Fickling
