= Dairy Farmers, Inc =

Dairy Farmers, Inc. (DFI) is Florida’s milk promotion organization, enhancing the industry's image and increasing milk and dairy product sales statewide via marketing and education.

Florida Dairy Farmers gives awards to the top high school athletes in the state, including the Florida Mr. Basketball and Florida Mr. Football Awards.

== Related links ==
- Official Website
- National Dairy Council Website
