= Creed Whittemore =

American football player

No. 2 – Utah Utes
- Position: Wide receiver
- Class: Senior

Personal information
- Born: July 20, 2004 (age 22)
- Listed height: 5 ft 11 in (1.80 m)
- Listed weight: 182 lb (83 kg)

Career information
- High school: Buchholz (Gainesville, Florida)
- College: Mississippi State (2023–2024); Utah (2025–present)

Awards and highlights
- Florida Mr. Football (2022)
- Stats at ESPN

Creed Middleton Whittemore (born July 20, 2004) is an American college football wide receiver for the Utah Utes. He previously played for the Mississippi State Bulldogs.

== Early life ==
Creed Middleton Whittemore was born on July 20, 2004.

Whittemore attended Buchholz High School in Gainesville, Florida, where he played football as a quarterback and defensive back with his father as his head coach. He became the team's starting quarterback as a sophomore in 2020, passing for 1,675 yards and 23 touchdowns and rushing for 353 yards and two touchdowns. As a junior, Whittemore threw for 2,101 yards and 24 touchdowns and rushed for 763 yards and eight touchdowns. He helped the Bobcats compile a 12–2 record and reach the Class 7A state semifinals.

As a senior, Whittemore passed for 2,693 yards with 35 touchdowns and rushed for 1,285 yards and 17 touchdowns, while recording four interceptions on defense, helping his team advance to the Class 4S state semifinals. In a regional playoff game against Crestview, he recorded five offensive touchdowns and three interceptions on defense. Whittemore was named the Big School Offensive Player of the Year by The Gainesville Sun. He also won the Florida Mr. Football Award, becoming the first winner from Alachua County in the trophy's history. Whittemore also participated in basketball and track and field while at Buchholz. He won the district title in the 100 meter dash as a junior.

=== Recruiting ===
Whittemore was rated as a four-star recruit by ESPN and 247Sports and a three-star recruit by Rivals.com. On May 7, 2022, he verbally committed to playing college football at the University of Florida. On October 16, Whittemore de-committed from the Gators. A few hours later, he announced his commitment to Mississippi State University (MSU). Whittemore honored his commitment after the death of MSU head coach Mike Leach and signed with the Bulldogs on December 21. He was recruited by MSU (and other schools) as a wide receiver, though he also had offers to play quarterback from schools like Purdue and Maryland.

== College career ==
In two seasons at Mississippi State in 2023 and 2024, Whittemore played in 16 games with four starts. He totaled 15 receptions for 167 yards and two touchdowns to go with five carries for 101 yards and two touchdowns on the ground. After the 2024 season, during which he chose to redshirt, Whittemore entered the NCAA transfer portal. On December 15, 2024, he committed to transferring to the University of Utah.

In 2025, Whittemore tallied 12 receptions for 92 yards and one touchdown. He was a standout performer in spring camp ahead of the 2026 season. On November 14, 2026, Whittemore had the game-winning 70-yard touchdown catch with under three minutes to go in a 40–39 victory over Arizona, helping Utah secure a perfect 10–0 start to the season.

== Personal life ==
Whittemore comes from an athletic family. His father, Mark, played college football at UCF and his mother, Missy, played college volleyball at Florida. Whittemore has three brothers. Two played college football as wide receivers: Luke at Troy and Trent at Florida.
