= Mr. Football (Florida) =

The Florida Mr. Football award is an honor given to the top high school football player in the state of Florida. Awarded by Dairy Farmers, Inc. and the Florida Athletic Coaches Association, many past winners have proceeded to have successful college careers and play in the National Football League.

== Award winners ==
Professional teams listed are teams known.

Year	Player	High school	College	Professional team(s)
1992	Jammi German	Ft. Myers	Miami (FL)	Atlanta Falcons
1993	Shevin Wiggins	Manatee	Nebraska	
1994	Daunte Culpepper	Vanguard	UCF	Minnesota Vikings; Miami Dolphins; Oakland Raiders; Detroit Lions; Sacramento Mountain Lions (UFL)
1995	Frankie Franklin	Sandalwood	Holmes/Indiana	
1996	Travis Henry	Frostproof	Tennessee	Buffalo Bills; Tennessee Titans; Denver Broncos
1997	Zain Gilmore	Robinson	Missouri	Gulf Coast Raiders (AIFA)
1998	Anquan Boldin	Pahokee	Florida State	Arizona Cardinals; Baltimore Ravens; San Francisco 49ers Detroit Lions
1999	Willie Green	Osceola	Florida	
2000	Adrian McPherson	Southeast	Florida State	Indiana Firebirds (AFL); New Orleans Saints; Austin Wranglers (AFL); Grand Rapids Rampage; Montreal Alouettes (CFL)
2001	Leon Washington	Jackson	Florida State	New York Jets; Seattle Seahawks; New England Patriots; Tennessee Titans
2002	Andre Reese	Taylor	Carson–Newman College	
2003	Xavier Lee	Seabreeze	Florida State	Baltimore Ravens; Southern New Hampshire Beavers (New England Football League); Arkansas Twisters (af2); Oklahoma City Yard Dawgs (AFL); Arizona Rattlers (AFL); Pittsburgh Power (AFL); Las Vegas Locomotives (UFL)
2004	Antone Smith	Pahokee	Florida State	Detroit Lions; Minnesota Vikings; Houston Texans; Atlanta Falcons
2005	Tim Tebow	Nease	Florida	Denver Broncos; New York Jets
2006	Robert Marve	Plant	Miami (FL)/Purdue	Winnipeg Blue Bombers
2007	Jacory Harris	Miami Northwestern	Miami (FL)	Philadelphia Eagles; Edmonton Eskimos (CFL) Hamilton Tiger-Cats (CFL) Montreal Alouettes (CFL)
2008	A.J. Graham	Godby	Marshall	
2009	Matt Elam	Dwyer	Florida	Baltimore Ravens
2010	Quentin Williams	Jefferson	Bethune-Cookman	
2011	Duke Johnson	Norland	Miami (FL)	Cleveland Browns; Houston Texans; Miami Dolphins; Buffalo Bills
2012	Derrick Henry	Yulee	Alabama	Tennessee Titans; Baltimore Ravens
2013	Dalvin Cook	Miami Central	Florida State	Minnesota Vikings; New York Jets; Baltimore Ravens; Dallas Cowboys
2014	De'Andre Johnson	First Coast	Florida State/East Mississippi C.C./Florida Atlantic/Texas Southern	
2015	DeShawn Smith	Nature Coast Technical	Jones County Junior College/Florida A&M	
2016	Nick Tronti	Ponte Vedra	Indiana/Florida Atlantic	
2017	Bryce Carpenter	Venice	Coastal Carolina	
2018	Carson Beck	Mandarin	Georgia	Arizona Cardinals
2019	Demarkcus Bowman	Lakeland	Clemson / Florida / UCF	
2020	Trey Wainwright	Niceville	Furman / Fort Lauderdale	
2021	Jaylon Glover	Lake Gibson	Utah	
2022	Creed Whittemore	Buchholz	Mississippi State	
2023	Jayvan Boggs	Cocoa	Florida State	
2024	Brady Hart	Cocoa	Texas A&M	
2025	Noah Grubbs	Lake Mary High School	Notre Dame	

References

- Gator Country Staff (December 12, 2005). "Tebow '05 Florida Dairy Farmer's Mr. Football". Scout.com.
- USA Today Staff (February 3, 2007). "Marve-lous choice for Florida's Mr. Football". USA Today. Archived from the original on March 18, 2007.
- Andre C. Fernandez (January 11, 2008). "Harris Mr. Florida". Miami Herald.
