= Fickling =

Fickling is a surname. Notable people with the surname include:

- Ashley Fickling (born 1972), British footballer and physiotherapist
- Austin L. Fickling (1914–1977), American judge
- David Fickling, British children's book editor and publisher
