= Dallen Bentley =

American football player (born 2000)

No. 89 – Denver Broncos
- Position: Tight end
- Roster status: Active

Personal information
- Born: December 31, 2000 (age 25); Taylorsville, Utah, U.S.
- Listed height: 6 ft 4 in (1.93 m)
- Listed weight: 253 lb (115 kg)

Career information
- High school: Taylorsville (Taylorsville, Utah)
- College: Snow (2022); Utah (2023–2025)
- NFL draft: 2026: 7th round, 256th overall pick

Career history
- Denver Broncos (2026–present)

Awards and highlights
- Third-team All-Big 12 (2025)
- Stats at Pro Football Reference

Dallen Bentley (born December 31, 2000) is an American professional football tight end for the Denver Broncos of the National Football League (NFL). He played college football for the Snow Badgers and Utah Utes. Bentley was selected by the Broncos in the seventh round of the 2026 NFL draft.

== Early life ==
Bentley was born on December 31, 2000, in Taylorsville, Utah. Bentley attended Taylorsville High School, and committed to play college football for Snow College. On his only career high school football reception, he broke both his tibia and fibula.

== College career ==
=== Snow College ===
In his lone season at Snow College in 2022, Bentley hauled in eight passes for 112 yards and two touchdowns, earning NJCAA All-America second-team honors. After the season, he entered the transfer portal.

=== Utah ===
Bentley transferred to play for the Utah Utes. In 2023, he caught one pass for five yards in six games played. In the 2024 season, Bentley appeared in 12 games with 7 starts, tallying two receptions for 15 yards. In week 1 of the 2025 season, Bentley hauled in five passes for 31 yards and a touchdown in a win over UCLA. In week 2, he recorded two catches for 35 yards and a touchdown in a win against Cal Poly. In week 5, Bentley totaled five receptions for 59 yards and a touchdown in a victory versus West Virginia. For his performance during the 2025 season, he was named third-team all-Big 12 and accepted an invite to participate in the 2026 East-West Shrine Bowl.

== Professional career ==
Pre-draft measurables
Height	Weight	Arm length	Hand span	Wingspan	40-yard dash	10-yard split	20-yard split	20-yard shuttle	Three-cone drill	Vertical jump	Broad jump	Bench press
6 ft 4 1/8 in (1.93 m)	253 lb (115 kg)	33 1/8 in (0.84 m)	9 1/4 in (0.23 m)	6 ft 7 3/8 in (2.02 m)	4.61 s	1.59 s	2.68 s	4.18 s	7.00 s	35.0 in (0.89 m)	9 ft 10 in (3.00 m)	24 reps
All values from NFL Combine/Pro Day

Bentley was selected by the Denver Broncos in the seventh round (256th overall) of the 2026 NFL draft. On May 7, 2026, he signed his four-year rookie contract. On August 30, 2026, he made the Broncos 53 man roster.
