= Jackson Bennee =

American football player

No. 23 – Utah Utes
- Position: Safety
- Class: Junior

Personal information
- Listed height: 6 ft 2 in (1.88 m)
- Listed weight: 190 lb (86 kg)

Career information
- High school: Olympus (Holladay, Utah)
- College: Utah (2024–present)
- Stats at ESPN

Jackson Bennee is an American college football safety for the Utah Utes.

== Early life ==
Bennee attended Olympus High School located in Holladay, Utah. Coming out of high school, he committed to play college football for the Utah Utes.

== College career ==
During his first collegiate season in 2024, he played in 12 games for the Utes. In week two of the 2025 season, Bennee intercepted a pass which he returned 46 yards for a touchdown in a win over Cal Poly. In week three, he notched an interception, in a win against Wyoming. In week four, Bennee recorded an interception in a third straight game.

== Personal life ==
Bennee's uncle is former Utah and NBA basketball player, Danny Vranes.
