= Ficklin–Crawford Cottage =

Historic house in Virginia, United States

- U.S. National Register of Historic Places
- Virginia Landmarks Register
- Location within Virginia Location within the United States
- Location: 1200 Carlton Ave., Charlottesville, Virginia
- Coordinates: 38°1′23″N 78°28′19″W
- Area: Less than 1 acre (0.40 ha)
- Architectural style: Gothic Revival
- MPS: Charlottesville MRA
- NRHP reference No.: 82001804
- VLR No.: 104-0386

Significant dates
- Added to NRHP: October 21, 1982
- Designated VLR: October 20, 1981

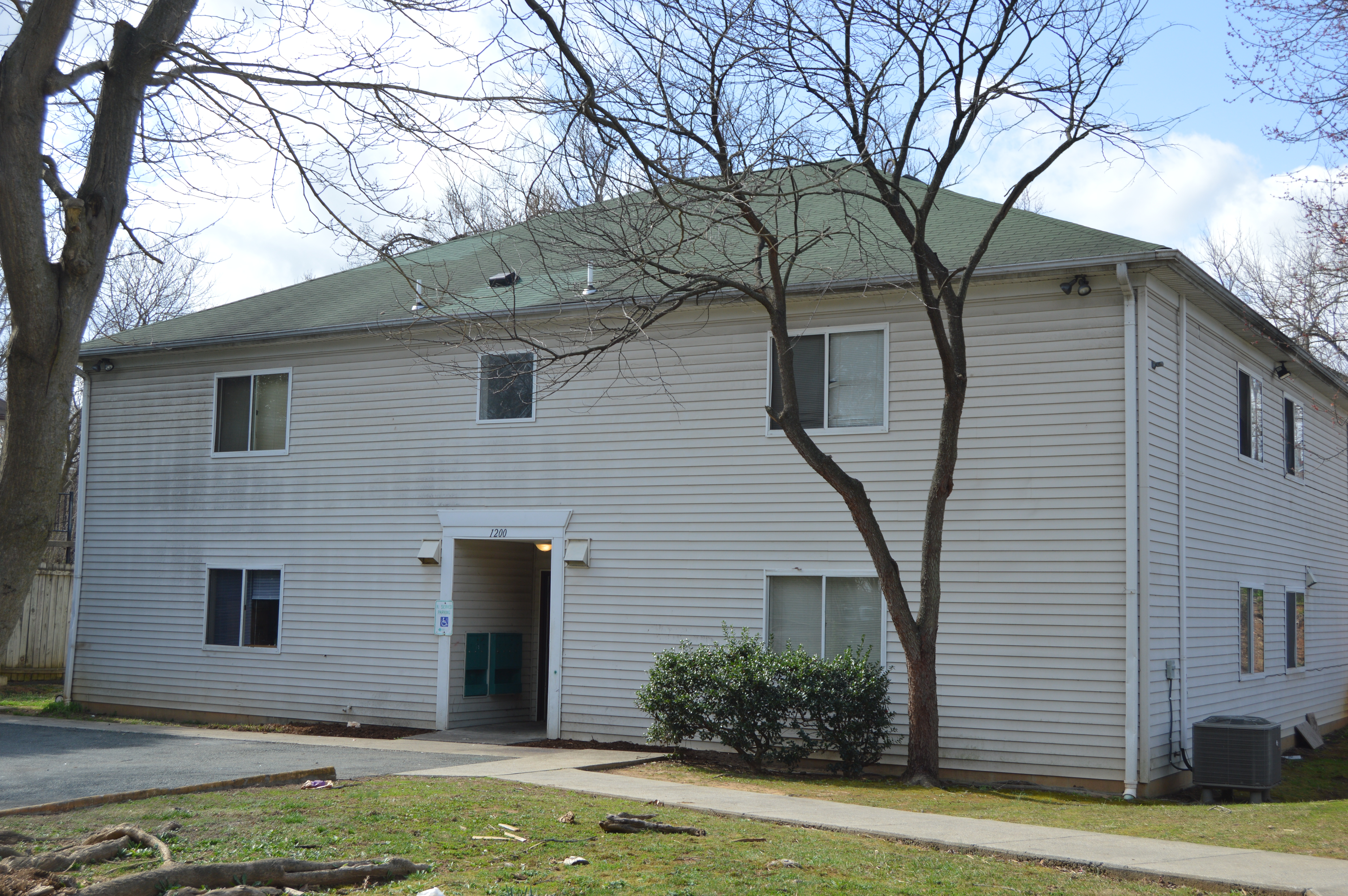
Ficklin-Crawford Cottage site.jpg

The Ficklin–Crawford Cottage was a historic house located in Charlottesville, Virginia. It was built sometime between 1865 and 1886, and was a 1 1/2-story, three-bay, frame dwelling with Gothic Revival style decorative details. It had a steep bellcast gable roof with deeply projecting eaves. It originally stood on the southwest corner of Belmont Avenue and Castalia Street, and moved to its final site in 1929.

The house suffered a fire in October 1981, and the owner's insurance deemed it a total loss. Despite the damage, it was listed on the National Register of Historic Places on October 21, 1982. However, on November 24 of the same year, the city government granted the owner's request for permission to demolish the structure.
