= Nate Johnson (quarterback) =

American football player (born 2004)

No. 3 – Utah Utes
- Position: Wide receiver
- Class: Redshirt Senior

Personal information
- Born: January 11, 2004 (age 22)
- Listed height: 6 ft 1 in (1.85 m)
- Listed weight: 200 lb (91 kg)

Career information
- High school: Clovis (Clovis, California)
- College: Utah (2022–2023); Vanderbilt (2024); Utah (2025–present)
- Stats at ESPN

Nate Johnson (born January 11, 2004) is an American college football wide receiver for the Utah Utes. He previously played for the Vanderbilt Commodores.

== Early life ==
Coming out of Clovis High School, Johnson was rated as a four-star recruit and committed to play college football for the Utah Utes.

== College career ==
=== Utah (first stint) ===
Johnson finished his first career season with the Utes in 2022 with five carries for 51 yards and two touchdowns, while also throwing for a touchdown in a limited three games. In the 2023 season opener, he attempted four passes and rushed for 45 yards in a win over Florida. In week 2, Johnson replaced starter Bryson Barnes and led the Utes on a game-winning drive completing six of seven pass attempts for 82 yards and rushed for 32 yards and a touchdown in a win over Baylor. In week 3, he got his first career start as he completed 13 of 21 passes for 193 yards and rushed for 71 yards and a touchdown in a win over Weber State. In week 10 versus Arizona State, Johnson rushed for a 59-yard touchdown in a victory. In 2023 he passed for 499 yards and three touchdowns and rushed for 235 yards and four touchdowns. After the season, Johnson entered the NCAA transfer portal.

=== Vanderbilt ===
On December 17, 2023, Johnson announced that he was transferring to Vanderbilt.

On December 4, 2024, Johnson announced that he would enter the transfer portal for the second time.

=== Utah (second stint) ===
On December 31 2024, Johnson announced his return to Utah.

=== Statistics ===
Season	Team	Games			Passing								Rushing				Receiving			
Season	Team	GP	GS	Record (Note: Accounts for only GS as a QB. In 2024, Johnson started one game at WR.)	Cmp	Att	Pct	Yds	Avg	TD	Int	Rtg	Att	Yds	Avg	TD	Rec	Yds	Avg	TD
2022	Utah	4	0	—	1	1	100.0	16	16.0	1	0	564.4	5	51	10.2	2	1	5	5.0	0
2023	Utah	8	3	2−1	39	72	54.2	499	6.9	3	0	126.1	59	235	4.0	4	0	0	0.0	0
2024	Vanderbilt	10	1	—	1	3	33.3	12	4.0	0	0	66.9	11	114	10.4	1	1	1	1.0	0
2025	Utah	8	0	—	0	0	0.0	0	0.0	0	0	0.0	24	225	9.4	1	1	16	16.0	0
Career		30	4	2−1	41	76	53.9	527	6.9	4	0	129.6	99	625	6.3	8	3	22	7.3	0
