= Micah Simon =

American college football coach

Current position
- Title: Wide receivers coach
- Team: Michigan
- Conference: Big Ten

Biographical details
- Born: May 28, 1997 (age 29); Dallas, Texas, U.S.
- Education: Brigham Young University

Playing career
- 2015–2019: BYU
- 2021: Carolina Panthers (Note: Offseason and/or practice squad member only)
- 2022: BC Lions (Note: Offseason and/or practice squad member only)
- Position: Wide receiver

Coaching career (HC unless noted)
- 2022: Syracuse (OA)
- 2023: Northern Colorado (WR)
- 2024: New Mexico (WR)
- 2025: Utah (WR)
- 2026–present: Michigan (WR)

Micah Simon (born May 28, 1997) is an American college football coach and former wide receiver, currently the wide receivers coach at the University of Michigan. He previously served as wide receivers coach at the University of Utah, University of New Mexico, and University of Northern Colorado, and as an offensive analyst at Syracuse University. Simon played college football at Brigham Young University (BYU) and signed with the Carolina Panthers as an undrafted free agent in 2021.

== Early life and high school ==
Simon attended Bishop Dunne Catholic School in Dallas, Texas, where he was a four-year, three-sport letterman in football, basketball, and track and field. As a quarterback, he led Bishop Dunne to the TAPPS Division I state championship in 2014, the school's first state title in 24 years.

== Playing career ==
=== Collegiate ===
Simon played college football as a wide receiver at Brigham Young University from 2015 to 2019. During his college career, he recorded 90 receptions for 1,109 yards. Simon graduated BYU with a Bachelor of Science in exercise science.

=== Professional ===
Following his college career, Simon entered the 2021 NFL draft, though signed as an undrafted free agent with the Carolina Panthers. He attracted attention from professional scouts with a reported 4.4-second 40-yard dash time. He attended training camp and preseason with the Panthers but was released before the regular season.

In 2022, Simon signed with the BC Lions of the Canadian Football League but did not make the final roster.

== Coaching career ==
=== Syracuse (2022) ===
Simon began his coaching career as an offensive analyst on the Syracuse Orange football staff in 2022, working under quarterbacks coach Jason Beck and with the wide receivers.

=== Northern Colorado (2023) ===
In 2023, Simon received his first position coaching opportunity, joining Northern Colorado as wide receivers coach.

=== New Mexico (2024) ===
In 2024, Simon joined head coach Bronco Mendenhall's staff at the University of New Mexico as wide receivers coach, as well as rejoining with offensive coordinator Jason Beck.

=== Utah (2025) ===
In January 2025, Simon was hired as wide receivers coach at the University of Utah by Kyle Whittingham, following offensive coordinator Beck from New Mexico. In 2025, Simon was named to the 247Sports' "30 Under 30" list, recognizing the best coaches in college football under 30 years old.

=== Michigan (2026–present) ===
On January 1, 2026, Simon was hired as wide receivers coach at the University of Michigan. Simon followed Beck once more, marking the fourth team the two worked together under, after head coach Whittingham left from Utah to Michigan and both joined him.

During the 2026 offseason, Simon joined the Green Bay Packers' offensive staff as part of the NFL's Bill Walsh Diversity Coaching Fellowship.
