= Byrd Ficklin =

American football player (born 2006)

No. 15 – Utah Utes
- Position: Quarterback
- Class: Sophomore

Personal information
- Born: September 22, 2006 (age 20)
- Listed height: 6 ft 1 in (1.85 m)
- Listed weight: 200 lb (91 kg)

Career information
- High school: Muskogee (Muskogee, Oklahoma)
- College: Utah (2025–present)
- Stats at ESPN

Jamarian "Byrd" Ficklin (born September 22, 2006) is an American college football quarterback for the Utah Utes.

== Early life ==
Ficklin attended Muskogee High School in Muskogee, Oklahoma. As a junior, he threw for 3,249 yards and 32 touchdowns while also rushing for 947 yards and 20 touchdowns, leading Muskogee to a state championship. As a senior, Ficklin threw for 2,218 yards and 28 touchdowns. A three-star recruit, he committed to play college football at the University of Utah.

== College career ==
Ficklin entered his true freshman season competing with Isaac Wilson for the Utes' second-string quarterback position. Against Cal Poly, he ran for 55 yards and two touchdowns in the win. Following an injury to starting quarterback Devon Dampier, Ficklin was named the team's starting quarterback against Colorado. In his first career start, he threw for 140 yards and two touchdowns while also rushing for 151 yards and a touchdown in a 53–7 rout.

=== Statistics ===
Season	Team	Games			Passing								Rushing			
Season	Team	GP	GS	Record	Comp	Att	Pct	Yards	Avg	TD	Int	Rate	Att	Yards	Avg	TD
2025	Utah	12	1	1–0	21	35	60.0	301	8.6	3	0	160.5	61	513	8.4	10
2026	Utah	1	0	0–0	4	8	50.0	93	11.6	2	0	230.2	8	70	8.8	0
Career		13	1	1−0	25	43	58.1	394	9.2	5	0	173.5	69	583	8.4	10
