= 2025 Northern Arizona Lumberjacks football team =

American college football season

2025 Northern Arizona Lumberjacks football
- Conference: Big Sky Conference
- Record: 7–5 (4–4 Big Sky)
- Head coach: Brian Wright (2nd season)
- Offensive coordinator: Bryan Larson (2nd season)
- Offensive scheme: Multiple
- Defensive coordinator: Adam Clark (2nd season)
- Base defense: 3–3–5
- Home stadium: Walkup Skydome

2025 Big Sky Conference football standings
	Conf.			Overall
Team	W		L	W		L
No. 1 Montana State $^	8	–	0	14	–	2
No. 3 Montana ^	7	–	1	13	–	2
No. 8 UC Davis ^	6	–	2	9	–	4
Sacramento State	5	–	3	7	–	5
Idaho State	5	–	3	6	–	6
Northern Arizona	4	–	4	7	–	5
Eastern Washington	4	–	4	5	–	7
Cal Poly	2	–	6	4	–	8
Idaho	2	–	6	4	–	8
Northern Colorado	2	–	6	4	–	8
Weber State	2	–	6	4	–	8
Portland State	1	–	7	1	–	11
$ – Conference champion; ^ – FCS playoff participant; Rankings from STATS Poll

The 2025 Northern Arizona Lumberjacks football team represented Northern Arizona University as a member of the Big Sky Conference during the 2025 NCAA Division I FCS football season. The Lumberjacks were led by second-year head coach Brian Wright and played at Walkup Skydome in Flagstaff, Arizona.

== Schedule ==
Date	Time	Opponent	Rank	Site	TV	Result	Attendance
August 30	7:00 p.m.	at No. 11 (FBS) Arizona State*	No. 19	Mountain America Stadium; Tempe, AZ	ESPN+	L 19–38	56,759
September 6	2:00 p.m.	Utah Tech*	No. 19	Walkup Skydome; Flagstaff, AZ	ESPN+	W 38–31	9,611
September 13	5:30 p.m.	at Southern Utah*	No. 18	Eccles Coliseum; Cedar City, UT (Grand Canyon Trophy Game)	ESPN+	W 52–49	3,084
September 20	2:00 p.m.	No. 19 Incarnate Word*	No. 17	Walkup Skydome; Flagstaff, AZ	ESPN+	W 31–23	10,007
September 27	2:00 p.m.	at Portland State	No. 15	Hillsboro Stadium; Hillsboro, OR	ESPN+	W 31–17	1,542
October 4	2:00 p.m.	No. 5 Montana State	No. 13	Walkup Skydome; Flagstaff, AZ	ESPN+	L 10–34	7,837
October 11	4:00 p.m.	at No. 6 UC Davis	No. 14	UC Davis Health Stadium; Davis, CA	ESPN+	L 24–45	9,937
October 25	3:00 p.m.	at Idaho State	No. 20	ICCU Dome; Pocatello, ID	ESPN+	W 31–18	9,861
October 31	7:30 p.m.	Idaho	No. 19	Walkup Skydome; Flagstaff, AZ	ESPN2	L 32–35 ^{OT}	5,112
November 8	4:00 p.m.	Northern Colorado^{†}		Walkup Skydome; Flagstaff, AZ	ESPN+	W 49–10	8,010
November 15	2:00 p.m.	Cal Poly	No. 24	Walkup Skydome; Flagstaff, AZ	ESPN+	W 35–27	7,472
November 22	1:00 p.m.	at Weber State	No. 23	Stewart Stadium; Ogden, UT (Red Rock Rivalry)	ESPN+	L 28–48	3,149
*Non-conference game; ^{†}Homecoming; Rankings from STATS Poll released prior to the game; All times are in Mountain time

== Game summaries ==
=== at No. 11 (FBS) Arizona State ===
No. 19 Northern Arizona Lumberjacks (0–0) at No. 11 (FBS) Arizona State Sun Devils (0–0) – Game summary

Quarter	1	2	3	4	Total
No. 19 Lumberjacks	0	6	7	6	19
No. 11 (FBS) Sun Devils	14	3	14	7	38

at Mountain America Stadium • Tempe, Arizona

- Date: August 30
- Game time: 7:00 p.m.
- Game weather: Sunny • Temperature: 100 °F (38 °C) • Wind: W 10 mph
- Game attendance: 56,759
- Referee: Cravonne Barrett
- TV announcers (ESPN+): Roxy Bernstein (play-by-play), Michael Bumpus (analyst), and Tori Petry (sideline)

Game information

First quarter

- ASU – Raleek Brown 6-yard run (Jesus Gomez kick), 10:42. Sun Devils 7–0. Drive: 5 plays, 49 yards, 2:44.
- ASU – Jordyn Tyson 19-yard pass from Sam Leavitt (Jesus Gomez kick), 5:08. Sun Devils 14–0. Drive: 7 plays, 89 yards, 3:24.

Second quarter

- NAU – Samuel Hunsaker 31-yard field goal, 14:14. Sun Devils 14–3. Drive: 5 plays, 14 yards, 2:06.
- ASU – Jesus Gomez 36-yard field goal, 1:55. Sun Devils 17–3. Drive: 9 plays, 47 yards, 5:25.
- NAU – Samuel Hunsaker 46-yard field goal, 0:15. Sun Devils 17–6. Drive: 10 plays, 53 yards, 1:33.

Third quarter

- ASU – Sam Leavitt 52-yard run (Jesus Gomez kick), 12:24. Sun Devils 24–6. Drive: 5 plays, 76 yards, 2:30.
- NAU – Nason Coleman 3-yard pass from Ty Pennington (Samuel Hunsaker kick), 8:14. Sun Devils 24–13. Drive: 9 plays, 75 yards, 4:10.
- ASU – Sam Leavitt 18-yard run (Jesus Gomez kick), 0:11. Sun Devils 31–13. Drive: 9 plays, 70 yards, 3:04.

Fourth quarter

- ASU – Jordyn Tyson 16-yard pass from Sam Leavitt (Jesus Gomez kick), 2:42. Sun Devils 38–13. Drive: 3 plays, 35 yards, 0:56.
- NAU – Kenveon Stone 1-yard run (run failed), 0:20. Sun Devils 38–19. Drive: 8 plays, 80 yards, 2:18.

Statistics	NAU	ASU
First downs	20	21
Plays–yards	55–331	60–460
Rushes–yards	29–89	21–203
Passing yards	242	257
Passing: comp–att–int	26–42–1	25–39–1
Turnovers	1	1
Time of possession	31:34	28:26

Team	Category	Player	Statistics
Northern Arizona	Passing	Ty Pennington	22/35, 204 yards, TD
Northern Arizona	Rushing	Kenveon Stone	3 carries, 35 yards, TD
Northern Arizona	Receiving	Kolbe Katsis	6 receptions, 76 yards
Arizona State	Passing	Sam Leavitt	25/39, 257 yards, 2 TD, INT
Arizona State	Rushing	Sam Leavitt	7 carries, 73 yards, 2 TD
Arizona State	Receiving	Jordyn Tyson	12 receptions, 141 yards, 2 TD

=== Utah Tech ===
Utah Tech Trailblazers (0–1) at No. 19 Northern Arizona Lumberjacks (0–1) – Game summary

Quarter	1	2	3	4	Total
Trailblazers	7	3	7	14	31
No. 19 Lumberjacks	14	17	0	7	38

at Walkup Skydome • Flagstaff, AZ

- Date: September 6
- Game time: 2:00 p.m.
- Game weather: none (played indoors)
- Game attendance: 9,611
- Referee: Jeff Rink
- TV announcers (ESPN+): Mitch Strohman (play-by-play), Kevin Stephens (analyst) and Adriana Sparks (sideline)

Game information

First quarter

- UTU – Daniel Thomason 9-yard pass from Bronson Barben (Ilya Uvaydov kick), 11:21. Trailblazers 7–0. Drive: 2 plays, 11 yards, 0:50.
- NAU – Seth Cromwell 2-yard run (Samuel Hunsaker kick), 5:26. Tied 7–7. Drive: 11 plays, 75 yards, 5:55.
- NAU – Ty Pennington 12-yard run (Samuel Hunsaker kick), 0:58. Lumberjacks 14–7. Drive: 4 plays, 54 yards, 2:22.

Second quarter

- NAU – Samuel Hunsaker 40-yard field goal, 9:45. Lumberjacks 17–7. Drive: 10 plays, 44 yards, 5:15.
- NAU – Seth Cromwell 3-yard run (Samuel Hunsaker kick), 7:13. Lumberjacks 24–7. Drive: 2 plays, 5 yards, 0:50.
- UTU – Ilya Uvaydov 39-yard field goal, 2:23. Lumberjacks 24–10. Drive: 10 plays, 46 yards, 4:50.
- NAU – Kolbe Katsis 49-yard pass from Ty Pennington (Samuel Hunsaker kick), 0:59. Lumberjacks 31–10. Drive: 6 plays, 75 yards, 1:24.

Third quarter

- UTU – Reggie Graff 31-yard run (Ilya Uvaydov kick), 5:54. Lumberjacks 31–17. Drive: 7 plays, 59 yards, 3:46.

Fourth quarter

- NAU – Darvon Hubbard 8-yard run (Samuel Hunsaker kick), 14:56. Lumberjacks 38–17. Drive: 8 plays, 79 yards, 3:09.
- UTU – Reggie Graff 8-yard run (Ilya Uvaydov kick), 9:02. Lumberjacks 38–24. Drive: 12 plays, 75 yards, 5:54.
- UTU – Asa Chatman 17-yard run (Ilya Uvaydov kick), 4:29. Lumberjacks 38–31. Drive: 7 plays, 53 yards, 2:27.

Statistics	UTU	NAU
First downs	20	20
Plays–yards	62–294	69–391
Rushes–yards	31–158	41–162
Passing yards	136	229
Passing: Comp–Att–Int	15–31–3	21–28–1
Turnovers	3	1
Time of possession	26:52	33:08

Team	Category	Player	Statistics
Utah Tech	Passing	Reggie Graff	12/24, 75 yards, INT
Utah Tech	Rushing	Reggie Graff	10 carries, 74 yards, 2 TD
Utah Tech	Receiving	Kaden Eggett	3 receptions, 59 yards
Northern Arizona	Passing	Ty Pennington	21/28, 229 yards, TD, INT
Northern Arizona	Rushing	Seth Cromwell	15 carries, 67 yards, 2 TD
Northern Arizona	Receiving	Kolbe Katsis	3 receptions, 82 yards, TD

=== at Southern Utah (Grand Canyon Trophy) ===
No. 18 Northern Arizona Lumberjacks (1–1) at Southern Utah Thunderbirds (1–1) – Game summary

Quarter	1	2	3	4	Total
No. 18 Lumberjacks	7	7	28	10	52
Thunderbirds	7	7	14	21	49

at Eccles Coliseum • Cedar City, UT

- Date: September 13
- Game time: 5:30 p.m. MDT
- Game attendance: 3,084
- Referee: Matthew Jones
- TV announcers (ESPN+): Spencer McLaughlin (play-by-play), Dallin Richards (analyst) and Kendall McGuire (sideline)

Game information

First quarter

- NAU – Kolbe Katsis 12-yard pass from Ty Pennington (Samuel Hunsaker kick), 11:58. Lumberjacks 7–0. Drive: 6 plays, 75 yards, 3:02.
- SUU – Joshua Dye 15-yard run (Jayden Rogers kick), 7:37. Tied 7–7. Drive: 10 plays, 75 yards, 4:21.

Second quarter

- SUU – Braedon Wissler 1-yard run (Jayden Rogers kick), 7:23. Thunderbirds 14–7. Drive: 17 plays, 77 yards, 8:22.
- NAU – Seth Cromwell 1-yard run (Samuel Hunsaker kick), 4:31. Tied 14–14. Drive: 7 plays, 75 yards, 2:52.

Third quarter

- NAU – Ty Pennington 4-yard run (Samuel Hunsaker kick), 12:56. Lumberjacks 21–14. Drive: 4 plays, 52 yards, 2:04.
- NAU – Jeter Purdy 22-yard pass from Ty Pennington (Samuel Hunsaker kick), 9:44. Lumberjacks 28–14. Drive: 4 plays, 30 yards, 1:26.
- SUU – Joshua Dye 1-yard run (Jayden Rogers kick), 5:56. Lumberjacks 28–21. Drive: 8 plays, 40 yards, 3:35.
- NAU – Kolbe Katsis 88-yard pass from Ty Pennington (Samuel Hunsaker kick), 5:41. Lumberjacks 35–21. Drive: 1 play, 88 yards, 0:12.
- SUU – Ran Sawyer 95-yard kickoff return (Jayden Rogers kick), 5:27. Lumberjacks 35–28.
- NAU – Quran Gossett 3-yard run (Samuel Hunsaker kick), 0:27. Lumberjacks 42–28. Drive: 9 plays, 75 yards, 5:00.

Fourth quarter

- SUU – Joshua Dye 59-yard run (Jayden Rogers kick), 13:27. Lumberjacks 42–35. Drive: 6 plays, 69 yards, 1:56.
- SUU – Shane Carr 42-yard pass from Bronson Barron (Jayden Rogers kick), 9:16. Tied 42–42. Drive: 4 plays, 65 yards, 1:42.
- SUU – Joshua Dye 4-yard run (Jayden Rogers kick), 4:31. Thunderbirds 49–42. Drive: 5 plays, 73 yards, 2:16.
- NAU – Seth Cromwell 5-yard run (Ty Pennington–Jayson Raines pass), 0:29. Lumberjacks 50–49. Drive: 13 plays, 79 yards, 3:56.
- NAU – Team safety, 0:13. Lumberjacks 52–49.

Statistics	NAU	SUU
First downs	23	26
Plays–yards	69–508	73–447
Rushes–yards	38–142	39–178
Passing yards	366	269
Passing: Comp–Att–Int	20–31–0	22–34–0
Turnovers	1	0
Time of possession	26:33	31:23

Team	Category	Player	Statistics
Northern Arizona	Passing	Ty Pennington	20/31, 366 yards, 3 TD
Northern Arizona	Rushing	Seth Cromwell	12 carries, 87 yards, 2 TD
Northern Arizona	Receiving	Kolbe Katsis	6 receptions, 135 yards, 2 TD
Southern Utah	Passing	Bronson Barron	22/33, 269 yards, TD
Southern Utah	Rushing	Joshua Dye	25 carries, 171 yards, 4 TD
Southern Utah	Receiving	Shane Carr	3 receptions, 89 yards, TD

=== No. 19 Incarnate Word ===
No. 19 Incarnate Word Cardinals (1–2) at No. 17 Northern Arizona Lumberjacks (2–1) – Game summary

Quarter	1	2	3	4	Total
No. 19 Cardinals	0	10	6	7	23
No. 17 Lumberjacks	7	14	7	3	31

at Walkup Skydome • Flagstaff, AZ

- Date: September 20
- Game time: 2:00 p.m. MDT
- Game weather: Indoors
- Game attendance: 10,007
- Referee: Mike Bezner
- TV announcers (ESPN+): Mitch Strohman (play-by-play) and Kevin Stephens (analyst)

Game information

First quarter

- NAU – 6:19 Ethen Cluff 4-yard run, Samuel Hunsaker kick. NAU 7–0 Drive: 10 plays, 77 yards, 5:32

Second quarter

- UIW – 14:49 Will Faris 37-yard field goal. NAU 7–3 Drive: 8 plays, 68 yards, 2:00
- UIW – 9:34 Jameson Garcia 47-yard pass from EJ Colson, Will Faris kick. UIW 10–7 Drive: 7 plays, 75 yards, 3:34
- NAU – 7:17 Jayson Raines 33-yard pass from Ty Pennington, Samuel Hunsaker kick. NAU 14–10 Drive: 5 plays, 75 yards, 2:17
- NAU – 0:00 Myseth Currie 46-yard pass from Ty Pennington, Samuel Hunsaker kick. NAU 21–10 Drive: 7 plays, 60 yards, 0:56

Third quarter

- UIW – 3:24 Lontrell Turner 3-yard run, PAT failed. NAU 21–16 Drive: 11 plays, 80 yards, 6:56
- NAU – 1:17 Jeter Purdy 30-yard pass from Ty Pennington, Samuel Hunsaker kick. NAU 28–16 Drive: 5 plays, 78 yards, 2:01

Fourth quarter

- UIW – 11:02 Jameson Garcia 11-yard pass from EJ Colson, Will Faris kick. NAU 28–23 Drive: 10 plays, 77 yards, 5:32
- NAU – 5:13 Samuel Hunsaker 50-yard field goal. NAU 31–23 Drive: 11 plays, 43 yards, 5:49

Statistics	UIW	NAU
First downs	22	19
Plays–yards	66–436	63–402
Rushes–yards	28–144	29–116
Passing yards	292	286
Passing: Comp–Att–Int	30–38–0	17–34–0
Turnovers	0	0
Time of possession	31:43	28:17

Team	Category	Player	Statistics
Incarnate Word	Passing	EJ Colson	28/36, 292 yards, 2 TD
Incarnate Word	Rushing	EJ Colson	13 carries, 59 yards
Incarnate Word	Receiving	Jameson Garcia	9 receptions, 116 yards, 2 TD
Northern Arizona	Passing	Ty Pennington	17/34, 286 yards, 3 TD
Northern Arizona	Rushing	Seth Cromwell	16 carries, 63 yards
Northern Arizona	Receiving	Kolbe Katsis	4 receptions, 95 yards

=== at Portland State ===
No. 15 Northern Arizona Lumberjacks (3–1) at Portland State Vikings (0–4) – Game summary

Quarter	1	2	3	4	Total
No. 15 Lumberjacks	14	10	0	7	31
Vikings	7	3	7	0	17

at Hillsboro Stadium • Hillsboro, OR

- Date: September 27
- Game time: 2:00 p.m. PDT
- Game weather: Cloudy • Temperature: 72 °F (22 °C) • Wind: E at 3 miles per hour (4.8 km/h)
- Game attendance: 1,542
- Referee: Robert Quello
- TV announcers (ESPN+): Matt Richert (play-by-play) and Scott Hermo (analyst)

Game information

First quarter

- PRST – Eddy Schultz 10-yard pass from John-Keawe Sagapolutele (Mathias Uribe kick), 11:30. Vikings 7–0. Drive: 7 plays, 65 yards, 3:30.
- NAU – Seth Cromwell 1-yard run (Samuel Hunsaker kick), 7:29. Tied 7–7. Drive: 8 plays, 70 yards, 3:54.
- NAU – Kolbe Katsis 15-yard pass from Ty Pennington (Samuel Hunsaker kick), 1:12. Lumberjacks 14–7. Drive: 8 plays, 87 yards, 4:11.

Second quarter

- NAU – Samuel Hunsaker 28-yard field goal, 8:32. Lumberjacks 17–7. Drive: 9 plays, 85 yards, 3:47.
- PRST – Mathias Uribe 31-yard field goal, 3:22. Lumberjacks 17–10. Drive: 11 plays, 51 yards, 5:10.
- NAU – Quran Gossett 3-yard run (Samuel Hunsaker kick), 0:10. Lumberjacks 24–10. Drive: 10 plays, 83 yards, 3:06.

Third quarter

- PRST – Jordan Herron 57-yard punt return (Mathias Uribe kick), 7:17. Lumberjacks 24–17.

Fourth quarter

- NAU – Quran Gossett 29-yard run (Samuel Hunsaker kick), 12:54. Lumberjacks 31–17. Drive: 5 plays, 90 yards, 2:51.

Statistics	NAU	PRST
First downs	25	20
Plays–yards	65–515	63–325
Rushes–yards	41–253	26–123
Passing yards	262	202
Passing: Comp–Att–Int	15–24–0	19–37–0
Turnovers	0	0
Time of possession	30:26	29:34

Team	Category	Player	Statistics
Northern Arizona	Passing	Ty Pennington	15/24, 262 yards, TD
Northern Arizona	Rushing	Quran Gossett	16 carries, 112 yards, 2 TD
Northern Arizona	Receiving	Kolbe Katsis	4 receptions, 56 yards, TD
Portland State	Passing	John-Keawe Sagapolutele	18/36, 202 yards, TD
Portland State	Rushing	Delon Thompson	17 carries, 88 yards
Portland State	Receiving	Kristian Ingman	3 receptions, 73 yards

=== No. 5 Montana State ===
No. 5 Montana State Bobcats (3–2) at No. 13 Northern Arizona Lumberjacks (4–1) – Game summary

Quarter	1	2	3	4	Total
No. 4 Bobcats	0	20	7	7	34
No. 13 Lumberjacks	7	0	0	3	10

at Walkup Skydome • Flagstaff, AZ

- Date: October 4
- Game time: 2:00 p.m. PDT
- Game weather: None (played indoors)
- Game attendance: 7,837
- Referee: Gregg Wilson
- TV announcers (ESPN+): Ben Creighton (play-by-play), Ty Gregorak (analyst) and Grace Lawrence (sideline)

Game information

First quarter

- NAU – Seth Cromwell 2-yard run (Samuel Hunsaker kick), 1:32. Lumberjacks 7–0. Drive: 12 plays, 57 yards, 5:48.

Second quarter

- MTST – Taco Dowler 90-yard punt return (Myles Sansted kick), 7:40. Tied 7–7.
- MTST – Jabez Woods 79-yard pass from Justin Lamson (Myles Sansted kick), 6:01. Bobcats 14–7. Drive: 3 plays, 75 yards, 1:14.
- MTST – Julius Davis 13-yard run (kick failed), 0:59. Bobcats 20–7. Drive: 5 plays, 80 yards, 1:28.

Third quarter

- MTST – Rocky Lencioni 3-yard pass from Justin Lamson (Myles Sansted kick), 10:50. Bobcats 27–7. Drive: 9 plays, 75 yards, 4:10.

Fourth quarter

- MTST – Justin Lamson 19-yard run (Myles Sansted kick), 12:51. Bobcats 34–7. Drive: 3 plays, 39 yards, 1:17.
- NAU – Samuel Hunsaker 39-yard field goal, 5:11. Bobcats 34–10. Drive: 16 plays, 55 yards, 7:32.

Statistics	MTST	NAU
First downs	18	22
Plays–yards	52–417	78–296
Rushes–yards	32–196	31–86
Passing yards	221	210
Passing: Comp–Att–Int	14–20–0	28–47–1
Turnovers	0	1
Time of possession	24:27	35:33

Team	Category	Player	Statistics
Montana State	Passing	Justin Lamson	13/19, 213 yards, 2 TD
Montana State	Rushing	Julius Davis	10 carries, 73 yards, TD
Montana State	Receiving	Jabez Woods	3 receptions, 100 yards, TD
Northern Arizona	Passing	Ty Pennington	28/47, 210 yards, INT
Northern Arizona	Rushing	Seth Cromwell	10 carries, 40 yards, TD
Northern Arizona	Receiving	Quran Gossett	4 receptions, 45 yards

=== at No. 6 UC Davis ===
No. 14 Northern Arizona Lumberjacks (4–2) at No. 6 UC Davis Aggies (4–1) – Game summary

Quarter	1	2	3	4	Total
No. 14 Lumberjacks	7	0	10	7	24
No. 6 Aggies	3	7	14	21	45

at UC Davis Health Stadium • Davis, CA

- Date: October 11
- Game time: 4:00 p.m. MST
- Game attendance: 9,937
- Referee: Spencer Mumford
- TV: ESPN+

Game information

First quarter

- UCD – Hunter Ridley 42-yard field goal, 7:20. Aggies 3–0. Drive: 6 plays, 29 yards, 2:41.
- NAU – Kolbe Katsis 20-yard pass from Ty Pennington (Samuel Hunsaker kick), 0:00. Lumberjacks 7–3. Drive: 13 plays, 65 yards, 7:12.

Second quarter

- UCD – Samuel Gbatu Jr. 31-yard pass from Caden Pinnick (Hunter Ridley kick), 7:55. Aggies 10–7. Drive: 5 plays, 90 yards, 2:11.

Third quarter

- UCD – Jordan Fisher 59-yard run (Hunter Ridley kick), 14:15. Aggies 17–7. Drive: 2 plays, 65 yards, 0:45.
- NAU – Quran Gossett 7-yard run (Samuel Hunsaker kick), 10:52. Aggies 17–14. Drive: 6 plays, 62 yards, 3:16.
- UCD – Carter Vargas 50-yard pass from Caden Pinnick (Hunter Ridley kick), 8:12. Aggies 24–14. Drive: 6 plays, 75 yards, 2:40.
- NAU – Samuel Hunsaker 32-yard field goal, 1:53. Aggies 24–17. Drive: 12 plays, 51 yards, 6:14.

Fourth quarter

- UCD – Samuel Gbatu. Jr 4-yard pass from Caden Pinick (Hunter Ridley kick), 11:53. Aggies 31–17. Drive: 13 plays, 75 yards, 5:00.
- NAU – Quran Gossett 4-yard run (Samuel Hunsaker kick), 10:44. Aggies 31–24. Drive: 4 plays, 48 yards, 1:00.
- UCD – Stacy Dobbins 10-yard pass from Caden Pinnick (Hunter Ridley kick), 6:53. Aggies 38–24. Drive: 6 plays, 47 yards, 3:20.
- UCD – Mitchell Dixon 7-yard pass from Caden Pinnick (Hunter Ridley kick), 1:55. Aggies 45–24. Drive: 10 plays, 55 yards, 4:03.

Statistics	NAU	UCD
First downs	21	22
Plays–yards	71–410	61–458
Rushes–yards	42–165	32–110
Passing yards	245	348
Passing: Comp–Att–Int	18–29–0	25–29–0
Turnovers	3	1
Time of possession	34:46	25:14

Team	Category	Player	Statistics
Northern Arizona	Passing	Ty Pennington	18/28, 245 yards, TD
Northern Arizona	Rushing	Quran Gossett	8 carries, 66 yards, 2 TD
Northern Arizona	Receiving	Isaiah Eastman	7 receptions, 135 yards
UC Davis	Passing	Caden Pinnick	25/29, 348 yards, 5 TD
UC Davis	Rushing	Jordan Fisher	14 carries, 104 yards, TD
UC Davis	Receiving	Samuel Gbatu Jr.	7 receptions, 114 yards, 2 TD

=== at Idaho State ===
No. 20 Northern Arizona Lumberjacks (4–3) at Idaho State Bengals (2–5) – Game summary

Quarter	1	2	3	4	Total
No. 20 Lumberjacks	7	14	0	10	31
Bengals	7	3	0	8	18

at ICCU Dome • Pocatello, ID

- Date: October 25
- Game time: 3:00 p.m. MST
- Game weather: None (played indoors)
- Game attendance: 9,861
- Referee: Robert Quello
- TV: ESPN+

Game information

First quarter

- IDST – Dason Brooks 6-yard run (Trajan Sinatra kick), 7:15. Bengals 7–0. Drive: 6 plays, 45 yards, 2:48.
- NAU – Seth Cromwell 8-yard run (Samuel Hunsaker kick), 4:19. Tied 7–7. Drive: 6 plays, 75 yards, 2:56.

Second quarter

- IDST – Trajan Sinatra 40-yard field goal, 10:59. Bengals 10–7. Drive: 7 plays, 20 yards, 2:32.
- NAU – Braden Kramer 14-yard pass from Ty Pennington (Samuel Hunsaker kick), 3:51. Lumberjacks 14–10. Drive: 14 plays, 75 yards, 7:08.
- NAU – Darvon Hubbard 4-yard run (Samuel Hunsaker kick), 1:14. Lumberjacks 21–10. Drive: 12 plays, 84 yards, 2:44.

Third quarter

- No scoring plays.

Fourth quarter

- NAU – Quran Gossett 3-yard run (Samuel Hunsaker kick), 11:23. Lumberjacks 28–10. Drive: 16 plays, 70 yards, 6:53.
- IDST – Michael Shulikov 23-yard pass from Jordan Cooke (Jordan Cook–Jonah Burton pass), 8:52. Lumberjacks 28–18. Drive: 8 plays, 73 yards, 2:24.
- NAU – Samuel Hunsaker 41-yard field goal, 4:10. Lumberjacks 31–18. Drive: 11 plays, 21 yards, 4:41.

Statistics	NAU	IDST
First downs	23	23
Plays–yards	70–371	62–393
Rushes–yards	45–200	23–137
Passing yards	171	256
Passing: Comp–Att–Int	24–30–0	26–39–1
Turnovers	0	2
Time of possession	34:37	25:23

Team	Category	Player	Statistics
Northern Arizona	Passing	Ty Pennington	24/30, 171 yards, TD
Northern Arizona	Rushing	Darvon Hubbard	8 carries, 66 yards, TD
Northern Arizona	Receiving	Kolbe Katsis	8 receptions, 68 yards
Idaho State	Passing	Jordan Cooke	26/39, 256 yards, TD, INT
Idaho State	Rushing	Dason Brooks	11 carries, 108 yards, TD
Idaho State	Receiving	Tsion Nunnally	8 receptions, 71 yards

=== Idaho ===
Idaho Vandals (3–5) at No. 19 Northern Arizona Lumberjacks (5–3) – Game summary

Quarter	1	2	3	4	OT	Total
Vandals	0	19	7	3	6	35
No. 19 Lumberjacks	7	0	7	15	3	32

at Walkup Skydome • Flagstaff, AZ

- Date: October 31
- Game time: 7:30 PM MST
- Game weather: Indoor
- Game attendance: 5,112
- Referee: Robert Quello
- TV announcers (ESPN2): Courtney Lyle (play-by-play) and Rene Ingoglia (analyst)

Game information

First quarter

- NAU - Ryan Fontaine 20-yard punt return (Samuel Hunsaker kick), 1:59. Lumberjacks 7-0. Drive: 5 plays, 13 yards, 2:41.

Second quarter

- IDHO - Ryan Jezioro 3-yard pass from Joshua Wood (Owen Adams PAT blocked), 12:43. Lumberjacks 7-6. Drive: 8 plays, 75 yards, 4:16.
- IDHO - Elisha Cummings 25-yard pass from Joshua Wood (two-point pass conversion failed), 4:13. Vandals 12-7. Drive: 5 plays, 73 yards, 2:48.
- IDHO - Elisha Cummings 22-yard run (Owen Adams kick), 0:28. Vandals 19-7. Drive: 6 plays, 48 yards, 2:09.

Third quarter

- IDHO - Cruz Hepburn 63-yard fumble recovery (Owen Adams kick), 9:04. Vandals 26-7. Drive: 5 plays, -27 yards, 1:57.
- NAU - Quran Gossett 1-yard run (Samuel Hunsaker kick), 5:06. Vandals 26-14. Drive: 9 plays, 75 yards, 3:58.

Fourth quarter

- NAU - Kolbe Katsis 57-yard pass from Ty Pennington (Samuel Hunsaker kick), 13:56. Vandals 26-21. Drive: 5 plays, 80 yards, 1:56.
- NAU - Kolbe Katsis 28-yard run (Ty Pennington pass to Joey Stout for two-point conversion), 8:28. Lumberjacks 29-26. Drive: 7 plays, 85 yards, 3:27.
- IDHO - Owen Adams 42-yard field goal, 0:00. Tied 29-29. Drive: 13 plays, 51 yards, 4:06.

Overtime

- NAU - Samuel Hunsaker 38-yard field goal. Lumberjacks 32-29. Drive: 9 plays, 4 yards.
- IDHO - Hayden Kincheloe 1-yard run. Vandals 35-32. Drive: 2 plays, 25 yards.

Statistics	IDHO	NAU
First downs	21	19
Plays–yards	67–393	70–413
Rushes–yards	36–213	36–146
Passing yards	180	267
Passing: Comp–Att–Int	15–31–1	23–34–0
Turnovers	1	1
Time of possession	29:24	30:36

Team	Category	Player	Statistics
Idaho	Passing	Joshua Wood	15/31, 180 yards, 2 TD, INT
Idaho	Rushing	Elisha Cummings	12 carries, 106 yards, TD
Idaho	Receiving	Elisha Cummings	5 receptions, 78 yards, TD
Northern Arizona	Passing	Ty Pennington	23/34, 267 yards, TD
Northern Arizona	Rushing	Seth Cromwell	18 carries, 116 yards
Northern Arizona	Receiving	Kolbe Katsis	5 receptions, 98 yards, TD

=== Northern Colorado ===
Northern Colorado Bears (3–6) at Northern Arizona Lumberjacks (5–4) – Game summary

Quarter	1	2	3	4	Total
Bears	0	10	0	0	10
Lumberjacks	14	14	14	7	49

at Walkup Skydome • Flagstaff, AZ

- Date: November 8
- Game time: 4:00 p.m. MST
- Game weather: none (played indoors)
- Game attendance: 8,010
- Referee: Jeff Rink
- TV: ESPN+

Game information

First quarter

- NAU – Jayson Raines 14-yard pass from Ty Pennington (Samuel Hunsaker kick), 8:03. Lumberjacks 7–0. Drive: 9 plays, 72 yards, 5:24.
- NAU – Darvon Hubbard 4-yard run (Samuel Hunsaker kick), 3:41. Lumberjacks 14–0. Drive: 6 plays, 75 yards, 2:56.

Second quarter

- UNCO – Jacob Willig 32-yard field goal, 13:01. Lumberjacks 14–3. Drive: 11 plays, 60 yards, 5:40.
- NAU – Quran Gossett 7-yard run (Samuel Hunsaker kick), 2:00. Lumberjacks 21–3. Drive: 7 plays, 47 yards, 4:05.
- UNCO – Brandon Johnson 3-yard run (Jacob Willig kick), 0:23. Lumberjacks 21–10. Drive: 10 plays, 75 yards, 1:37.
- NAU – Kolbe Katsis 100-yard kickoff return (Samuel Hunsaker kick), 0:10. Lumberjacks 28–10.

Third quarter

- NAU – Seth Cromwell 2-yard run (Samuel Hunsaker kick), 13:00. Lumberjacks 35–10. Drive: 4 plays, 75 yards, 2:00.
- NAU – Seth Cromwell 7-yard run (Samuel Hunsaker kick), 1:04. Lumberjacks 42–10. Drive: 7 plays, 80 yards, 3:01.

Fourth quarter

- NAU – Ryan Fontaine 7-yard run (Samuel Hunsaker kick), 5:15. Lumberjacks 49–10. Drive: 10 plays, 59 yards, 6:17.

Statistics	UNCO	NAU
First downs	16	25
Plays–yards	63–285	60–481
Rushes–yards	29–105	35–234
Passing yards	180	247
Passing: Comp–Att–Int	20–34–1	22–25–0
Turnovers	1	0
Time of possession	26:10	33:50

Team	Category	Player	Statistics
Northern Colorado	Passing	Eric Gibson Jr.	17/28, 151 yards
Northern Colorado	Rushing	Brandon Johnson	7 carries, 36 yards, TD
Northern Colorado	Receiving	Brayden Munroe	4 receptions, 64 yards
Northern Arizona	Passing	Ty Pennington	19/22, 225 yards, TD
Northern Arizona	Rushing	Kolbe Katsis	2 carries, 51 yards
Northern Arizona	Receiving	Isaiah Eastman	6 receptions, 84 yards

=== Cal Poly ===
Cal Poly Mustangs (3–7) at No. 24 Northern Arizona Lumberjacks (6–4) – Game summary

Quarter	1	2	3	4	Total
Mustangs	7	10	3	7	27
No. 24 Lumberjacks	7	15	10	3	35

at Walkup Skydome • Flagstaff, AZ

- Date: November 15
- Game time: 2:00 p.m. MST
- Game weather: none (played indoors)
- Game attendance: 7,472
- Referee: Kelly Holman
- TV: ESPN+

Game information

First quarter

- NAU – Kolbe Katsis 6-yard pass from Ty Pennington (Samuel Hunsaker kick), 8:25. Lumberjacks 7–0. Drive: 8 plays, 72 yards, 4:33.
- CP – Fidel Tau Pitts 20-yard pass from Ty Dieffenbach (Noah Serna kick), 2:40. Tied 7–7. Drive: 11 plays, 75 yards, 5:45.

Second quarter

- NAU – Darvon Hubbard 2-yard pass from Ty Pennington (Samuel Hunsaker kick), 1:14. Lumberjacks 14–7. Drive: 6 plays, 42 yards, 2:39.
- CP – Gianluca Dimauro 51-yard field goal, 0:40. Lumberjacks 14–10. Drive: 4 plays, 0 yards, 0:22.
- NAU – Kolbe Katsis 75-yard pass from Ty Pennington (Ty Pennington–Hayden Daugherty pass), 0:24. Lumberjacks 22–10. Drive: 1 play, 75 yards, 0:16.
- CP – Fidel Tau Pitts 57-yard pass from Anthony Grigsby Jr. (Noah Serna kick), 0:00. Lumberjacks 22–17. Drive: 3 plays, 68 yards, 0:16.

Third quarter

- NAU – Kolbe Katsis 38-yard pass from Ty Pennington (Samuel Hunsaker kick), 12:53. Lumberjacks 29–17. Drive: 4 plays, 75 yards, 2:07.
- CP – Gianluca Dimauro 39-yard field goal, 8:19. Lumberjacks 29–20. Drive: 9 plays, 27 yards, 2:49.
- NAU – Samuel Hunsaker 42-yard field goal, 2:33. Lumberjacks 32–20. Drive: 4 plays, 4 yards, 1:26.

Fourth quarter

- CP – Anthony Grigsby Jr. 2-yard run (Noah Serna kick), 7:44. Lumberjacks 32–27. Drive: 7 plays, 60 yards, 2:32.
- NAU – Samuel Hunsaker 37-yard field goal, 5:02. Lumberjacks 35–27. Drive: 6 plays, 56 yards, 2:42.

Statistics	CP	NAU
First downs	17	23
Plays–yards	68–356	63–495
Rushes–yards	32–86	34–139
Passing yards	270	356
Passing: Comp–Att–Int	15–36–3	22–29–1
Turnovers	3	1
Time of possession	26:53	33:07

Team	Category	Player	Statistics
Cal Poly	Passing	Anthony Grigsby Jr.	5/12, 151 yards, TD, INT
Cal Poly	Rushing	Tyrei Washington	6 carries, 28 yards
Cal Poly	Receiving	Fidel Tau Pitts	4 receptions, 138 yards, 2 TD
Northern Arizona	Passing	Ty Pennington	22/29, 356 yards, 4 TD, INT
Northern Arizona	Rushing	Seth Cromwell	16 carries, 85 yards
Northern Arizona	Receiving	Kolbe Katsis	6 receptions, 148 yards, 3 TD

=== at Weber State ===
No. 23 Northern Arizona Lumberjacks (7–4) at Weber State Wildcats (3–8) – Game summary

Quarter	1	2	3	4	Total
No. 23 Lumberjacks	14	7	0	7	28
Wildcats	14	10	10	14	48

at Stewart Stadium • Ogden, UT

- Date: November 22
- Game time: 1:00 p.m. MST
- Game weather: Sunny • Temperature: 47 °F (8 °C) • Wind: NW at 3 miles per hour (4.8 km/h)
- Game attendance: 3,149
- Referee: Gregg Wilson
- TV: ESPN+

Game information

First quarter

- WEB – Colter May 24-yard run (Sloan Calder kick), 12:03. Wildcats 7–0. Drive: 6 plays, 75 yards, 2:57.
- NAU – Isaiah Eastman 10-yard run (Samuel Hunsaker kick), 9:57. Tied 7–7. Drive: 5 plays, 44 yards, 2:05.
- WEB – Spencer Ferguson 50-yard run (Sloan Calder kick), 4:50. Wildcats 14–7. Drive: 1 play, 50 yards, 0:10.
- NAU – Kolbe Katsis 74-yard pass from Ty Pennington (Samuel Hunsaker kick), 4:31. Tied 14–14. Drive: 1 play, 74 yards, 0:12.

Second quarter

- WEB – Spencer Ferguson 16-yard pass from Kingston Tisdell (Sloan Calder kick), 8:29. Wildcats 21–14. Drive: 7 plays, 58 yards, 3:18.
- WEB – Sloan Calder 27-yard field goal, 1:47. Wildcats 24–14. Drive: 9 plays, 57 yards, 4:13.
- NAU – Mikale Greer 42-yard interception return (Samuel Hunsaker kick), 0:34. Wildcats 24–21.

Third quarter

- WEB – Marvin Session 61-yard pass from Kingston Tisdell (Sloan Calder kick), 8:13. Wildcats 31–21. Drive: 3 plays, 61 yards, 1:36.
- WEB – Sloan Calder 26-yard field goal, 3:57. Wildcats 34–21. Drive: 8 plays, 21 yards, 3:19.

Fourth quarter

- WEB – Colter May 28-yard run (Sloan Calder kick), 10:58. Wildcats 41–21. Drive: 6 plays, 64 yards, 3:51.
- NAU – Isaiah Eastman 7-yard pass from Ty Pennington (Samuel Hunsaker kick), 7:00. Wildcats 41–28. Drive: 12 plays, 75 yards, 3:58.
- WEB – Bird Butler 8-yard run (Sloan Calder kick), 2:19. Wildcats 48–28. Drive: 2 plays, 5 yards, 0:16.

Statistics	NAU	WEB
First downs	12	19
Plays–yards	65–303	67–474
Rushes–yards	25–53	29–197
Passing yards	250	277
Passing: Comp–Att–Int	21–40–1	26–38–1
Turnovers	1	1
Time of possession	28:04	31:56

Team	Category	Player	Statistics
Northern Arizona	Passing	Ty Pennington	21/39, 250 yards, 2 TD, INT
Northern Arizona	Rushing	Ty Pennington	11 carries, 18 yards
Northern Arizona	Receiving	Kolbe Katsis	8 receptions, 135 yards, TD
Weber State	Passing	Kingston Tisdell	26/38, 277 yards, 2 TD, INT
Weber State	Rushing	Spencer Ferguson	11 carries, 102 yards, TD
Weber State	Receiving	Marvin Session	3 receptions, 84 yards, TD

== Ranking movements ==
Ranking movements Legend: ██ Increase in ranking ██ Decrease in ranking — = Not ranked RV = Received votes т = Tied with team above or below
	Week														
Poll	Pre	1	2	3	4	5	6	7	8	9	10	11	12	13	Final
STATS FCS	19	19	18	17	15	13	14	19	20	19	RV	24	23	RV	
Coaches	18	19	19	19	15т	13	16	21	22	21	RV	RV	RV	—	
