= 2024 Northern Arizona Lumberjacks football team =

American college football season

2024 Northern Arizona Lumberjacks football

NCAA Division I First Round, L 0–24 at Abilene Christian
- Conference: Big Sky Conference

Ranking
- STATS: No. 22
- FCS Coaches: No. 22
- Record: 8–5 (6–2 Big Sky)
- Head coach: Brian Wright (1st season)
- Co-offensive coordinator: Bryan Larson (1st season)
- Offensive scheme: Multiple
- Defensive coordinator: Adam Clark (1st season)
- Base defense: 3–3–5
- Home stadium: Walkup Skydome

2024 Big Sky Conference football standings
	Conf.			Overall
Team	W		L	W		L
No. 2 Montana State $^	8	–	0	15	–	1
No. 5 UC Davis ^	7	–	1	11	–	3
No. 7 Idaho ^	6	–	2	10	–	4
No. 22 Northern Arizona ^	6	–	2	8	–	5
No. 10 Montana ^	5	–	3	9	–	5
Idaho State	3	–	5	5	–	7
Eastern Washington	3	–	5	4	–	8
Weber State	3	–	5	4	–	8
Portland State	3	–	5	3	–	8
Cal Poly	2	–	6	3	–	8
Sacramento State	1	–	7	3	–	9
Northern Colorado	1	–	7	1	–	11
$ – Conference champion; ^ – FCS playoff participant; Rankings from STATS Poll

The 2024 Northern Arizona Lumberjacks football team represented Northern Arizona University as a member of the Big Sky Conference during the 2024 NCAA Division I FCS football season. The Lumberjacks were coached by first-year head coach Brian Wright and played at Walkup Skydome in Flagstaff, Arizona.

== Schedule ==
Date	Time	Opponent	Rank	Site	TV	Result	Attendance
August 31	1:00 p.m.	Lincoln (CA)*		Walkup Skydome; Flagstaff, AZ	ESPN+	W 66–6	7,342
September 7	7:00 p.m.	at No. 20 (FBS) Arizona*		Arizona Stadium; Tucson, AZ	ESPN+	L 10–22	47,746
September 14	6:00 p.m.	at Utah Tech*		Greater Zion Stadium; St. George, UT	ESPN+	W 45–17	3,938
September 21	4:00 p.m.	at No. 15 Incarnate Word*		Gayle and Tom Benson Stadium; San Antonio, TX	ESPN+	L 14–38	1,413
September 28	1:00 p.m.	No. 10 Sacramento State		Walkup Skydome; Flagstaff, AZ	ESPN+	W 34–16	9,232
October 5	2:00 p.m.	at No. 10 Idaho	No. 25	Kibbie Dome; Moscow, ID	ESPN+	L 17–23	14,066
October 12	1:00 p.m.	at No. 14 Montana	No. 24	Washington–Grizzly Stadium; Missoula, MT	ESPN+	L 20–31	26,229
October 19	1:00 p.m.	Idaho State^{†}		Walkup Skydome; Flagstaff, AZ	ESPN+	W 30–26	8,212
November 2	1:00 p.m.	Weber State		Walkup Skydome; Flagstaff, AZ	ESPN+	W 27–6	6,154
November 9	6:00 p.m.	at Cal Poly		Alex G. Spanos Stadium; San Luis Obispo, CA	ESPN+	W 31–14	6,231
November 16	12:00 p.m.	at Northern Colorado	No. 25	Nottingham Field; Greeley, CO	ESPN+	W 44–3	2,279
November 23	1:00 p.m.	Eastern Washington	No. 21	Walkup Skydome; Flagstaff, AZ	ESPN+	W 30–18	7,113
November 30	1:00 p.m.	at No. 15 Abilene Christian*	No. 17	Wildcat Stadium; Abilene, TX (NCAA Division I First Round)	ESPN+	L 0–24	5,210
*Non-conference game; ^{†}Homecoming; Rankings from STATS Poll released prior to the game; All times are in Mountain time

== Game summaries ==
=== Lincoln (CA) (IND) ===
Game One – Lincoln (CA) Oaklanders (IND) (0–0) at Northern Arizona Lumberjacks (0–0) – Game summary

Quarter	1	2	3	4	Total
Oaklanders (IND) (Note: Lincoln is unaffiliated with any national sanctioning body and permanently plays as a travel team.)	0	6	0	0	6
Lumberjacks	21	24	14	7	66

at Walkup Skydome • Flagstaff, AZ

- Date: Saturday August 31, 2024
- Game time: 1:00 p.m.
- Game weather: None (played indoors)
- Game attendance: 7,342
- Referee: Scott Root
- TV announcers (ESPN+): Mitch Strohman, Kevin Stephens, Ava Nichols

Game information

First quarter

- (6:42) NAU – Ty Pennington 20-yard run, Marcus Lye kick (Drive: 7 plays, 55 yards, 3:53; Northern Arizona 7–0)
- (3:24) NAU – Seth Cromwell 2-yard run, Marcus Lye kick (Drive: 3 plays, 34 yards, 0:59; Northern Arizona 14–0)
- (1:27) NAU – Elijah Taylor 15-yard punt return, Marcus Lye kick (Northern Arizona 21–0)

Second quarter

- (11:32) LCA – Darius Maxwell 38-yard pass from Jack Clavel (Drive: 9 plays, 75 yards, 3:28; Northern Arizona 21–6)
- (11:32) NAU – Ammon Allen 97-yard PAT return (Northern Arizona 23–6)
- (11:18) NAU – BJ Fleming 62-yard pass from Ty Pennington, J'Wan Evans rush (Drive: 1 play, 62 yards, 0:09; Northern Arizona 31–6)
- (4:09) NAU – Bryzai White 8-yard pass from Angel Flores, Marcus Lye kick (Drive: 4 plays, 50 yards, 1:43; Northern Arizona 38–6)
- (1:57) NAU – Ta'ir Brooks 13-yard pass from Angel Flores, Marcus Lye kick (Drive: 1 play, 22 yards, 0:15; Northern Arizona 45–6)

Third quarter

- (8:55) NAU – Seth Cromwell 1-yard run, Jordan Westrich kick (Drive: 10 plays, 57 yards, 4:59; Northern Arizona 52–6)
- (2:51) NAU – J'Wan Evans 1-yard run, Jordan Westrich kick (Drive: 6 plays, 38 yards, 3:16; Northern Arizona 59–6)

Fourth quarter

- (14:11) NAU – Kenveon Stone 5-yard run, Jordan Westrich kick (Drive: 5 plays, 57 yards, 2:49; Northern Arizona 66–6)

Statistics	LCLN	NAU
First downs	6	22
Total yards	168	452
Rushing yards	87	235
Passing yards	81	217
Passing: Comp–Att–Int	11–20–1	13–17–1
Time of possession	31:23	25:20

Team	Category	Player	Statistics
Lincoln (CA)	Passing	Jack Clavel	10/19, 78 yards, TD, INT
Lincoln (CA)	Rushing	Anastacio Prado	18 carries, 59 yards
Lincoln (CA)	Receiving	Darius Maxwell	2 receptions, 35 yards, TD
Northern Arizona	Passing	Ty Pennington	7/9, 114 yards, TD
Northern Arizona	Rushing	J'Wan Evans	6 carries, 48 yards, TD
Northern Arizona	Receiving	BJ Fleming	3 receptions, 98 yards, TD

=== at No. 20 Arizona (FBS) ===
Game Two – Northern Arizona Lumberjacks (1–0) vs No. 20 Arizona Wildcats (FBS) (1–0) – Game summary

Quarter	1	2	3	4	Total
Lumberjacks	0	10	0	0	10
No. 20 (FBS) Wildcats	3	3	7	9	22

at Arizona Stadium • Tucson, AZ

- Date: September 7, 2024
- Game time: 7:00 p.m.
- Game weather: Sunny, 92 °F (33 °C)
- Game attendance: 47,746
- Referee: Michael VanderVelde
- TV announcers (ESPN+): Chris Sylvester (play-by-play), Brad Hopkins (analyst), and Shane Sparks (sideline reporter)

Game information

First quarter

- (11:33) ARIZ – Tyler Loop 33-yard field goal (Drive: 6 plays, 69 yards, 3:23; Arizona 3–0)

Second quarter

- (10:24) NAU – Xander Werner 25-yard pass from Isaiah Eastman, Marcus Lye kick (Drive: 10 plays, 83 yards, 4:58; Northern Arizona 7–3)
- (6:20) NAU – Marcus Lye 38-yard field goal (Drive: 6 plays, 42 yards, 2:34; Northern Arizona 10–3)
- (0:32) ARIZ – Tyler Loop 48-yard field goal (Drive: 6 plays, 12 yards, 2:11; Northern Arizona 10–6)

Third quarter

- (12:06) ARIZ – Jeremiah Patterson 17-yard pass from Noah Fifita, Tyler Loop kick (Drive: 3 plays, 34 yards, 1:46; Arizona 13–10)

Fourth quarter

- (11:33) ARIZ – Team safety (Arizona 15–10)
- (9:32) ARIZ – Kedrick Reescano 56-yard run, Tyler Loop kick (Drive: 4 plays, 80 yards, 1:53; Arizona 22–10)

Statistics	NAU	ARIZ
First downs	14	18
Total yards	198	361
Rushing yards	31–89	29–188
Passing yards	109	173
Passing: Comp–Att–Int	15–25–0	18–26–1
Time of possession	27:23	32:37

Team	Category	Player	Statistics
Northern Arizona	Passing	Ty Pennington	14/24, 84 yards
Northern Arizona	Rushing	Seth Cromwell	11 carries, 41 yards
Northern Arizona	Receiving	Xander Werner	1 reception, 25 yards, TD
Arizona	Passing	Noah Fifita	18/26, 173 yards, TD, INT
Arizona	Rushing	Quali Conley	17 carries, 112 yards
Arizona	Receiving	Quali Conley	5 receptions, 38 yards

=== at Utah Tech ===
Game Three – Northern Arizona Lumberjacks (1–1) at Utah Tech Trailblazers (0–2) – Game summary

Quarter	1	2	3	4	Total
Lumberjacks	0	0	0	0	0
Trailblazers	0	0	0	0	0

at Greater Zion Stadium • St. George, UT

- Date: Saturday September 14, 2024
- Game time: 7:00 p.m.
- Game weather: 0 °F (−18 °C)
- TV announcers (ESPN+): Rod Zundel, Max Christensen III

Game information

First quarter
Second quarter
Third quarter
Fourth quarter

Statistics	NAU	UTU
First downs		
Total yards		
Rushing yards		
Passing yards		
Passing: Comp–Att–Int		
Time of possession		

Team	Category	Player	Statistics
Northern Arizona	Passing		
Northern Arizona	Rushing		
Northern Arizona	Receiving		
Utah Tech	Passing		
Utah Tech	Rushing		
Utah Tech	Receiving		

=== at No. 15 Incarnate Word ===
Game Four – Northern Arizona Lumberjacks (2–1) at No. 15 Incarnate Word Cardinals (1–2) – Game summary

Quarter	1	2	3	4	Total
Lumberjacks	7	7	0	0	14
No. 15 Cardinals	7	10	14	7	38

at Gayle and Tom Benson Stadium • San Antonio, TX

- Date: Saturday September 21, 2024
- Game time: 4:00 p.m.
- Game weather: Sunny • Temperature: 94 °F (34 °C) • Wind: SE 11 mph
- Game attendance: 1,413
- Referee: Gary Leeper
- TV announcers (ESPN+): Karl Schoening, Blair Villareal

Game information

First quarter

- NAU – 10:38 Darvon Hubbard 47-yard run, Marcus Lye kick
  NAU 7–0 Drive: 1 play, 47 yards, 0:09
- UIW – 4:03 Mason Pierce 13 pass from Zach Calzada, Brack Peacock kick
  Tied 7–7 Drive: 11 plays, 47 yards, 3:29

Second quarter

- NAU – 8:29 Tay Lanier 37-yard pass from Ty Pennington, Marcus Lye kick
  NAU 14–7 Drive: 9 plays, 68 yards, 4:28
- UIW – 1:51 Dekalon Taylor 35-yard run, Brack Peacock kick
  Tied 14–14 Drive: 7 plays, 81 yards, 2:46
- UIW – 0:00 Brack Peacock 40-yard field goal
  UIW 17–14 Drive: 3 plays, 1 yard, 0:43

Third quarter

- UIW – 11:08 Roy Alexander 10-yard run, Brack Peacock kick
  UIW 24–14 Drive: 2 plays, 13 yards, 0:24
- UIW – 6:00 Dekalon Taylor 97-yard run, Brack Peacock kick
  UIW 31–14 Drive: 1 play, 97 yards, 0:24

Fourth quarter

- UIW – 7:06 Roy Alexander 32-yard pass from Zach Calzada, Brack Peacock kick
  UIW 38–14 Drive: 7 plays, 72 yards, 3:28

Statistics	NAU	UIW
First downs	21	18
Total yards	439	412
Rushing yards	166	232
Passing yards	273	180
Passing: Comp–Att–Int	24–41–0	14–23–0
Time of possession	33:39	26:21

Team	Category	Player	Statistics
Northern Arizona	Passing	Ty Pennington	20/35, 247 yards, TD
Northern Arizona	Rushing	Darvon Hubbard	12 carries, 85 yards, TD
Northern Arizona	Receiving	Bryzai White	4 receptions, 63 yards
Incarnate Word	Passing	Zach Calzada	14/23, 180 yards, 2 TD
Incarnate Word	Rushing	Dekalon Taylor	17 carries, 184 yards, 2 TD
Incarnate Word	Receiving	Roy Alexander	5 receptions, 76 yards, TD

=== No. 10 Sacramento State ===
Game Five – No. 10 Sacramento State Hornets (2–2) vs Northern Arizona Lumberjacks (2–2) – Game summary

Quarter	1	2	3	4	Total
No. 10 Hornets	0	0	0	0	0
Lumberjacks	0	0	0	0	0

at Walkup Skydome • Flagstaff, AZ

- Date: Saturday September 28, 2024
- Game time: 1:00 p.m. PST
- Game weather: 0 °F (−18 °C)
- TV announcers (ESPN+): Mitch Strohman (play-by-play), Kevin Stephens (analyst) and Ava Nichols (sideline)

Game information

First quarter
Second quarter
Third quarter
Fourth quarter

Statistics	SAC	NAU
First downs		
Total yards		
Rushing yards		
Passing yards		
Passing: Comp–Att–Int		
Time of possession		

Team	Category	Player	Statistics
Sacramento State	Passing		
Sacramento State	Rushing		
Sacramento State	Receiving		
Northern Arizona	Passing		
Northern Arizona	Rushing		
Northern Arizona	Receiving		

=== at No. 10 Idaho ===
Game Six – No. 25 Northern Arizona Lumberjacks (3–2) at No. 10 Idaho Vandals (3–2) – Game summary

Quarter	1	2	3	4	Total
No. 25 Lumberjacks	7	3	0	7	17
No. 10 Vandals	6	14	3	0	23

at Kibbie Dome • Moscow, ID

- Date: October 5, 2024
- Game time: 2:00 p.m. PST
- Game weather: Sunny
- Game attendance: 14,066
- Referee: Robert Quello
- TV announcers (ESPN+): Bob Castle, Brian Strandley

Game information

First quarter

- IDHO – Mike Martinez 9-yard pass from Jack Wagner (PAT failed), 4:27. Vandals 6–0. Drive: 7 plays, 69 yards, 4:32.
- NAU – Bryzai White 50-yard pass from Ty Pennington (Marcus Lye kick), 1:45. Lumberjacks 7–6. Drive: 6 plays, 75 yards, 2:42.

Second quarter

- IDHO – Nate Thomas 13-yard run (Cameron Pope kick), 11:20. Vandals 13–7. Drive: 8 plays, 75 yards, 5:25.
- NAU – Marcus Lye 50-yard field goal, 4:43. Vandals 13–10. Drive: 12 plays, 43 yards, 6:37.
- IDHO – Jordan Dwyer 23-yard pass from Nick Josifek (Cameron Pope kick), 2:01. Vandals 20–10. Drive: 6 plays, 75 yards, 2:42.

Third quarter

- IDHO – Cameron Pope 40-yard field goal, 10:24. Vandals 23–10. Drive: 9 plays, 52 yards, 4:36.

Fourth quarter

- NAU – PJ London 2-yard run (Marcus Lye kick), 4:11. Vandals 23–17. Drive: 9 plays, 63 yards, 4:43.

Statistics	NAU	IDHO
First downs	16	15
Total yards	314	313
Rushing yards	118	189
Passing yards	196	124
Turnovers	2	1
Time of possession	28:45	31:15

Team	Category	Player	Statistics
Northern Arizona	Passing	Ty Pennington	12/17, 114 yards, TD
Northern Arizona	Rushing	J'Wan Evans	6 carries, 35 yards
Northern Arizona	Receiving	Bryzai White	4 receptions, 72 yards, TD
Idaho	Passing	Nick Josifek	6/7, 109 yards, TD
Idaho	Rushing	Elisha Cummings	17 carries, 119 yards
Idaho	Receiving	Mark Hamper	3 receptions, 48 yards

=== at No. 14 Montana ===
Game Seven – No. 24 Northern Arizona Lumberjacks (3–3) at No. 14 Montana Grizzlies (4–2) – Game summary

Quarter	1	2	3	4	Total
No. 24 Lumberjacks	0	0	0	0	0
No. 14 Grizzlies	0	0	0	0	0

at Washington–Grizzly Stadium • Missoula, MT

- Date: October 12, 2024
- Game time: 1:00 p.m. PST
- TV announcers (ESPN+): Ben Creighton, Ty Gregorak, Grace Lawrence

Game information

First quarter
Second quarter
Third quarter
Fourth quarter

Statistics	NAU	MONT
First downs		
Total yards		
Rushing yards		
Passing yards		
Turnovers		
Time of possession		

Team	Category	Player	Statistics
Northern Arizona	Passing		
Northern Arizona	Rushing		
Northern Arizona	Receiving		
Montana	Passing		
Montana	Rushing		
Montana	Receiving		

=== Idaho State ===
Game Eight – Idaho State Bengals (3–4) at Northern Arizona Lumberjacks (3–4) – Game summary

Quarter	1	2	3	4	Total
Bengals	0	0	0	0	0
Lumberjacks	0	0	0	0	0

at Walkup Skydome • Flagstaff, AZ

- Date: Saturday October 19, 2024
- Game time: 1:00 p.m. PST
- TV announcers (ESPN+): Mitch Strohman, Kevin Stephens, Ava Nichols

Game information

First quarter
Second quarter
Third quarter
Fourth quarter

Statistics	IDST	NAU
First downs		
Total yards		
Rushing yards		
Passing yards		
Passing: Comp–Att–Int		
Time of possession		

Team	Category	Player	Statistics
Idaho State	Passing		
Idaho State	Rushing		
Idaho State	Receiving		
Northern Arizona	Passing		
Northern Arizona	Rushing		
Northern Arizona	Receiving		

=== Weber State ===
Game Nine – Weber State Wildcats (3–5) vs Northern Arizona Lumberjacks (4–4) – Game summary

Quarter	1	2	3	4	Total
Wildcats	0	0	0	0	0
Lumberjacks	0	0	0	0	0

at Walkup Skydome • Flagstaff, AZ

- Date: Saturday November 2, 2024
- Game time: 1:00 p.m. PST
- Game weather: 0 °F (−18 °C)
- TV announcers (ESPN+): Mitch Strohman, Kevin Stephens, Ava Nichols

Game information

First quarter
Second quarter
Third quarter
Fourth quarter

Statistics	WEB	NAU
First downs		
Total yards		
Rushing yards		
Passing yards		
Passing: Comp–Att–Int		
Time of possession		

Team	Category	Player	Statistics
Weber State	Passing		
Weber State	Rushing		
Weber State	Receiving		
Northern Arizona	Passing		
Northern Arizona	Rushing		
Northern Arizona	Receiving		

=== at Cal Poly ===
Game Ten – Northern Arizona Lumberjacks (5–4) vs Cal Poly Mustangs (2–6) – Game summary

Quarter	1	2	3	4	Total
Lumberjacks	0	0	0	0	0
Mustangs	0	0	0	0	0

at Alex G. Spanos Stadium • San Luis Obispo, CA

- Date: Saturday November 9, 2024
- Game time: 6:00 p.m.
- Game weather: 0 °F (−18 °C)
- TV announcers (ESPN+): Chris Sylvester, John Kane

Game information

First quarter
Second quarter
Third quarter
Fourth quarter

Statistics	NAU	CP
First downs		
Total yards		
Rushing yards		
Passing yards		
Passing: Comp–Att–Int		
Time of possession		

Team	Category	Player	Statistics
Northern Arizona	Passing		
Northern Arizona	Rushing		
Northern Arizona	Receiving		
Cal Poly	Passing		
Cal Poly	Rushing		
Cal Poly	Receiving		

=== at Northern Colorado ===
Game Eleven – No. 25 Northern Arizona Lumberjacks (6–4) vs Northern Colorado Bears (1–9) – Game summary

Quarter	1	2	3	4	Total
No. 25 Lumberjacks	0	0	0	0	0
Bears	0	0	0	0	0

at Nottingham Field • Greeley, CO

- Date: Saturday November 16, 2024
- Game time: 12:00 p.m.
- Game weather: 0 °F (−18 °C)
- TV announcers (ESPN+): Christian Saez, Nick Hager

Game information

First quarter
Second quarter
Third quarter
Fourth quarter

Statistics	NAU	UNCO
First downs		
Total yards		
Rushing yards		
Passing yards		
Passing: Comp–Att–Int		
Time of possession		

Team	Category	Player	Statistics
Northern Arizona	Passing		
Northern Arizona	Rushing		
Northern Arizona	Receiving		
Northern Colorado	Passing		
Northern Colorado	Rushing		
Northern Colorado	Receiving		

=== Eastern Washington ===
Game Twelve – Eastern Washington Eagles (4–7) vs No. 21 Northern Arizona Lumberjacks (7–4) – Game summary

Quarter	1	2	3	4	Total
Eagles	0	7	11	0	18
No. 21 Lumberjacks	7	7	3	13	30

at Walkup Skydome • Flagstaff, AZ

- Date: Saturday November 23, 2024
- Game time: 1:00 p.m.
- Game weather: None (played indoors)
- Game attendance: 7,113
- Referee: Michael Bezner
- TV announcers (ESPN+): Mitch Strohman (play-by-play), Kevin Stephens (analyst) and Ava Nichols (sideline)

Game information

First quarter

- (0:05) NAU – Kolbe Katsis 75-yard pass from Ty Pennington, Samuel Hunsaker kick (Drive: 3 plays, 86 yards, 1:35; Northern Arizona 7–0)

Second quarter

- (9:30) EWU – Jett Carpenter 2-yard pass from Jared Taylor, Soren McKee kick (Drive: 11 plays, 50 yards, 5:30; Tied 7–7)
- (5:40) NAU – Tay Lanier 40-yard pass from Isaiah Eastman, Samuel Hunsaker kick (Drive: 7 plays, 90 yards, 3:43; Northern Arizona 14–7)

Third quarter

- (14:53) EWU – Matthew Brown 0-yard safety (Northern Arizona 14–9)
- (10:52) EWU – Efton Chism III 67-yard pass from Jared Taylor (Drive: 1 play, 67 yards, 0:18; Eastern Washington 15–14)
- (8:40) NAU – Samuel Hunsaker 21-yard field goal (Drive: 7 plays, 72 yards, 2:12; Northern Arizona 17–15)
- (2:45) EWU – Soren McKee 31-yard field goal (Drive: 13 plays, 62 yards, 5:48; Eastern Washington 18–17)

Fourth quarter

- (13:53) NAU – Seth Crowell 6-yard run (Drive: 7 plays, 61 yards, 3:46; Northern Arizona 23–18)
- (2:17) NAU – Ty Pennington 12-yard run, Samuel Hunsaker kick (Drive: 12 plays, 66 yards, 6:29; Northern Arizona 30–18)

Statistics	EWU	NAU
First downs	16	28
Total yards	301	539
Rushing yards	134	187
Passing yards	167	352
Passing: Comp–Att–Int	19–27–1	16–30–0
Time of possession	28:45	31:15

Team	Category	Player	Statistics
Eastern Washington	Passing	Kekoa Visperas	15/22, 94 yards, INT
Eastern Washington	Rushing	Kekoa Visperas	6 carries, 62 yards
Eastern Washington	Receiving	Efton Chism III	13 receptions, 119 yards, TD
Northern Arizona	Passing	Ty Pennington	15/29, 312 yards, TD
Northern Arizona	Rushing	Seth Cromwell	20 carries, 112 yards, TD
Northern Arizona	Receiving	Kolbe Katsis	3 receptions, 130 yards, TD

=== at No. 15 Abilene Christian (NCAA Division I playoff–first round) ===
Game Thirteen – No. 17 Northern Arizona Lumberjacks (8–4) at No. 15 Abilene Christian Wildcat (8–4) – Game summary

Quarter	1	2	3	4	Total
No. 17 Lumberjacks	0	0	0	0	0
No. 15 Wildcats	7	3	0	14	24

at Wildcat Stadium, Abilene, TX

- Date: November 30, 2024
- Game time: 1:00 p.m. MST
- Game weather: Sunny, 62 °F (17 °C)
- Game attendance: 5,210
- Referee: Jeremy DeAngelo
- TV announcers (ESPN+): Ted Emrich (play-by-play) and Taylor McHargue (analyst)

Game information

First quarter

- ACU – Trey Cleveland 37-yard pass from Carson Haggard (Ritse Vaes kick), 3:18. Wildcats 7–0. Drive: 10 plays, 97 yards, 4:36.

Second quarter

- ACU – Ritse Vaes 46-yard field goal, 3:17. Wildcats 10–0. Drive: 10 plays, 66 yards, 6:13.

Third quarter

No scoring plays

Fourth quarter

- ACU – Sam Hicks 53-yard run (Ritse Vaes kick), 10:16. Wildcats 17–0. Drive: 1 play, 53 yards, 0:10.
- ACU – Blayne Taylor 6-yard pass from Carson Haggard (Ritse Vaes kick), 2:16. Wildcats 24–0. Drive: 11 plays, 67 yards, 5:41.

Statistics	NAU	ACU
First downs	11	18
Total yards	194	474
Rushing yards	29	230
Passing yards	165	244
Turnovers	1	3
Time of possession	26:25	33:35

Team	Category	Player	Statistics
Northern Arizona	Passing	Ty Pennington	16/31, 165 yards, INT
Northern Arizona	Rushing	Seth Cromwell	8 carries, 19 yards
Northern Arizona	Receiving	Tay Lanier	1 reception, 36 yards
Abilene Christian	Passing	Carson Haggard	23/29, 244 yards, 2 TD, 3 INT
Abilene Christian	Rushing	Sam Hicks	22 carries, 171 yards, TD
Abilene Christian	Receiving	Blayne Taylor	5 receptions, 89 yards, TD
