= Garrett Mack =

American football coach (born c. 1989–1990)

Current position
- Title: Defensive line coach
- Team: Akron
- Conference: MAC

Biographical details
- Born: c. 1989 or 1990 (age 36–37); Brunswick, Ohio, U.S.
- Education: Baldwin Wallace University (2015)

Coaching career (HC unless noted)
- 2013: Baldwin Wallace (SA)
- 2013–2014: Fairview HS (OH) (DC/DB)
- 2015: Holy Name HS (OH) (DC/LB)
- 2016: Oberlin HS (OH)
- 2017: Oberlin (LB)
- 2018: Baldwin Wallace (WR)
- 2019: Oberlin (LB)
- 2020–2021: Notre Dame (OH) (DL)
- 2022–2023: Notre Dame (OH)
- 2024: Duquesne (DL)
- 2025: Duquesne (DL/STC/RC)
- 2026–present: Akron (DL)

Head coaching record
- Overall: 16–6 (college); 4–6 (high school)
- Tournaments: 0–1 (NCAA D-II playoffs)

Accomplishments and honors

Championships
- 1 MEC (2022)

Garrett Mack (born c. 1989 or 1990) is an American college football coach. He is the defensive line coach for University of Akron, a position he has held since 2026. He was the head football coach for Notre Dame College from 2022 until 2023 when the school announced it was closing. He coached for Baldwin Wallace, Fairview High School, Holy Name High School, Oberlin High School, and Oberlin.

== Head coaching record ==
=== College ===
Year	Team	Overall	Conference	Standing	Bowl/playoffs	AFCA^{#}
Notre Dame Falcons (Mountain East Conference) (2022–2023)
2022	Notre Dame	9–3	9–1	1st	L NCAA Division II First Round	23
2023	Notre Dame	7–3	6–3	T–2nd		
Notre Dame:		16–6	15–4			
Total:		16–6				
National championship Conference title Conference division title or championship game berth

=== High school ===
Year	Team	Overall	Conference	Standing	Bowl/playoffs
Oberlin Phoenix () (2016)
2016	Oberlin	4–6	2–3	4th	
Oberlin:		4–6	2–3		
Total:		4–6			
