= Brian Wright (American football) =

American football coach and player (born 1972)

Current position
- Title: Head coach
- Team: Northern Arizona
- Conference: Big Sky
- Record: 23–13

Biographical details
- Born: May 12, 1972 (age 54); Goldsboro, North Carolina, U.S.
- Education: The College of Wooster, BA; Walsh University, M.Ed.

Playing career
- 1991–1994: Wooster
- Position: Wide receiver

Coaching career (HC unless noted)
- 1994: Wooster (SA)
- 1995–1996: Walsh (GA)
- 1997: Youngstown State (GA)
- 1998: Walsh (PGC/WR)
- 1999: Walsh (co-ST/PGC/QB)
- 2000: Walsh (OC/QB)
- 2001–2002: Youngstown State (QB)
- 2003: Youngstown State (QB/WR)
- 2004: Youngstown State (RC)
- 2005–2007: Youngstown State (OC/QB/RC)
- 2008–2009: Youngstown State (OC/QB)
- 2010–2011: Montana State (OC/QB)
- 2012–2013: Florida Atlantic (OC/QB)
- 2013: Florida Atlantic (interim HC)
- 2014–2015: Florida Atlantic (AHC/OC/QB)
- 2016–2019: Toledo (OC/QB)
- 2020–2023: Pittsburg State
- 2024–present: Northern Arizona

Head coaching record
- Overall: 60–21
- Tournaments: 0–1 (NCAA D-I FCS playoffs); 2–2 (NCAA D-II playoffs)

Accomplishments and honors

Championships
- 2 MIAA (2022, 2023)

Awards
- MIAA Coach of the Year (2022)

Brian Wright (born May 12, 1972) is an American college football coach and former player. He became the head football coach for Northern Arizona University in 2024. He was the head football coach at Pittsburg State University from 2020 to 2023. He was the interim head football coach for Florida Atlantic University in 2013. He also coached for Wooster, Walsh, Youngstown State, Montana State, Florida Atlantic, and Toledo. He played college football for Wooster as wide receiver.

== Playing career ==
Wright played wide receiver at the College of Wooster from 1991 to 1994, before a career ending injury ended his senior season, allowing him to serve as a student assistant coach.

== Coaching career ==
Wright began his coaching career in 1994, as a student assistant during his senior year at Wooster, following a career ending injury. He worked with the wide receivers. For the 1995 and 1996 seasons, Wright was a graduate assistant at Walsh University in Ohio. In 1997. Wright was a graduate assistant for Youngstown State. He worked with the wide receivers.

Wright then returned to Walsh as the wide receivers coach in 1998. In 1999, he moved to quarterbacks coach and added co-special teams coordinator to his responsibilities. In 2000, Wright was promoted to offensive coordinator while continuing to coach quarterbacks.

From 2001 to 2004, Wright coached the quarterbacks at Youngstown State. Prior to the 2005 season, he was promoted to offensive coordinator, a position he held through the 2009 season. From 2004 to 2007, he was also the recruiting coordinator for Youngstown State.

In 2010 and 2011, Wright was the offensive coordinator for the Bobcats of Montana State. In 2012, Wright joined the Florida Atlantic football staff as offensive coordinator and quarterbacks coach, positions he held his entire time there, from 2012 to 2015. Wright served as the interim head coach for the final four games of the 2013 season, leading the Owls to a 4–0 mark, and going 3–0 in Conference USA play. The owls finished the season 6–6 overall, reaching bowl eligibility for the first time since 2008. Wright was made associate head coach along with his coordinator and quarterback responsibilities for the 2014 and 2015 seasons.

In 2016, Wright moved to the University of Toledo to be the offensive coordinator and quarterbacks coach. On December 7, 2019, Wright was named the head football coach at Pittsburg State University in Pittsburg, Kansas. Wright guided the Gorillas to a 33–8 overall record and 2 conference championships in 4 seasons at the helm.

On December 3, 2023, Northern Arizona vice president for intercollegiate athletics, Mike Marlow announced Wright as the 31st head football coach of the Northern Arizona Lumberjacks in Flagstaff, Arizona. In 2024 Wright led the Lumberjacks to an 8–4 record and their first playoff appearance since 2017 and its first 8-win season since 2013.

== Personal life ==
Wright attended Wooster High School in Wooster, Ohio, and earned his bachelor's degree in business from The College of Wooster in 1994 and his master's degree in education from Walsh University in 1998. He and his wife Laura have three children, Jake, Marielle, and Joseph.

== Head coaching record ==
Year	Team	Overall	Conference	Standing	Bowl/playoffs	AFCA^{#}	D2^{°}
Florida Atlantic Owls (Conference USA) (2013)
2013	Florida Atlantic	4–0 (Note: Carl Pelini served as Florida Atlantic's head coach for the first eight games of the 2013 season before resigning. Wright was appointed interim head coach and led the team for the final four games of the season. Florida Atlantic finished the year with an overall record of 6–6 overall and a mark of 4–4 in conference play.)	3–0	4th (East)			
Florida Atlantic:		4–0	3–0				
Pittsburg State Gorillas (Mid-America Intercollegiate Athletics Association) (2020–2023)
2020–21	Pittsburg State	2–2	0–0	N/A			
2021	Pittsburg State	8–3	8–3	4th			
2022	Pittsburg State	12–1	11–0	1st	L NCAA Division II Second Round	5	
2023	Pittsburg State	11–2	9–1	T–1st	L NCAA Division II Second Round	5	5
Pittsburg State:		33–8	28–4				
Northern Arizona Lumberjacks (Big Sky Conference) (2024–present)
2024	Northern Arizona	8–5	6–2	T–3rd	L NCAA Division I First Round	22	17
2025	Northern Arizona	7–5	4–4	T–6th			
2026	Northern Arizona	8–3	6–2				
Northern Arizona:		23–13	16–8				
Total:		60–21					
National championship Conference title Conference division title or championship game berth
