= Mickey Mental =

American football coach (born 1985)

Current position
- Title: Quarterbacks coach & passing game coordinator
- Team: Baldwin–Wallace
- Conference: OAC

Biographical details
- Born: July 6, 1985 (age 41); Olmsted Falls, Ohio, U.S.

Playing career
- 2003–2006: Baldwin–Wallace
- Position: Quarterback

Coaching career (HC unless noted)
- 2008: Brookside HS (OH) (QB)
- 2009–2012: Notre Dame (OH) (GA)
- 2013–2014: Notre Dame (OH) (RC)
- 2015–2019: Notre Dame (OH) (OC)
- 2020–2021: Notre Dame (OH)
- 2022: Weber State (OC)
- 2023–2025: Weber State
- 2026–present: Baldwin–Wallace (QB/PGC)

Head coaching record
- Overall: 29–22
- Tournaments: 1–1 (NCAA D-II playoffs)

Accomplishments and honors

Championships
- 2 MEC (2020–2021)

Awards
- MEC Coach of the Year (2020)

Michael Mental (born July 6, 1985) is an American college football coach and former player. He most recently served as the head football coach at Weber State University in Ogden, Utah from 2023 to 2025. Mental was a three-year starting quarterback at Baldwin Wallace University in Berea, Ohio, and earned a tryout with the Cleveland Browns of the National Football League (NFL) after his college career ended. Mental later spent several seasons on the coaching staff of Notre Dame College in South Euclid, Ohio, culminating with a two-year stint as head coach, in 2020 and 2021. After these two years, Mental departed Notre Dame to spend 2022 as the offensive coordinator of Weber State. After the 2022 season, Weber State head coach Jay Hill departed Weber State to join the coaching staff at BYU, and Mental was promoted to head coach.

Mental was fired from Weber State on November 10, 2025, after compiling a 13–20 record in three seasons.

== Personal life ==
Mental is a native of Olmsted Falls, Ohio and attended Baldwin Wallace University. He is married to Jessica Mental.

== Head coaching record ==
Year	Team	Overall	Conference	Standing	Bowl/playoffs	AFCA^{#}
Notre Dame Falcons (Mountain East Conference) (2020–2021)
2020–21	Notre Dame	5–0	5–0	1st		
2021	Notre Dame	11–2	9–1	T–1st	L NCAA Division II Football Second Round	9
Notre Dame:		16–2	14–1			
Weber State Wildcats (Big Sky Conference) (2023–present)
2023	Weber State	6–5	4–4	T–6th		
2024	Weber State	4–8	3–5	T–6th		
2025	Weber State	3–7 (Note: Fired after ten games)	1–5			
Weber State:		13–20	8–14			
Total:		29–22				
National championship Conference title Conference division title or championship game berth
^{#}Rankings from final NCAA Division II AFCA Poll.
