= Notre Dame Falcons football =

NCAA Division II college football team

- First season: 2010
- Last season: 2023
- Athletic director: Duncan Williams
- Head coach: Garrett Mack; 2nd season, 16–6 (.727)
- Location: South Euclid, Ohio
- Stadium: Mueller Field (capacity: 2,000)
- NCAA division: Division II
- Conference: MEC
- Colors: Royal blue and gold
- All-time record: 101–55 (.647)
- Mascot: Falcons
- Website: notredamefalcons.com

The Notre Dame Falcons football team represented Notre Dame College in college football at the NCAA Division II level. The Falcons were members of the Mountain East Conference (MEC) and fielded its team in the MEC from 2013 to 2023. The Falcons played their home games at Mueller Field in South Euclid, Ohio.

Their final head coach was Garrett Mack, who took over the position for the 2022 season and held it until the school's closure following the 2023 season.

== Conference affiliations ==
- Division II Independent (2010–2011)
- Great Lakes Intercollegiate Athletic Conference (2012)
- Mountain East Conference (2013–2023)

== List of head coaches ==
=== Key ===
Key to symbols in coaches list
| General | | Overall | | Conference | | Postseason (Note: Although the first Rose Bowl Game was played in 1902, it has been continuously played since the 1916 game, and is recognized as the oldest bowl game by the NCAA. "—" indicates any season prior to 1916 when postseason games were not played.) | |
|---|---|---|---|---|---|---|---|
| No. | Order of coaches (Note: A running total of the number of head coaches, with coaches who served separate tenures being counted only once. Interim head coaches are represented with "Int" and are not counted in the running total. "—" indicates the team played but either without a coach or no coach is on record. "X" indicates an interim year without play.) | GC | Games coached | CW | Conference wins | PW | Postseason wins |
| DC | Division championships | OW | Overall wins | CL | Conference losses | PL | Postseason losses |
| CC | Conference championships | OL | Overall losses | CT | Conference ties | PT | Postseason ties |
| NC | National championships | OT | Overall ties (Note: Overtime rules in college football were introduced in 1996, making ties impossible in the period since.) | C% | Conference winning percentage | | |
| † | Elected to the College Football Hall of Fame | O% | Overall winning percentage (Note: When computing the win–loss percentage, a tie counts as half a win and half a loss.) | | | | |

=== Coaches ===
List of head football coaches showing season(s) coached, overall records, conference records, postseason records, championships and selected awards
| No. | Name | Season(s) | GC | OW | OL | O% | CW | CL | C% | PW | PL | DC | CC | NC | Awards |
|---|---|---|---|---|---|---|---|---|---|---|---|---|---|---|---|
| 1 | Adam Howard | 2010–2014 | 55 | 22 | 33 | 0.489 | 13 | 16 | 0.448 | 0 | 0 | 0 | 0 | 0 | 0 |
| 2 | Bill Rychel | 2015 | 11 | 5 | 6 | 0.455 | 5 | 5 | 0.500 | 0 | 0 | 0 | 0 | 0 | 0 |
| 3 | Mike Jacobs | 2016–2019 | 50 | 42 | 8 | 0.840 | 35 | 6 | 0.854 | 4 | 2 | 0 | 2 | 0 | 0 |
| 4 | Mickey Mental | 2020–2021 | 18 | 16 | 2 | 0.889 | 14 | 1 | 0.933 | 1 | 1 | 0 | 2 | 0 | 0 |
| 5 | Garrett Mack | 2022–2023 | 22 | 16 | 6 | 0.727 | 15 | 4 | 0.789 | 0 | 1 | 0 | 1 | 0 | 0 |

== Year-by-year results ==
| National champions | Conference champions | Bowl game berth | Playoff berth |

| Season | Year | Head coach | Association | Division | Conference | Record | | | | | Postseason | Final ranking |
| Season | Year | Head coach | Association | Division | Conference | Overall | | Conference | | | Postseason | Final ranking |
| Season | Year | Head coach | Association | Division | Conference | Win | Loss | Finish | Win | Loss | Postseason | Final ranking |
Notre Dame Falcons
| 2010 | 2010 | Adam Howard | NCAA | Division II | Independent | 2 | 9 | | | | — | — |
| 2011 | 2011 | Adam Howard | NCAA | Division II | Independent | 5 | 6 | | | | — | — |
| 2012 | 2012 | Adam Howard | NCAA | Division II | GLIAC | 3 | 8 | T–5th (South) | 2 | 8 | — | — |
| 2013 | 2013 | Adam Howard | NCAA | Division II | MEC | 5 | 6 | 6th | 4 | 5 | — | — |
| 2014 | 2014 | Adam Howard | NCAA | Division II | MEC | 7 | 4 | T–3rd | 7 | 3 | — | — |
| 2015 | 2015 | Bill Rychel | NCAA | Division II | MEC | 5 | 6 | T–5th | 5 | 5 | — | — |
| 2016 | 2016 | Mike Jacobs | NCAA | Division II | MEC | 9 | 2 | 2nd | 8 | 2 | — | — |
| 2017 | 2017 | Mike Jacobs | NCAA | Division II | MEC | 8 | 3 | T–2nd | 8 | 2 | — | — |
| 2018 | 2018 | Mike Jacobs | NCAA | Division II | MEC | 13 | 1 | 1st | 10 | 1 | L NCAA Division II Semifinal | 4 |
| 2019 | 2019 | Mike Jacobs | NCAA | Division II | MEC | 12 | 2 | 1st | 9 | 1 | L NCAA Division II Quarterfinal | 2 |
| 2020–21 | 2020 | Mickey Mental | NCAA | Division II | MEC | 5 | 0 | 1st | 5 | 0 | — | — |
| 2021 | 2021 | Mickey Mental | NCAA | Division II | MEC | 11 | 2 | T–1st | 9 | 1 | L NCAA Division II Football Second Round | 9 |
| 2022 | 2022 | Garrett Mack | NCAA | Division II | MEC | 9 | 3 | 1st | 9 | 1 | L NCAA Division II First Round | 23 |
| 2023 | 2023 | Garrett Mack | NCAA | Division II | MEC | 7 | 3 | T–2nd | 6 | 3 | — | — |
