= 2025 Weber State Wildcats football team =

American college football season

2025 Weber State Wildcats football
- Conference: Big Sky Conference
- Record: 4–8 (2–6 Big Sky)
- Head coach: Mickey Mental (3rd season; first 10 games); Brent Myers (interim; remainder of season)
- Offensive scheme: Power spread
- Defensive coordinator: Joe Dale (5th season)
- Base defense: Multiple 4–3
- Home stadium: Stewart Stadium

2025 Big Sky Conference football standings
	Conf.			Overall
Team	W		L	W		L
No. 1 Montana State $^	8	–	0	14	–	2
No. 3 Montana ^	7	–	1	13	–	2
No. 8 UC Davis ^	6	–	2	9	–	4
Sacramento State	5	–	3	7	–	5
Idaho State	5	–	3	6	–	6
Northern Arizona	4	–	4	7	–	5
Eastern Washington	4	–	4	5	–	7
Cal Poly	2	–	6	4	–	8
Idaho	2	–	6	4	–	8
Northern Colorado	2	–	6	4	–	8
Weber State	2	–	6	4	–	8
Portland State	1	–	7	1	–	11
$ – Conference champion; ^ – FCS playoff participant; Rankings from STATS Poll

The 2025 Weber State Wildcats football team represented Weber State University as a member of the Big Sky Conference during the 2025 NCAA Division I FCS football season. The Wildcats were led by third-year head coach Mickey Mental through the first ten games of the season before his firing on November 10; associate head coach Brent Myers was named interim head coach for the remainder of the season.

The team played its home games at Stewart Stadium in Ogden, Utah.

== Schedule ==
Date	Time	Opponent	Site	TV	Result	Attendance
August 30	4:00 p.m.	at James Madison*	Bridgeforth Stadium; Harrisonburg, VA	ESPN+	L 10–45	24,965
September 6	8:00 p.m.	at Arizona*	Arizona Stadium; Tucson, AZ	ESPN+	L 3–45	40,038
September 13	5:00 p.m.	at McNeese*	Cowboy Stadium; Lake Charles, LA	ESPN+	W 42–41	11,702
September 20	7:00 p.m.	Butler*	Stewart Stadium; Ogden, UT	ESPN+	W 38–24	6,393
September 27	8:00 p.m.	at No. 9 UC Davis	UC Davis Health Stadium; Davis, CA	ESPN+	L 12–34	12,238
October 11	6:00 p.m.	Sacramento State	Stewart Stadium; Ogden, UT	ESPN+	L 27–55	2,126
October 18	3:00 p.m.	at Portland State	Hillsboro Stadium; Hillsboro, OR	ESPN+	W 43–27	1,489
October 25	1:00 p.m.	Eastern Washington	Stewart Stadium; Ogden, UT	ESPN+	L 20–23	3,682
November 1	1:00 p.m.	No. 3 Montana	Stewart Stadium; Ogden, UT	ESPN+	L 17–38	5,095
November 8	1:00 p.m.	at No. 3 Montana State	Bobcat Stadium; Bozeman, MT	ESPN+	L 14–66	21,467
November 15	4:00 p.m.	at Idaho State	ICCU Dome; Pocatello, ID	ESPN+	L 3–31	7,367
November 22	1:00 p.m.	No. 23 Northern Arizona	Stewart Stadium; Ogden, UT	ESPN+	W 48–28	3,149
*Non-conference game; Rankings from STATS Poll released prior to the game; All times are in Mountain time

== Game summaries ==
=== at James Madison (FBS) ===
Weber State Wildcats (0–0) at James Madison Dukes (FBS) (0–0) – Game summary

Quarter	1	2	3	4	Total
Wildcats	0	7	3	0	10
Dukes (FBS)	14	14	3	14	45

at Bridgeforth Stadium • Harrisonburg, VA

- Date: August 30
- Game time: 6:00 PM EDT
- Game attendance: 24,965
- Referee: Tim Barker
- TV announcers (ESPN+): Curt Dudley, Delvin Joyce, and David Hulvey

Game information

First quarter

- JMU – Alonza Barnett III 11-yard run (Morgan Suarez kick), 8:25. Dukes 7–0. Drive: 10 plays, 78 yards, 4:46.
- JMU – Isaiah Alston 20-yard pass from Alonza Barnett III (Morgan Suarez kick), 0:46. Dukes 14–0. Drive: 10 plays, 59 yards, 5:16.

Second quarter

- JMU – Matthew Sluka 1-yard run (Morgan Suarez kick), 7:12. Dukes 21–0. Drive: 10 plays, 57 yards, 4:34.
- JMU – Landon Ellis 14-yard pass from Matthew Sluka (Morgan Suarez kick), 3:36. Dukes 28–0. Drive: 3 plays, 31 yards, 0:39.
- WEB – Noah Kjar 14-yard pass from Jackson Gilkey (Sloan Calder kick), 0:53. Dukes 28–7. Drive: 2 plays, 21 yards 0:44.

Third quarter

- WEB – Sloan Calder 51-yard field goal, 11:03. Dukes 28–10. Drive: 4 plays, 4 yards, 1:00.
- JMU – Morgan Suarez 38-yard field goal, 7:21. Dukes 31–10. Drive: 8 plays, 56 yards, 3:42.

Fourth quarter

- JMU – Wayne Knight 59-yard run (Morgan Suarez kick), 14:51. Dukes 38–10. Drive: 3 plays, 67 yards, 1:02.
- JMU – JC Evans 5-yard run (Morgan Suarez kick), 4:48. Dukes 45–10. Drive: 1 play, 5 yards, 0:06.

Statistics	WEB	JMU
First downs	10	23
Plays–yards	57–148	71–458
Rushes–yards	31–64	44–313
Passing yards	84	145
Passing: Comp–Att–Int	10–26–3	17–27–1
Turnovers	3	2
Time of possession	27:33	32:27

Team	Category	Player	Statistics
Weber State	Passing	Jackson Gilkey	10/24, 84 yards, TD, 3 INT
Weber State	Rushing	Zach Hrbacek	12 carries, 39 yards
Weber State	Receiving	Marcus Chretien	2 receptions, 22 yards
James Madison	Passing	Alonza Barnett III	14/22, 130 yards, TD
James Madison	Rushing	George Pettaway	10 carries, 99 yards
James Madison	Receiving	Michael Scott	4 receptions, 38 yards

=== at Arizona (FBS) ===
Weber State Wildcats (0–1) at Arizona Wildcats (FBS) (1–0) – Game summary

Quarter	1	2	3	4	Total
Weber State	0	0	0	3	3
Arizona (FBS)	24	10	14	0	48

at Arizona Stadium • Tucson, AZ

- Date: September 6
- Game time: 7:00 PM MST
- Game weather: Cloudy • Temperature: 83 °F (28 °C)
- Game attendance: 40,038
- Referee: Tutashinda Salaam
- TV announcers (ESPN+): Ted Emrich (play-by-play) and Jeff Woody (analyst)

Game information

First quarter

- (12:08) ARIZ – Javin Whatley 31-yard pass from Noah Fifita, Michael Salgado-Medina kick (Drive: 6 plays, 75 yards, 2:52; Arizona 7–0)
- (8:56) ARIZ – Javin Whatley 85-yard pass from Noah Fifita, Michael Salgado-Medina kick (Drive: 1 play, 85 yards, 0:12; Arizona 14–0)
- (4:15) ARIZ – Michael Salgado-Medina 32-yard field goal (Drive: 7 plays, 46 yards, 3:43; Arizona 17–0)
- (2:28) ARIZ – Tre Spivey 10-yard pass from Noah Fifita, Michael Salgado-Medina kick (Drive: 2 plays, 12 yards, 0:27; Arizona 24–0)

Second quarter

- (8:51) ARIZ – Michael Salgado-Medina 31-yard field goal (Drive: 14 plays, 74 yards, 6:53; Arizona 27–0)
- (2:16) ARIZ – Brandon Phelps 13-yard pass from Noah Fifita, Michael Salgado-Medina kick (Drive: 7 plays, 81 yards, 3:02; Arizona 34–0)

Third quarter

- (7:44) ARIZ – Ismail Mahdi 27-yard pass from Noah Fifita, Michael Salgado-Medina kick (Drive: 9 plays, 80 yards, 3:47; Arizona 41–0)
- (7:08) ARIZ – Jay'Vion Cole 27-yard interception return, Michael Salgado-Medina kick (Arizona 48–0)

Fourth quarter

- (12:44) WEB – Sloan Calder 33-yard field goal (Drive: 8 plays, 31 yards, 4:02; Arizona 48–3)

Statistics	WEB	ARIZ
First downs	11	31
Plays–yards	55–184	67–556
Rushes–yards	31–116	39–150
Passing yards	68	406
Passing: Comp–Att–Int	10–24–2	20–28–0
Turnovers	2	0
Time of possession	27:21	32:39

Team	Category	Player	Statistics
Weber State	Passing	Jackson Gilkey	10/24, 68 yards, 2 INT
Weber State	Rushing	Jackson Gilkey	9 carries, 40 yards
Weber State	Receiving	Noah Bennee	2 receptions, 20 yards
Arizona	Passing	Noah Fifita	17/22, 373 yards, 5 TD
Arizona	Rushing	Ismail Mahdi	9 carries, 51 yards
Arizona	Receiving	Javin Whatley	5 receptions, 168 yards, 2 TD

=== at McNeese ===
Weber State Wildcats (0–2) at McNeese Cowboys (1–1) – Game summary

Quarter	1	2	3	4	Total
Wildcats	7	14	7	14	42
Cowboys	0	7	14	20	41

at Cowboy Stadium • Lake Charles, LA

- Date: September 13
- Game time: 6:00 PM CDT
- Game weather: Cloudy • Temperature: 92 °F (33 °C) • Wind: SE at 3 miles per hour (4.8 km/h)
- Game attendance: 11,702
- Referee: Gary Leeper
- TV announcers (ESPN+): Jeff Palermo (play-by-play), Chaston Tavares (analyst) and Rylee Eyster (sideline)

Game information

First quarter

- (5:06) WEB – Jayleen Record 78-yard pass from Jackson Gilkey, Sloan Calder kick (Drive: 2 plays, 79 yards, 0:42; Weber State 7–0)

Second quarter

- (14:46) WEB – Jackson Gilkey 50-yard run, Sloan Calder kick (Drive: 5 plays, 66 yards, 1:56; Weber State 14–0)
- (13:23) MCN – Bryce Strong 68-yard run, Fabrizio Pinton kick (Drive: 3 plays, 75 yards, 1:23; Weber State 14–7)
- (0:21) WEB – Sloan Calder 10-yard run, Sloan Calder kick (Drive: 13 plays, 70 yards, 4:38; Weber State 21–7)

Third quarter

- (12:02) MCN – Jonathan Harris 57-yard pass from Jake Strong, Fabrizio Pinton kick (Drive: 4 plays, 75 yards, 1:25; Weber State 21–14)
- (5:48) WEB – Davion Godley 2-yard run, Sloan Calder kick (Drive: 6 plays, 57 yards, 3:14; Weber State 28–14)
- (2:21) MCN – Jake Strong 5-yard run, Fabrizio Pinton kick (Drive: 9 plays, 46 yards, 3:19; Weber State 28–21)

Fourth quarter

- (11:05) WEB – Davion Godley 12-yard run, Sloan Calder kick (Drive: 13 plays, 78 yards, 6:11; Weber State 35–21)
- (9:45) WEB – BJ Carey 0-yard interception, Sloan Calder kick (Weber State 42–21)
- (9:04) MCN – Tre'Vonte Citizen 79-yard run, Fabrizio Pinton kick (Drive: 2 plays, 88 yards, 0:41; Weber State 42–28)
- (4:56) MCN – Jonathan Harris 3-yard pass from Jake Strong, Fabrizio Pinton kick (Drive: 9 plays, 32 yards, 2:45; Weber State 42–35)
- (0:42) MCN – Jake Strong 19-yard run, pass failed (Drive: 8 plays, 82 yards, 1:32; Weber State 42–41)

Statistics	WEB	MCN
First downs	21	21
Plays–yards	69–447	72–537
Rushes–yards	49–229	33–259
Passing yards	218	278
Passing: Comp–Att–Int	11–20–2	20–39–2
Turnovers	2	2
Time of possession	32:43	27:17

Team	Category	Player	Statistics
Weber State	Passing	Jackson Gilkey	11/20, 218 yards, TD, 2 INT
Weber State	Rushing	Jackson Gilkey	15 carries, 114 yards, TD
Weber State	Receiving	Jayleen Record	1 reception, 78 yards, TD
McNeese	Passing	Jake Strong	20/39, 278 yards, 2 TD, 2 INT
McNeese	Rushing	Tre'Vonte Citizen	11 carries, 117 yards, TD
McNeese	Receiving	Jonathan Harris	7 receptions, 114 yards, 2 TD

=== Butler ===
Butler Bulldogs (2–1) at Weber State Wildcats (1–2) – Game summary

Quarter	1	2	3	4	Total
Bulldogs	0	17	0	7	24
Wildcats	13	14	3	8	38

at Stewart Stadium • Ogden, UT

- Date: September 20
- Game time: 7:00 p.m. MDT
- Game weather: Sunny • Temperature: 72 °F (22 °C) • Wind: W at 5 miles per hour (8.0 km/h)
- Game attendance: 6,393
- Referee: Jim Crowley
- TV announcers (ESPN+): Mike Folta (play-by-play) and Riley Jensen (analyst)

Game information

First quarter

- (12:38) WEB – Davion Godley 15-yard run, Sloan Calder kick (Drive: 5 plays, 75 yards, 2:22; Weber State 7–0)
- (5:51) WEB – Sloan Calder 29-yard field goal (Drive: 5 plays, 19 yards, 1:59; Weber State 10–0)
- (0:38) WEB – Sloan Calder 26-yard field goal (Drive: 7 plays, 23 yards, 3:40; Weber State 13–0)

Second quarter

- (10:47) BUT – Ethan Loss 2-yard run, Ryan Short kick (Drive: 10 plays, 75 yards, 4:51; Weber State 13–7)
- (8:54) WEB – AJ Jayroe 20-yard pass from Jackson Gilkey, Sloan Calder kick (Drive: 6 plays, 75 yards, 1:53; Weber State 20–7)
- (4:46) WEB – Ammon Munyer 20-yard pass from Jackson Gilkey, Sloan Calder kick (Drive: 6 plays, 75 yards, 2:11; Weber State 27–7)
- (4:01) BUT – Brady Preston 32-yard pass from Gabe Passini, Ryan Short kick (Drive: 2 plays, 75 yards, 0:45; Weber State 27–14)
- (2:00) BUT – Ryan Short 28-yard field goal (Drive: 4 plays, 2 yards, 0:54; Weber State 27–17)

Third quarter

- (6:44) WEB – Sloan Calder 36-yard field goal (Drive: 6 plays, 16 yards, 2:47; Weber State 30–17)

Fourth quarter

- (14:55) BUT – Gabe Passini 12-yard run, Ryan Short kick (Drive: 5 plays, 65 yards, 2:36; Weber State 30–24)
- (2:54) WEB – Chauncey Sylvester 3-yard run, Marvin Session pass from Jackson Gilkey (Drive: 4 plays, 64 yards, 2:19; Weber State 38–24)

Statistics	BUT	WEB
First downs	13	21
Plays–yards	62–248	66–442
Rushes–yards	37–185	41–257
Passing yards	63	185
Passing: Comp–Att–Int	8–25–1	14–25–2
Turnovers	1	3
Time of possession	28:44	31:16

Team	Category	Player	Statistics
Butler	Passing	Gabe Passini	5/9, 51 yards, TD
Butler	Rushing	Gabe Passini	23 carries, 175 yards, TD
Butler	Receiving	Brady Preston	1 reception, 32 yards, TD
Weber State	Passing	Jackson Gilkey	14/25, 185 yards, 2 TD, 2 INT
Weber State	Rushing	Davion Godley	19 carries, 193 yards, TD
Weber State	Receiving	Marvin Session	4 receptions, 63 yards

=== at No. 9 UC Davis ===
Weber State Wildcats (2–2) at No. 9 UC Davis Aggies (2–1) – Game summary

Quarter	1	2	3	4	Total
Wildcats	0	3	3	6	12
No. 9 Aggies	0	17	3	14	34

at UC Davis Health Stadium • Davis, CA

- Date: September 27
- Game time: 8:00 p.m. MDT
- Game weather: Sunny • Temperature: 70 °F (21 °C)
- Game attendance: 12,238
- Referee: Mike Bezner
- TV announcers (ESPN+): Scott Marsh (play-by-play) and Scott Gordon (analyst)

Game information

First quarter

- No scoring plays.

Second quarter

- (12:13) WEB – Sloan Calder 33-yard field goal (Drive: 13 plays, 51 yards, 6:00; Weber State 3–0)
- (7:07) UCD – Caden Pinnick 2-yard run, Hunter Ridley kick (Drive: 14 plays, 75 yards, 5:06; UC Davis 7–3)
- (3:47) UCD – Carter Vargas 57-yard pass from Caden Pinnick, Hunter Ridley kick (Drive: 3 plays, 57 yards, 1:27; UC Davis 14–3)
- (0:00) UCD – Hunter Ridley 45-yard field goal (Drive: 9 plays, 53 yards, 1:13; UC Davis 17–3)

Third quarter

- (7:44) UCD – Hunter Ridley 25-yard field goal (Drive: 12 plays, 67 yards, 4:31; UC Davis 20–3)
- (3:11) WEB – Sloan Calder 29-yard field goal (Drive: 8 plays, 51 yards, 4:26; UC Davis 20–6)

Fourth quarter

- (13:37) UCD – Rex Connors 2-yard run, Hunter Ridley kick (Drive: 8 plays, 75 yards, 4:34; UC Davis 27–6)
- (8:59) UCD – Samuel Gbatu Jr. 85-yard pass from Caden Pinnick, Hunter Ridley kick (Drive: 2 plays, 87 yards, 0:42; UC Davis 34–6)
- (3:03) WEB – Marcus Chretien 11-yard pass from Dijon Jennings (Drive: 12 plays, 73 yards, 5:51; UC Davis 34–12)

Statistics	WEB	UCD
First downs	17	21
Plays–yards	67–313	66–469
Rushes–yards	43–138	37–175
Passing yards	175	294
Passing: Comp–Att–Int	16–24–0	17–29–0
Turnovers	0	1
Time of possession	34:27	25:33

Team	Category	Player	Statistics
Weber State	Passing	Jackson Gilkey	14/22, 138 yards
Weber State	Rushing	Davion Godley	19 carries, 60 yards
Weber State	Receiving	Marvin Session	3 receptions, 44 yards
UC Davis	Passing	Caden Pinnick	16/27, 288 yards, 2 TD
UC Davis	Rushing	Carter Vargas	8 carries, 55 yards
UC Davis	Receiving	Samuel Gbatu Jr.	4 receptions, 112 yards, TD

=== Sacramento State ===
Sacramento State Hornets (2–3) at Weber State Wildcats (2–3) – Game summary

Quarter	1	2	3	4	Total
Hornets	7	21	7	20	55
Wildcats	3	7	10	7	27

at Stewart Stadium • Ogden, UT

- Date: October 11
- Game time: 6:00 p.m. MDT
- Game attendance: 2,126
- Referee: Jeff Rink
- TV: ESPN+

Game information

First quarter

- CARK – Sloan Calder 52-yard field goal, 5:55. Wildcats 3–0. Drive: 5 plays, 15 yards, 1:20.'
- SAC – Cardell Williams 10-yard run (Grant Meadors kick), 0:55. Hornets 7–3. Drive: 13 plays, 50 yards, 4:53.

Second quarter

- SAC – Rodney Hammond Jr. 14-yard run (Grant Meadors kick), 14:02. Hornets 14–3. Drive: 1 play, 14 yards, 0:04.
- SAC – Cardell Williams 51-yard run (Grant Meadors kick), 11:03. Hornets 21–3. Drive: 6 plays, 71 yards, 2:31.
- WEB – Dijon Jennings 5-yard run (Sloan Calder kick), 5:10. Hornets 21–10. Drive: 13 plays, 75 yards, 5:53.
- SAC – JaQuail Smith 13-yard run (Grant Meadors kick), 0:50. Hornets 28–10. Drive: 8 plays, 82 yards, 4:10.

Third quarter

- SAC – Rodney Hammond Jr. 8-yard run (Grant Meadors kick), 12:01. Hornets 35–10. Drive: 4 plays, 45 yards, 1:33.
- WEB – Sloan Calder 48-yard field goal, 7:30. Hornets 35–13. Drive: 9 plays, 42 yards, 4:25.
- WEB – Chauncey Sylvester 23-yard pass from Dijon Jennings (Sloan Calder kick), 1:37. Hornets 35–20. Drive: 7 plays, 57 yards, 2:17.

Fourth quarter

- SAC – Cardell Williams 3-yard run (Grant Meadors kick failed), 12:17. Hornets 41–20. Drive: 10 plays, 75 yards, 4:20.
- WEB – Chauncey Sylvester 5-yard run (Sloan Calder kick), 8:36. Hornets 41–27. Drive: 8 plays, 80 yards, 3:35.
- SAC – Rodney Hammond Jr. 99-yard kickoff return (Grant Meadors kick), 8:21. Hornets 48–27.
- SAC – JaQuail Smith 24-yard run (Grant Meadors kick), 2:46. Hornets 55–27. Drive: 6 plays, 51 yards, 3:14.

Statistics	SAC	WEB
First downs	22	19
Plays–yards	60–460	69–301
Rushes–yards	50–397	41–144
Passing yards	63	157
Passing: Comp–Att–Int	6–10–0	16–28–0
Turnovers	0	0
Time of possession	28:58	31:02

Team	Category	Player	Statistics
Sacramento State	Passing	Cardell Williams	5/9, 53 yards
Sacramento State	Rushing	Cardell Williams	12 carries, 139 yards, 3 TD
Sacramento State	Receiving	Rodney Hammond Jr.	1 reception, 25 yards
Weber State	Passing	Dijon Jennings	16/28, 157 yards, TD
Weber State	Rushing	Chauncey Sylvester	17 carries, 83 yards, TD
Weber State	Receiving	Chauncey Sylvester	4 receptions, 54 yards, TD

=== at Portland State ===
Weber State Wildcats (2–4) at Portland State Vikings (0–6) – Game summary

Quarter	1	2	3	4	Total
Wildcats	9	3	17	14	43
Vikings	3	3	0	21	27

at Hillsboro Stadium • Hillsboro, OR

- Date: October 18
- Game time: 3:05 p.m. MDT
- Game weather: Cloudy • Temperature: 60 °F (16 °C) • Wind: E at 2 miles per hour (3.2 km/h)
- Game attendance: 1,489
- Referee: Gregg Wilson
- TV: ESPN+

Game information

First quarter

- WEB – Sloan Calder 48-yard field goal, 12:01. Wildcats 3–0. Drive: 5 plays, 49 yards, 1:15.
- WEB – Ishaan Daniels 20-yard interception return (Sloan Calder kick BLOCKED), 11:16. Wildcats 9–0.
- PRST – Mathias Uribe 27-yard field goal, 4:33. Wildcats 9–3. Drive: 13 plays, 63 yards, 6:37.

Second quarter

- PRST – Mathias Uribe 36-yard field goal, 11:02. Wildcats 9–6. Drive: 8 plays, 40 yards, 3:11.
- WEB – Sloan Calder 34-yard field goal, 0:06. Wildcats 12–6. Drive: 7 plays, 36 yards, 1:11.

Third quarter

- WEB – Chauncey Sylvester 1-yard run (Sloan Calder kick), 10:06. Wildcats 19–6. Drive: 9 plays, 78 yards, 4:47.
- WEB – Sloan Calder 44-yard field goal, 6:08. Wildcats 22–6. Drive: 7 plays, 14 yards, 3:42.
- WEB – Zach Hrbacek 5-yard run (Sloan Calder kick), 4:15. Wildcats 29–6. Drive: 3 plays, 16 yards, 1:17.

Fourth quarter

- PRST – Tyrese Smith 15-yard run (Mathias Uribe kick), 14:00. Wildcats 29–13. Drive: 11 plays, 75 yards, 5:15.
- WEB – Will Way 1-yard run (Sloan Calder kick), 8:52. Wildcats 36–13. Drive: 1 play, 1 yard, 0:10.
- WEB – Spencer Ferguson 24-yard run (Sloan Calder kick), 5:00. Wildcats 43–13. Drive: 4 plays, 34 yards, 2:17.
- PRST – Tyrese Smith 4-yard run (Mathias Uribe kick), 2:53. Wildcats 43–20. Drive: 6 plays, 75 yards, 2:07.
- PRST – Zachary Dodson-Greene 14-yard pass from Tyrese Smith (Mathias Uribe kick), 0:33. Wildcats 43–27. Drive: 5 plays, 71 yards, 1:09.

Statistics	WEB	PRST
First downs	18	17
Plays–yards	66–370	70–378
Rushes–yards	41–220	33–65
Passing yards	150	313
Passing: Comp–Att–Int	15–25–1	21–37–4
Turnovers	1	5
Time of possession	30:46	29:14

Team	Category	Player	Statistics
Weber State	Passing	Dijon Jennings	13/19, 123 yards, INT
Weber State	Rushing	Chauncey Sylvester	19 carries, 135 yards, TD
Weber State	Receiving	Marvin Session	3 receptions, 58 yards
Portland State	Passing	Tyrese Smith	9/14, 170 yards, TD, INT
Portland State	Rushing	Tyrese Smith	7 carries, 38 yards, 2 TD
Portland State	Receiving	Andre Miller	4 receptions, 82 yards

=== Eastern Washington ===
Eastern Washington Eagles (3–4) at Weber State Wildcats (3–4) – Game summary

Quarter	1	2	3	4	Total
Eagles	9	14	0	0	23
Wildcats	7	7	3	3	20

at Stewart Stadium • Ogden, UT

- Date: October 25
- Game time: 1:00 p.m. MDT
- Game weather: Cloudy Temperature: 66 °F (19 °C) • Wind: SW at 6 miles per hour (9.7 km/h)
- Game attendance: 3,682
- Referee: John Nardi
- TV announcers (ESPN+): Tony Parks (play-by-play) and Riley Jensen (analyst)

Game information

First quarter

- WEB – Davion Godley 34-yard run (Sloan Calder kick), 13:49. Wildcats 7–0. Drive: 3 plays, 75 yards, 1:11.
- EWU – Jared Taylor 2-yard run (Soren McKee kick), 12:49. Tied 7–7. Drive: 1 play, 2 yards, 0:06.
- EWU – Team safety, 3:24. Eagles 9–7.

Second quarter

- WEB – Chauncey Sylvester 5-yard run (Sloan Calder kick), 9:34. Wildcats 14–9. Drive: 7 plays, 60 yards, 3:22.
- EWU – Jaxon Branch 7-yard pass from Nate Bell (Soren McKee kick), 4:32. Eagles 16–14. Drive: 10 plays, 75 yards, 5:02.
- EWU – Jared Taylor 2-yard run (Soren McKee kick), 0:31. Eagles 23–14. Drive: 7 plays, 65 yards, 2:10.

Third quarter

- WEB – Sloan Calder 38-yard field goal, 5:57. Eagles 23–17. Drive: 6 plays, 44 yards, 2:53.

Fourth quarter

- WEB – Sloan Calder 37-yard field goal, 6:23. Eagles 23–20. Drive: 14 plays, 55 yards, 5:25.

Statistics	EWU	WEB
First downs	16	16
Plays–yards	69–199	61–345
Rushes–yards	40–30	34–205
Passing yards	169	140
Passing: Comp–Att–Int	20–29–0	17–27–2
Turnovers	0	3
Time of possession	32:41	27:19

Team	Category	Player	Statistics
Eastern Washington	Passing	Nate Bell	20/29, 169 yards, TD
Eastern Washington	Rushing	Jared Taylor	11 carries, 23 yards, 2 TD
Eastern Washington	Receiving	Noah Cronquist	5 receptions, 66 yards
Weber State	Passing	Dijon Jennings	17/27, 140 yards, 2 INT
Weber State	Rushing	Davion Godley	8 carries, 95 yards, TD
Weber State	Receiving	Jayleen Record	5 receptions, 46 yards

=== No. 3 Montana ===
No. 3 Montana Grizzlies (8–0) at Weber State Wildcats (3–5) – Game summary

Quarter	1	2	3	4	Total
No. 3 Grizzlies	21	10	0	7	38
Wildcats	3	7	7	0	17

at Stewart Stadium • Ogden, UT

- Date: November 1
- Game time: 1:00 p.m. MDT
- Game attendance: 5,095
- Referee: Kelly Holman
- TV: ESPN+

Game information

First quarter

- MONT – Brooks Davis 12-yard run (Ty Morrison kick), 13:48. Grizzlies 7–0. Drive: 3 plays, 34 yards, 1:04.
- WEB – Sloan Calder 29-yard field goal, 6:50. Grizzlies 7–3. Drive: 11 plays, 64 yards, 6:58.
- MONT – Blake Bohannon 62-yard pass from Keali'i Ah Yat (Ty Morrison kick), 5:34. Grizzlies 14–3. Drive: 3 plays, 75 yards, 1:16.
- MONT – Keali'i Ah Yat 2-yard run (Ty Morrison kick), 1:34. Grizzlies 21–3. Drive: 7 plays, 64 yards, 2:56.

Second quarter

- MONT – Eli Gillman 14-yard run (Ty Morrison kick), 12:10. Grizzlies 28–3. Drive: 4 plays, 84 yards, 1:08.
- WEB – Jayleen Record 11-yard pass from Dijon Jennings (Sloan Calder kick), 3:39. Grizzlies 28–10. Drive: 15 plays, 77 yards, 8:25.
- MONT – Ty Morrison 33-yard field goal, 0:01. Grizzlies 31–10. Drive: 7 plays, 47 yards, 0:45.

Third quarter

- WEB – Jayleen Record 18-yard pass from Kingston Tisdell (Sloan Calder kick), 3:20. Grizzlies 31–17. Drive: 6 plays, 43 yards, 2:44.

Fourth quarter

- MONT – Evan Shafer 9-yard pass from Keali'i Ah Yat (Ty Morrison kick), 14:55. Grizzlies 38–17. Drive: 10 plays, 75 yards, 3:25.

Statistics	MONT	WEB
First downs	24	21
Plays–yards	70–522	75–327
Rushes–yards	35–193	33–114
Passing yards	329	213
Passing: Comp–Att–Int	18–35–0	25–42–1
Turnovers	0	2
Time of possession	25:08	34:52

Team	Category	Player	Statistics
Montana	Passing	Keali'i Ah Yat	15/27, 296 yards, 2 TD
Montana	Rushing	Eli Gillman	12 carries, 122 yards, TD
Montana	Receiving	Blake Bohannon	3 receptions, 131 yards, TD
Weber State	Passing	Kingston Tisdell	10/21, 116 yards, TD
Weber State	Rushing	Colter May	19 carries, 74 yards
Weber State	Receiving	Jayleen Record	8 receptions, 107 yards, 2 TD

=== at No. 3 Montana State ===
Weber State Wildcats (3-6) at No. 3 Montana State Bobcats (7-2) – Game summary

Quarter	1	2	3	4	Total
Wildcats	0	7	0	7	14
No. 3 Bobcats	14	17	21	14	66

at Bobcat Stadium • Bozeman, MT

- Date: November 8
- Game weather: Sunny, 43 °F (6 °C)
- Game attendance: 21,467
- Referee: Spencer Mumford
- TV: ESPN+

Game information

First quarter

- MTST – Justin Lamson 5-yard run (Myles Sansted kick), 6:20. Bobcats 7–0. Drive: 10 plays, 47 yards, 4:22.
- MTST – Julius Davis 52-yard run (Myles Sansted kick), 0:23. Bobcats 14–0. Drive: 1 play, 52 yards, 0:10.

Second quarter

- MTST – Adam Jones 2-yard run (Myles Sansted kick), 9:30. Bobcats 21–0. Drive: 10 plays, 67 yards, 5:20.
- MTST – Rocky Lencioni 4-yard pass from Justin Lamson (Myles Sansted kick), 6:31. Bobcats 28–0. Drive: 4 plays, 20 yards, 1:26.
- WEB – Spencer Ferguson 4-yard run (Sloan Calder kick), 0:35. Bobcats 28–7. Drive: 12 plays, 81 yards, 5:56.
- MTST – Myles Sansted 48-yard field goal, 0:04. Bobcats 31–7. Drive: 3 plays, 0 yards, 0:24.

Third quarter

- MTST – Ryan King 9-yard pass from Justin Lamson (Myles Sansted kick), 10:45. Bobcats 38–7. Drive: 8 plays, 75 yards, 4:15.
- MTST – Julius Davis 1-yard run (Myles Sansted kick), 6:42. Bobcats 45–7. Drive: 5 plays, 37 yards, 2:21.
- MTST – Justin Lamson 12-yard run (Myles Sansted kick), 4:45. Bobcats 52–7. Drive: 1 play, 12 yards, 0:07.

Fourth quarter

- MTST – Jordan Reed 25-yard pass from Patrick Duchien (Myles Sansted kick), 14:30. Bobcats 59–7. Drive: 4 plays, 74 yards, 1:51.
- WEB – Mason York 5-yard pass from Dijon Jennings (Sloan Calder kick), 8:26. Bobcats 59–14. Drive: 11 plays, 62 yards, 6:04.
- MTST – Chance Wilson 15-yard run (Myles Sansted kick), 1:35. Bobcats 66–14. Drive: 8 plays, 60 yards, 2:37.

Statistics	WEB	MTST
First downs	12	29
Plays–yards	64–285	62–452
Rushes–yards	35–178	40–269
Passing yards	107	183
Passing: Comp–Att–Int	17–29–2	17–22–0
Turnovers	4	2
Time of possession	31:49	28:11

Team	Category	Player	Statistics
Weber State	Passing	Dijon Jennings	12/18, 85 yards, TD, INT
Weber State	Rushing	Spencer Ferguson	22 carries, 88 yards, TD
Weber State	Receiving	Marvin Session	5 receptions, 65 yards
Montana State	Passing	Justin Lamson	12/16, 117 yards, 2 TD
Montana State	Rushing	Julius Davis	10 carries, 114 yards, 2 TD
Montana State	Receiving	Taco Dowler	2 receptions, 28 yards

=== at Idaho State ===
Weber State Wildcats (3–7) at Idaho State Bengals (4–6) – Game summary

Quarter	1	2	3	4	Total
Wildcats	0	0	0	3	3
Bengals	7	14	10	0	31

at ICCU Dome • Pocatello, ID

- Date: November 15
- Game time: 4:00 p.m. MST
- Game weather: none (played indoors)
- Game attendance: 7,367
- Referee: John Doe
- TV: ESPN+

Game information

First quarter

- IDST – Jordan Cooke 2-yard run (Trajan Sinatra kick), 12:51. Bengals 7–0. Drive: 5 plays, 75 yards, 2:09.

Second quarter

- IDST – Dason Brooks 3-yard run (Trajan Sinatra kick), 13:11. Bengals 14–0. Drive: 5 plays, 80 yards, 1:49.
- IDST – Damien Morgan 29-yard pass from Jordan Cooke (Trajan Sinatra kick), 2:11. Bengals 21–0. Drive: 9 plays, 75 yards, 4:20.

Third quarter

- IDST – Trajan Sinatra 48-yard field goal, 6:46. Bengals 24–0. Drive: 10 plays, 39 yards, 4:06.
- IDST – Ian Duarte 11-yard pass from Jordan Cooke (Trajan Sinatra kick), 2:44. Bengals 31–0. Drive: 6 plays, 67 yards, 2:57.

Fourth quarter

- WEB – Sloan Calder 25-yard field goal, 10:19. Bengals 31–3. Drive: 14 plays, 67 yards, 7:25.

Statistics	WEB	IDST
First downs	11	27
Plays–yards	56–227	68–531
Rushes–yards	23–35	28–158
Passing yards	192	373
Passing: Comp–Att–Int	24–33–0	25–40–0
Turnovers	0	0
Time of possession	29:20	30:40

Team	Category	Player	Statistics
Weber State	Passing	Dijon Jennings	24/33, 192 yards
Weber State	Rushing	Dijon Jennings	10 carries, 22 yards
Weber State	Receiving	Robert Young	4 receptions, 39 yards
Idaho State	Passing	Jordan Cooke	24/39, 363 yards, 2 TD
Idaho State	Rushing	Jordan Cooke	11 carries, 65 yards, TD
Idaho State	Receiving	Damien Morgan	8 receptions, 122 yards, TD

=== No. 23 Northern Arizona ===
No. 23 Northern Arizona Lumberjacks (7–4) at Weber State Wildcats (3–8) – Game summary

Quarter	1	2	3	4	Total
No. 23 Lumberjacks	14	7	0	7	28
Wildcats	14	10	10	14	48

at Stewart Stadium • Ogden, UT

- Date: November 22
- Game time: 1:00 p.m. MST
- Game weather: Sunny • Temperature: 47 °F (8 °C) • Wind: NW at 3 miles per hour (4.8 km/h)
- Game attendance: 3,149
- Referee: Gregg Wilson
- TV: ESPN+

Game information

First quarter

- WEB – Colter May 24-yard run (Sloan Calder kick), 12:03. Wildcats 7–0. Drive: 6 plays, 75 yards, 2:57.
- NAU – Isaiah Eastman 10-yard run (Samuel Hunsaker kick), 9:57. Tied 7–7. Drive: 5 plays, 44 yards, 2:05.
- WEB – Spencer Ferguson 50-yard run (Sloan Calder kick), 4:50. Wildcats 14–7. Drive: 1 play, 50 yards, 0:10.
- NAU – Kolbe Katsis 74-yard pass from Ty Pennington (Samuel Hunsaker kick), 4:31. Tied 14–14. Drive: 1 play, 74 yards, 0:12.

Second quarter

- WEB – Spencer Ferguson 16-yard pass from Kingston Tisdell (Sloan Calder kick), 8:29. Wildcats 21–14. Drive: 7 plays, 58 yards, 3:18.
- WEB – Sloan Calder 27-yard field goal, 1:47. Wildcats 24–14. Drive: 9 plays, 57 yards, 4:13.
- NAU – Mikale Greer 42-yard interception return (Samuel Hunsaker kick), 0:34. Wildcats 24–21.

Third quarter

- WEB – Marvin Session 61-yard pass from Kingston Tisdell (Sloan Calder kick), 8:13. Wildcats 31–21. Drive: 3 plays, 61 yards, 1:36.
- WEB – Sloan Calder 26-yard field goal, 3:57. Wildcats 34–21. Drive: 8 plays, 21 yards, 3:19.

Fourth quarter

- WEB – Colter May 28-yard run (Sloan Calder kick), 10:58. Wildcats 41–21. Drive: 6 plays, 64 yards, 3:51.
- NAU – Isaiah Eastman 7-yard pass from Ty Pennington (Samuel Hunsaker kick), 7:00. Wildcats 41–28. Drive: 12 plays, 75 yards, 3:58.
- WEB – Bird Butler 8-yard run (Sloan Calder kick), 2:19. Wildcats 48–28. Drive: 2 plays, 5 yards, 0:16.

Statistics	NAU	WEB
First downs	12	19
Plays–yards	65–303	67–474
Rushes–yards	25–53	29–197
Passing yards	250	277
Passing: Comp–Att–Int	21–40–1	26–38–1
Turnovers	1	1
Time of possession	28:04	31:56

Team	Category	Player	Statistics
Northern Arizona	Passing	Ty Pennington	21/39, 250 yards, 2 TD, INT
Northern Arizona	Rushing	Ty Pennington	11 carries, 18 yards
Northern Arizona	Receiving	Kolbe Katsis	8 receptions, 135 yards, TD
Weber State	Passing	Kingston Tisdell	26/38, 277 yards, 2 TD, INT
Weber State	Rushing	Spencer Ferguson	11 carries, 102 yards, TD
Weber State	Receiving	Marvin Session	3 receptions, 84 yards, TD
