= Ty Pennington (American football) =

American football quarterback (born 2004)

No. 6 – Northern Arizona Lumberjacks
- Position: Quarterback
- Class: Senior

Personal information
- Born: May 20, 2004 (age 22)
- Listed height: 6 ft 2 in (1.88 m)
- Listed weight: 220 lb (100 kg)

Career information
- High school: Charles Page (Sand Springs, Oklahoma)
- College: Pittsburg State (2022–2023); Northern Arizona (2024–present)

Awards and highlights
- Big Sky Newcomer of the Year (2024)
- Stats at ESPN

Ty Pennington (born May 20, 2004) is an American football quarterback for the Northern Arizona Lumberjacks.

== Early life and high school ==
Pennington grew up in Sand Springs, Oklahoma and attended Charles Page High School. He passed for 2,831 yards and 27 touchdowns as a senior and was named Class 6A All-District MVP. Pennington committed to play college football at Pittsburg State.

== College career ==
Pennington began his college football career at Pittsburg State and redshirted his true freshman season. As a redshirt freshman, he played in 13 games and passed for 447 yards with six touchdowns and one interception while also rushing for 359 yards and four touchdowns. After the season, Pennington entered the NCAA transfer portal.

Pennington transferred to Northern Arizona. In his first season with the Northern Arizona Lumberjacks he was named the Big Sky Conference Newcomer of the Year after completing 187 of 287 pass attempts for 2,288 yards and 13 touchdowns with two interceptions and also rushed for seven touchdowns. Pennington passed for 3,116 yards and 19 touchdowns with four interceptions as a redshirt junior.
