= 2025 Northern Colorado Bears football team =

American college football season

2025 Northern Colorado Bears football
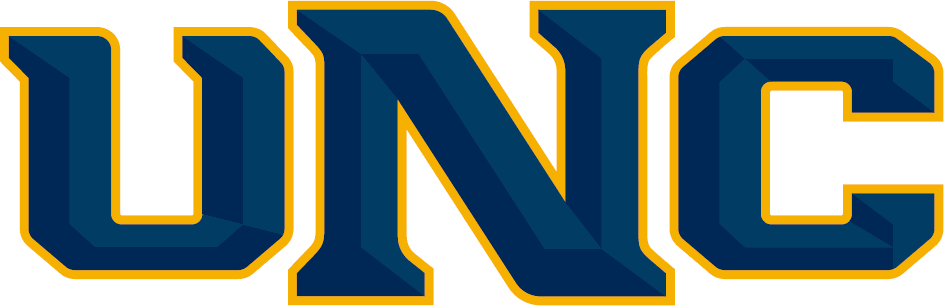
- Conference: Big Sky Conference
- Record: 4–8 (2–6 Big Sky)
- Head coach: Ed Lamb (3rd season)
- Offensive coordinator: Justin Walterscheid (2nd season)
- Defensive coordinator: Preston Hadley (3rd season)
- Home stadium: Nottingham Field

2025 Big Sky Conference football standings
	Conf.			Overall
Team	W		L	W		L
No. 1 Montana State $^	8	–	0	14	–	2
No. 3 Montana ^	7	–	1	13	–	2
No. 8 UC Davis ^	6	–	2	9	–	4
Sacramento State	5	–	3	7	–	5
Idaho State	5	–	3	6	–	6
Northern Arizona	4	–	4	7	–	5
Eastern Washington	4	–	4	5	–	7
Cal Poly	2	–	6	4	–	8
Idaho	2	–	6	4	–	8
Northern Colorado	2	–	6	4	–	8
Weber State	2	–	6	4	–	8
Portland State	1	–	7	1	–	11
$ – Conference champion; ^ – FCS playoff participant; Rankings from STATS Poll

The 2025 Northern Colorado Bears football team represented the University of Northern Colorado as a member of the Big Sky Conference during the 2025 NCAA Division I FCS football season. The Bears were led by third-year head coach Ed Lamb and played at Nottingham Field in Greeley, Colorado.

== Schedule ==
Date	Time	Opponent	Site	TV	Result	Attendance
August 30	1:00 p.m.	Chadron State*	Nottingham Field; Greeley, CO	ESPN+	W 17–3	4,153
September 6	5:00 p.m.	at Colorado State*	Canvas Stadium; Fort Collins, CO	Altitude	L 17–23	37,023
September 13	12:00 p.m.	at No. 12 South Dakota*	DakotaDome; Vermillion, SD	ESPN+	L 17–24 ^{OT}	6,445
September 20	5:00 p.m.	at Houston Christian*	Husky Stadium; Houston, TX	ESPN+	W 26–23 ^{OT}	1,249
September 27	1:00 p.m.	Idaho State^{†}	Nottingham Field; Greeley, CO	ESPN+	L 18–26	5,386
October 11	3:00 p.m.	at No. 11 Idaho	Kibbie Dome; Moscow, ID	ESPN+	W 49–33	12,902
October 18	7:00 p.m.	at Sacramento State	Hornet Stadium; Sacramento, CA	ESPN+	L 35–40	20,022
October 25	1:00 p.m.	No. 6 UC Davis	Nottingham Field; Greeley, CO	ESPN+	L 16–27	4,412
November 1	12:00 p.m.	No. 4т Montana State	Nottingham Field; Greeley, CO	ESPN+	L 7–55	4,092
November 8	4:00 p.m.	at Northern Arizona	Walkup Skydome; Flagstaff, AZ	ESPN+	L 10–49	8,010
November 15	2:00 p.m.	at Eastern Washington	Roos Field; Cheney, WA	ESPN+	L 7–27	4,300
November 22	12:00 p.m.	Portland State	Nottingham Field; Greeley, CO	ESPN+	W 24–13	2,902
*Non-conference game; ^{†}Homecoming; Rankings from STATS Poll released prior to the game; All times are in Mountain time

== Game summaries ==
=== Chadron State (DII) ===
Chadron State Eagles (DII) (0–0) at Northern Colorado Bears (0–0) – Game summary

Quarter	1	2	3	4	Total
Eagles (DII)	0	0	3	0	3
Bears	14	0	0	3	17

at Nottingham Field • Greeley, CO

- Date: August 30
- Game time: 1:00 p.m. MDT
- Game weather: Cloudy • Temperature: 75 °F (24 °C) • Wind: NE at 3 miles per hour (4.8 km/h)
- Game attendance: 4,153
- Referee: Mike Bezner
- TV: ESPN+

Game information

First quarter

- (10:36) UNC – Brayden Munroe 60-yard pass from Peter Costelli, Jacob Willig kick (Drive: 4 plays, 80 yards, 2:14; Northern Colorado 7–0)
- (0:10) UNC – Peter Costelli 19-yard run, Jacob Willig kick (Drive: 14 plays, 91 yards, 7:04; Northern Colorado 14–0)

Second quarter

- No scoring plays.

Third quarter

- (8:58) CHA – Wilson Yee 29-yard field goal (Drive: 12 plays, 62 yards, 6:02; Northern Colorado 14–3)

Fourth quarter

- (12:21) UNC – Jacob Willig 39-yard field goal (Drive: 12 plays, 68 yards, 6:46; Northern Colorado 17–3)

Statistics	CHA	UNCO
First downs	21	19
Plays–yards	64–333	51–291
Rushes–yards	31–105	36–160
Passing yards	228	131
Passing: Comp–Att–Int	20–33–1	9–15–0
Turnovers	1	0
Time of possession	31:22	28:38

Team	Category	Player	Statistics
Chadron State	Passing	DJ Ralph	20/33, 228 yards, INT
Chadron State	Rushing	Quincey Ryker	14 carries, 47 yards
Chadron State	Receiving	Tommy Thomas	7 receptions, 100 yards
Northern Colorado	Passing	Peter Costelli	6/10, 92 yards, TD
Northern Colorado	Rushing	Mathias Price	16 carries, 73 yards
Northern Colorado	Receiving	Brayden Munroe	2 receptions, 69 yards, TD

=== at Colorado State (FBS) ===
Northern Colorado Bears (1–0) at Colorado State Rams (FBS) (0–1) – Game summary

Quarter	1	2	3	4	Total
Bears	7	3	7	0	17
Rams (FBS)	0	0	14	7	21

at Canvas Stadium • Fort Collins, CO

- Date: September 6, 2025
- Game time: 5:00 p.m.
- Game attendance: 37,023
- Referee: Patrick Foy
- TV announcers (Altitude): Brian Roth (play-by-play) and Sed Bonner (analyst)

Game information

First quarter

- UNCO – Kia'i Keone 1-yard run (Jacob Willig kick), 6:37. Bears 7–0. Drive: 7 plays, 39 yards, 3:26.

Second quarter

- UNCO – Jacob Willig 23-yard field goal, 7:12. Bears 10–0. Drive: 4 plays, 6 yards, 1:47.

Third quarter

- CSU – Lloyd Avant 2-yard run (Isaiah Hankins kick), 13:23. Bears 10–7. Drive: 2 plays, 12 yards, 0:51.
- UNCO – Aliou-Rocco Traore 1-yard run (Jacob Willig kick), 7:14. Bears 17–7. Drive: 13 plays, 75 yards, 6:09.
- CSU – Lloyd Avant 6-yard run (Isaiah Hankins kick), 1:25. Bears 17–14. Drive: 11 plays, 75 yards, 5:49.

Fourth quarter

- CSU – Brayden Fowler-Nicolosi 13-yard run (Isaiah Hankins kick), 0:44. Rams 21–17. Drive: 13 plays, 77 yards, 3:05.

Statistics	UNCO	CSU
First downs	17	27
Plays–yards	62–223	72–371
Rushes–yards	34–63	46–230
Passing yards	160	141
Passing: Comp–Att–Int	17–28–1	14–26–1
Turnovers	2	5
Time of possession	29:23	30:37

Team	Category	Player	Statistics
Northern Colorado	Passing	Eric Gibson Jr.	17/28, 160 yards, INT
Northern Colorado	Rushing	Justin Guin	11 carries, 38 yards
Northern Colorado	Receiving	Carver Cheeks	5 receptions, 54 yards
Colorado State	Passing	Brayden Fowler-Nicolosi	13/25, 132 yards, INT
Colorado State	Rushing	Lloyd Avant	11 carries, 68 yards, 2 TD
Colorado State	Receiving	Armani Winfield	4 receptions, 49 yards

=== at No. 12 South Dakota ===
Northern Colorado Bears (1–1) at No. 12 South Dakota Coyotes (0–2) – Game summary

Quarter	1	2	3	4	OT	Total
Bears	0	6	0	11	0	17
No. 12 Coyotes	3	7	0	7	7	24

at DakotaDome • Vermillion, SD

- Date: September 13
- Game time: 1:00 PM CDT
- Game weather: Indoors; 72 °F (22 °C)
- Game attendance: 6,445
- Referee: Carl Chapman
- TV announcers (ESPN+): Jay Elsen (play-by-play) and Andre Fields (analyst)

Game information

First quarter

- (0:39) SDAK – Will Leyland 23-yard field goal (Drive: 10 plays, 87 yards, 5:08; SDAK 3–0)

Second quarter

- (7:29) UNCO – Jacob Willig 33-yard field goal (Drive: 14 plays, 57 yards, 8:03; Tied 3–3)
- (3:55) UNCO – Jacob Willig 19-yard field goal (Drive: 6 plays, 21 yards, 2:28; UNCO 6–3)
- (1:38) SDAK – L. J. Phillips Jr. 1-yard run, Will Leyland kick (Drive: 7 plays, 80 yards, 2:12; SDAK 10–6)

Third quarter

- No scoring plays.

Fourth quarter

- (9:24) SDAK – Zach Witte 12-yard pass from Aidan Bouman, Will Leyland kick (Drive: 14 plays, 99 yards, 8:08; SDAK 17–6)
- (5:07) UNCO – Charles Garrison 24-yard pass from Eric Gibson, Brayden Munroe pass to Eric Gibson Jr. for two-point conversion (Drive: 8 plays, 77 yards, 4:10; SDAK 17–14)
- (0:03) UNCO – Jacob Willig 18-yard field goal (Drive: 11 plays, 70 yards, 1:57; Tied 17–17)

Overtime

- SDAK – L.J. Phillips Jr. 13-yard run, Will Leyland kick (Drive: 3 plays, 25 yards; SDAK 24–17)

Statistics	UNCO	SDAK
First downs	20	23
Plays–yards	72–427	66–406
Rushes–yards	32–91	47–307
Passing yards	336	99
Passing: Comp–Att–Int	28–40–0	7–19–1
Turnovers	0	1
Time of possession	30:57	29:03

Team	Category	Player	Statistics
Northern Colorado	Passing	Eric Gibson Jr.	28/39, 336 yards, TD
Northern Colorado	Rushing	Brandon Johnson	14 carries, 46 yards
Northern Colorado	Receiving	Charles Garrison	7 receptions, 112 yards, TD
South Dakota	Passing	Aidan Bouman	7/19, 99 yards, TD, INT
South Dakota	Rushing	L. J. Phillips Jr.	35 carries, 301 yards, 2 TD
South Dakota	Receiving	Jack Martens	2 receptions, 32 yards

=== at Houston Christian ===
Northern Colorado Bears (1–2) at Houston Christian Huskies (1–2) – Game summary

Quarter	1	2	3	4	OT	Total
Bears	7	10	3	0	6	26
Huskies	7	7	3	3	3	23

at Husky Stadium • Houston, TX

- Date: September 20
- Game time: 6:00 p.m. CDT
- Game weather: Sunny • Temperature: 87 °F (31 °C) • Wind: N at 5 miles per hour (8.0 km/h)
- Game attendance: 1,249
- Referee: Matt Beck
- TV announcers (ESPN+): Christian Saez (play-by-play) and Matthew Galtor (analyst)

Game information

First quarter

- (10:43) HCU – Rodney Dansby 37-yard interception return, Charlie Weinrich kick (Houston Christian 7–0)
- (4:41) UNCO – Carver Cheeks 6-yard pass from Eric Gibson, Jacob Willig kick (Drive: 12 plays, 75 yards, 6:02; Tied 7–7)

Second quarter

- (10:36) UNCO – Jacob Willig 48-yard field goal (Drive: 6 plays, 16 yards, 3:02; Northern Colorado 10–7)
- (7:31) UNCO – Mathias Price 6-yard run, Jacob Willig kick (Drive: 2 plays, 14 yards, 0:26; Northern Colorado 17–7)
- (0:29) HCU – Tyran Chappell 82-yard interception return, Charlie Weinrich kick (Northern Colorado 17–14)

Third quarter

- (6:16) UNCO – Jacob Willig 27-yard field goal (Drive: 12 plays, 59 yards, 7:20; Northern Colorado 20–14)
- (4:21) HCU – Charlie Weinrich 46-yard field goal (Drive: 8 plays, 47 yards, 1:55; Northern Colorado 20–17)

Fourth quarter

- (2:47) HCU – Charlie Weinrich 50-yard field goal (Drive: 4 plays, 6 yards, 0:45; Tied 20–20)

Overtime

- HCU – Charlie Weinrich 37-yard field goal (Drive: 4 plays, 7 yards, 0:00; Houston Christian 23–20)
- UNCO – Hank Gibbs 1-yard run (Drive: 6 plays, 25 yards, 0:00; Northern Colorado 26–23)

Statistics	UNCO	HCU
First downs	24	8
Plays–yards	91–437	58–200
Rushes–yards	54–222	23–40
Passing yards	215	160
Passing: Comp–Att–Int	24–37–2	17–35–0
Turnovers	3	1
Time of possession	38:25	21:35

Team	Category	Player	Statistics
Northern Colorado	Passing	Eric Gibson	24/37, 215 yards, TD, 2 INT
Northern Colorado	Rushing	Mathias Price	27 carries, 126 yards, TD
Northern Colorado	Receiving	Carver Cheeks	8 receptions, 101 yards, TD
Houston Christian	Passing	Jake Weir	17/35, 160 yards
Houston Christian	Rushing	Xai'Shaun Edwards	9 carries, 28 yards
Houston Christian	Receiving	Ja'Ryan Wallace	3 receptions, 44 yards

=== Idaho State ===
Idaho State Bengals (1–3) at Northern Colorado Bears (2–2) – Game summary

Quarter	1	2	3	4	Total
Bengals	10	13	3	0	26
Bears	0	7	8	3	18

at Nottingham Field • Greeley, CO

- Date: September 27
- Game time: 1:00 p.m. MDT
- Game attendance: 5,386
- Referee: Spencer Mumford
- TV: ESPN+

Game information

First quarter

- IDST – Trajan Sinatra 26-yard field goal, 9:59. Bengals 3–0. Drive: 13 plays, 66 yards, 5:01.
- IDST – Carson Sudbury 6-yard run (Trajan Sinatra kick), 6:36. Bengals 10–0. Drive: 7 plays, 31 yards, 1:31.

Second quarter

- IDST – Trajan Sinatra 27-yard field goal, 13:09. Bengals 13–0. Drive: 16 plays, 65 yards, 5:29.
- IDST – Trajan Sinatra 49-yard field goal, 7:34. Bengals 16–0. Drive: 8 plays, 43 yards, 2:10.
- UNCO – Charles Garrison 36-yard pass from Eric Gibson Jr. (Jacob Willig kick), 2:12. Bengals 16–7. Drive: 6 plays, 95 yards, 1:43.
- IDST – Tsion Nunnally 33-yard pass from Jordan Cooke (Trajan Sinatra kick), 0:02. Bengals 23–7. Drive: 4 plays, 80 yards, 0:37.

Third quarter

- UNCO – Carver Cheeks 9-yard pass from Eric Gibson Jr. (Eric Gibson Jr. pass to Dawson Menegatti), 4:59. Bengals 23–15. Drive: 9 plays, 66 yards, 3:35.
- IDST – Trajan Sinatra 48-yard field goal, 2:10. Bengals 26–15. Drive: 7 plays, 63 yards, 2:46.

Fourth quarter

- UNCO – Jacob Willig 29-yard field goal, 4:34. Bengals 26–18. Drive: 7 plays, 68 yards, 2:09.

Statistics	IDST	UNCO
First downs	25	16
Plays–yards	84–539	67–426
Rushes–yards	43–289	28–30
Passing yards	250	396
Passing: Comp–Att–Int	14–41–0	26–39–0
Turnovers	1	1
Time of possession	32:57	27:03

Team	Category	Player	Statistics
Idaho State	Passing	Jordan Cooke	12/33, 209 yards, TD
Idaho State	Rushing	Dason Brooks	26 carries, 161 yards
Idaho State	Receiving	Michael Shulikov	2 receptions, 77 yards
Northern Colorado	Passing	Eric Gibson Jr.	26/39, 396 yards, 2 TD
Northern Colorado	Rushing	Mathias Price	12 carries, 30 yards
Northern Colorado	Receiving	Carver Cheeks	7 receptions, 93 yards, TD

=== at No. 11 Idaho ===
Northern Colorado Bears (2–3) at No. 11 Idaho Vandals (2–3) – Game summary

Quarter	1	2	3	4	Total
Bears	13	22	0	14	49
No. 11 Vandals	7	10	8	8	33

at Kibbie Dome • Moscow, ID

- Date: October 11
- Game time: 3:00 p.m. MDT
- Game weather: Indoor • Temperature: 75 °F (24 °C)
- Game attendance: 12,902
- Referee: Gregg Wilson
- TV announcers (ESPN+): Greg Heister (play-by-play) and Adam Shackleford (analyst)

Game information

First quarter

- UNCO - Mathias Price 1-yard run (Jacob Willig kick), 9:57. Bears 7-0. Drive: 11 plays, 75 yards, 5:03.
- UNCO - Jacob Willig 52-yard field goal, 8:44. Bears 10-0. Drive: 5 plays, -3 yards, 0:58.
- IDHO - Elisha Cummings 39-yard pass from Jack Wagner (Owen Adams kick), 5:18. Bears 10-7. Drive: 6 plays, 75 yards, 3:26.
- UNCO - Jacob Willig 43-yard field goal, 2:35. Bears 13-7. Drive: 7 plays, 46 yards, 2:38.

Second quarter

- UNCO - Mathias Price 7-yard pass from Eric Gibson Jr. (Eric Gibson Jr. pass to Brayden Munroe for two-point conversion), 13:13. Bears 21-7. Drive: 7 plays, 53 yards, 2:26.
- IDHO - Rocco Koch 12-yard run (Owen Adams kick), 7:50. Bears 21-14. Drive: 11 plays, 75 yards, 5:23.
- UNCO - Brayden Monroe 22-yard pass from Eric Gibson Jr. (Jacob Willig kick), 3:19. Bears 28-14. Drive: 5 plays, 40 yards, 1:14.
- IDHO - Owen Adams 38-yard field goal, 0:40. Bears 28-17. Drive: 9 plays, 54 yards, 2:39.
- UNCO - Kieryus Boone 10-yard run (Jacob Willig kick), 0:13. Bears 35-17. Drive: 4 plays, 75 yards, 0:27.

Third quarter

- IDHO - Rocco Koch 16-yard run (Rocco Koch run for two-point conversion), 7:23. Bears 35-25. Drive: 15 plays, 75 yards, 7:37.

Fourth quarter

- UNCO - Carver Cheeks 0-yard run (Jacob Willig kick), 12:58. Bears 42-25. Drive: 8 plays, 55 yards, 2:56.
- IDHO - Nate Thomas 10-yard run (Jack Wagner pass to Nolan McWilliams for two-point conversion), 7:49. Bears 42-33. Drive: 13 plays, 75 yards, 5:09.
- UNCO - Brandon Johnson 18-yard run (Jacob Willig kick), 4:32. Bears 49-33. Drive: 5 plays, 62 yards, 3:17.

Statistics	UNCO	IDHO
First downs	23	27
Plays–yards	65–482	76–440
Rushes–yards	30–132	43–203
Passing yards	350	237
Passing: Comp–Att–Int	22-35-0	21-33-2
Turnovers	0	3
Time of possession	25:47	34:13

Team	Category	Player	Statistics
Northern Colorado	Passing	Eric Gibson Jr.	22/34, 350 yards, 2 TD
Northern Colorado	Rushing	Brandon Johnson	5 carries, 36 yards, TD
Northern Colorado	Receiving	Brayden Munroe	5 receptions, 151 yards, TD
Idaho	Passing	Jack Wagner	21/33, 237 yards, TD, 2 INT
Idaho	Rushing	Rocco Koch	10 carries, 81 yards, 2 TD
Idaho	Receiving	Elisha Cummings	5 receptions, 67 yards, TD

=== at Sacramento State ===
Northern Colorado Bears (3–3) at Sacramento State Hornets (3–3) – Game summary

Quarter	1	2	3	4	Total
Bears	0	21	7	7	35
Hornets	3	14	10	13	40

at Hornet Stadium • Sacramento, CA

- Date: October 18
- Game time: 7:00 PM MDT
- Game attendance: 20,022
- Referee: Kelly Holman
- TV: ESPN+

Game information

First quarter

- SAC – Grant Meadors 37-yard field goal, 7:08. Hornets 3–0. Drive: 10 plays, 56 yards, 4:26.

Second quarter

- SAC – Rodney Hammond Jr. 46-yard run (Grant Meadors kick), 14:10. Hornets 10–0. Drive: 4 plays, 54 yards, 1:32.
- UNCO – Carver Cheeks 75-yard pass from Eric Gibson Jr. (Jacob Willig kick), 13:25. Hornets 10–7. Drive: 2 plays, 75 yards, 0:45.
- UNCO – Brandon Johnson 2-yard run (Jacob Willig kick), 6:37. Bears 14–10. Drive: 11 plays, 76 yards, 5:10.
- SAC – Bear Tenney 25-yard pass from Cardell Williams (Grant Meadors kick), 2:20. Hornets 17–14. Drive: 9 plays, 74 yards, 4:09.
- UNCO – Carver Cheeks 6-yard pass from Eric Gibson Jr. (Jacob Willig kick), 0:24. Bears 21–17. Drive: 12 plays, 75 yards, 1:56.

Third quarter

- SAC – Sam Adams II 34-yard run (Grant Meadors kick), 10:29. Hornets 24–21. Drive: 10 plays, 75 yards, 4:31.
- UNCO – Brandon Johnson 2-yard run (Jacob Willig kick), 7:52. Bears 28–24. Drive: 6 plays, 75 yards, 2:37.
- SAC – Grant Meadors 28-yard field goal, 0:47. Bears 28–27. Drive: 14 plays, 61 yards, 7:05.

Fourth quarter

- SAC – Ricky Lee III 34-yard interception return (Grant Meadors kick), 14:53. Hornets 34–28.
- UNCO – Carver Cheeks 62-yard pass from Eric Gibson Jr. (Jacob Willig kick), 14:00. Bears 35–34. Drive: 4 plays, 75 yards, 0:53.
- SAC – Grant Meadors 34-yard field goal, 9:30. Hornets 37–35. Drive: 10 plays, 58 yards, 4:30.
- SAC – Grant Meadors 42-yard field goal, 2:01. Hornets 40–35. Drive: 4 plays, 6 yards, 2:07.

Statistics	UNCO	SAC
First downs	22	21
Plays–yards	68–484	74–434
Rushes–yards	35–163	57–323
Passing yards	321	111
Passing: Comp–Att–Int	21–33–4	9–17–0
Turnovers	4	0
Time of possession	24:03	35:57

Team	Category	Player	Statistics
Northern Colorado	Passing	Eric Gibson Jr.	21/33, 321 yards, 3 TD, 4 INT
Northern Colorado	Rushing	Mathias Price	16 carries, 102 yards
Northern Colorado	Receiving	Carver Cheeks	9 receptions, 223 yards, 3 TD
Sacramento State	Passing	Cardell Williams	8/16, 90 yards, TD
Sacramento State	Rushing	Rodney Hammond Jr.	21 carries, 134 yards, TD
Sacramento State	Receiving	Ernest Campbell	3 receptions, 39 yards

=== No. 6 UC Davis ===
No. 6 UC Davis Aggies (5–1) at Northern Colorado Bears (3–4) – Game summary

Quarter	1	2	3	4	Total
No. 6 Aggies	3	21	0	3	27
Bears	0	7	6	3	16

at Nottingham Field • Greeley, CO

- Date: October 25
- Game time: 1:00 p.m. MDT
- Game attendance: 4,412
- Referee: Jim Crowley
- TV: ESPN+

Game information

First quarter

- UCD – Hunter Ridley 40-yard field goal, 2:10. Aggies 3–0. Drive: 10 plays, 52 yards, 3:37.

Second quarter

- UCD – Jordan Fisher 24-yard pass from Grant Harper (Hunter Ridley kick), 14:53. Aggies 10–0. Drive: 2 plays, 31 yards, 0:37.
- UCD – Samuel Gbatu Jr. 34-yard pass from Grant Harper (Hunter Ridley kick), 9:46. Aggies 17–0. Drive: 6 plays, 84 yards, 3:16.
- UCD – Laviel Pickett 18-yard pass from Grant Harper (Hunter Ridley kick), 3:58. Aggies 24–0. Drive: 3 plays, 52 yards, 1:31.
- UNCO – Brayden Munroe 51-yard pass from Eric Gibson Jr. (Jacob Willig kick), 0:24. Aggies 24–7. Drive: 3 plays, 80 yards, 0:26.

Third quarter

- UNCO – Brandon Johnson 2-yard run (Jacob Willig kick BLOCKED), 2:56. Aggies 24–13. Drive: 2 plays, 9 yards, 0:43.

Fourth quarter

- UNCO – Jacob Willig 29-yard field goal, 7:50. Aggies 24–16. Drive: 8 plays, 45 yards, 4:20.
- UCD – Hunter Ridley 41-yard field goal, 0:50. Aggies 27–16. Drive: 15 plays, 45 yards, 7:00.

Statistics	UCD	UNCO
First downs	22	18
Plays–yards	70–452	67–345
Rushes–yards	39–236	22–76
Passing yards	216	269
Passing: Comp–Att–Int	15–31–2	31–45–1
Turnovers	2	2
Time of possession	29:46	30:14

Team	Category	Player	Statistics
UC Davis	Passing	Grant Harper	15/31, 216 yards, 3 TD, 2 INT
UC Davis	Rushing	Carter Vargas	16 carries, 90 yards
UC Davis	Receiving	Samuel Gbatu Jr.	5 receptions, 108 yards, TD
Northern Colorado	Passing	Eric Gibson Jr.	31/45, 269 yards, TD, INT
Northern Colorado	Rushing	Brandon Johnson	9 carries, 65 yards, TD
Northern Colorado	Receiving	Brayden Munroe	8 receptions, 100 yards, TD

=== No. 4т Montana State ===
No. 4т Montana State Bobcats (6–2) at Northern Colorado Bears (3–5) – Game summary

Quarter	1	2	3	4	Total
No. 4т Bobcats	7	13	21	14	55
Bears	0	0	0	7	7

at Nottingham Field • Greeley, CO

- Date: November 1
- Game time: 12:00 p.m. MDT
- Game weather: Sunny, 48 °F (9 °C)
- Game attendance: 4,092
- Referee: Gregg Wilson
- TV: ESPN+

Game information

First quarter

- MTST – Rocky Lencioni 3-yard pass from Justin Lamson (Myles Sansted kick), 11:01. Bobcats 7–0. Drive: 6 plays, 69 yards, 2:25.

Second quarter

- MTST – Myles Sansted 26-yard field goal, 11:41. Bobcats 10–0. Drive: 13 plays, 75 yards, 5:49.
- MTST – Myles Sansted 24-yard field goal, 3:32. Bobcats 13–0. Drive: 8 plays, 48 yards, 2:27.
- MTST – Adam Jones 2-yard run (Myles Sansted kick), 0:39. Bobcats 20–0. Drive: 7 plays, 85 yards, 0:45.

Third quarter

- MTST – Taco Dowler 67-yard pass from Justin Lamson (Myles Sansted kick), 14:37. Bobcats 27–0. Drive: 2 plays, 75 yards, 0:23.
- MTST – Taco Dowler 18-yard pass from Justin Lamson (Myles Sansted kick), 4:22. Bobcats 34–0. Drive: 4 plays, 81 yards, 2:05.

Fourth quarter

- MTST – Justin Lamson 15-yard run (Myles Sansted kick), 14:52. Bobcats 41–0. Drive: 3 plays, 53 yards, 1:11.
- MTST – Talon Marsh 90-yard interception return (Myles Sansted kick), 9:09. Bobcats 48–0.
- MTST – Jared White 2-yard run (Myles Sansted kick), 6:32. Bobcats 55–0. Drive: 5 plays, 29 yards, 2:28.
- UNCO – Kieryus Boone 6-yard run (Jacob Willig kick), 1:31. Bobcats 55–7. Drive: 12 plays, 75 yards, 5:01.

Statistics	MTST	UNCO
First downs	23	17
Plays–yards	61–532	75–261
Rushes–yards	38–189	35–104
Passing yards	343	157
Passing: Comp–Att–Int	17–23–0	24–40–1
Turnovers	0	2
Time of possession	24:38	35:22

Team	Category	Player	Statistics
Montana State	Passing	Justin Lamson	16/22, 331 yards, 3 TD
Montana State	Rushing	Adam Jones	10 carries, 74 yards, TD
Montana State	Receiving	Taco Dowler	5 receptions, 138 yards, 2 TD
Northern Colorado	Passing	Eric Gibson Jr.	19/33, 93 yards, INT
Northern Colorado	Rushing	Mathias Price	8 carries, 54 yards
Northern Colorado	Receiving	Brayden Munroe	7 receptions, 61 yards

=== at Northern Arizona ===
Northern Colorado Bears (3–6) at Northern Arizona Lumberjacks (5–4) – Game summary

Quarter	1	2	3	4	Total
Bears	0	10	0	0	10
Lumberjacks	14	14	14	7	49

at Walkup Skydome • Flagstaff, AZ

- Date: November 8
- Game time: 4:00 p.m. MST
- Game weather: none (played indoors)
- Game attendance: 8,010
- Referee: Jeff Rink
- TV: ESPN+

Game information

First quarter

- NAU – Jayson Raines 14-yard pass from Ty Pennington (Samuel Hunsaker kick), 8:03. Lumberjacks 7–0. Drive: 9 plays, 72 yards, 5:24.
- NAU – Darvon Hubbard 4-yard run (Samuel Hunsaker kick), 3:41. Lumberjacks 14–0. Drive: 6 plays, 75 yards, 2:56.

Second quarter

- UNCO – Jacob Willig 32-yard field goal, 13:01. Lumberjacks 14–3. Drive: 11 plays, 60 yards, 5:40.
- NAU – Quran Gossett 7-yard run (Samuel Hunsaker kick), 2:00. Lumberjacks 21–3. Drive: 7 plays, 47 yards, 4:05.
- UNCO – Brandon Johnson 3-yard run (Jacob Willig kick), 0:23. Lumberjacks 21–10. Drive: 10 plays, 75 yards, 1:37.
- NAU – Kolbe Katsis 100-yard kickoff return (Samuel Hunsaker kick), 0:10. Lumberjacks 28–10.

Third quarter

- NAU – Seth Cromwell 2-yard run (Samuel Hunsaker kick), 13:00. Lumberjacks 35–10. Drive: 4 plays, 75 yards, 2:00.
- NAU – Seth Cromwell 7-yard run (Samuel Hunsaker kick), 1:04. Lumberjacks 42–10. Drive: 7 plays, 80 yards, 3:01.

Fourth quarter

- NAU – Ryan Fontaine 7-yard run (Samuel Hunsaker kick), 5:15. Lumberjacks 49–10. Drive: 10 plays, 59 yards, 6:17.

Statistics	UNCO	NAU
First downs	16	25
Plays–yards	63–285	60–481
Rushes–yards	29–105	35–234
Passing yards	180	247
Passing: Comp–Att–Int	20–34–1	22–25–0
Turnovers	1	0
Time of possession	26:10	33:50

Team	Category	Player	Statistics
Northern Colorado	Passing	Eric Gibson Jr.	17/28, 151 yards
Northern Colorado	Rushing	Brandon Johnson	7 carries, 36 yards, TD
Northern Colorado	Receiving	Brayden Munroe	4 receptions, 64 yards
Northern Arizona	Passing	Ty Pennington	19/22, 225 yards, TD
Northern Arizona	Rushing	Kolbe Katsis	2 carries, 51 yards
Northern Arizona	Receiving	Isaiah Eastman	6 receptions, 84 yards

=== at Eastern Washington ===
Northern Colorado Bears (3–7) at Eastern Washington Eagles (4–6) – Game summary

Quarter	1	2	3	4	Total
Bears	0	7	0	0	7
Eagles	3	17	7	0	27

at Roos Field • Cheney, WA

- Date: November 15
- Game time: 2:00 PM MST
- Game weather: Cloudy • Temperature: 53 °F (12 °C)
- Game attendance: 4,300
- Referee: Robert Quello
- TV: ESPN+

Game information

First quarter

- EWU – Soren McKee 38-yard field goal, 6:42. Eagles 3–0. Drive: 9 plays, 42 yards, 4:01.

Second quarter

- UNCO – Carver Cheeks 12-yard pass from Eric Gibson Jr. (Jacob Willig kick), 14:50. Bears 7–3. Drive: 2 plays, 10 yards, 0:40.
- EWU – Cole Pruett 12-yard pass from Jake Schakel (Soren McKee kick), 11:00. Eagles 10–7. Drive: 9 plays, 75 yards, 3:50.
- EWU – Nolan Ulm 14-yard pass from Jake Schakel (Soren McKee kick), 3:07. Eagles 17–7. Drive: 7 plays, 48 yards, 1:50.
- EWU – Soren McKee 22-yard field goal, 0:@3. Eagles 20–7. Drive: 12 plays, 59 yards, 1:49.

Third quarter

- EWU – Kevin Allen III 1-yard run (Soren McKee kick), 9:45. Eagles 27–7. Drive: 12 plays, 80 yards, 5:09.

Fourth quarter

- No scoring plays.

Statistics	UNCO	EWU
First downs	18	25
Plays–yards	68–326	71–374
Rushes–yards	32–131	28–75
Passing yards	195	299
Passing: Comp–Att–Int	21–36–5	31–43–1
Turnovers	5	1
Time of possession	31:04	28:56

Team	Category	Player	Statistics
Northern Colorado	Passing	Eric Gibson Jr.	13/19, 108 yards, TD, 2 INT
Northern Colorado	Rushing	Brandon Johnson	7 carries, 41 yards
Northern Colorado	Receiving	Brayden Munroe	6 receptions, 59 yards
Eastern Washington	Passing	Jake Schakel	31/41, 299 yards, 2 TD, INT
Eastern Washington	Rushing	Kaden Rolfsness	8 carries, 36 yards
Eastern Washington	Receiving	Miles Williams	6 receptions, 94 yards

=== Portland State ===
Portland State Vikings (1–10) at Northern Colorado Bears (3–8) – Game summary

Quarter	1	2	3	4	Total
Vikings	7	0	3	3	13
Bears	0	14	7	3	24

at Nottingham Field • Greeley, CO

- Date: November 22
- Game time: 12:00 p.m. MST
- Game weather: Sunny • Temperature: 50 °F (10 °C)
- Game attendance: 2,902
- Referee: Jim Crowley
- TV: ESPN+

Game information

First quarter

- PRST – Cru Newman 3-yard run (Mathias Uribe kick), 8:55. Vikings 7–0. Drive: 8 plays, 52 yards, 4:07.

Second quarter

- UNCO – Justin Guin 44-yard run (Jacob Willig kick), 11:30. Tied 7–7. Drive: 2 plays, 45 yards, 0:43.
- UNCO – Brandon Johnson 1-yard run (Jacob Willig kick), 0:43. Bears 14–7. Drive: 5 plays, 52 yards, 1:08.

Third quarter

- PRST – Mathias Uribe 44-yard field goal, 11:27. Bears 14–10. Drive: 9 plays, 49 yards, 3:33.
- UNCO – Mathias Price 3-yard run (Jacob Willig kick), 8:38. Bears 21–10. Drive: 7 plays, 75 yards, 2:49.

Fourth quarter

- PRST – Mathias Uribe 36-yard field goal, 3:43. Bears 21–13. Drive: 10 plays, 49 yards, 3:40.
- UNCO – Jacob Willig 22-yard field goal, 0:38. Bears 24–13. Drive: 9 plays, 70 yards, 3:05.

Statistics	PRST	UNCO
First downs	23	11
Plays–yards	75–326	49–309
Rushes–yards	44–163	32–215
Passing yards	163	94
Passing: Comp–Att–Int	20–31–1	12–17–0
Turnovers	1	0
Time of possession	36:59	23:01

Team	Category	Player	Statistics
Portland State	Passing	John-Keawe Sagapolutele	10/15, 69 yards, INT
Portland State	Rushing	Delon Thompson	14 carries, 60 yards
Portland State	Receiving	Terence Loville	5 receptions, 48 yards
Northern Colorado	Passing	Eric Gibson Jr.	12/17, 94 yards
Northern Colorado	Rushing	Justin Guin	9 carries, 115 yards, TD
Northern Colorado	Receiving	Carver Cheeks	4 receptions, 43 yards
