= 2025 Eastern Washington Eagles football team =

American college football season

2025 Eastern Washington Eagles football
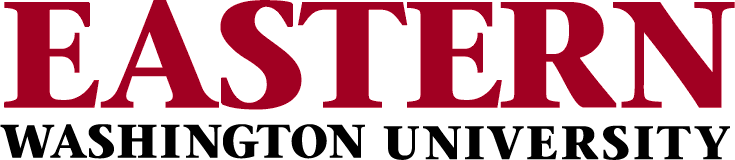
- Conference: Big Sky Conference
- Record: 5–7 (4–4 Big Sky)
- Head coach: Aaron Best (9th season)
- Offensive coordinator: Marc Anderson (1st season)
- Defensive coordinator: Eric Sanders (2nd season)
- Home stadium: Roos Field

2025 Big Sky Conference football standings
	Conf.			Overall
Team	W		L	W		L
No. 1 Montana State $^	8	–	0	14	–	2
No. 3 Montana ^	7	–	1	13	–	2
No. 8 UC Davis ^	6	–	2	9	–	4
Sacramento State	5	–	3	7	–	5
Idaho State	5	–	3	6	–	6
Northern Arizona	4	–	4	7	–	5
Eastern Washington	4	–	4	5	–	7
Cal Poly	2	–	6	4	–	8
Idaho	2	–	6	4	–	8
Northern Colorado	2	–	6	4	–	8
Weber State	2	–	6	4	–	8
Portland State	1	–	7	1	–	11
$ – Conference champion; ^ – FCS playoff participant; Rankings from STATS Poll

The 2025 Eastern Washington Eagles football team represented Eastern Washington University as a member of the Big Sky Conference during the 2025 NCAA Division I FCS football season. The Eagles were led by ninth-year head coach Aaron Best and played at the Roos Field in Cheney, Washington.

== Schedule ==
Date	Time	Opponent	Site	TV	Result	Attendance
August 30	4:00 p.m.	at No. 5 Incarnate Word*	Gayle and Tom Benson Stadium; San Antonio, TX	ESPN+	L 21–31	2,263
September 5	6:00 p.m.	at Boise State*	Albertsons Stadium; Boise, ID	FS1	L 14–51	32,887
September 13	2:00 p.m.	at Northern Iowa*	UNI-Dome; Cedar Falls, IA	ESPN+	L 14–17	10,774
September 20	4:00 p.m.	Western Illinois*	Roos Field; Cheney, WA	ESPN+	W 52–31	5,301
September 27	1:00 p.m.	at No. 4 Montana State	Bobcat Stadium; Bozeman, MT	ESPN+	L 3–57	22,277
October 4	4:00 p.m.	Portland State^{†}	Roos Field; Cheney, WA (The Dam Cup)	ESPN+	W 35–27	6,003
October 18	4:00 p.m.	No. 24 Idaho	Roos Field; Cheney, WA	ESPN+	W 21–14	6,071
October 25	12:00 p.m.	at Weber State	Stewart Stadium; Ogden, UT	ESPN+	W 23–20	3,682
November 1	1:00 p.m.	Sacramento State	Roos Field; Cheney, WA	ESPN+	L 13–35	4,356
November 8	12:00 p.m.	at No. 2 Montana	Washington–Grizzly Stadium; Missoula, MT (EWU–UM Governors Cup)	ESPN+	L 24–29	25,861
November 15	1:00 p.m.	Northern Colorado	Roos Field; Cheney, WA	ESPN+	W 27–7	4,300
November 22	2:00 p.m.	at Cal Poly	Alex G. Spanos Stadium; San Luis Obispo, CA	ESPN+	L 34–43	6,732
*Non-conference game; ^{†}Homecoming; Rankings from STATS Poll released prior to the game; All times are in Pacific time

== Game summaries ==
=== at No. 5 Incarnate Word ===
Eastern Washington Eagles (0–0) at No. 5 Incarnate Word Cardinals (0–1) – Game summary

Quarter	1	2	3	4	Total
Eagles	0	21	0	0	21
No. 5 Cardinals	7	17	0	7	31

at Gayle and Tom Benson Stadium • San Antonio, TX

- Date: August 30
- Game time: 4:00 PM PST
- Game weather: Sunny • Temperature: 102 °F (39 °C) • Wind: SE at 9 miles per hour (14 km/h)
- Game attendance: 2,263
- Referee: Gary Leeper
- TV announcers (ESPN+): Karl Schoening (play-by-play) and Sam Kaman (analyst)

Game information

First quarter

- UIW – 6:22 Harlan Dixon 10 yard run, Will Faris kick UIW 7–0 Drive: 13 plays, 80 yards, 4:45

Second quarter

- UIW – 13:15 Timothy Carter 1 yard run, Will Faris kick UIW 14–0 Drive: 6 plays, 49 yards, 1:31
- EWU – 9:55 Marceese Yetts 26 yard run, Soren McKee kick UIW 14–7 Drive: 7 plays, 71 yards, 3:12
- UIW – 9:43 Jameson Garcia 75 yard pass from Richard Torres, Will Faris kick UIW 21–7 Drive: 1 play, 75 yards, 0:12
- EWU – 7:45 Jared Taylor 3 yard run, Soren McKee kick UIW 21–14 Drive: 3 plays, 6 yards, 1:17
- EWU – 4:24 Marceese Yetts 24 yard run, Soren McKee kick UIW 21–21 Drive: 4 plays, 61 yards, 2:19
- UIW – 0:03 Will Faris 37 yard field goal UIW 24–21 Drive: 15 plays, 56 yards, 4:21

Third quarter

- No scoring plays.

Fourth quarter

- UIW – 2:48 Harlan Dixon 1 yard run, Will Faris kick UIW 31–21 Drive: 11 plays, 74 yards, 5:34

Statistics	EWU	UIW
First downs	15	27
Plays–yards	62–290	85–463
Rushes–yards	23–107	47–131
Passing yards	183	332
Passing: Comp–Att–Int	21–39–1	27–38–0
Turnovers	2	1
Time of possession	25:41	34:19

Team	Category	Player	Statistics
Eastern Washington	Passing	Jared Taylor	21/38, 183 yards
Eastern Washington	Rushing	Marceese Yetts	6 carries, 59 yards, 2 TD
Eastern Washington	Receiving	Marceese Yetts	7 receptions, 63 yards
Incarnate Word	Passing	Richard Torres	27/38, 332 yards, TD
Incarnate Word	Rushing	Harlan Dixon	14 carries, 75 yards, 2 TD
Incarnate Word	Receiving	Jameson Garcia	6 receptions, 146 yards, TD

=== at Boise State (FBS) ===
Eastern Washington Eagles (0–1) at Boise State Broncos (FBS) (0–1) – Game summary

Quarter	1	2	3	4	Total
Eagles	0	7	0	7	14
Broncos (FBS)	20	10	7	14	51

at Albertsons Stadium • Boise, ID

- Date: September 5, 2025
- Game time: 7:00 p.m. MDT
- Game attendance: 32,887
- Referee: Christian Watson
- TV announcers (FS1): Noah Reed (play-by-play) and Robert Smith (analyst)

Game information

First quarter

- BOIS – Malik Sherrod 20-yard run (Colton Boomer kick BLOCKED), 13:50. Broncos 6–0. Drive: 3 plays, 75 yards, 1:10.
- BOIS – Sire Gaines 8-yard run (Colton Boomer kick), 10:01. Broncos 13–0. Drive: 6 plays, 41 yards, 2:03.
- BOIS – Ben Ford 60-yard pass from Maddux Madsen (Colton Boomer kick), 2:49. Broncos 20–0. Drive: 1 play, 60 yards, 0:08.

Second quarter

- EWU – Jared Taylor 5-yard run (Soren McKee kick), 8:53. Broncos 20–7. Drive: 10 plays, 72 yards, 4:43.
- BOIS – Maddux Madsen 11-yard run (Canaan Moore kick), 6:26. Broncos 27–7. Drive: 5 plays, 80 yards, 2:19.
- BOIS – Canaan Moore 35-yard field goal, 0:50. Broncos 30–7. Drive: 5 plays, 31 yards, 0:53.

Third quarter

- BOIS – Cameron Bates 20-yard run (Canaan Moore kick), 4:55. Broncos 37–7. Drive: 9 plays, 65 yards, 4:53.

Fourth quarter

- BOIS – Ben Ford 6-yard pass from Maddux Madsen (Canaan Moore kick), 11:56. Broncos 44–7. Drive: 12 plays, 90 yards, 6:02.
- EWU – Nate Bell 2-yard run (Soren McKee kick), 5:30. Broncos 44–14. Drive: 6 plays, 80 yards, 2:46.
- BOIS – Dylan Riley 77-yard run (Canaan Moore kick), 3:54. Broncos 51–14. Drive: 3 plays, 75 yards, 1:36.

Statistics	EWU	BOIS
First downs	13	22
Plays–yards	68–293	68–637
Rushes–yards	31–117	39–328
Passing yards	176	309
Passing: Comp–Att–Int	19–37–1	17–29–0
Turnovers	2	0
Time of possession	31:36	28:24

Team	Category	Player	Statistics
Eastern Washington	Passing	Jared Taylor	14/28, 102 yards
Eastern Washington	Rushing	Jared Taylor	17 carries, 76 yards, TD
Eastern Washington	Receiving	Noah Cronquist	4 receptions, 67 yards
Boise State	Passing	Maddux Madsen	16/26, 307 yards, 2 TD
Boise State	Rushing	Dylan Riley	6 carries, 123 yards, TD
Boise State	Receiving	Chris Marshall	4 receptions, 132 yards

=== at Northern Iowa ===
Eastern Washington Eagles (0–2) at Northern Iowa Panthers (1–1) – Game summary

Quarter	1	2	3	4	Total
Eagles	0	0	0	14	14
Panthers	7	3	7	0	17

at UNI-Dome • Cedar Falls, IA

- Date: September 13
- Game time: 2:00 p.m. PDT
- Game weather: none (played indoors)
- Game attendance: 10,774
- Referee: Grant Henderson
- TV announcers (ESPN+): Brad Wells (play-by-play) and Justin Surrency (analyst)

Game information

First quarter

- UNI – Tysen Kershaw 79-yard pass from Matthew Schecklman (Max Bartachek kick), 13:04. Panthers 7–0. Drive: 1 play, 79 yards, 0:12.

Second quarter

- UNI – Max Bartachek 28-yard field goal, 0:00. Panthers 10–0. Drive: 10 plays, 88 yards, 2:57.

Third quarter

- UNI – Ayden Price 63-yard pass from Matthew Schecklman (Max Bartachek kick), 7:18. Panthers 17–0. Drive: 3 plays, 79 yards, 1:24.

Fourth quarter

- EWU – Nate Bell 15-yard run (Soren McKee kick), 13:32. Panthers 17–7. Drive: 4 plays, 37 yards, 1:28.
- EWU – Nate Bell 40-yard run (Soren McKee kick), 8:30. Panthers 17–14. Drive: 5 plays, 55 yards, 1:54.

Statistics	EWU	UNI
First downs	16	23
Plays–yards	60–276	75–495
Rushes–yards	25–117	40–136
Passing yards	159	359
Passing: Comp–Att–Int	21–35–0	23–35–1
Turnovers	0	2
Time of possession	23:40	36:20

Team	Category	Player	Statistics
Eastern Washington	Passing	Nate Bell	21/35, 159 yards
Eastern Washington	Rushing	Nate Bell	14 carries, 89 yards, 2 TD
Eastern Washington	Receiving	Noah Cronquist	5 receptions, 42 yards
Northern Iowa	Passing	Matthew Schecklman	23/34, 359 yards, 2 TD, INT
Northern Iowa	Rushing	Harrison Bey-Buie	26 carries, 86 yards
Northern Iowa	Receiving	Tysen Kershaw	6 receptions, 143 yards, TD

=== Western Illinois ===
Western Illinois Leathernecks (1–2) at Eastern Washington Eagles (0–3) – Game summary

Quarter	1	2	3	4	Total
Leathernecks	3	14	7	7	31
Eagles	15	12	10	15	52

at Roos Field • Cheney, WA

- Date: September 20
- Game time: 4:00 pm PDT
- Game weather: Sunny • Temperature: 83 °F (28 °C)
- Game attendance: 5,301
- Referee: Gregg Wilson
- TV announcers (ESPN+): Austin Getz (play-by-play) and Bill Ames (analyst)

Game information

First quarter

- EWU – Jaxon Branch 35-yard pass from Nate Bell (Nate Bell–Landon Cooper pass), 7:57. Eagles 8–0. Drive: 7 plays, 52 yards, 2:53.
- WIU – Antonio Chadha 39-yard field goal, 2:37. Eagles 8–3. Drive: 8 plays, 26 yards, 3:05.
- EWU – Landon Cooper 64-yard pass from Nate Bell (Hunter McKee kick), 1:31. Eagles 15–3. Drive: 4 plays, 75 yards, 1:06.

Second quarter

- WIU – Christian Anaya 14-yard pass from Chris Irvin (Antonio Chadha kick), 14:54. Eagles 15–10. Drive: 5 plays, 75 yards, 1:37.
- EWU – Wesley Garrett 67-yard run (Hunter McKee kick failed), 9:39. Eagles 21–10. Drive: 6 plays, 95 yards, 2:41.
- WIU – Markell Holman 2-yard run (Antonio Chadha kick), 3:17. Eagles 21–17. Drive: 5 plays, 35 yards, 2:11.
- EWU – Nate Bell 2-yard run (Soren McKee kick failed), 0:52. Eagles 27–17. Drive: 2 plays, 48 yards, 0:13.

Third quarter

- EWU – Marceese Yetts 4-yard run (Soren McKee kick), 14:27. Eagles 34–17. Drive: 1 play, 4 yards, 0:05.
- WIU – Christian Anaya 3-yard pass from Chris Irvin (Antonio Chadha kick), 10:43. Eagles 34–24. Drive: 8 plays, 64 yards, 3:37.
- EWU – Soren McKee 23-yard field goal, 1:52. Eagles 37–24. Drive: 9 plays, 70 yards, 3:35.

Fourth quarter

- WIU – Chris Irvin 4-yard run (Antonio Chadha kick), 12:29. Eagles 37–31. Drive: 10 plays, 75 yards, 4:18.
- EWU – Nate Bell 6-yard run (Nate Bell–Noah Cronquist pass), 11:11. Eagles 45–31. Drive: 5 plays, 75 yards, 1:18.
- EWU – Nate Bell 9-yard run (Soren McKee kick), 7:05. Eagles 52–31. Drive: 5 plays, 32 yards, 1:54.

Statistics	WIU	EWU
First downs	22	22
Plays–yards	82–358	71–597
Rushes–yards	39–150	42–325
Passing yards	208	272
Passing: Comp–Att–Int	21-43-1	11-29-2
Turnovers	1	2
Time of possession	32:22	27:38

Team	Category	Player	Statistics
Western Illinois	Passing	Chris Irvin	16/34, 167 yards, 2 TD, INT
Western Illinois	Rushing	Markell Holman	28 carries, 118 yards, TD
Western Illinois	Receiving	Tristin Duncan	5 receptions, 110 yards
Eastern Washington	Passing	Nate Bell	11/29, 272 yards, 2 TD, 2 INT
Eastern Washington	Rushing	Nate Bell	18 carries, 144 yards, 3 TD
Eastern Washington	Receiving	Miles Williams	3 receptions, 78 yards

=== at No. 4 Montana State ===
Eastern Washington Eagles (1–3) at No. 4 Montana State Bobcats (2–2) – Game summary

Quarter	1	2	3	4	Total
Eagles	0	3	0	0	3
No. 4 Bobcats	24	6	20	7	57

at Bobcat Stadium • Bozeman, MT

- Date: September 27
- Game time: 1:00 p.m.
- Game weather: Sunny, 71 °F (22 °C)
- Game attendance: 22,277
- Referee: Jim Crowley
- TV announcers (ESPN+): Ben Creighton (play-by-play), Ty Gregorak (analyst) and Grace Lawrence (sideline)

Game information

First quarter

- MTST – Adam Jones 3-yard run (Myles Sansted kick), 9:53. Bobcats 7–0. Drive: 8 plays, 53 yards, 3:53.
- MTST – Hunter Provience 43-yard pass from Justin Lamson (Myles Sansted kick), 6:16. Bobcats 14–0. Drive: 2 plays, 44 yards, 0:43.
- MTST – Taco Dowler 45-yard pass from Justin Lamson (Myles Sansted kick), 4:47. Bobcats 21–0. Drive: 1 play, 45 yards, 0:07.
- MTST – Myles Sansted 43-yard field goal, 0:20. Bobcats 24–0. Drive: 6 plays, 19 yards, 2:28.

Second quarter

- EWU – Soren McKee 21-yard field goal, 6:29. Bobcats 24–3. Drive: 11 plays, 63 yards, 4:21.
- MTST – Jabez Woods 28-yard pass from Justin Lamson (kick failed), 0:22. Bobcats 30–3. Drive: 3 plays, 40 yards, 0:15.

Third quarter

- MTST – Colby Frokjer 26-yard run (kick failed), 10:48. Bobcats 36–3. Drive: 9 plays, 75 yards, 4:12.
- MTST – Adam Jones 37-yard run (Myles Sansted kick), 3:22. Bobcats 43–3. Drive: 9 plays, 80 yards, 4:31.
- MTST – Colson Coon 1-yard run (Myles Sansted kick), 1:23. Bobcats 50–3. Drive: 2 plays, 55 yards, 0:40.

Fourth quarter

- MTST – Chance Wilson 32-yard run (Myles Sansted kick), 4:38. Bobcats 57–3. Drive: 4 plays, 45 yards, 1:37.

Statistics	EWU	MTST
First downs	14	25
Plays–yards	67–207	70–580
Rushes–yards	36–83	44–293
Passing yards	124	287
Passing: Comp–Att–Int	15–31–0	15–26–1
Turnovers	1	1
Time of possession	27:54	32:06

Team	Category	Player	Statistics
Eastern Washington	Passing	Jared Taylor	5/12, 59 yards
Eastern Washington	Rushing	Nate Bell	13 carries, 41 yards
Eastern Washington	Receiving	Nolan Ulm	1 reception, 35 yards
Montana State	Passing	Justin Lamson	13/20, 270 yards, 3 TD
Montana State	Rushing	Adam Jones	10 carries, 72 yards, 2 TD
Montana State	Receiving	Taco Dowler	3 receptions, 64 yards, TD

=== Portland State (The Dam Cup) ===
Portland State Vikings (0–5) at Eastern Washington Eagles (1–4) – Game summary

Quarter	1	2	3	4	Total
Vikings	7	10	3	7	27
Eagles	14	7	14	0	35

at Roos Field • Cheney, WA

- Date: October 4
- Game time: 4:00 p.m. PDT
- Game weather: Sunny • Temperature: 64 °F (18 °C) • Wind:7 miles per hour (11 km/h)
- Game attendance: 6,003
- Referee: Kelly Holman
- TV: ESPN+

Game information

First quarter

- EWU – Nate Bell 45-yard run (Soren McKee kick), 10:47. Eagles 7–0. Drive: 5 plays, 88 yards, 1:55.
- PRST – Delon Thompson 2-yard run (Fyodor Henrichs-Tarasenkov kick), 4:01. Tied 7–7. Drive: 12 plays, 75 yards, 6:46.
- EWU – Kevin Allen III 8-yard run (Soren McKee kick), 0:59. Eagles 14–7. Drive: 8 plays, 78 yards, 2:55.

Second quarter

- EWU – Marceese Yetts 37-yard run (Soren McKee kick), 4:40. Eagles 21–7. Drive: 9 plays, 74 yards, 3:14.
- PRST – Delon Thompson 1-yard run (Mathias Uribe kick), 1:00. Eagles 21–14. Drive: 9 plays, 75 yards, 3:40.
- PRST – Mathias Uribe 38-yard field goal, 0:24. Eagles 21–17. Drive: 4 plays, 0 yards, 0:16.

Third quarter

- PRST – Mathias Uribe 25-yard field goal, 7:45. Eagles 21–20. Drive: 10 plays, 50 yards, 6:04.
- EWU – Landon Cooper 9-yard pass from Nate Bell (Soren McKee kick), 5:03. Eagles 28–20. Drive: 6 plays, 62 yards, 2:36.
- EWU – Kevin Allen III 50-yard run (Soren McKee kick), 3:10. Eagles 35–20. Drive: 3 plays, 70 yards, 1:05.

Fourth quarter

- PRST – Terence Loville 24-yard pass from John-Keawe Sagapolutele (Mathias Uribe kick), 9:56. Eagles 35–27. Drive: 3 plays, 43 yards, 1:15.

Statistics	PRST	EWU
First downs	24	19
Plays–yards	64–469	60–461
Rushes–yards	37–130	41–333
Passing yards	339	128
Passing: Comp–Att–Int	29–47–1	11–19–1
Turnovers	1	3
Time of possession	35:20	24:40

Team	Category	Player	Statistics
Portland State	Passing	John-Keawe Sagapolutele	28/45, 302 yards, TD, INT
Portland State	Rushing	Delon Thompson	25 carries, 60 yards, 2 TD
Portland State	Receiving	Terence Loville	7 receptions, 114 yards, TD
Eastern Washington	Passing	Nate Bell	10/18, 95 yards, TD, INT
Eastern Washington	Rushing	Nate Bell	17 carries, 175 yards, TD
Eastern Washington	Receiving	Marceese Yetts	2 receptions, 43 yards

=== No. 24 Idaho ===
No. 24 Idaho Vandals (2–4) at Eastern Washington Eagles (2–4) – Game summary

Quarter	1	2	3	4	Total
No. 24 Vandals	7	0	0	7	14
Eagles	3	10	0	8	21

at Roos Field • Cheney, WA

- Date: October 18
- Game time: 4:00 p.m. PDT
- Game weather: Cloudy • Temperature: 53 °F (12 °C)
- Game attendance: 6,071
- Referee: Mike Bezner
- TV announcers (ESPN+): Austin Getz (play-by-play) and Bill Ames (analyst)

Game information

First quarter

- EWU - Soren McKee 31-yard field goal, 4:18. Eagles 3-0. Drive: 9 plays, 37 yards, 2:15.
- IDHO - Marquawn McCraney 26-yard pass from Jack Wagner (Owen Adams kick), 1:11. Vandals 7-3. Drive: 6 plays, 75 yards, 3:07.

Second quarter

- EWU - Soren McKee 39-yard field goal, 1:31. Vandals 7-6. Drive: 14 plays, 36 yards, 6:26.
- EWU - Miles Williams 9-yard pass from Nate Bell (Soren McKee kick), 0:44. Eagles 13-7. Drive: 3 plays, 32 yards, 0:18.

Third quarter

- No scoring plays.

Fourth quarter

- EWU - Miles Williams 6-yard pass from Nate Bell (Jaxon Branch pass for two-point conversion), 14:12. Eagles 21-7. Drive: 8 plays, 93 yards, 3:08.
- IDHO - Michael Graves 40-yard pass from Nick Josifek (Owen Adams kick), 2:30. Eagles 21-14. Drive: 7 plays, 80 yards, 1:32.

Statistics	IDHO	EWU
First downs	17	14
Plays–yards	73–338	67–305
Rushes–yards	41–147	36–128
Passing yards	191	177
Passing: Comp–Att–Int	14–32–1	18–31–1
Turnovers	1	2
Time of possession	30:41	29:19

Team	Category	Player	Statistics
Idaho	Passing	Nick Josifek	6/13, 104 yards, TD
Idaho	Rushing	Rocco Koch	14 carries, 81 yards
Idaho	Receiving	Marquawn McCraney	7 receptions, 105 yards, TD
Eastern Washington	Passing	Nate Bell	18/31, 177 yards, 2 TD, INT
Eastern Washington	Rushing	Nate Bell	23 carries, 134 yards
Eastern Washington	Receiving	Miles Williams	4 receptions, 40 yards, 2 TD

=== at Weber State ===
Eastern Washington Eagles (3–4) at Weber State Wildcats (3–4) – Game summary

Quarter	1	2	3	4	Total
Eagles	9	14	0	0	23
Wildcats	7	7	3	3	20

at Stewart Stadium • Ogden, UT

- Date: October 25
- Game time: 12:00 p.m. PDT
- Game weather: Cloudy Temperature: 66 °F (19 °C) • Wind: SW at 6 miles per hour (9.7 km/h)
- Game attendance: 3,682
- Referee: John Nardi
- TV announcers (ESPN+): Tony Parks (play-by-play) and Riley Jensen (analyst)

Game information

First quarter

- WEB – Davion Godley 34-yard run (Sloan Calder kick), 13:49. Wildcats 7–0. Drive: 3 plays, 75 yards, 1:11.
- EWU – Jared Taylor 2-yard run (Soren McKee kick), 12:49. Tied 7–7. Drive: 1 play, 2 yards, 0:06.
- EWU – Team safety, 3:24. Eagles 9–7.

Second quarter

- WEB – Chauncey Sylvester 5-yard run (Sloan Calder kick), 9:34. Wildcats 14–9. Drive: 7 plays, 60 yards, 3:22.
- EWU – Jaxon Branch 7-yard pass from Nate Bell (Soren McKee kick), 4:32. Eagles 16–14. Drive: 10 plays, 75 yards, 5:02.
- EWU – Jared Taylor 2-yard run (Soren McKee kick), 0:31. Eagles 23–14. Drive: 7 plays, 65 yards, 2:10.

Third quarter

- WEB – Sloan Calder 38-yard field goal, 5:57. Eagles 23–17. Drive: 6 plays, 44 yards, 2:53.

Fourth quarter

- WEB – Sloan Calder 37-yard field goal, 6:23. Eagles 23–20. Drive: 14 plays, 55 yards, 5:25.

Statistics	EWU	WEB
First downs	16	16
Plays–yards	69–199	61–345
Rushes–yards	40–30	34–205
Passing yards	169	140
Passing: Comp–Att–Int	20–29–0	17–27–2
Turnovers	0	3
Time of possession	32:41	27:19

Team	Category	Player	Statistics
Eastern Washington	Passing	Nate Bell	20/29, 169 yards, TD
Eastern Washington	Rushing	Jared Taylor	11 carries, 23 yards, 2 TD
Eastern Washington	Receiving	Noah Cronquist	5 receptions, 66 yards
Weber State	Passing	Dijon Jennings	17/27, 140 yards, 2 INT
Weber State	Rushing	Davion Godley	8 carries, 95 yards, TD
Weber State	Receiving	Jayleen Record	5 receptions, 46 yards

=== Sacramento State ===
Sacramento State Hornets (4–4) at Eastern Washington Eagles (4–4) – Game summary

Quarter	1	2	3	4	Total
Hornets	14	14	0	7	35
Eagles	10	3	0	0	13

at Roos Field • Cheney, WA

- Date: November 1
- Game time: 1:00 p.m. MDT
- Game attendance: 4,356
- Referee: Spencer Mumford
- TV: ESPN+

Game information

First quarter

- SAC – Cardell Williams 1-yard run (Grant Meadors kick), 12:52. Hornets 7–0. Drive: 5 plays, 75 yards, 2:08.
- EWU – Wilson Medina 5-yard pass from Nate Bell (Soren McKee kick), 8:41. Tied 7–7. Drive: 6 plays, 30 yards, 2:16.
- EWU – Soren McKee 51-yard field goal, 7:36. Eagles 10–7. Drive: 4 plays, -13 yards, 0:49.
- SAC – Rodney Hammond Jr. 59-yard run (Grant Meadors kick), 5:16. Hornets 14–10. Drive: 5 plays, 75 yards, 2:20.

Second quarter

- SAC – JaQuail Smith 45-yard run (Grant Meadors kick), 13:26. Hornets 21–10. Drive: 1 play, 45 yards, 0:11.
- SAC – Rodney Hammond Jr. 7-yard run (Grant Meadors kick), 4:07. Hornets 28–10. Drive: 5 plays, 35 yards, 2:16.
- EWU – Soren McKee 19-yard field goal, 0:00. Hornets 28–13. Drive: 8 plays, 27 yards, 0:52.

Third quarter

- No scoring plays.

Fourth quarter

- SAC – JaQuail Smith 29-yard run (Grant Meadors kick), 9:47. Hornets 35–13. Drive: 5 plays, 48 yards, 2:38.

Statistics	SAC	EWU
First downs	16	20
Plays–yards	62–391	83–278
Rushes–yards	56–376	30–38
Passing yards	15	240
Passing: Comp–Att–Int	3–6–1	30–53–0
Turnovers	3	0
Time of possession	29:29	30:31

Team	Category	Player	Statistics
Sacramento State	Passing	Cardell Williams	3/6, 15 yards, INT
Sacramento State	Rushing	Rodney Hammond Jr.	22 carries, 208 yards, 2 TD
Sacramento State	Receiving	Gavin Nelson	1 reception, 10 yards
Eastern Washington	Passing	Jake Schakel	24/38, 201 yards
Eastern Washington	Rushing	Nate Bell	5 carries, 24 yards
Eastern Washington	Receiving	Drew Carlson	4 receptions, 57 yards

=== at No. 2 Montana (EWU–UM Governors Cup) ===
Eastern Washington Eagles (4–5) at No. 2 Montana Grizzlies (9–0) – Game summary

Quarter	1	2	3	4	Total
Eagles	0	14	3	7	24
No. 2 Grizzlies	14	8	7	0	29

at Washington–Grizzly Stadium • Missoula, MT

- Date: November 8
- Game time: 1:00 p.m. MDT
- Game attendance: 25,861
- Referee: Jim Crowley
- TV: ESPN+

Game information

First quarter

- MONT – Michael Wortham 12-yard pass from Keali'i Ah Yat (Ty Morrison kick), 11:09. Grizzlies 7–0. Drive: 5 plays, 24 yards, 2:05.
- MONT – Korbin Hendrix 29-yard pass from Keali'i Ah Yat (Ty Morrison kick), 4:10. Grizzlies 14–0. Drive: 4 plays, 78 yards, 1:22.

Second quarter

- MONT – Keali'i Ah Yat 3-yard run (Brooks Davis run), 10:27. Grizzlies 22–0. Drive: 11 plays, 88 yards, 5:37.
- EWU – Kevin Allen III 10-yard pass from Jake Schakel (Soren McKee kick), 8:17. Grizzlies 22–7. Drive: 6 plays, 69 yards, 2:03.
- EWU – Kevin Allen III 10-yard run (Soren McKee kick), 1:16. Grizzlies 22–14. Drive: 9 plays, 80 yards, 4:16.

Third quarter

- MONT – Eli Gillman 25-yard run (Ty Morrison kick), 12:34. Grizzlies 29–14. Drive: 3 plays, 65 yards, 1:04.
- EWU – Soren McKee 24-yard field goal, 2:21. Grizzlies 29–17. Drive: 12 plays, 60 yards, 5:52.

Fourth quarter

- EWU – Cole Pruett 8-yard pass from Jake Schakel (Soren McKee kick), 1:01. Grizzlies 29–24. Drive: 11 plays, 63 yards, 2:36.

Statistics	EWU	MONT
First downs	27	13
Plays–yards	72–479	53–351
Rushes–yards	29–28	23–101
Passing yards	451	250
Passing: Comp–Att–Int	43–63–2	22–30–0
Turnovers	2	0
Time of possession	37:48	22:12

Team	Category	Player	Statistics
Eastern Washington	Passing	Jake Schakel	43/63, 451 yards, 2 TD, 2 INT
Eastern Washington	Rushing	Kevin Allen III	12 carries, 57 yards, TD
Eastern Washington	Receiving	Miles Williams	11 receptions, 136 yards
Montana	Passing	Keali'i Ah Yat	22/30, 250 yards, 2 TD
Montana	Rushing	Eli Gillman	13 carries, 83 yards, TD
Montana	Receiving	Michael Wortham	5 receptions, 81 yards, TD

=== Northern Colorado ===
Northern Colorado Bears (3–7) at Eastern Washington Eagles (4–6) – Game summary

Quarter	1	2	3	4	Total
Bears	0	7	0	0	7
Eagles	3	17	7	0	27

at Roos Field • Cheney, WA

- Date: November 15
- Game time: 1:00 PM PST
- Game weather: Cloudy • Temperature: 53 °F (12 °C)
- Game attendance: 4,300
- Referee: Robert Quello
- TV: ESPN+

Game information

First quarter

- EWU – Soren McKee 38-yard field goal, 6:42. Eagles 3–0. Drive: 9 plays, 42 yards, 4:01.

Second quarter

- UNCO – Carver Cheeks 12-yard pass from Eric Gibson Jr. (Jacob Willig kick), 14:50. Bears 7–3. Drive: 2 plays, 10 yards, 0:40.
- EWU – Cole Pruett 12-yard pass from Jake Schakel (Soren McKee kick), 11:00. Eagles 10–7. Drive: 9 plays, 75 yards, 3:50.
- EWU – Nolan Ulm 14-yard pass from Jake Schakel (Soren McKee kick), 3:07. Eagles 17–7. Drive: 7 plays, 48 yards, 1:50.
- EWU – Soren McKee 22-yard field goal, 0:@3. Eagles 20–7. Drive: 12 plays, 59 yards, 1:49.

Third quarter

- EWU – Kevin Allen III 1-yard run (Soren McKee kick), 9:45. Eagles 27–7. Drive: 12 plays, 80 yards, 5:09.

Fourth quarter

- No scoring plays.

Statistics	UNCO	EWU
First downs	18	25
Plays–yards	68–326	71–374
Rushes–yards	32–131	28–75
Passing yards	195	299
Passing: Comp–Att–Int	21–36–5	31–43–1
Turnovers	5	1
Time of possession	31:04	28:56

Team	Category	Player	Statistics
Northern Colorado	Passing	Eric Gibson Jr.	13/19, 108 yards, TD, 2 INT
Northern Colorado	Rushing	Brandon Johnson	7 carries, 41 yards
Northern Colorado	Receiving	Brayden Munroe	6 receptions, 59 yards
Eastern Washington	Passing	Jake Schakel	31/41, 299 yards, 2 TD, INT
Eastern Washington	Rushing	Kaden Rolfsness	8 carries, 36 yards
Eastern Washington	Receiving	Miles Williams	6 receptions, 94 yards

=== at Cal Poly ===
Eastern Washington Eagles (5–6) at Cal Poly Mustangs (3–8) – Game summary

Quarter	1	2	3	4	Total
Eagles	14	10	10	0	34
Mustangs	21	6	3	13	43

at Alex G. Spanos Stadium • San Luis Obispo, CA

- Date: November 22
- Game time: 2:00 PM PST
- Game weather: Sunny • Temperature: 70 °F (21 °C) • Wind: NW at 10 miles per hour (16 km/h)
- Game attendance: 6,732
- Referee: Spencer Mumford
- TV: ESPN+

Game information

First quarter

- CP – Logan Booher 31-yard pass from Anthony Grigsby Jr. (Noah Serna kick), 14:24. Mustangs 7–0. Drive: 1 play, 31 yards, 0:05.
- CP – Antonio Vakameilalo 1-yard run (Gianluca Dimauro kick), 7:50. Mustangs 14–0. Drive: 12 plays, 53 yards, 4:29.
- EWU – Kaden Rolfsness 7-yard run (Soren McKee kick), 4:24. Mustangs 14–7. Drive: 4 plays, 22 yards, 1:27.
- CP – Alek Marshall 54-yard pass from Anthony Grigsby Jr. (Noah Serna kick), 2:51. Mustangs 21–7. Drive: 4 plays, 75 yards, 1:33.
- EWU – Kaden Rolfsness 1-yard run (Soren McKee kick), 1:25. Mustangs 21–14. Drive: 3 plays, 6 yards, 1:13.

Second quarter

- CP – Noah Serna 32-yard field goal, 9:22. Mustangs 24–14. Drive: 10 plays, 32 yards, 3:44.
- EWU – Noah Cronquist 12-yard pass from Kaden Rolfsness (Soren McKee kick), 4:51. Mustangs 24–21. Drive: 10 plays, 62 yards, 4:25.
- CP – Gianluca Dimauro 48-yard field goal, 0:16. Mustangs 27–21. Drive: 7 plays, 14 yards, 0:46.
- EWU – Soren McKee 50-yard field goal, 0:00. Mustangs 27–24. Drive: 2 plays, 18 yards, 0:12.

Third quarter

- EWU – Soren McKee 32-yard field goal, 8:09. Tied 27–27. Drive: 9 plays, 40 yards, 2:32.
- CP – Noah Serna 44-yard field goal, 5:22. Mustangs 30–27. Drive: 6 plays, 49 yards, 2:47.
- EWU – Kaden Rolfsness 13-yard run (Soren McKee kick), 2:56. Eagles 34–30. Drive: 8 plays, 57 yards, 2:21.

Fourth quarter

- CP – Fidel Tau Pitts 16-yard pass from Anthony Grigsby Jr. (Noah Serna kick), 13:50. Mustangs 37–34. Drive: 11 plays, 75 yards, 4:06.
- CP – Tyrei Washington 33-yard run (Noah Serna kick BLOCKED), 7:06. Mustangs 43–34. Drive: 5 plays, 56 yards, 1:29.

Statistics	EWU	CP
First downs	18	22
Plays–yards	74–318	87–500
Rushes–yards	32–82	50–159
Passing yards	236	341
Passing: Comp–Att–Int	23–42–3	21–37–2
Turnovers	3	4
Time of possession	27:28	32:32

Team	Category	Player	Statistics
Eastern Washington	Passing	Kaden Rolfsness	23/42, 236 yards, TD, 3 INT
Eastern Washington	Rushing	Kaden Rolfsness	19 carries, 56 yards, 3 TD
Eastern Washington	Receiving	Wesley Garrett	5 receptions, 63 yards
Cal Poly	Passing	Anthony Grigsby Jr.	21/37, 341 yards, 3 TD, 2 INT
Cal Poly	Rushing	Tyrei Washington	21 carries, 99 yards, TD
Cal Poly	Receiving	Logan Booher	7 receptions, 126 yards, TD
