= 2025 Idaho State Bengals football team =

American college football season

2025 Idaho State Bengals football
- Conference: Big Sky Conference
- Record: 6–6 (5–3 Big Sky)
- Head coach: Cody Hawkins (3rd season)
- Co-offensive coordinator: Buddy Blevins (2nd season)
- Offensive scheme: Run and shoot
- Defensive coordinator: Grant Duff (1st season)
- Base defense: Multiple
- Home stadium: ICCU Dome

2025 Big Sky Conference football standings
	Conf.			Overall
Team	W		L	W		L
No. 1 Montana State $^	8	–	0	14	–	2
No. 3 Montana ^	7	–	1	13	–	2
No. 8 UC Davis ^	6	–	2	9	–	4
Sacramento State	5	–	3	7	–	5
Idaho State	5	–	3	6	–	6
Northern Arizona	4	–	4	7	–	5
Eastern Washington	4	–	4	5	–	7
Cal Poly	2	–	6	4	–	8
Idaho	2	–	6	4	–	8
Northern Colorado	2	–	6	4	–	8
Weber State	2	–	6	4	–	8
Portland State	1	–	7	1	–	11
$ – Conference champion; ^ – FCS playoff participant; Rankings from STATS Poll

The 2025 Idaho State Bengals football team represented Idaho State University as a member of the Big Sky Conference during the 2025 NCAA Division I FCS football season. The Bengals were led by third-year head coach Cody Hawkins and played at the ICCU Dome in Pocatello, Idaho.

The Bengals finished the season with an overall record of 6–6 for the program's first non-losing season since 2018.

== Schedule ==
Date	Time	Opponent	Site	TV	Result	Attendance
August 23	2:00 p.m.	at UNLV*	Allegiant Stadium; Paradise, NV	MW Network	L 31–38	25,723
August 30	6:30 p.m.	at Southern Utah*	Eccles Coliseum; Cedar City, UT	ESPN+	L 24–46	5,137
September 6	1:00 p.m.	at New Mexico*	University Stadium; Albuquerque, NM	Altitude	L 22–32	17,639
September 20	4:00 p.m.	Lincoln (CA)*	ICCU Dome; Pocatello, ID	ESPN+	W 90–0	6,203
September 27	1:00 p.m.	at Northern Colorado	Nottingham Field; Greeley, CO	ESPN+	W 26–18	5,386
October 4	6:00 p.m.	No. 4 Montana	ICCU Dome; Pocatello, ID	ESPN+	L 38–42	7,674
October 11	1:00 p.m.	at No. 5 Montana State	Bobcat Stadium; Bozeman, MT	ESPN+	L 14–48	22,267
October 25	4:00 p.m.	No. 20 Northern Arizona^{†}	ICCU Dome; Pocatello, ID	ESPN+	L 18–31	9,861
November 1	2:00 p.m.	at No. 6 UC Davis	UC Davis Health Stadium; Davis, CA	ESPN+	W 38–36	10,973
November 8	4:00 p.m.	Cal Poly	ICCU Dome; Pocatello, ID	ESPN+	W 27–17	5,646
November 15	4:00 p.m.	Weber State	ICCU Dome; Pocatello, ID	ESPN+	W 31–3	7,367
November 22	2:00 p.m.	at Idaho	Kibbie Dome; Moscow, ID (rivalry)	ESPN+	W 37–16	7,428
*Non-conference game; ^{†}Homecoming; Rankings from STATS Poll released prior to the game; All times are in Mountain time

== Game summaries ==
=== at UNLV (FBS) ===
Idaho State Bengals (0–0) at UNLV Rebels (FBS) (0–0) – Game summary

Quarter	1	2	3	4	Total
Bengals	10	7	7	7	31
Rebels (FBS)	0	14	10	14	38

at Allegiant Stadium • Paradise, Nevada

- Date: August 23
- Game time: 2:00 p.m. MDT / 1:00 p.m. PDT
- Game weather: None (played indoors)
- Game attendance: 25,723
- Referee: Christian Watson
- TV announcers (MW Network): Matt Neverett (play-by-play), Caleb Herring (analyst) and Steve Cofield (sideline)

Game information

First quarter

- IDST – Trajan Sinatra 26-yard field goal, 11:14. Bengals 3–0. Drive: 10 plays, 67 yards, 3:46.
- IDST – Jordan Cooke 15-yard pass from Michael Shulikov (Trajan Sinatra kick), 5:49. Bengals 10–0. Drive: 6 plays, 80 yards, 2:54.

Second quarter

- UNLV – Jai'Den Thomas 3-yard run (Ramon Villela kick), 10:34. Bengals 10–7. Drive: 5 plays, 64 yards, 2:06.
- UNLV – Jai'Den Thomas 70-yard run (Ramon Villela kick), 7:12. Rebels 14–10. Drive: 4 plays, 80 yards, 1:38.
- IDST – Dason Brooks 27-yard run (Trajan Sinatra kick), 2:06. Bengals 17–14. Drive: 5 plays, 50 yards, 1:31.

Third quarter

- UNLV – Jai'Den Thomas 3-yard run (Ramon Villela kick), 11:57. Rebels 21–17. Drive: 9 plays, 93 yards, 2:53.
- UNLV – Ramon Villela 26-yard field goal, 6:00. Rebels 24–17. Drive: 7 plays, 71 yards, 2:28.
- IDST – Ian Duarte 64-yard pass from Jordan Cooke (Trajan Sinatra kick), 4:15. Tied 24–24. Drive: 5 plays, 81 yards, 1:38.

Fourth quarter

- IDST – Dason Brooks 2-yard run (Trajan Sinatra kick), 13:40. Bengals 31–24. Drive: 11 plays, 75 yards, 3:42.
- UNLV – Daejon Reynolds 9-yard pass from Anthony Colandrea (Ramon Villela kick), 11:26. Tied 31–31. Drive: 6 plays, 75 yards, 2:14.
- UNLV – Alex Orji 11-yard run (Ramon Villela kick), 8:51. Rebels 38–31. Drive: 4 plays, 20 yards, 1:44.

Statistics	IDST	UNLV
First downs	30	25
Plays–yards	77–555	68–532
Rushes–yards	25–160	44–300
Passing yards	395	232
Passing: Comp–Att–Int	31–52–4	18–24–0
Turnovers	4	1
Time of possession	28:48	31:12

Team	Category	Player	Statistics
Idaho State	Passing	Jordan Cooke	30/50, 380 yards, TD, 3 INT
Idaho State	Rushing	Dason Brooks	18 carries, 132 yards, 2 TD
Idaho State	Receiving	Ian Duarte	6 receptions, 105 yards, TD
UNLV	Passing	Anthony Colandrea	15/21, 195 yards, TD
UNLV	Rushing	Jai'Den Thomas	10 carries, 147 yards, 3 TD
UNLV	Receiving	Jaden Bradley	6 receptions, 131 yards

=== at Southern Utah ===
Idaho State Bengals (0–1) at Southern Utah Thunderbirds (0–0) – Game summary

Quarter	1	2	3	4	Total
Bengals	0	14	7	3	24
Thunderbirds	15	10	14	7	46

at Eccles Coliseum • Cedar City, Utah

- Date: August 30
- Game time: 6:30 p.m. MDT
- Game attendance: 5,137
- Referee: Zachary Erdman
- TV: ESPN+

Game information

First quarter

- SUU – Gabe Nunez 22-yard pass from Bronson Barron (Bronson Barron–Gabe Nunez pass), 10:32. Thunderbirds 8–0. Drive: 5 plays, 52 yards, 2:26.
- SUU – Mark Bails 13-yard pass from Bronson Barron (Jayden Rogers kick), 3:06. Thunderbirds 15–0. Drive: 7 plays, 60 yards, 3:02.

Second quarter

- SUU – Joshua Dye 32-yard run (Jayden Rogers kick), 13:19. Thunderbirds 22–0. Drive: 4 plays, 67 yards, 1:27.
- IDST – Damien Morgan 19-yard pass from Jordan Cooke (Trajan Sinatra kick), 10:35. Thunderbirds 22–7. Drive: 7 plays, 75 yards, 2:44.
- IDST – Mason Young 15-yard fumble return (Trajan Sinatra kick), 10:20. Thunderbirds 22–14.
- SUU – Jayden Rogers 20-yard field goal, 4:45. Thunderbirds 25–14. Drive: 10 plays, 72 yards, 5:35.

Third quarter

- SUU – Niko Alailefaleula 4-yard pass from Bronson Barron (Jayden Rogers kick), 9:45. Thunderbirds 32–14. Drive: 10 plays, 75 yards, 5:15.
- SUU – Will Burns 72-yard run (Jayden Rogers kick), 7:01. Thunderbirds 39–14. Drive: 4 plays, 91 yards, 2:13.
- IDST – Brett Spencer 1-yard run (Trajan Sinatra kick), 2:59. Thunderbirds 39–21. Drive: 9 plays, 75 yards, 4:02.

Fourth quarter

- IDST – Trajan Sinatra 40-yard field goal, 14:45. Thunderbirds 39–24. Drive: 9 plays, 57 yards, 1:48.
- SUU – Joshua Dye 19-yard run (Jayden Rogers kick), 4:04. Thunderbirds 46–24. Drive: 11 plays, 98 yards, 6:14.

Statistics	IDST	SUU
First downs	19	28
Plays–yards	66–361	75–563
Rushes–yards	16–23	50–323
Passing yards	338	240
Passing: Comp–Att–Int	24–50–1	19–25–0
Turnovers	1	1
Time of possession	22:47	37:13

Team	Category	Player	Statistics
Idaho State	Passing	Jordan Cooke	23/45, 334 yards, TD, INT
Idaho State	Rushing	Tytan Mason	3 carries, 15 yards
Idaho State	Receiving	Michael Shulikov	7 receptions, 115 yards
Southern Utah	Passing	Bronson Barron	19/25, 240 yards, 3 TD
Southern Utah	Rushing	Joshua Dye	28 carries, 180 yards, 2 TD
Southern Utah	Receiving	Shane Carr	6 receptions, 77 yards

=== at New Mexico (FBS) ===
Idaho State Bengals (0–2) at New Mexico Lobos (FBS) (0–1) – Game summary

Quarter	1	2	3	4	Total
Bengals	0	10	6	6	22
Lobos (FBS)	7	7	3	15	32

at University Stadium • Albuquerque, New Mexico

- Date: September 6, 2025
- Game time: 1:00 p.m. MDT
- Game attendance: 17,639
- Referee: Gary Reed
- TV announcers (Altitude): Robert Portnoy (play-by-play) and DonTrell Moore (analyst)

Game information

First quarter

- UNM – Jack Layne 7-yard run (Luke Drzewiecki kick), 0:21. Lobos 7–0. Drive: 10 plays, 98 yards, 5:04.

Second quarter

- IDST – Trajan Sinatra 27-yard field goal, 8:56. Lobos 7–3. Drive: 13 plays, 70 yards, 6:21.
- UNM – Scottre Humphrey 61-yard run (Luke Drzewiecki kick), 7:34. Lobos 14–3. Drive: 3 plays, 69 yards, 1:22.
- IDST – Michael Shulikov 30-yard pass from Davis Harsin (Trajan Sinatra kick), 1:03. Lobos 14–10. Drive: 6 plays, 67 yards, 1:29.

Third quarter

- IDST – Trajan Sinatra 56-yard field goal, 10:30. Lobos 14–13. Drive: 6 plays, 16 yards, 2:17.
- IDST – Trajan Sinatra 33-yard field goal, 5:25. Bengals 16–14. Drive: 7 plays, 27 yards, 3:23.
- UNM – Luke Drzewiecki 21-yard field goal, 0:13. Lobos 17–16. Drive: 9 plays, 45 yards, 5:04.

Fourth quarter

- IDST – Tytan Mason 3-yard run (pass failed), 10:40. Bengals 22–17. Drive: 11 plays, 75 yards, 4:33.
- UNM – Damon Bankston 1-yard run (Jack Layne–Dorian Thomas pass), 7:17. Lobos 25–22. Drive: 9 plays, 70 yards, 3:16.
- UNM – Scottre Humphrey 1-yard run (Luke Drzewiecki kick), 1:48. Lobos 32–22. Drive: 9 plays, 58 yards, 3:40.

Statistics	IDST	UNM
First downs	21	20
Total yards	386	371
Rushes–yards	31–121	40–216
Passing yards	265	155
Passing: Comp–Att–Int	28–39–1	13–21–0
Turnovers	1	1
Time of possession	30:31	29:29

Team	Category	Player	Statistics
Idaho State	Passing	Davis Harsin	17/26, 181 yards, TD, INT
Idaho State	Rushing	Davis Harsin	11 carries, 60 yards
Idaho State	Receiving	Michael Shulikov	4 receptions, 74 yards, TD
New Mexico	Passing	Jack Layne	13/21, 155 yards
New Mexico	Rushing	Scottre Humphrey	18 carries, 141 yards, 2 TD
New Mexico	Receiving	Dorian Thomas	5 receptions, 56 yards

=== Lincoln (CA) ===
Lincoln Oaklanders (0–3) at Idaho State Bengals (0–3) – Game summary

Quarter	1	2	3	4	Total
Oaklanders	0	0	0	0	0
Bengals	27	42	14	7	90

at ICCU Dome • Pocatello, ID

- Date: September 20
- Game time: 4:00 p.m. MDT
- Game weather: None (played indoors)
- Game attendance: 6,203
- Referee: Justin Robinson
- TV announcers (ESPN+): Scott Gross (play by play) and Kody Graves (analyst)

Game information

First quarter

- IDST – Michael Shulikov 47-yard pass from Davis Harsin (Trajan Sinatra kick BLOCKED), 7:44. Bengals 6–0. Drive: 6 plays, 69 yards, 2:01.
- IDST – Damien Morgan 17-yard pass from Davis Harsin (Trajan Sinatra kick), 5:26. Bengals 13–0. Drive: 6 plays, 54 yards, 2:16.
- IDST – Carson Sudbury 12-yard run (Trajan Sinatra kick), 4:37. Bengals 20–0. Drive: 3 plays, 35 yards, 0:47.
- IDST – Aidan Garcia 0-yard fumble return (Trajan Sinatra kick), 2:21. Bengals 27–0.

Second quarter

- IDST – Dason Brooks 4-yard run (Trajan Sinatra kick), 14:06. Bengals 34–0. Drive: 6 plays, 37 yards, 2:21.
- IDST – Carson Sudbury 30-yard run (Trajan Sinatra kick), 13:51. Bengals 41–0. Drive: 1 play, 30 yards, 0:10.
- IDST – Tsion Nunnally 11-yard pass from Jordan Cooke (Trajan Sinatra kick), 10:51. Bengals 48–0. Drive: 3 plays, 66 yards, 1:20.
- IDST – Michael Shulikov 11-yard pass from Davis Harsin (Mason Lindberg kick), 10:23. Bengals 55–0. Drive: 4 plays, 11 yards, 0:15.
- IDST – Raiden Brown 45-yard pass from Davis Harsin (Trajan Sinatra kick), 8:38. Bengals 62–0. Drive: 1 play, 45 yards, 0:09.
- IDST – Raiden Brown 8-yard pass from Davis Harsin (Mason Lindberg kick), 5:23. Bengals 69–0. Drive: 2 plays, 26 yards, 0:39.

Third quarter

- IDST – Aidan Garcia 15-yard pass from Davis Harsin (Trajan Sinatra kick), 6:45. Bengals 76–0. Drive: 4 plays, 53 yards, 1:07.
- IDST – Brett Spencer 3-yard run (Mason Lindberg kick), 0:22. Bengals 83–0. Drive: 2 plays, 45 yards, 0:53.

Fourth quarter

- IDST – Jaylin Wilson 1-yard run (Trajan Sinatra kick), 1:03. Bengals 90–0. Drive: 9 plays, 78 yards, 4:41.

Statistics	LCLN	IDST
First downs	13	25
Plays–yards	59–214	47–521
Rushes–yards	25–6	27–281
Passing yards	208	240
Passing: Comp–Att–Int	20–34–2	15–20–0
Turnovers	4	0
Time of possession	36:13	23:47

Team	Category	Player	Statistics
Lincoln (CA)	Passing	Rob Brazziel	14/23, 158 yards, 2 INT
Lincoln (CA)	Rushing	Jaylin McCray	7 carries, 11 yards
Lincoln (CA)	Receiving	Trey Dimmings	2 receptions, 50 yards
Idaho State	Passing	Davis Harsin	10/13, 195 yards, 6 TD
Idaho State	Rushing	Dason Brooks	6 carries, 83 yards, TD
Idaho State	Receiving	Raiden Brown	3 receptions, 70 yards, 2 TD

=== at Northern Colorado ===
Idaho State Bengals (1–3) at Northern Colorado Bears (2–2) – Game summary

Quarter	1	2	3	4	Total
Bengals	10	13	3	0	26
Bears	0	7	8	3	18

at Nottingham Field • Greeley, Colorado

- Date: September 27
- Game time: 1:00 p.m. MDT
- Game attendance: 5,386
- Referee: Spencer Mumford
- TV: ESPN+

Game information

First quarter

- IDST – Trajan Sinatra 26-yard field goal, 9:59. Bengals 3–0. Drive: 13 plays, 66 yards, 5:01.
- IDST – Carson Sudbury 6-yard run (Trajan Sinatra kick), 6:36. Bengals 10–0. Drive: 7 plays, 31 yards, 1:31.

Second quarter

- IDST – Trajan Sinatra 27-yard field goal, 13:09. Bengals 13–0. Drive: 16 plays, 65 yards, 5:29.
- IDST – Trajan Sinatra 49-yard field goal, 7:34. Bengals 16–0. Drive: 8 plays, 43 yards, 2:10.
- UNCO – Charles Garrison 36-yard pass from Eric Gibson Jr. (Jacob Willig kick), 2:12. Bengals 16–7. Drive: 6 plays, 95 yards, 1:43.
- IDST – Tsion Nunnally 33-yard pass from Jordan Cooke (Trajan Sinatra kick), 0:02. Bengals 23–7. Drive: 4 plays, 80 yards, 0:37.

Third quarter

- UNCO – Carver Cheeks 9-yard pass from Eric Gibson Jr. (Eric Gibson Jr. pass to Dawson Menegatti), 4:59. Bengals 23–15. Drive: 9 plays, 66 yards, 3:35.
- IDST – Trajan Sinatra 48-yard field goal, 2:10. Bengals 26–15. Drive: 7 plays, 63 yards, 2:46.

Fourth quarter

- UNCO – Jacob Willig 29-yard field goal, 4:34. Bengals 26–18. Drive: 7 plays, 68 yards, 2:09.

Statistics	IDST	UNCO
First downs	25	16
Plays–yards	84–539	67–426
Rushes–yards	43–289	28–30
Passing yards	250	396
Passing: Comp–Att–Int	14–41–0	26–39–0
Turnovers	1	1
Time of possession	32:57	27:03

Team	Category	Player	Statistics
Idaho State	Passing	Jordan Cooke	12/33, 209 yards, TD
Idaho State	Rushing	Dason Brooks	26 carries, 161 yards
Idaho State	Receiving	Michael Shulikov	2 receptions, 77 yards
Northern Colorado	Passing	Eric Gibson Jr.	26/39, 396 yards, 2 TD
Northern Colorado	Rushing	Mathias Price	12 carries, 30 yards
Northern Colorado	Receiving	Carver Cheeks	7 receptions, 93 yards, TD

=== No. 4 Montana ===
No. 4 Montana Grizzlies (4–0) at Idaho State Bengals (2–3) – Game summary

Quarter	1	2	3	4	Total
No. 4 Grizzlies	10	8	10	14	42
Bengals	10	14	14	0	38

at ICCU Dome • Pocatello, Idaho

- Date: October 4
- Game time: 6:00 p.m. MDT
- Game weather: None (played indoors)
- Game attendance: 7,674
- Referee: Mike Bezner
- TV: ESPN+

Game information

First quarter

- (11:13) MONT – Michael Wortham 21-yard run, Ty Morrison kick (Drive: 8 plays, 75 yards, 3:47; Montana 7–0)
- (6:59) IDST – Dason Brooks 8-yard run, Trajan Sinatra kick (Drive: 9 plays, 88 yards, 4:09; Tied 7–7)
- (3:45) MONT – Ty Morrison 37-yard field goal (Drive: 8 plays, 50 yards, 3:08; Montana 10–7)
- (0:15) IDST – Trajan Sinatra 42-yard field goal (Drive: 9 plays, 51 yards, 3:30; Tied 10–10)

Second quarter

- (11:26) IDST – Carson Sudbury 3-yard run, Trajan Sinatra kick (Drive: 9 plays, 72 yards, 3:19; Idaho State 17–10)
- (6:05) MONT – Josh Gale 16-yard pass from Michael Wortham, Brooks Davis rush (Drive: 12 plays, 74 yards, 5:15; Montana 18–17)
- (3:57) IDST – Julian Mason 30-yard pass from Jordan Cooke, Trajan Sinatra kick (Drive: 5 plays, 75 yards, 2:08; Idaho State 24–18)

Third quarter

- (12:09) IDST – Dason Brooks 3-yard run, Trajan Sinatra kick (Drive: 7 plays, 75 yards, 2:51; Idaho State 31–18)
- (9:05) MONT – Eli Gillman 4-yard pass from Keali'i Ah Yat, Ty Morrison kick (Drive: 7 plays, 65 yards, 2:57; Idaho State 31–25)
- (6:16) MONT – Ty Morrison 35-yard field goal (Drive: 6 plays, 45 yards, 1:31; Idaho State 31–28)
- (0:52) IDST – Tsion Nunnally 22-yard pass from Jordan Cooke, Trajan Sinatra kick (Drive: 3 plays, 33 yards, 0:39; Idaho State 38–28)

Fourth quarter

- (14:22) MONT – Eli Gillman 5-yard run, Ty Morrison kick (Drive: 5 plays, 60 yards, 1:25; Idaho State 38–35)
- (3:06) MONT – Michael Wortham 9-yard run, Ty Morrison kick (Drive: 5 plays, 52 yards, 2:11; Montana 42–38)

Statistics	MONT	IDST
First downs	25	28
Plays–yards	78–517	77–497
Rushes–yards	35–118	23–76
Passing yards	399	421
Passing: Comp–Att–Int	25–43–1	33–54–1
Turnovers	1	1
Time of possession	29:43	30:17

Team	Category	Player	Statistics
Montana	Passing	Keali'i Ah Yat	23/40, 350 yards, TD, INT
Montana	Rushing	Eli Gillman	16 carries, 48 yards, TD
Montana	Receiving	Michael Wortham	6 receptions, 124 yards
Idaho State	Passing	Jordan Cooke	33/54, 421 yards, 2 TD, INT
Idaho State	Rushing	Dason Brooks	15 carries, 51 yards, 2 TD
Idaho State	Receiving	Michael Shulikov	8 receptions, 119 yards

=== at No. 5 Montana State ===
Idaho State Bengals (2–4) at No. 5 Montana State Bobcats (4–2) – Game summary

Quarter	1	2	3	4	Total
Bengals	7	7	0	0	14
No. 5 Bobcats	14	20	7	7	48

at Bobcat Stadium • Bozeman, Montana

- Date: October 11
- Game time: 1:00 p.m. MDT
- Game weather: Cloudy, 53 °F (12 °C)
- Game attendance: 22,267
- Referee: Robert Quello
- TV: ESPN+

Game information

First quarter

- MTST – Julius Davis 22-yard pass from Justin Lamson (Myles Sansted kick), 12:22. Bobcats 7–0. Drive: 6 plays, 75 yards, 2:38.
- MTST – Dane Steel 15-yard pass from Justin Lamson (Myles Sansted kick), 8:17. Bobcats 14–0. Drive: 5 plays, 74 yards, 2:29.
- IDST – Michael Shulikov 7-yard pass from Jordan Cooke (Trajan Sinatra kick), 1:13. Bobcats 14–7. Drive: 9 plays, 65 yards, 3:24.

Second quarter

- MTST – Adam Jones 24-yard run (Myles Sansted kick failed), 14:21. Bobcats 20–7. Drive: 5 plays, 75 yards, 1:52.
- IDST – Tsion Nunnally 69-yard pass from Jordan Cooke (Trajan Sinatra kick), 13:47. Bobcats 20–14. Drive: 2 plays, 75 yards, 0:34.
- MTST – Justin Lamson 7-yard run (Myles Sansted kick), 5:54. Bobcats 27–14. Drive: 13 plays, 75 yards, 7:53.
- MTST – Rocky Lencioni 13-yard pass from Justin Lamson (Myles Sansted kick), 0:25. Bobcats 34–14. Drive: 11 plays, 94 yards, 3:28.

Third quarter

- MTST – Rocky Lencioni 22-yard pass from Justin Lamson (Myles Sansted kick), 3:49. Bobcats 41–14. Drive: 10 plays, 80 yards, 4:21.

Fourth quarter

- MTST – Patrick Duchien 4-yard run (Myles Sansted kick), 2:37. Bobcats 48–14. Drive: 3 plays, 38 yards, 1:16.

Statistics	IDST	MTST
First downs	17	35
Plays–yards	65–404	74–568
Rushes–yards	17–36	53–384
Passing yards	368	184
Passing: Comp–Att–Int	26–48–2	17–21–0
Turnovers	3	0
Time of possession	24:22	35:38

Team	Category	Player	Statistics
Idaho State	Passing	Jordan Cooke	20/37, 307 yards, 2 TD, INT
Idaho State	Rushing	Carson Sudburry	6 carries, 16 yards
Idaho State	Receiving	Tsion Nunnally	9 receptions, 169 yards, TD
Montana State	Passing	Justin Lamson	17/21, 184 yards, 4 TD
Montana State	Rushing	Adam Jones	16 carries, 173 yards, TD
Montana State	Receiving	Taco Dowler	6 receptions, 45 yards

=== No. 20 Northern Arizona ===
No. 20 Northern Arizona Lumberjacks (4–3) at Idaho State Bengals (2–5) – Game summary

Quarter	1	2	3	4	Total
No. 20 Lumberjacks	7	14	0	10	31
Bengals	7	3	0	8	18

at ICCU Dome • Pocatello, Idaho

- Date: October 25
- Game time: 4:00 p.m. MDT
- Game weather: None (played indoors)
- Game attendance: 9,861
- Referee: Robert Quello
- TV: ESPN+

Game information

First quarter

- IDST – Dason Brooks 6-yard run (Trajan Sinatra kick), 7:15. Bengals 7–0. Drive: 6 plays, 45 yards, 2:48.
- NAU – Seth Cromwell 8-yard run (Samuel Hunsaker kick), 4:19. Tied 7–7. Drive: 6 plays, 75 yards, 2:56.

Second quarter

- IDST – Trajan Sinatra 40-yard field goal, 10:59. Bengals 10–7. Drive: 7 plays, 20 yards, 2:32.
- NAU – Braden Kramer 14-yard pass from Ty Pennington (Samuel Hunsaker kick), 3:51. Lumberjacks 14–10. Drive: 14 plays, 75 yards, 7:08.
- NAU – Darvon Hubbard 4-yard run (Samuel Hunsaker kick), 1:14. Lumberjacks 21–10. Drive: 12 plays, 84 yards, 2:44.

Third quarter

- No scoring plays.

Fourth quarter

- NAU – Quran Gossett 3-yard run (Samuel Hunsaker kick), 11:23. Lumberjacks 28–10. Drive: 16 plays, 70 yards, 6:53.
- IDST – Michael Shulikov 23-yard pass from Jordan Cooke (Jordan Cook–Jonah Burton pass), 8:52. Lumberjacks 28–18. Drive: 8 plays, 73 yards, 2:24.
- NAU – Samuel Hunsaker 41-yard field goal, 4:10. Lumberjacks 31–18. Drive: 11 plays, 21 yards, 4:41.

Statistics	NAU	IDST
First downs	23	23
Plays–yards	70–371	62–393
Rushes–yards	45–200	23–137
Passing yards	171	256
Passing: Comp–Att–Int	24–30–0	26–39–1
Turnovers	0	2
Time of possession	34:37	25:23

Team	Category	Player	Statistics
Northern Arizona	Passing	Ty Pennington	24/30, 171 yards, TD
Northern Arizona	Rushing	Darvon Hubbard	8 carries, 66 yards, TD
Northern Arizona	Receiving	Kolbe Katsis	8 receptions, 68 yards
Idaho State	Passing	Jordan Cooke	26/39, 256 yards, TD, INT
Idaho State	Rushing	Dason Brooks	11 carries, 108 yards, TD
Idaho State	Receiving	Tsion Nunnally	8 receptions, 71 yards

=== at No. 6 UC Davis ===
Idaho State Bengals (2–6) at No. 6 UC Davis Aggies (6–1) – Game summary

Quarter	1	2	3	4	Total
Bengals	14	14	7	3	38
No. 6 Aggies	13	14	6	3	36

at UC Davis Health Stadium • Davis, California

- Date: November 1
- Game time: 2:00 p.m. MDT / 1:00 p.m. PDT
- Game weather: Sunny, 74 °F (23 °C)
- Game attendance: 10,973
- Referee: Jeff Rink
- TV: ESPN+

Game information

First quarter

- IDST – Dason Brooks 57-yard run (Trajan Sinatra kick), 13:33. Bengals 7–0. Drive: 4 plays, 75 yards, 1:27.
- UCD – Carter Vargas 2-yard run (kick blocked), 9:51. Bengals 7–6. Drive: 8 plays, 77 yards, 3:36.
- IDST – Tsion Nunnally 2-yard pass from Jordan Cooke (Trajan Sinatra kick), 6:26. Bengals 14–6. Drive: 9 plays, 74 yards, 3:18.
- UCD – Laviel Pickett 4-yard pass from Caden Pinnick (Hunter Ridley kick), 1:44. Bengals 14–13. Drive: 9 plays, 58 yards, 4:33.

Second quarter

- IDST – Dason Brooks 15-yard run (Trajan Sinatra kick), 14:54. Bengals 21–13. Drive: 7 plays, 85 yards, 1:48.
- UCD – Carter Vargas 7-yard run (Hunter Ridley kick), 12:25. Bengals 21–20. Drive: 6 plays, 75 yards, 2:29.
- IDST – Aidan Garcia 16-yard blocked punt return (Trajan Sinatra kick), 7:02. Bengals 28–20.
- UCD – Zach Jones 11-yard run (Hunter Ridley kick), 3:26. Bengals 28–27. Drive: 7 plays, 75 yards, 3:36.

Third quarter

- UCD – Hunter Ridley 23-yard field goal, 10:09. Aggies 30–28. Drive: 10 plays, 70 yards, 4:51.
- IDST – Michael Shulikov 35-yard pass from Jordan Cooke (Trajan Sinatra kick), 6:59. Bengals 35–30. Drive: 7 plays, 75 yards, 3:10.
- UCD – Hunter Ridley 26-yard field goal, 0:55. Bengals 35–33. Drive: 12 plays, 67 yards, 6:04.

Fourth quarter

- UCD – Hunter Ridley 46-yard field goal, 2:56. Aggies 36–35. Drive: 10 plays, 52 yards, 4:44.
- IDST – Trajan Sinatra 50-yard field goal, 0:52. Bengals 38–36. Drive: 7 plays, 35 yards, 2:00.

Statistics	IDST	UCD
First downs	22	33
Plays–yards	65–471	79–567
Rushes–yards	29–219	47–242
Passing yards	252	325
Passing: Comp–Att–Int	21–36–2	23–32–2
Turnovers	2	3
Time of possession	23:18	36:42

Team	Category	Player	Statistics
Idaho State	Passing	Jordan Cooke	21/36, 252 yards, 2 TD, 2 INT
Idaho State	Rushing	Dason Brooks	24 carries, 219 yards, 2 TD
Idaho State	Receiving	Tsion Nunnally	9 receptions, 119 yards, TD
UC Davis	Passing	Caden Pinnick	23/32, 325 yards, TD, 2 INT
UC Davis	Rushing	Jordan Fisher	22 carries, 108 yards
UC Davis	Receiving	Samuel Gbatu Jr.	6 receptions, 112 yards

=== Cal Poly ===
Cal Poly Mustangs (3–6) at Idaho State Bengals (3–6) – Game summary

Quarter	1	2	3	4	Total
Mustangs	0	7	3	7	17
Bengals	14	7	3	3	27

at ICCU Dome • Pocatello, Idaho

- Date: November 8
- Game time: 4:00 p.m. MST
- Game weather: None (played indoors)
- Game attendance: 5,646
- Referee: Gregg Wilson
- TV: ESPN+

Game information

First quarter

- IDST – Michael Shulikov 17-yard pass from Jordan Cooke (Trajan Sinatra kick), 12:55. Bengals 7–0. Drive: 6 plays, 74 yards, 2:00.
- IDST – Jordan Cooke 3-yard run (Trajan Sinatra kick), 4:53. Bengals 14–0. Drive: 12 plays, 91 yards, 5:09.

Second quarter

- CP – Ty Dieffenbach 17-yard run (Gianluca Dimauro kick), 1:31. Bengals 14–7. Drive: 8 plays, 80 yards, 2:47.
- IDST – Dason Brooks 5-yard run (Trajan Sinatra kick), 0:08. Bengals 21–7. Drive: 7 plays, 75 yards, 1:23.

Third quarter

- IDST – Trajan Sinatra 19-yard field goal, 7:44. Bengals 24–7. Drive: 12 plays, 48 yards, 5:40.
- CP – Noah Serna 36-yard field goal, 2:07. Bengals 24–10. Drive: 15 plays, 57 yards, 5:37.

Fourth quarter

- IDST – Trajan Sinatra 20-yard field goal, 9:54. Bengals 27–10. Drive: 14 plays, 72 yards, 7:13.
- CP – Fidel Tau Pitts 15-yard pass from Ty Dieffenbach (Gianluca Dimauro kick), 2:27. Bengals 27–17. Drive: 15 plays, 80 yards, 7:20.

Statistics	CP	IDST
First downs	23	28
Plays–yards	69–409	72–451
Rushes–yards	40–237	35–176
Passing yards	172	275
Passing: Comp–Att–Int	18–29–1	27–37–0
Turnovers	1	0
Time of possession	30:22	29:38

Team	Category	Player	Statistics
Cal Poly	Passing	Ty Dieffenbach	18/29, 172 yards, TD, INT
Cal Poly	Rushing	Ty Dieffenbach	18 carries, 142 yards, TD
Cal Poly	Receiving	Michael Briscoe	5 receptions, 81 yards
Idaho State	Passing	Jordan Cooke	27/37, 275 yards, TD
Idaho State	Rushing	Dason Brooks	20 carries, 106 yards, TD
Idaho State	Receiving	Michael Sulikov	4 receptions, 72 yards, TD

=== Weber State ===
Weber State Wildcats (3–7) at Idaho State Bengals (4–6) – Game summary

Quarter	1	2	3	4	Total
Wildcats	0	0	0	3	3
Bengals	7	14	10	0	31

at ICCU Dome • Pocatello, Idaho

- Date: November 15
- Game time: 4:00 p.m. MST
- Game weather: none (played indoors)
- Game attendance: 7,367
- Referee: John Doe
- TV: ESPN+

Game information

First quarter

- IDST – Jordan Cooke 2-yard run (Trajan Sinatra kick), 12:51. Bengals 7–0. Drive: 5 plays, 75 yards, 2:09.

Second quarter

- IDST – Dason Brooks 3-yard run (Trajan Sinatra kick), 13:11. Bengals 14–0. Drive: 5 plays, 80 yards, 1:49.
- IDST – Damien Morgan 29-yard pass from Jordan Cooke (Trajan Sinatra kick), 2:11. Bengals 21–0. Drive: 9 plays, 75 yards, 4:20.

Third quarter

- IDST – Trajan Sinatra 48-yard field goal, 6:46. Bengals 24–0. Drive: 10 plays, 39 yards, 4:06.
- IDST – Ian Duarte 11-yard pass from Jordan Cooke (Trajan Sinatra kick), 2:44. Bengals 31–0. Drive: 6 plays, 67 yards, 2:57.

Fourth quarter

- WEB – Sloan Calder 25-yard field goal, 10:19. Bengals 31–3. Drive: 14 plays, 67 yards, 7:25.

Statistics	WEB	IDST
First downs	11	27
Plays–yards	56–227	68–531
Rushes–yards	23–35	28–158
Passing yards	192	373
Passing: Comp–Att–Int	24–33–0	25–40–0
Turnovers	0	0
Time of possession	29:20	30:40

Team	Category	Player	Statistics
Weber State	Passing	Dijon Jennings	24/33, 192 yards
Weber State	Rushing	Dijon Jennings	10 carries, 22 yards
Weber State	Receiving	Robert Young	4 receptions, 39 yards
Idaho State	Passing	Jordan Cooke	24/39, 363 yards, 2 TD
Idaho State	Rushing	Jordan Cooke	11 carries, 65 yards, TD
Idaho State	Receiving	Damien Morgan	8 receptions, 122 yards, TD

=== at Idaho (rivalry) ===
Idaho State Bengals (5–6) at Idaho Vandals (4–7) – Game summary

Quarter	1	2	3	4	Total
Bengals	10	17	0	10	37
Vandals	0	0	8	8	16

at Kibbie Dome • Moscow, Idaho

- Date: November 21
- Game time: 2:00 p.m. MST / 1:00 p.m. PST
- Game weather: Indoor • Temperature: 75 °F (24 °C)
- Game attendance: 7,428
- Referee: Jeff Rink
- TV announcers (ESPN+): Noah Schmick (play-by-play) and Darren Arbet (analyst)

Game information

First quarter

- IDST - Trajan Sinatra 39-yard field goal, 10:17. Bengals 3-0. Drive: 12 plays, 53 yards, 4:43.
- IDST - Ian Duarte 14-yard pass from Jordan Cooke (Trajan Sinatra kick), 0:50. Bengals 10-0. Drive: 7 plays, 42 yards, 2:28.

Second quarter

- IDST - Jordan Cooke 1-yard run (Trajan Sinatra kick), 6:01. Bengals 17-0. Drive: 6 plays, 57 yards, 2:37.
- IDST - Tsion Nunally 30-yard pass from Jordan Cooke (Trajan Sinatra kick), 0:28. Bengals 24-0. Drive: 9 plays, 84 yards, 1:46.
- IDST - Trajan Sinatra 33-yard field goal, 0:00. Bengals 27-0. Drive: 4 plays, 49 yards, 0:25.

Third quarter

- IDHO - Nate Thomas 16-yard run (Rocco Koch run for two-point conversion), 3:36. Bengals 27-8. Drive: 5 plays, 61 yards, 3:23.

Fourth quarter

- IDST - Jordan Cooke 9-yard run (Trajan Sinatra kick), 11:47. Bengals 34-8. Drive: 15 plays, 75 yards, 6:49.
- IDST - Trajan Sinatra 19-yard field goal, 7:06. Bengals 37-8. Drive: 4 plays, 7 yards, 2:20.
- IDHO - Nolan McWilliams 21-yard pass from Sawyer Teeney (Sawyer Teeney pass from to Carlos Matheny for two-point conversion), 1:57. Bengals 37-16. Drive: 8 plays, 75 yards, 5:09.

Statistics	IDST	IDHO
First downs	24	13
Plays–yards	77–404	51–259
Rushes–yards	44–192	26–133
Passing yards	212	126
Passing: Comp–Att–Int	20-33-0	17-25-1
Turnovers	0	1
Time of possession	33:04	26:56

Team	Category	Player	Statistics
Idaho State	Passing	Jordan Cooke	20/33, 212 yards, 2 TD
Idaho State	Rushing	Dason Brooks	23 carries, 103 yards
Idaho State	Receiving	Tsion Nunally	6 receptions, 86 yards, TD
Idaho	Passing	Joshua Wood	9/13, 73 yards, INT
Idaho	Rushing	Nate Thomas	15 carries, 66 yards, TD
Idaho	Receiving	Nolan McWilliams	5 receptions, 49 yards, TD

== Roster ==
2025 Idaho State Bengals football team roster
Players
Coaches
Offense

Pos.	#	Name	Class
WR	0	Damien Morgan	Jr
QB	1	Jordan Cooke	Jr
QB	2	Brett Spencer	So
WR	4	Jonah Burton	Jr
RB	5	Robert Freeman IV	Jr
RB	6	Carson Sudbury	Fr
WR	7	Javoni Gardere	Jr
QB	8	Jackson Sharman	Fr
WR	9	Tsion Nunnally	Sr
QB	10	Logan Gonzalez	Jr
WR	11	Ian Duarte	So
WR	12	Domonick Ruiz	Fr
WR	13	Raiden Brown	Fr
WR	14	Michael Shulikov	Sr
QB	15	Wyatt Horton	Fr
QB	16	Davis Harsin	Fr
WR	17	Josh Ball	So
RB	20	Tytan Mason	Fr
WR	21	Jacob Martin	Fr
WR	22	Aidan Garcia	Jr
WR	23	Robbie Mascheroni	So
RB	24	Zack Homan	Fr
RB	25	Jackson Riddle	Fr
RB	28	Dason Brooks	Sr
RB	29	Aiden Brown	Fr
RB	30	Hunter Roddy	Jr
OL	50	Alex Ramirez	Sr
OL	51	Stryker Rashid	Jr
OL	53	Messiyah Moye	Sr
OL	54	Jorgen Miller	So
OL	55	Gunnar Clark	So
OL	57	Exander Miller	Fr
OL	58	Lukas Jackson	Fr
WR	59	Elijah Beamon	Fr
OL	60	Wyatt Orton	Fr
OL	61	Zachary Shiroma	Sr
OL	62	William Davis	So
OL	63	Logan Shearing	Fr
OL	65	Jaxsen Tuia	So
OL	66	Justin Frost	Fr
OL	67	Broox McGiven	So
OL	70	Trevor Hammond	Fr
OL	71	Messiah Johnson	Fr
OL	72	David Green	Fr
OL	75	Jake Hellmann	Sr
OL	76	Jaedon Garcia	Jr
OL	77	Osiel Moreno	Jr
OL	79	Rex Salas	Fr
WR	80	Julian Mason	Jr
WR	81	Braden Albrecht	So
WR	82	Tommy Poe	Fr
WR	83	Gared Wood	Fr
WR	84	Taylor Freeman	So
WR	85	Simeon Brown	Fr
WR	88	Kai Wheeler	Fr
WR	89	Adam Watts	Fr

Defense

Pos.	#	Name	Class
DL	0	Camron Willis	Sr
CB	1	Gabe Tahir	So
CB	2	Adonijah Richards	Jr
S	3	Janari Boone	Jr
CB	4	Jackson Daniels	So
LB	5	Jayden Bell	Jr
S	6	Troy Wilkey	Jr
LB	7	Nathan Reynolds	Jr
LB	8	Teilor Tuioti	Sr
LB	9	Devin Rodriguez	Fr
DL	10	Maka Tu'akoi	Sr
LB	11	Junior Damuni	Sr
DB	12	Davion Ross	GS
S	13	Dekker Hagler	Fr
DL	14	Leka Tu'akoi	So
CB	15	Noa Calaycay	So
LB	16	Amari Mazeke	So
S	17	Makeo Sneddon	So
LB	18	Jackson Irwin	Jr
CB	20	Jaylon Brown	Sr
S	21	Rylan Leathers	Fr
S	22	Mason Young	Sr
CB	23	Tre Shorty	Fr
S	24	Isaiah Cook	Fr
CB	26	Sanborne Melson	So
CB	27	Jaylin Wilson	Fr
LB	28	Trey Jacobsen	Fr
CB	29	Elfred Segbe	Jr
CB	30	Mike Lindsay	Fr
CB	31	Bryce McCray	Fr
LB	32	Ty Beadle	Fr
LB	34	Porter Lee	Fr
S	35	Jonathan Watts	So
DE	37	Luke Berry	So
S	40	Parker Graham	Fr
DL	42	Easton Cook	Jr
S	43	Elijah Anderson	Fr
LB	44	Jacob Perez	So
LB	46	Ryder Holt	Fr
DE	52	Po Mama	Fr
DL	56	Kanigh Snyder	Fr
DL	57	Frank Kissick	So
DL	59	Brady Phillips	So
DL	90	Beau Jaques	So
DL	92	Zion To'oto'o	Jr
DL	93	Jagger Childs	So
DL	94	Malik Richardson	Fr
DL	95	Cade Clyde	Fr
DL	96	Bronson Childs	Jr
DL	97	Collin Lewis	So
DL	98	Jake East	So
DL	99	Grant Hessler	Sr

Special teams

Pos.	#	Name	Class
K	26	Mason Lindberg	Fr
K	31	Matthew Sebade	Sr
P, K	34	Gabe Russo	So
K	36	Trajan Sinatra	So
LS	39	Jason Swigger	So
LS	45	Ryan Carter	So
LS	47	Maverick Harrington	So
P	48	Jinhyun Kang	Jr

Head coach

- Cody Hawkins

Coordinators/assistant coaches

- Buddy Blevins – Co-offensive coordinator/inside receivers
- Grant Duff – Defensive coordinator
- Scott Thiessen – Special teams coordinator/nickels
- Jacob Thomas – Running backs/run game coordinator
- Keith Price – Outside wide receivers/pass game coordinator
- John Hughes – Offensive line
- Devin Holiday – Cornerbacks
- Bobby Jay – Safeties/defensive pass game coordinator
- Ricky Ali'ifua – Defensive line
- Tipa Galeai – Assistant defensive line
- Samson Anguay – Assistant wide receivers/recruiting coordinator
- Jeff Pitman – Assistant head coach/director of football strength & conditioning & culture
- Dan Hawkins – Director of player & staff development
- Mason Randall – Assistant quarterbacks
- Kamden Garrett – Assistant cornerbacks
- Anthony Morales – Assistant offensive line
- Jarrett Meeker – Director of football operations
- Dustin Enslinger – Head athletic trainer
- Ryan Barker – Director of equipment operations
- Jonathan LeGrand – Strength assistant
- Kenton Bartlett – Graduate assistant - strength & conditioning
- Zeke Noa – Graduate assistant - strength & conditioning
- Blake Moore – Director of video
- Scott Atkinson – Special teams graduate assistant
- Dylan Reynolds – Special teams student assistant

Legend

- (C) Team captain
- (S) Suspended
- (I) Ineligible
- Injured
- Redshirt

Roster
Last update: August 24, 2025
