= 2025 Penn State Nittany Lions football team =

American college football season

2025 Penn State Nittany Lions football

Pinstripe Bowl champion

Pinstripe Bowl, W 22–10 vs. Clemson
- Conference: Big Ten Conference
- Record: 7–6 (3–6 Big Ten)
- Head coach: James Franklin (12th season; first 6 games); Terry Smith (interim, remainder of season)
- Offensive coordinator: Andy Kotelnicki (2nd season)
- Co-offensive coordinator: Ty Howle (3rd season)
- Offensive scheme: Pro spread
- Defensive coordinator: Jim Knowles (1st season)
- Co-defensive coordinator: Anthony Poindexter (5th season)
- Base defense: 4–2–5
- Captains: Drew Allar; Nick Dawkins; Dominic DeLuca; Zane Durant; Tyler Duzansky
- Home stadium: Beaver Stadium

2025 Big Ten Conference football standings
| | Conf. | | | Overall |
| Team | W | | L | W | | L |
|---|---|---|---|---|---|---|
| No. 1 Indiana y$#^ | 9 | – | 0 | 16 | – | 0 |
| No. 5 Ohio State y^ | 9 | – | 0 | 12 | – | 2 |
| No. 4 Oregon ^ | 8 | – | 1 | 13 | – | 2 |
| No. 21 Michigan | 7 | – | 2 | 9 | – | 4 |
| No. 20 USC | 7 | – | 2 | 9 | – | 4 |
| No. 17 Iowa | 6 | – | 3 | 9 | – | 4 |
| Illinois | 5 | – | 4 | 9 | – | 4 |
| Washington | 5 | – | 4 | 9 | – | 4 |
| Minnesota | 5 | – | 4 | 8 | – | 5 |
| Nebraska | 4 | – | 5 | 7 | – | 6 |
| Northwestern | 4 | – | 5 | 7 | – | 6 |
| Penn State | 3 | – | 6 | 7 | – | 6 |
| UCLA | 3 | – | 6 | 3 | – | 9 |
| Rutgers | 2 | – | 7 | 5 | – | 7 |
| Wisconsin | 2 | – | 7 | 4 | – | 8 |
| Maryland | 1 | – | 8 | 4 | – | 8 |
| Michigan State | 1 | – | 8 | 4 | – | 8 |
| Purdue | 0 | – | 9 | 2 | – | 10 |
Championship: Indiana 13, Ohio State 10
# – College Football Playoff champion; ^ – College Football Playoff participant; $ – Conference champion; y – Championship game participant; As of October 11, 2026; Rankings from AP Poll

The 2025 Penn State Nittany Lions football team represented Pennsylvania State University as a member of the Big Ten Conference during the 2025 NCAA Division I FBS football season. The team played home games at Beaver Stadium located in College Township, Pennsylvania, with a mailing address of University Park, Pennsylvania.

Despite high preseason expectations, including a No. 2 Week 0 ranking in the AP poll and a 3–0 start, Penn State's season would collapse starting in week 5 with a home loss in double overtime against No. 6 Oregon. This was followed by a 42–37 loss at a winless UCLA team, despite being 25.5-point favorites. The defeat is widely considered one of the worst in program history and one of the largest upsets in college football history. As a result of this loss, the team dropped out of the AP Top 25.

On October 11, Penn State suffered another home loss against Northwestern after quarterback Drew Allar suffered a season-ending leg injury late in the fourth quarter, forcing redshirt freshman backup quarterback Ethan Grunkemeyer to the starting role. Three additional losses followed: at Iowa, 25–24; at then-No. 1 Ohio State, 38–14; and vs. then-No. 2 Indiana, 27–24. These extended the team's losing streak to six games.

By the end of week 7, Penn State's 2025 season had been characterized as a "historic collapse" by multiple sports publications as the Nittany Lions became the first NCAA Division I Football Bowl Subdivision (FBS) program to lose back-to-back matchups as a 20-point favorite. The Nittany Lions eventually rebounded by winning their last 3 games to finish the regular season 6–6, their worst record since also going 6–6 in 2014 outside the 4–5 pandemic year in 2020. They secured a 7–6 record by defeating Clemson in the Pinstripe Bowl 22–10.

The team was led by 12th-year head coach James Franklin for the first six games of the season; Franklin was fired on October 12 following the loss to Northwestern. Associate head coach Terry Smith was named the Nittany Lions' interim head coach.

== Schedule ==
| Date | Time | Opponent | Rank | Site | TV | Result | Attendance |
|---|---|---|---|---|---|---|---|
| August 30 | 3:30 p.m. | Nevada* | No. 2 | Beaver Stadium; University Park, PA | CBS | W 46–11 | 106,915 |
| September 6 | 12:00 p.m. | FIU* | No. 2 | Beaver Stadium; University Park, PA | BTN | W 34–0 | 103,817 |
| September 13 | 3:30 p.m. | No. 11 (FCS) Villanova* | No. 2 | Beaver Stadium; University Park, PA | FS1 | W 52–6 | 109,516 |
| September 27 | 7:30 p.m. | No. 6 Oregon | No. 3 | Beaver Stadium; University Park, PA (College GameDay, White Out) | NBC | L 24–30 ^{2OT} | 111,015 |
| October 4 | 3:30 p.m. | at UCLA | No. 7 | Rose Bowl; Pasadena, CA | CBS | L 37–42 | 39,256 |
| October 11 | 3:30 p.m. | Northwestern^{†} | | Beaver Stadium; University Park, PA | FS1 | L 21–22 | 108,121 |
| October 18 | 7:00 p.m. | at Iowa | | Kinnick Stadium; Iowa City, IA | Peacock | L 24–25 | 69,250 |
| November 1 | 12:00 p.m. | at No. 1 Ohio State | | Ohio Stadium; Columbus, OH (rivalry, Big Noon Kickoff) | FOX | L 14–38 | 105,517 |
| November 8 | 12:00 p.m. | No. 2 Indiana | | Beaver Stadium; University Park, PA | FOX | L 24–27 | 105,231 |
| November 15 | 3:30 p.m. | at Michigan State | | Spartan Stadium; East Lansing, MI (rivalry) | CBS | W 28–10 | 61,671 |
| November 22 | 7:00 p.m. | Nebraska | | Beaver Stadium; University Park, PA | NBC | W 37–10 | 105,038 |
| November 29 | 3:30 p.m. | at Rutgers | | SHI Stadium; Piscataway, NJ | BTN | W 40–36 | 55,212 |
| December 27 | 12:00 p.m. | vs. Clemson* | | Yankee Stadium; Bronx, NY (Pinstripe Bowl) | ABC | W 22–10 | 41,101 |
*Non-conference game; ^{†}Homecoming; Rankings from AP Poll (and CFP Rankings, after November 4) - Released prior to game; All times are in Eastern time; Source:

== Rankings ==
Ranking movements Legend: ██ Increase in ranking ██ Decrease in ranking — = Not ranked RV = Received votes ( ) = First-place votes
| | Week | | | | | | | | | | | | | | | | |
| Poll | Pre | 1 | 2 | 3 | 4 | 5 | 6 | 7 | 8 | 9 | 10 | 11 | 12 | 13 | 14 | 15 | Final |
|---|---|---|---|---|---|---|---|---|---|---|---|---|---|---|---|---|---|
| AP | 2 (23) | 2 (7) | 2 (5) | 2 (5) | 3 (5) | 7 | RV | — | — | — | — | — | — | — | — | — | — |
| Coaches | 3 (14) | 2 (6) | 2 (4) | 2 (3) | 2 (3) | 6 | 22 | — | — | — | — | — | — | RV | RV | RV | — |
| CFP | Not released | | | | | | | | | | — | — | — | — | — | — | Not released |

== Preseason ==
=== Big Ten media poll ===
The annual Cleveland.com Preseason Big Ten Media Poll was released on July 21, 2025. The Nittany Lions were predicted to finish the regular season first in the conference.

== Game summaries ==
=== vs Nevada ===
Nevada Wolf Pack (0–0) at No. 2 Penn State Nittany Lions (0–0) – Game summary

| Quarter | 1 | 2 | 3 | 4 | Total |
|---|---|---|---|---|---|
| Wolf Pack | 0 | 3 | 0 | 8 | 11 |
| No. 2 Nittany Lions | 10 | 17 | 12 | 7 | 46 |

at Beaver Stadium • University Park, PA

- Date: August 30
- Game time: 3:30 p.m. EDT
- Game weather: 70 °F (21 °C) • Sunny
- Game attendance: 106,915
- Referee: Matthew Richards
- TV announcers (CBS): Brad Nessler (play-by-play), Gary Danielson (color commentator), and Jenny Dell (sideline reporter)
- ESPN box score, GoPSUsports.com box score

Game information

First quarter

- PSU – Nicholas Singleton 1-yard run (Ryan Barker kick), 3:05. Nittany Lions 7–0. Drive: 13 plays, 69 yards, 6:41.
- PSU – Ryan Barker 28-yard field goal, 1:41. Nittany Lions 10–0. Drive: 4 plays, -4 yards, 1:16.

Second quarter

- PSU – Kaytron Allen 12-yard run (Ryan Barker kick), 10:02. Nittany Lions 17–0. Drive: 8 plays, 72 yards, 4:18.
- NEV – Joe McFadden 28-yard field goal, 4:52. Nittany Lions 17–3. Drive: 9 plays, 59 yards, 5:05.
- PSU – Ryan Barker 28-yard field goal, 2:22. Nittany Lions 20–3. Drive: 4 plays, 7 yards, 2:18.
- PSU – Kyron Hudson 31-yard pass from Drew Allar (Ryan Barker kick), 0:23. Nittany Lions 27–3. Drive: 8 plays, 64 yards, 1:15.

Third quarter

- PSU – Ryan Barker 32-yard field goal, 9:23. Nittany Lions 30–3. Drive: 9 plays, 60 yards, 5:32.
- PSU – Nicholas Singleton 1-yard run (pass failed), 7:15. Nittany Lions 36–3. Drive: 2 plays, 16 yards, 0:21.
- PSU – Ryan Barker 39-yard field goal, 3:21. Nittany Lions 39–3. Drive: 5 plays, 23 yards, 1:26.

Fourth quarter

- PSU – Ethan Grunkemeyer 6-yard run (Matthew Parker kick), 7:37. Nittany Lions 46–3. Drive: 15 plays, 94 yards, 7:10.
- NEV – Marcus Bellon 9-yard pass from AJ Bianco (AJ Bianco–Jett Carpenter pass), 0:25. Nittany Lions 46–11. Drive: 8 plays, 50 yards, 1:29.

| Statistics | NEV | PSU |
|---|---|---|
| First downs | 13 | 25 |
| Plays–yards | 52–203 | 71–438 |
| Rushes–yards | 31–78 | 36–135 |
| Passing yards | 125 | 303 |
| Passing: comp–att–int | 11–21–1 | 29–35–0 |
| Turnovers | 3 | 0 |
| Time of possession | 26:20 | 33:40 |

| Team | Category | Player | Statistics |
|---|---|---|---|
| Nevada | Passing | Chubba Purdy | 7/15, 97 yards, INT |
| Nevada | Rushing | Chubba Purdy | 14 carries, 55 yards |
| Nevada | Receiving | Marcus Bellon | 6 receptions, 76 yards, TD |
| Penn State | Passing | Drew Allar | 22/26, 217 yards, TD |
| Penn State | Rushing | Kaytron Allen | 8 carries, 43 yards, TD |
| Penn State | Receiving | Kyron Hudson | 6 receptions, 89 yards, TD |

=== vs FIU ===
FIU Panthers (1–0) at No. 2 Penn State Nittany Lions (1–0) – Game summary

| Quarter | 1 | 2 | 3 | 4 | Total |
|---|---|---|---|---|---|
| Panthers | 0 | 0 | 0 | 0 | 0 |
| No. 2 Nittany Lions | 7 | 3 | 10 | 14 | 34 |

at Beaver Stadium • University Park, PA

- Date: September 6
- Game time: 12:00 p.m. EDT
- Game weather: 64 °F (18 °C) • Rainy, cloudy
- Game attendance: 103,817
- Referee: Tim O'Dey
- TV announcers (BTN): Guy Haberman (play-by-play), Yogi Roth (color commentator), and Rhett Lewis (sideline reporter)
- ESPN box score, GoPSUsports.com box score

Game information

First quarter

- PSU – Khalil Dinkins 9-yard pass from Drew Allar (Ryan Barker kick), 3:54. Nittany Lions 7–0. Drive: 10 plays, 87 yards, 3:54.

Second quarter

- PSU – Ryan Barker 41-yard field goal, 0:50. Nittany Lions 10–0. Drive: 8 plays, 13 yards, 3:06.

Third quarter

- PSU – Ryan Barker 34-yard field goal, 9:56. Nittany Lions 13–0. Drive: 12 plays, 60 yards, 5:04.
- PSU – Devonte Ross 42-yard pass from Drew Allar (Ryan Barker kick), 4:44. Nittany Lions 20–0. Drive: 5 plays, 88 yards, 2:09.

Fourth quarter

- PSU – Kaytron Allen 67-yard run (Ryan Barker kick) 3:29. Nittany Lions 27–0. Drive: 1 play, 67 yards, 0:11.
- PSU – Nicholas Singleton 5-yard run (Ryan Barker kick), 1:19. Nittany Lions 34–0. Drive: 1 play, 5 yards, 0:03.

| Statistics | FIU | PSU |
|---|---|---|
| First downs | 14 | 20 |
| Plays–yards | 72–290 | 64–409 |
| Rushes–yards | 39–141 | 31–209 |
| Passing yards | 149 | 200 |
| Passing: comp–att–int | 18–33–1 | 19–33–0 |
| Turnovers | 2 | 0 |
| Time of possession | 34:17 | 25:43 |

| Team | Category | Player | Statistics |
|---|---|---|---|
| FIU | Passing | Keyone Jenkins | 15/28, 127 yards, INT |
| FIU | Rushing | Kejon Owens | 15 carries, 78 yards |
| FIU | Receiving | JoJo Stone | 1 reception, 27 yards |
| Penn State | Passing | Drew Allar | 19/33, 200 yards, 2 TD |
| Penn State | Rushing | Kaytron Allen | 16 carries, 144 yards, TD |
| Penn State | Receiving | Devonte Ross | 3 receptions, 61 yards, TD |

=== vs No. 11 (FCS) Villanova ===
No. 11 (FCS) Villanova Wildcats (1–0) at No. 2 Penn State Nittany Lions (2–0) – Game summary

| Quarter | 1 | 2 | 3 | 4 | Total |
|---|---|---|---|---|---|
| No. 11 (FCS) Wildcats | 0 | 0 | 0 | 6 | 6 |
| No. 2 Nittany Lions | 7 | 14 | 10 | 21 | 52 |

at Beaver Stadium • University Park, PA

- Date: September 13
- Game time: 3:30 p.m. EDT
- Game weather: 82 °F (28 °C) • Partly sunny
- Game attendance: 109,516
- Referee: Chris Coyte
- TV announcers (FS1): Connor Onion (play-by-play) and Mark Helfrich (color commentator)
- ESPN box score, GoPSUsports.com box score

Game information

First quarter

- PSU – Nicholas Singleton 4-yard run (Ryan Barker kick), 8:48. Nittany Lions 7–0. Drive: 12 plays, 78 yards, 6:07.

Second quarter

- PSU – Ryan Barker 45-yard field goal, 14:22. Nittany Lions 10–0. Drive: 4 plays, 4 yards, 0:38.
- PSU – Ryan Barker 28-yard field goal, 6:39. Nittany Lions 13–0. Drive: 10 plays, 53 yards, 4:13.
- PSU – Trebor Peña 23-yard pass from Drew Allar (Drew Allar–Trebor Peña pass), 0:32. Nittany Lions 21–0. Drive: 7 plays, 70 yards, 0:36.

Third quarter

- PSU – Ryan Barker 42-yard field goal, 10:02. Nittany Lions 24–0. Drive: 7 plays, 23 yards, 2:52.
- PSU – Nicholas Singleton 3-yard run (Ryan Barker kick), 3:36. Nittany Lions 31–0. Drive: 9 plays, 59 yards, 4:39.

Fourth quarter

- PSU – Kaytron Allen 18-yard run (Ryan Barker kick), 10:43. Nittany Lions 38–0. Drive: 7 plays, 84 yards, 3:26.
- PSU – Joey Schlaffer 19-yard pass from Ethan Grunkemeyer (Ryan Barker kick), 7:05. Nittany Lions 45–0. Drive: 4 plays, 35 yards, 1:34.
- PSU – Jahmir Joseph 49-yard interception return (Ryan Barker kick), 6:24. Nittany Lions 52–0.
- VILL – Brandon Binkowski 8-yard pass from Tanner Maddocks, 0:00. Nittany Lions 52–6. Drive: 16 plays, 75 yards, 6:24.

| Statistics | VILL | PSU |
|---|---|---|
| First downs | 11 | 28 |
| Plays–yards | 63–179 | 69–465 |
| Rushes–yards | 36–83 | 38–237 |
| Passing yards | 96 | 228 |
| Passing: comp–att–int | 13–27–2 | 17–31–1 |
| Turnovers | 2 | 1 |
| Time of possession | 31:44 | 28:16 |

| Team | Category | Player | Statistics |
|---|---|---|---|
| Villanova | Passing | Tanner Maddocks | 6/12, 69 yards, TD, INT |
| Villanova | Rushing | David Avit | 10 carries, 53 yards |
| Villanova | Receiving | Braden Reed | 2 receptions, 41 yards |
| Penn State | Passing | Drew Allar | 16/29, 209 yards, TD, INT |
| Penn State | Rushing | Kaytron Allen | 10 carries, 86 yards, TD |
| Penn State | Receiving | Luke Reynolds | 4 receptions, 73 yards |

=== vs No. 6 Oregon ===
No. 6 Oregon Ducks (4–0) at No. 3 Penn State Nittany Lions (3–0) – Game summary

| Quarter | 1 | 2 | 3 | 4 | OT | 2OT | Total |
|---|---|---|---|---|---|---|---|
| No. 6 Ducks | 0 | 3 | 7 | 7 | 7 | 6 | 30 |
| No. 3 Nittany Lions | 0 | 3 | 0 | 14 | 7 | 0 | 24 |

at Beaver Stadium • University Park, PA

- Date: September 27
- Game time: 7:30 p.m. EDT
- Game weather: 68 °F (20 °C) • Cloudy
- Game attendance: 111,015
- Referee: Ron Snodgrass
- TV announcers (NBC): Noah Eagle (play-by-play), Todd Blackledge (color commentator), and Kathryn Tappen (sideline reporter)
- ESPN box score, GoPSUsports.com box score

Game information

First quarter

- No scoring plays.

Second quarter

- PSU – Ryan Barker 49-yard field goal, 13:26. Nittany Lions 3–0. Drive: 11 plays, 32 yards, 4:56.
- ORE – Atticus Sappington 42-yard field goal, 3:42. Tied 3–3. Drive: 10 plays, 51 yards, 4:13.

Third quarter

- ORE – Dierre Hill Jr. 8-yard pass from Dante Moore (Atticus Sappington kick), 3:16. Ducks 10–3. Drive: 10 plays, 80 yards, 5:55.

Fourth quarter

- ORE – Jordon Davison 8-yard run (Atticus Sappington kick), 12:25. Ducks 17–3. Drive: 10 plays, 75 yards, 4:57.
- PSU – Devonte Ross 35-yard pass from Drew Allar (Ryan Barker kick), 10:30. Ducks 17–10. Drive: 4 plays, 75 yards, 1:55.
- PSU – Devonte Ross 7-yard pass from Drew Allar (Ryan Barker kick), 0:30. Tied 17–17. Drive: 15 plays, 62 yards, 6:37.

First overtime

- PSU – Kaytron Allen 4-yard run (Ryan Barker kick). Nittany Lions 24–17. Drive: 3 plays, 25 yards.
- ORE – Jamari Johnson 2-yard pass from Dante Moore (Atticus Sappington kick). Tied 24–24. Drive: 7 plays, 25 yards.

Second overtime

- ORE – Gary Bryant Jr. 25-yard pass from Dante Moore (pass conversion failed). Ducks 30–24. Drive: 1 play, 25 yards.

| Statistics | ORE | PSU |
|---|---|---|
| First downs | 20 | 15 |
| Plays–yards | 78–424 | 60–276 |
| Rushes–yards | 39–176 | 35–139 |
| Passing yards | 248 | 137 |
| Passing: comp–att–int | 29–39–0 | 14–25–1 |
| Turnovers | 0 | 1 |
| Time of possession | 33:52 | 26:08 |

| Team | Category | Player | Statistics |
|---|---|---|---|
| Oregon | Passing | Dante Moore | 29/39, 248 yards, 3 TD |
| Oregon | Rushing | Dierre Hill Jr. | 10 carries, 82 yards |
| Oregon | Receiving | Dakorien Moore | 7 receptions, 89 yards |
| Penn State | Passing | Drew Allar | 14/25, 137 yards, 2 TD, INT |
| Penn State | Rushing | Kaytron Allen | 12 carries, 54 yards, TD |
| Penn State | Receiving | Devonte Ross | 4 receptions, 48 yards, 2 TD |

=== at UCLA ===
No. 7 Penn State Nittany Lions (3–1) at UCLA Bruins (0–4) – Game summary

| Quarter | 1 | 2 | 3 | 4 | Total |
|---|---|---|---|---|---|
| No. 7 Nittany Lions | 7 | 0 | 14 | 16 | 37 |
| Bruins | 10 | 17 | 7 | 8 | 42 |

at Rose Bowl • Pasadena, CA

- Date: October 4
- Game time: 3:30 p.m. EDT
- Game weather: Sunny, • Temperature: 72 °F (22 °C) • Wind: South at 3 miles per hour (4.8 km/h)
- Game attendance: 39,256
- Referee: Gregory Blum
- TV announcers (CBS): Brad Nessler (play-by-play), Gary Danielson (color commentator), and Jenny Dell (sideline reporter)
- ESPN box score, GoPSUsports.com box score

Game information

First quarter

- UCLA – Kwazi Gilmer 11-yard pass from Nico Iamaleava (Mateen Bhaghani kick), 10:32. Bruins 7–0. Drive: 11 plays, 75 yards, 4:34.
- UCLA – Mateen Bhaghani 24-yard field goal, 7:22. Bruins 10–0. Drive: 7 plays, 40 yards, 3:05.
- PSU – Kaytron Allen 13-yard run (Ryan Barker kick), 5:14. Bruins 10–7. Drive: 10 plays, 75 yards, 5:14.

Second quarter

- UCLA – Titus Mokiao-Atimalala 6-yard pass from Nico Iamaleava (Mateen Bhaghani kick), 8:52. Bruins 17–7. Drive: 17 plays, 75 yards, 8:16.
- UCLA – Nico Iamaleava 3-yard run (Mateen Bhaghani kick), 4:49. Bruins 24–7. Drive: 6 plays, 68 yards, 3:07.
- UCLA – Mateen Bhaghani 54-yard field goal, 0:00. Bruins 27–7. Drive: 3 plays, 17 yards, 0:22.

Third quarter

- PSU – Khalil Dinkins 40-yard pass from Drew Allar (Ryan Barker kick), 11:32. Bruins 27–14. Drive: 5 plays, 62 yards, 1:44.
- PSU – Liam Clifford 6-yard return of blocked punt (Ryan Barker kick), 7:25. Bruins 27–21.
- UCLA – Nico Iamaleava 1-yard run (Mateen Bhaghani kick), 2:58. Bruins 34–21. Drive: 8 plays, 75 yards, 4:24.

Fourth quarter

- PSU – Kaytron Allen 2-yard run (Ryan Barker kick), 14:27. Bruins 34–28. Drive: 10 plays, 75 yards, 3:29.
- UCLA – Nico Iamaleava 7-yard run (Nico Iamaleava–Kwazi Gilmer pass), 6:46. Bruins 42–28. Drive: 13 plays, 75 yards, 7:45.
- PSU – Kyron Hudson 15-yard pass from Drew Allar (Ryan Barker kick), 4:11. Bruins 42–35. Drive: 10 plays, 75 yards, 2:30.
- PSU – A.J. Harris Safety, 0:17. Bruins 42–37.

| Statistics | PSU | UCLA |
|---|---|---|
| First downs | 21 | 22 |
| Plays–yards | 57–357 | 77–435 |
| Rushes–yards | 31–157 | 53–269 |
| Passing yards | 200 | 166 |
| Passing: comp–att–int | 19–26–0 | 17–24–0 |
| Turnovers | 1 | 0 |
| Time of possession | 20:43 | 39:17 |

| Team | Category | Player | Statistics |
|---|---|---|---|
| Penn State | Passing | Drew Allar | 19/26, 200 yards, 2 TD |
| Penn State | Rushing | Drew Allar | 11 carries, 78 yards |
| Penn State | Receiving | Kyron Hudson | 4 receptions, 52 yards, TD |
| UCLA | Passing | Nico Iamaleava | 17/24, 166 yards, 2 TD |
| UCLA | Rushing | Nico Iamaleava | 16 carries, 128 yards, 3 TD |
| UCLA | Receiving | Kwazi Gilmer | 5 receptions, 79 yards, TD |

=== vs Northwestern ===
Northwestern Wildcats (3–2) at Penn State Nittany Lions (3–2) – Game summary

| Quarter | 1 | 2 | 3 | 4 | Total |
|---|---|---|---|---|---|
| Wildcats | 3 | 10 | 0 | 9 | 22 |
| Nittany Lions | 0 | 14 | 0 | 7 | 21 |

at Beaver Stadium • University Park, PA

- Date: October 11
- Game time: 3:30 p.m. EDT
- Game weather: 63 °F (17 °C) • Mostly cloudy
- Game attendance: 108,121
- Referee: Mark Kluczynski
- TV announcers (FS1): Connor Onion (play-by-play) and Mark Helfrich (color commentator)
- ESPN box score, GoPSUsports.com box score

Game information

First quarter

- NU – Jack Olsen 27-yard field goal, 2:51. Wildcats 3–0. Drive: 12 plays, 58 yards, 7:23.

Second quarter

- PSU – Kaytron Allen 11-yard run (Ryan Barker kick), 11:40. Nittany Lions 7–3. Drive: 12 plays, 87 yards, 6:11.
- NU – Griffin Wilde 29-yard pass from Preston Stone (Jack Olsen kick), 7:14. Wildcats 10–7. Drive: 8 plays, 75 yards, 4:26.
- PSU – Nicholas Singleton 2-yard run (Ryan Barker kick), 1:19. Nittany Lions 14–10. Drive: 9 plays, 26 yards, 4:20.
- NU – Jack Olsen 34-yard field goal, 0:03. Nittany Lions 14–13. Drive: 12 plays, 59 yards, 1:16.

Third quarter

- No scoring plays.

Fourth quarter

- NU – Jack Olsen 41-yard field goal, 14:08. Wildcats 16–14. Drive: 4 plays, -14 yards, 1:22.
- PSU – Drew Allar 1-yard run (Ryan Barker kick), 10:50. Nittany Lions 21–16. Drive: 6 plays, 91 yards, 3:14.
- NU – Caleb Komolafe 9-yard run (run failed), 4:51. Wildcats 22–21. Drive: 12 plays, 75 yards, 5:54.

| Statistics | NU | PSU |
|---|---|---|
| First downs | 23 | 13 |
| Plays–yards | 68–282 | 51–274 |
| Rushes–yards | 42–119 | 31–137 |
| Passing yards | 163 | 137 |
| Passing: comp–att–int | 17–26–0 | 13–20–1 |
| Turnovers | 1 | 2 |
| Time of possession | 34:46 | 25:14 |

| Team | Category | Player | Statistics |
|---|---|---|---|
| Northwestern | Passing | Preston Stone | 17/26, 163 yards, TD |
| Northwestern | Rushing | Caleb Komolafe | 19 carries, 72 yards TD |
| Northwestern | Receiving | Griffin Wilde | 7 receptions, 94 yards, TD |
| Penn State | Passing | Drew Allar | 13/20, 137 yards, INT |
| Penn State | Rushing | Kaytron Allen | 16 carries, 90 yards, TD |
| Penn State | Receiving | Devonte Ross | 7 receptions, 115 yards |

Quarterback Drew Allar suffered a leg injury late in the fourth quarter and was later ruled out for the remainder of the season. The day following the loss to Northwestern, head coach James Franklin was fired.

=== at Iowa ===
Penn State Nittany Lions (3–3) at Iowa Hawkeyes (4–2) – Game summary

| Quarter | 1 | 2 | 3 | 4 | Total |
|---|---|---|---|---|---|
| Nittany Lions | 7 | 7 | 7 | 3 | 24 |
| Hawkeyes | 3 | 7 | 6 | 9 | 25 |

at Kinnick Stadium • Iowa City, IA

- Date: October 18
- Game time: 7:00 p.m. EDT
- Game weather: 70 °F (21 °C) • Cloudy
- Game attendance: 69,250
- Referee: Francisco Villar
- TV announcers (Peacock): Paul Burmeister (play-by-play), Michael Robinson (color commentator), and Caroline Pineda (sideline reporter)
- ESPN box score, GoPSUsports.com box score

Game information

First quarter

- PSU – Kaytron Allen 1-yard run (Ryan Barker kick), 8:45. Nittany Lions 7–0. 10 plays, 35 yards, 5:26.
- IOWA – Drew Stevens 39-yard field goal, 4:24. Nittany Lions 7–3. 9 plays, 54 yards, 4:21.

Second quarter

- IOWA – Mark Gronowski 1-yard run (Drew Stevens kick), 1:14. Hawkeyes 10–7. 2 plays, 1 yard, 0:14.
- PSU – Elliot Washington II 35-yard blocked field goal return (Ryan Barker kick), 0:00. Nittany Lions 14–10. 0:06.

Third quarter

- PSU – Kaytron Allen 8-yard run (Ryan Barker kick), 9:25. Nittany Lions 21–10. 10 plays, 75 yards, 5:35.
- IOWA – Mark Gronowski 4-yard run (pass failed), 4:19. Nittany Lions 21–16. 8 plays, 74 yards, 4:59.

Fourth quarter

- IOWA – Drew Stevens 31-yard field goal, 13:17. Nittany Lions 21–19. 5 plays, 27 yards, 1:55.
- PSU – Ryan Barker 32-yard field goal, 4:56. Nittany Lions 24–19. 16 plays, 61 yards, 8:21.
- IOWA – Kaden Wetjen 8-yard run (pass failed), 3:54. Hawkeyes 25–24. 2 plays, 75 yards, 1:02.

| Statistics | PSU | IOWA |
|---|---|---|
| First downs | 19 | 11 |
| Plays–yards | 74–266 | 49–313 |
| Rushes–yards | 46–173 | 33–245 |
| Passing yards | 93 | 68 |
| Passing: comp–att–int | 15–28–2 | 10–16–1 |
| Turnovers | 2 | 1 |
| Time of possession | 36:12 | 23:48 |

| Team | Category | Player | Statistics |
|---|---|---|---|
| Penn State | Passing | Ethan Grunkemeyer | 15/28, 93 yards, 2 INT |
| Penn State | Rushing | Kaytron Allen | 28 carries, 145 yards, 2 TD |
| Penn State | Receiving | Trebor Peña | 3 receptions, 19 yards |
| Iowa | Passing | Mark Gronowski | 10/16, 68 yards, INT |
| Iowa | Rushing | Mark Gronowski | 9 carries, 130 yards, 2 TD |
| Iowa | Receiving | Kaden Wetjen | 2 receptions, 21 yards |

=== at No. 1 Ohio State (rivalry) ===
Penn State Nittany Lions (3–4) at No. 1 Ohio State Buckeyes (7–0) – Game summary

| Quarter | 1 | 2 | 3 | 4 | Total |
|---|---|---|---|---|---|
| Nittany Lions | 0 | 14 | 0 | 0 | 14 |
| No. 1 Buckeyes | 7 | 10 | 14 | 7 | 38 |

at Ohio Stadium • Columbus, OH

- Date: November 1
- Game time: 12:00 p.m. EDT
- Game weather: 51 °F (11 °C) • Mostly cloudy
- Game attendance: 105,517
- Referee: Gregory Blum
- TV announcers (FOX): Gus Johnson (play-by-play), Joel Klatt (color commentator), and Jenny Taft (sideline reporter)
- ESPN box score, GoPSUsports.com box score

Game information

First quarter

- (6:15) OSU – Jeremiah Smith 14-yard pass from Julian Sayin, Jayden Fielding kick (Drive: 11 plays, 89 yards, 6:10; Ohio State 7–0)

Second quarter

- (14:08) OSU – Jayden Fielding 22-yard field goal (Drive: 11 plays, 71 yards, 5:33; Ohio State 10–0)
- (6:18) PSU – Nicholas Singleton 3-yard run, Ryan Barker kick (Drive: 15 plays, 75 yards, 7:50; Ohio State 10–7)
- (3:41) OSU – Carnell Tate 45-yard pass from Julian Sayin, Jayden Fielding kick (Drive: 6 plays, 75 yards, 2:37; Ohio State 17–7)
- (0:20) PSU – Kaytron Allen 1-yard run, Ryan Barker kick (Drive: 4 plays, 13 yards, 1:28; Ohio State 17–14)

Third quarter

- (12:18) OSU – CJ Donaldson 1-yard run, Jayden Fielding kick (Drive: 5 plays, 75 yards, 2:42; Ohio State 24–14)
- (3:21) OSU – Bennett Christian 1-yard pass from Julian Sayin, Jayden Fielding kick (Drive: 7 plays, 84 yards, 4:31; Ohio State 31–14)

Fourth quarter

- (9:43) OSU – Jeremiah Smith 11-yard pass from Julian Sayin, Jayden Fielding kick (Drive: 2 plays, 62 yards, 0:56; Ohio State 38–14)

| Statistics | PSU | OSU |
|---|---|---|
| First downs | 15 | 22 |
| Plays–yards | 60–200 | 55–480 |
| Rushes–yards | 31–55 | 32–164 |
| Passing yards | 145 | 316 |
| Passing: comp–att–int | 19–29–1 | 20–23–0 |
| Turnovers | 1 | 1 |
| Time of possession | 29:53 | 30:07 |

| Team | Category | Player | Statistics |
|---|---|---|---|
| Penn State | Passing | Ethan Grunkemeyer | 19/28, 145 yards, INT |
| Penn State | Rushing | Kaytron Allen | 21 carries, 76 yards, TD |
| Penn State | Receiving | Nicholas Singleton | 3 receptions, 28 yards |
| Ohio State | Passing | Julian Sayin | 20/23, 316 yards, 4 TD |
| Ohio State | Rushing | Bo Jackson | 13 carries, 105 yards |
| Ohio State | Receiving | Carnell Tate | 5 receptions, 124 yards, TD |

=== vs No. 2 Indiana ===
No. 2 Indiana Hoosiers (9–0) at Penn State Nittany Lions (3–5) – Game summary

| Quarter | 1 | 2 | 3 | 4 | Total |
|---|---|---|---|---|---|
| No. 2 Hoosiers | 7 | 10 | 3 | 7 | 27 |
| Nittany Lions | 0 | 7 | 3 | 14 | 24 |

at Beaver Stadium • University Park, PA

- Date: November 8
- Game time: 12:00 p.m. EST
- Game weather: 55 °F (13 °C) • Mostly cloudy
- Game attendance: 105,231
- Referee: Chris Coyte
- TV announcers (FOX): Gus Johnson (play-by-play), Joel Klatt (color commentator), and Jenny Taft (sideline reporter)
- ESPN box score, GoPSUsports.com box score

Game information

First quarter

- IU – Fernando Mendoza 18-yard run (Nico Radicic kick), 1:42. Hoosiers 7–0. Drive: 3 plays, 68 yards, 1:20.

Second quarter

- PSU – Nicholas Singleton 2-yard run (Ryan Barker kick), 11:08. Tied 7–7. Drive: 10 plays, 67 yards, 5:28.
- IU – Nico Radicic 28-yard field goal, 2:30. Hoosiers 10–7. Drive: 15 plays, 65 yards, 8:38.
- IU – Kaelon Black 1-yard run (Nico Radicic kick), 0:38. Hoosiers 17–7. Drive: 2 plays, 22 yards, 0:31.

Third quarter

- IU – Nico Radicic 31-yard field goal, 8:41. Hoosiers 20–7. Drive: 11 plays, 37 yards, 6:03.
- PSU – Ryan Barker 36-yard field goal, 3:36. Hoosiers 20–10. Drive: 10 plays, 56 yards, 5:05.

Fourth quarter

- PSU – Nicholas Singleton 1-yard run (Ryan Barker kick), 11:36. Hoosiers 20–17. Drive: 5 plays, 85 yards, 3:13.
- PSU – Nicholas Singleton 19-yard pass from Ethan Grunkemeyer (Ryan Barker kick), 6:27. Nittany Lions 24–20. Drive: 7 plays, 44 yards, 4:20.
- IU – Omar Cooper Jr. 13-yard pass from Fernando Mendoza (Nico Radicic kick), 0:36. Hoosiers 27–24. Drive: 10 plays, 80 yards, 1:15.

| Statistics | IU | PSU |
|---|---|---|
| First downs | 20 | 17 |
| Plays–yards | 62–326 | 64–336 |
| Rushes–yards | 31–108 | 33–117 |
| Passing yards | 218 | 219 |
| Passing: comp–att–int | 19–31–1 | 22–31–1 |
| Turnovers | 1 | 2 |
| Time of possession | 30:37 | 29:23 |

| Team | Category | Player | Statistics |
|---|---|---|---|
| Indiana | Passing | Fernando Mendoza | 19/30, 218 yards, TD, INT |
| Indiana | Rushing | Roman Hemby | 12 carries, 55 yards |
| Indiana | Receiving | Charlie Becker | 7 receptions, 118 yards |
| Penn State | Passing | Ethan Grunkemeyer | 22/31, 219 yards, TD, INT |
| Penn State | Rushing | Nicholas Singleton | 10 carries, 71 yards, 2 TD |
| Penn State | Receiving | Trebor Peña | 6 receptions, 99 yards |

=== at Michigan State (Land Grant Trophy) ===
Penn State Nittany Lions (3–6) at Michigan State Spartans (3–6) – Game summary

| Quarter | 1 | 2 | 3 | 4 | Total |
|---|---|---|---|---|---|
| Nittany Lions | 7 | 7 | 0 | 14 | 28 |
| Spartans | 7 | 3 | 0 | 0 | 10 |

at Spartan Stadium • East Lansing, MI

- Date: November 15
- Game time: 3:30 p.m. EST
- Game weather: 64 °F (18 °C) • Mostly cloudy
- Game attendance: 61,671
- Referee: Kole Knueppel
- TV announcers (CBS): Brad Nessler (play-by-play), Gary Danielson (analyst) and Jenny Dell (sideline)
- ESPN box score, GoPSUsports.com box score

Game information

First quarter

- MSU – Elijah Tau-Tolliver 57-yard run (Martin Connington kick), 12:46. Spartans 7–0. Drive: 1 play, 57 yards, 0:10.
- PSU – Kaytron Allen 8-yard run (Ryan Barker kick), 5:50. Tied 7–7. Drive: 12 plays, 75 yards, 6:52.

Second quarter

- MSU – Martin Connington 24-yard field goal, 8:40. Spartans 10–7. Drive: 8 plays, 52 yards, 4:47.
- PSU – Devonte Ross 75-yard pass from Ethan Grunkemeyer (Ryan Barker kick), 8:30. Nittany Lions 14–10. Drive: 1 play, 75 yards, 0:10.

Third quarter

- No scoring plays.

Fourth quarter

- PSU – Devonte Ross 4-yard pass from Ethan Grunkemeyer (Ryan Barker kick), 4:32. Nittany Lions 21–10. Drive: 13 plays, 76 yards, 9:05.
- PSU – Kaytron Allen 26-yard run (Ryan Barker kick), 2:07. Nittany Lions 28–10. Drive: 3 plays, 62 yards, 1:08.

| Statistics | PSU | MSU |
|---|---|---|
| First downs | 19 | 13 |
| Plays–yards | 63–367 | 49–229 |
| Rushes–yards | 50–240 | 22–101 |
| Passing yards | 127 | 128 |
| Passing: comp–att–int | 8–13–0 | 17–27–0 |
| Turnovers | 0 | 1 |
| Time of possession | 37:19 | 22:41 |

| Team | Category | Player | Statistics |
|---|---|---|---|
| Penn State | Passing | Ethan Grunkemeyer | 8/13, 127 yards, 2 TD |
| Penn State | Rushing | Kaytron Allen | 25 carries, 181 yards, 2 TD |
| Penn State | Receiving | Devonte Ross | 2 receptions, 79 yards, 2 TD |
| Michigan State | Passing | Alessio Milivojevic | 17/27, 128 yards |
| Michigan State | Rushing | Elijah Tau-Tolliver | 6 carries, 79 yards, TD |
| Michigan State | Receiving | Elijah Tau-Tolliver | 8 receptions, 73 yards |

=== vs Nebraska ===
Nebraska Cornhuskers (7–3) at Penn State Nittany Lions (4–6) – Game summary

| Quarter | 1 | 2 | 3 | 4 | Total |
|---|---|---|---|---|---|
| Cornhuskers | 0 | 3 | 7 | 0 | 10 |
| Nittany Lions | 7 | 16 | 7 | 7 | 37 |

at Beaver Stadium • University Park, PA

- Date: November 22
- Game time: 7:00 p.m. EST
- Game weather: 40 °F (4 °C) • Mostly clear
- Game attendance: 105,038
- Referee: Ron Snodgrass
- TV announcers (NBC): Noah Eagle (play-by-play), Todd Blackledge (analyst) and Kathryn Tappen (sideline)
- ESPN box score, GoPSUsports.com box score

Game information

First quarter

- (7:22) PSU – Andrew Rappleyea 4-yard pass from Ethan Grunkemeyer, Ryan Barker kick (Drive: 7 plays, 98 yards, 4:07, Penn State 7–0)

Second quarter

- (12:20) PSU - Ryan Barker 26-yard field goal (Drive: 10 plays, 82 yards, 4:53, Penn State 10-0)
- (8:31) NEB - Kyle Cunanan 31-yard field goal (Drive 8 plays, 48 yards, 3:40, Penn State 10-3)
- (4:09) PSU - Nicholas Singleton 4-yard run, Ryan Barker kick (Drive: 7 plays, 75 yards, 4:22, Penn State 17-3)
- (1:14) PSU - Nicholas Singleton 10-yard run, Ryan Barker kick missed (Drive: 3 plays, 14 yards, 1:11, Penn State 23-3)

Third quarter

- (10:07) PSU - Kaytron Allen 3-yard run, Ryan Barker kick (Drive: 8 plays, 75 yards, 4:53, Penn State 30-3)
- (0:55) NEB - TJ Lateef 11-yard run, Kyle Cunanan kick (Drive: 7 plays, 59 yards, 3:08, Penn State 30-10)

Fourth quarter

- (11:10) PSU - Kaytron Allen 13-yard run, Ryan Barker kick (Drive: 8 plays, 75 yards, 4:45, Penn State 37-10)

| Statistics | NEB | PSU |
|---|---|---|
| First downs | 17 | 21 |
| Plays–yards | 69–318 | 51–412 |
| Rushes–yards | 32–131 | 39–231 |
| Passing yards | 187 | 181 |
| Passing: comp–att–int | 21–37–0 | 11–12–0 |
| Turnovers | 0 | 0 |
| Time of possession | 29:38 | 30:22 |

| Team | Category | Player | Statistics |
|---|---|---|---|
| Nebraska | Passing | TJ Lateef | 21/37, 187 yards |
| Nebraska | Rushing | Emmett Johnson | 19 carries, 103 yards |
| Nebraska | Receiving | Jacory Barney Jr. | 5 receptions, 55 yards |
| Penn State | Passing | Ethan Grunkemeyer | 11/12, 181 yards, TD |
| Penn State | Rushing | Kaytron Allen | 25 carries, 160 yards, 2 TD |
| Penn State | Receiving | Nicholas Singleton | 3 receptions, 51 yards |

=== at Rutgers ===
Penn State Nittany Lions (5–6) at Rutgers Scarlet Knights (5–6) – Game summary

| Quarter | 1 | 2 | 3 | 4 | Total |
|---|---|---|---|---|---|
| Nittany Lions | 14 | 10 | 9 | 7 | 40 |
| Scarlet Knights | 14 | 7 | 7 | 8 | 36 |

at SHI Stadium • Piscataway, NJ

- Date: November 29
- Game time: 3:30 p.m. EST
- Game weather: 43 °F (6 °C) • Sunny
- Game attendance: 55,212
- Referee: Bryan Banks
- TV announcers (BTN): Jeff Levering (play-by-play), Jake Butt (analyst) and Brooke Fletcher (sideline)
- ESPN box score, GoPSUsports.com box score

Game information

First quarter

- RUTG – Antwan Raymond 19-yard run (Jai Patel kick), 12:13. Scarlet Knights 7–0. Drive: 5 plays, 75 yards, 2:47.
- PSU – Andrew Rappleyea 53-yard pass from Ethan Grunkemeyer (Ryan Barker kick), 9:46. Tied 7–7. Drive: 4 plays, 62 yards, 2:23.
- PSU – Nicholas Singleton 11-yard run (Ryan Barker kick), 5:11. Nittany Lions 14–7. Drive: 4 plays, 75 yards, 1:54.
- RUTG – Athan Kaliakmanis 2-yard run (Jai Patel kick), 1:30. Tied 14–14. Drive: 7 plays, 75 yards, 3:36.

Second quarter

- PSU – Kaytron Allen 15-yard run (Ryan Barker kick), 14:55. Nittany Lions 21–14. Drive: 4 plays, 89 yards, 1:27.
- RUTG – DT Sheffield 21-yard pass from Athan Kaliakmanis (Jai Patel kick), 0:27. Tied 21–21. Drive: 11 plays, 89 yards, 4:37.
- PSU – Ryan Barker 31-yard field goal, 0:01. Nittany Lions 24–21. Drive: 5 plays, 56 yards, 0:26.

Third quarter

- PSU – Ryan Barker 29-yard field goal, 8:53. Nittany Lions 27–21. Drive: 10 plays, 50 yards, 6:02.
- RUTG – KJ Duff 13-yard pass from Athan Kaliakmanis (Jai Patel kick), 3:51. Scarlet Knights 28–27. Drive: 8 plays, 75 yards, 5:02.
- PSU – Nicholas Singleton 1-yard run (pass failed), 0:54. Nittany Lions 33–28. Drive: 6 plays, 83 yards, 2:53.

Fourth quarter

- RUTG – Antwan Raymond 46-yard pass from Athan Kaliakmanis (Athan Kaliakmanis–KJ Duff pass), 13:33. Scarlet Knights 36–33. Drive: 4 plays, 75 yards, 2:21.
- PSU – Amare Campbell 61-yard fumble return (Ryan Barker kick), 7:27. Nittany Lions 40–36.

| Statistics | PSU | RUTG |
|---|---|---|
| First downs | 23 | 27 |
| Plays–yards | 54–509 | 64–533 |
| Rushes–yards | 33–300 | 42–195 |
| Passing yards | 209 | 338 |
| Passing: comp–att–int | 17–21–0 | 16–22–0 |
| Turnovers | 0 | 1 |
| Time of possession | 27:35 | 32:25 |

| Team | Category | Player | Statistics |
|---|---|---|---|
| Penn State | Passing | Ethan Grunkemeyer | 17/21, 209 yards, TD |
| Penn State | Rushing | Kaytron Allen | 22 carries, 226 yards, TD |
| Penn State | Receiving | Andrew Rappleyea | 4 receptions, 75 yards, TD |
| Rutgers | Passing | Athan Kaliakmanis | 16/22, 338 yards, 3 TD |
| Rutgers | Rushing | Antwan Raymond | 29 carries, 189 yards, TD |
| Rutgers | Receiving | KJ Duff | 5 receptions, 127 yards, TD |

=== vs Clemson (Pinstripe Bowl) ===
2025 Bad Boy Mowers Pinstripe Bowl
Penn State Nittany Lions (6–6) vs. Clemson Tigers (7–5) – Game summary

| Quarter | 1 | 2 | 3 | 4 | Total |
|---|---|---|---|---|---|
| Nittany Lions | 3 | 3 | 0 | 16 | 22 |
| Tigers | 0 | 3 | 0 | 7 | 10 |

at Yankee Stadium • Bronx, NY

- Date: December 27
- Game time: 12:00 p.m. EST
- Game weather: 28 °F (−2 °C) • Snow, cloudy
- Game attendance: 41,101
- Referee: David Alvarez
- TV announcers (ABC): Dave Pasch (play-by-play), Dusty Dvoracek (analyst) and Taylor McGregor (sideline)
- ESPN box score, GoPSUsports.com box score

Game information

First quarter

- (8:32) PSU – Ryan Barker 22-yard field goal (Drive: 10 plays, 27 yards, 5:08; PSU 3–0)

Second quarter

- (0:56) CLEM – Nolan Hauser 48-yard field goal (Drive: 10 plays, 29 yards, 2:46; Tied 3–3)
- (0:00) PSU – Ryan Barker 48-yard field goal (Drive: 10 plays, 48 yards, 0:52; PSU 6–3)

Third quarter

- No scoring plays.

Fourth quarter

- (14:56) PSU – Ryan Barker 43-yard field goal (Drive: 11 plays, 64 yards, 5:09; PSU 9–3)
- (12:51) PSU – Trebor Peña 73-yard pass from Ethan Grunkemeyer, 2-point conversion run failed (Drive: 3 plays, 75 yards, 00:35; PSU 15–3)
- (08:47) CLEM – Adam Randall 2-yard run, Nolan Hauser kick (Drive: 10 plays, 65 yards, 4:04; PSU 15–10)
- (04:56) PSU – Andrew Rappleyea 11-yard pass from Ethan Grunkemeyer, Ryan Barker kick (Drive: 8 plays, 75 yards, 3:51; PSU 22–10)

| Statistics | PSU | CLEM |
|---|---|---|
| First downs | 20 | 16 |
| Plays–yards | 76–397 | 65–236 |
| Rushes–yards | 41–135 | 25–43 |
| Passing yards | 262 | 193 |
| Passing: comp–att–int | 23–35–0 | 22–40–0 |
| Turnovers | 0 | 0 |
| Time of possession | 33:01 | 26:59 |

| Team | Category | Player | Statistics |
|---|---|---|---|
| Penn State | Passing | Ethan Grunkemeyer | 23/34, 262 yards, 2 TD |
| Penn State | Rushing | Quinton Martin Jr. | 20 carries, 101 yards |
| Penn State | Receiving | Trebor Peña | 5 receptions, 100 yards, TD |
| Clemson | Passing | Cade Klubnik | 22/39, 193 yards |
| Clemson | Rushing | Adam Randall | 11 carries, 35 yards, TD |
| Clemson | Receiving | T. J. Moore | 6 receptions, 83 yards |

== Personnel ==
=== Roster ===
2025 Penn State Nittany Lions football team roster
Players
Coaches
Offense

| Pos. | # | Name | Class |
|---|---|---|---|
| WR | 2 | Liam Clifford | Sr |
| WR | 3 | Koby Howard | Fr |
| WR | 4 | Tyseer Denmark | Fr |
| WR | 5 | Devonte Ross | Sr |
| WR | 6 | Matt Outten | Fr |
| WR | 7 | Kaden Saunders | Jr |
| WR | 8 | Trebor Peña | Sr |
| RB | 10 | Nicholas Singleton | Sr |
| WR | 11 | Kyron Hudson | Sr |
| WR | 12 | Anthony Ivey | Jr |
| RB | 13 | Kaytron Allen | Sr |
| QB | 14 | Jaxon Smolik | So |
| QB | 15 | Drew Allar (C) | Sr |
| TE | 16 | Khalil Dinkins | Sr |
| QB | 16 | Bekkem Kritza | Fr |
| QB | 17 | Ethan Grunkemeyer | Fr |
| TE | 18 | Joey Schlaffer | So |
| WR | 19 | Josiah Brown | Fr |
| QB | 19 | Jack Lambert | So |
| RB | 21 | Jabree Coleman | Fr |
| RB | 23 | Tikey Hayes | Fr |
| RB | 24 | Corey Smith | Fr |
| RB | 25 | Quinton Martin Jr. | Fr |
| RB | 26 | Cam Wallace | So |
| RB | 30 | Amiel Davis | Sr |
| WR | 31 | Logan Cunningham | Jr |
| RB | 34 | Tyler Holzworth | Sr |
| TE | 44 | Matt Henderson | Fr |
| OL | 50 | Cooper Cousins | So |
| OL | 51 | Michael Troutman III | Fr |
| OL | 52 | Dominic Rulli | Jr |
| OL | 53 | Nick Dawkins (C) | Sr |
| OL | 54 | TJ Shanahan Jr. | So |
| OL | 55 | Chimdy Onoh | So |
| OL | 57 | Donnie Harbour | Fr |
| OL | 58 | Ian Harvie | Jr |
| OL | 59 | Brady O'Hara | Fr |
| OL | 61 | Liam Horan | Fr |
| OL | 63 | Alex Birchmeier | So |
| OL | 64 | Eagan Boyer | Fr |
| OL | 65 | Jim Fitzgerald | Jr |
| OL | 66 | Drew Shelton | Sr |
| OL | 67 | Henry Boehme | So |
| OL | 68 | Anthony Donkoh | So |
| OL | 70 | Garrett Sexton | Fr |
| OL | 71 | Olaivavega Ioane | Jr |
| OL | 72 | Nolan Rucci | Sr |
| OL | 73 | Caleb Brewer | Fr |
| OL | 74 | J'ven Williams | So |
| OL | 75 | Matt Detisch | Jr |
| OL | 75 | Malachi Goodman | Fr |
| OL | 76 | Mason Carlan | Sr |
| OL | 77 | Owen Aliciene | Fr |
| WR | 80 | Jeff Exinor Jr. | Fr |
| WR | 81 | Donte Nastasi | So |
| WR | 81 | Lyrick Samuel | Fr |
| WR | 82 | Ethan Black | So |
| TE | 83 | Brian Kortovich | Fr |
| WR | 84 | Peter Gonzalez | Fr |
| TE | 85 | Luke Reynolds | So |
| WR | 86 | Aaron Enterline | Fr |
| TE | 87 | Andrew Rappleyea | So |
| TE | 88 | Andrew Olesh | Fr |
| TE | 89 | Finn Furmanek | So |

Defense

| Pos. | # | Name | Class |
|---|---|---|---|
| LB | 0 | Dominic DeLuca (C) | Sr |
| CB | 2 | Audavion Collins | Jr |
| CB | 3 | Antoine Belgrave-Shorter | Fr |
| CB | 4 | A. J. Harris | Jr |
| CB | 5 | Daryus Dixson | Fr |
| S | 6 | Zakee Wheatley | Sr |
| CB | 7 | Zion Tracy | Jr |
| LB | 8 | DaKaari Nelson | So |
| CB | 9 | Elliot Washington II | Jr |
| S | 10 | Dejuan Lane | So |
| LB | 11 | LaVar Arrington II | Fr |
| CB | 12 | Xxavier Thomas | Fr |
| LB | 13 | Tony Rojas | Jr |
| S | 14 | Braz Thomas | Fr |
| CB | 15 | Joshua Johnson | Fr |
| S | 16 | King Mack | Jr |
| CB | 17 | Kenny Woseley Jr. | Fr |
| DE | 18 | Max Granville | Fr |
| DE | 19 | Chaz Coleman | Fr |
| DE | 20 | Mylachi Williams | Fr |
| S | 21 | Vaboue Toure | Fr |
| CB | 23 | Jahmir Joseph | Fr |
| LB | 24 | Amare Campbell | Jr |
| LB | 25 | Alex Tatsch | Fr |
| LB | 26 | Cam Smith | Fr |
| S | 27 | Lamont Payne Jr. | So |
| DT | 28 | Zane Durant (C) | Sr |
| S | 28 | Karson Kiesewetter | So |
| DE | 29 | Daniel Jennings | Fr |
| LB | 30 | Kari Jackson | Fr |
| S | 31 | Kolin Dinkins | Jr |
| LB | 32 | Keon Wylie | Jr |
| DE | 33 | Dani Dennis-Sutton | Sr |
| DT | 34 | Owen Wafle | Fr |
| CB | 35 | Tyler Armstead | Fr |
| DE | 36 | Zuriah Fisher | Sr |
| DT | 39 | Ty Blanding | So |
| S | 39 | Jashaun Green | Jr |
| LB | 40 | Anthony Speca | Fr |
| DE | 42 | Mason Robinson | So |
| DE | 43 | Dayshaun Burnett | Fr |
| DE | 44 | Jaylen Harvey | Fr |
| LB | 45 | Jackson Pryts | Jr |
| DE | 45 | Enai White | Jr |
| DE | 46 | Cortez Harris | Fr |
| DE | 47 | Aidan Probst | Fr |
| DT | 50 | Alonzo Ford Jr. | Sr |
| DT | 52 | Randy Adirika | Fr |
| DT | 54 | Xavier Gilliam | Fr |
| DT | 58 | Kaleb Artis | Jr |
| DT | 88 | Sam Siafa | Jr |
| DT | 90 | Liam Andrews | Fr |
| DE | 93 | Bobby Mears | So |
| DT | 94 | De'Andre Cook | Fr |
| DE | 95 | Jordan Mayer | So |
| DE | 99 | Yvan Kemajou | Fr |

Special teams

| Pos. | # | Name | Class |
|---|---|---|---|
| LS | 35 | Blaise Sokach-Minnick | Jr |
| LS | 48 | Tyler Duzansky (C) | Sr |
| LS | 92 | Andrew Dufault | Fr |
| K | 94 | Ryan Barker | So |
| P | 95 | Riley Thompson | Sr |
| K | 98 | Matthew Parker | Fr |
| P | 99 | Gabriel Nwosu | Sr |

Head coach

- Terry Smith – Interim head coach/defensive recruiting coordinator/cornerbacks

Coordinators/assistant coaches

- Jim Knowles – Defensive coordinator
- Andy Kotelnicki – Offensive coordinator
- Justin Lustig – Special teams coordinator/outside linebackers/nickels
- Deion Barnes – Defensive line
- Dan Connor – Linebackers
- Stan Drayton – Running backs
- Marques Hagans – Offensive recruiting coordinator/wide receivers
- Ty Howle – Co-offensive coordinator/tight ends
- Anthony Poindexter – Co-defensive coordinator/safeties
- Danny O'Brien – Quarterbacks
- Phil Trautwein – Offensive line
- Chuck Losey – Assistant AD/performance enhancement
- Torrence Brown – Defensive graduate assistant
- Kevin Ceh – Offensive graduate assistant
- Jordan Lucas – Defensive graduate assistant

Legend

- (C) Team captain
- (S) Suspended
- (I) Ineligible
- Injured
- Redshirt

Roster
Last update: July 19, 2025

=== Transfers ===
==== Outgoing ====
| Player | Position | Destination |
|---|---|---|
| Mehki Flowers | S | Akron |
| Chase Meyer | K | California |
| Feyisayo Oluleye | WR | Clarion |
| Tyler Johnson | WR | East Carolina |
| T.A. Cunningham | DL | Garden City CC |
| Jon Mitchell | CB | Georgia Tech |
| JB Nelson | IOL | Kansas State |
| Beckham Dee | LB | Lafayette |
| Jerry Cross | TE | Memphis |
| Beau Pribula | QB | Missouri |
| Joseph Mupoyi | EDGE | North Carolina |
| Smith Vilbert | EDGE | North Carolina |
| Harrison Wallace III | WR | Ole Miss |
| Cam Miller | CB | Rutgers |
| Tyrece Mills | S | UConn |
| Ta'Mere Robinson | LB | USC |
| Omari Evans | WR | Washington |
| Jason Estrella | WR | Unknown |

==== Incoming ====
| Player | Position | Former Team |
|---|---|---|
| King Mack | S | Alabama |
| Owen Wafle | EDGE | Michigan |
| Amare Campbell | LB | North Carolina |
| Trebor Peña | WR | Syracuse |
| Enai White | EDGE | Texas A&M |
| TJ Shanahan Jr. | IOL | Texas A&M |
| Devonte Ross | WR | Troy |
| Kyron Hudson | WR | USC |
