= 2025 Pinstripe Bowl =

Postseason college football bowl game

2025 Bad Boy Mowers Pinstripe Bowl
- 15th Pinstripe Bowl
Penn State Nittany Lions	Clemson Tigers
(6–6)	(7–5)
Big Ten	ACC
22	10
Head coach: Terry Smith (interim)	Head coach: Dabo Swinney
	1	2	3	4	Total
Penn State	3	3	0	16	22
Clemson	0	3	0	7	10
- Date: December 27, 2025
- Season: 2025
- Stadium: Yankee Stadium
- Location: Bronx, New York
- MVP: Trebor Peña (WR, Penn State)
- Favorite: Clemson by 2.5
- Referee: David Alvarez (Big 12)
- Attendance: 41,101

United States TV coverage
- Network: ABC; ESPN Radio
- Announcers: Dave Pasch (play-by-play), Dusty Dvoracek (analyst), and Taylor McGregor (sideline) (ABC); Jorge Sedano (play-by-play), Trevor Matich (analyst), and Caroline Hendershot (sideline) (ESPN Radio)

The 2025 Pinstripe Bowl was a college football bowl game played on December 27, 2025, at Yankee Stadium in Bronx, New York. The 15th annual Pinstripe Bowl began at approximately 12:00 p.m. EST and aired on ABC. The Pinstripe Bowl was one of the 2025–26 bowl games concluding the 2025 FBS football season. The game was sponsored by lawn mower manufacturing company Bad Boy Mowers, and was officially known as the Bad Boy Mowers Pinstripe Bowl.

Penn State of the Big Ten Conference beat Clemson of the Atlantic Coast Conference (ACC) by a score of 22–10.

== Teams ==
The bowl was a matchup of preseason favorites. In the preseason AP poll rankings, Penn State had been ranked second, with 23 first place votes, while Clemson had been ranked fourth, with four first place votes. However, both teams ended the season unranked. Scott Dochterman of The Athletic dubbed the matchup "The Disappointment Bowl", while Bill Connelly of ESPN.com quipped, "at least Dabo Swinney is a Yankees fan," in reference to the bowl's venue being the home ballpark of the New York Yankees.

The two teams had met only once before this Pinstripe Bowl matchup, a 35–10 Clemson victory in the 1988 Citrus Bowl.

=== Penn State Nittany Lions ===
Penn State opened their season with three consecutive wins, but then suffered six losses in a row, with three of those losses being to ranked opponents. The Nittany Lions finished with three consecutive wins, and entered the Pinstripe Bowl with a 6–6 record.

Penn State was led in the bowl game by interim head coach Terry Smith; he took over in mid-October, following the dismissal of 12th-year head coach James Franklin.

=== Clemson Tigers ===
Clemson opened their season with three losses in their first four games; with two losses in their next four games, their record stood at 3–5 in early November. The Tigers won each of their final four games to enter the Pinstripe Bowl with a 7–5 record.

== Game summary ==
2025 Bad Boy Mowers Pinstripe Bowl

Quarter	1	2	3	4	Total
Penn State	3	3	0	16	22
Clemson	0	3	0	7	10

at Yankee Stadium • Bronx, New York

- Date: Saturday, December 27, 2025
- Game time: 12:00 p.m. EST
- Game weather: Cloudy • Temperature: 28 °F (−2 °C) • Wind: 8 mph (13 km/h) northeast
- Game attendance: 41,101
- Referee: David Alvarez
- TV announcers (ABC): Dave Pasch (play-by-play), Dusty Dvoracek (analyst), and Taylor McGregor (sideline)
- Box score

=== Statistics ===
Statistics	PSU	CLEM
First downs	20	16
Plays–yards	79–397	67–236
Rushes–yards	41–135	25–43
Passing yards	262	193
Passing: comp–att–int	23–35–0	22–40–0
Time of possession	33:01	26:59

Team	Category	Player	Statistics
Penn State	Passing	Ethan Grunkemeyer	23/34, 262 yards, 2 TD
Penn State	Rushing	Quinton Martin Jr.	20 carries, 101 yards
Penn State	Receiving	Trebor Pena	5 receptions, 100 yards, 1TD
Clemson	Passing	Cade Klubnik	22/39, 193 yards
Clemson	Rushing	Adam Randall	11 carries, 35 yards, 1TD
Clemson	Receiving	T. J. Moore	6 receptions, 83 yards
