= 2025 Villanova Wildcats football team =

American college football season

2025 Villanova Wildcats football

Lambert Cup winner

NCAA Division I Semifinal, L 14–30 vs. Illinois State
- Conference: CAA Football

Ranking
- STATS: No. 4 (tie)
- FCS Coaches: No. 4
- Record: 12–3 (7–1 CAA)
- Head coach: Mark Ferrante (9th season)
- Offensive coordinator: Chris Boden (7th season)
- Offensive scheme: Spread
- Defensive coordinator: Ross Pennypacker (4th season)
- Base defense: Multiple 3–3–5
- Home stadium: Villanova Stadium

2025 Coastal Athletic Association Football Conference standings
	Conf.			Overall
Team	W		L	W		L
No. 11 Rhode Island $^	8	–	0	11	–	3
No. 4т Villanova ^	7	–	1	12	–	3
No. 23 New Hampshire ^	6	–	2	8	–	5
No. 22 Monmouth	6	–	2	9	–	3
William & Mary	6	–	2	7	–	5
Maine	5	–	3	6	–	6
Elon	4	–	4	6	–	6
Stony Brook	4	–	4	6	–	6
Towson	4	–	4	6	–	6
North Carolina A&T	2	–	6	2	–	10
Campbell	2	–	6	2	–	10
Bryant	1	–	7	3	–	9
Albany	1	–	7	2	–	10
Hampton	0	–	8	2	–	10
$ – Conference champion; ^ – FCS playoff participant; Rankings from STATS Poll

The 2025 Villanova Wildcats football team represented Villanova University as a member of the Coastal Athletic Association Football Conference (CAA Football) during the 2025 NCAA Division I FCS football season. The Wildcats were led by ninth-year head coach Mark Ferrante and played their home games at Villanova Stadium located in Villanova, Pennsylvania.

This was the last season for Villanova in CAA Football. The Wildcats will become a football-only member of the Patriot League in 2026.

== Schedule ==
Date	Time	Opponent	Rank	Site	TV	Result	Attendance
September 6	6:00 p.m.	Colgate*	No. 13	Villanova Stadium; Villanova, PA	FloFootball	W 24–17	4,151
September 13	3:30 p.m.	at No. 2 (FBS) Penn State*	No. 11	Beaver Stadium; University Park, PA	FS1	L 6–52	109,516
September 20	1:00 p.m.	at No. 21 Monmouth	No. 11	Kessler Field; West Long Branch, NJ	FloFootball	L 33–51	4,200
September 27	3:30 p.m.	William & Mary	No. 20	Villanova Stadium; Villanova, PA	FloFootball	W 31–24	6,493
October 4	1:00 p.m.	at New Hampshire	No. 18	Wildcat Stadium; Durham, NH	FloFootball	W 37–7	7,302
October 11	2:00 p.m.	at Elon	No. 18	Rhodes Stadium; Elon, NC	FloFootball	W 29–21	7,126
October 18	1:00 p.m.	Hampton	No. 15	Villanova Stadium; Villanova, PA	FloFootball	W 56–14	2,111
October 25	3:30 p.m.	Albany	No. 11	Villanova Stadium; Villanova, PA	FloFootball	W 29–16	4,101
November 8	1:00 p.m.	at Towson	No. 10	Johnny Unitas Stadium; Towson, MD	FloFootball	W 28–10	5,667
November 15	1:00 p.m.	Stony Brook	No. 10	Villanova Stadium; Villanova, PA	FloFootball	W 30–27 ^{OT}	3,111
November 22	1:00 p.m.	Sacred Heart*	No. 9	Villanova Stadium; Villanova, PA	FloFootball	W 34–10	4,101
November 29	12:00 p.m.	No. 15 Harvard*	No. 9	Villanova Stadium; Villanova, PA (NCAA Division I First Round)	ESPN+	W 52–7	2,125
December 6	12:00 p.m.	at No. 4 Lehigh*	No. 9	Goodman Stadium; Lower Saucon, PA (NCAA Division I Second Round)	ESPN+	W 14–7	8,848
December 13	12:00 p.m.	at No. 5 Tarleton State*	No. 9	Memorial Stadium; Stephenville, TX (NCAA Division I Quarterfinal)	ESPN	W 26–21	19,126
December 20	7:30 p.m.	No. 17т Illinois State*	No. 9	Villanova Stadium; Villanova, PA (NCAA Division I Semifinal)	ESPN2	L 14–30	4,133
*Non-conference game; Rankings from STATS Poll released prior to the game; All times are in Eastern time

== Game summaries ==
=== Colgate ===
Colgate Raiders (0–1) at No. 13 Villanova Wildcats (0–0) – Game summary

Quarter	1	2	3	4	Total
Raiders	0	10	7	0	17
No. 13 Wildcats	7	7	10	0	24

at Villanova Stadium • Villanova, PA

- Date: September 6
- Game time: 6:00 PM EDT
- Game weather: Cloudy • Temperature: 75 °F (24 °C) • Wind: NW at 8 miles per hour (13 km/h)
- Game attendance: 4,151
- Referee: Bill McKeever
- TV announcers (FloSports): Sam Kuperman (play-by-play), Steve Pinone (analyst) and Tessa Peloso (sideline)

Game information

First quarter

- VILL – Isaiah Ragland 1-yard run (Jack Barnum kick), 3:33. Wildcats 7–0. Drive: 6 plays, 73 yards, 3:24.

Second quarter

- VILL – Pat McQuiade 28-yard run (Jack Barnum kick), 10:35. Wildcats 14–0. Drive: 4 plays, 37 yards, 1:54.
- COLG – Treyvhon Saunders 32-yard pass from Zach Osborne (Luke Vogeler kick), 7:21. Wildcats 14–7. Drive: 7 plays, 75 yards, 3:14.
- COLG – Luke Vogeler 23-yard field goal, 0:30. Wildcats 14–10. Drive: 11 plays, 71 yards, 5:07.

Third quarter

- VILL – Jack Barnum 39-yard field goal, 5:28. Wildcats 17–10. Drive: 11 plays, 77 yards, 5:48.
- COLG – Winston Moore 24-yard pass from Zach Osborne (Luke Vogeler kick), 2:25. Tied 17–17. Drive: 6 plays, 65 yards, 3:03.
- VILL – Lucas Kopecky 56-yard pass from Pat McQuaide (Jack Barnum kick), 0:52. Wildcats 24–17. Drive: 4 plays, 73 yards, 1:33.

Fourth quarter

- No scoring plays.

Statistics	COLG	VILL
First downs	17	18
Plays–yards	56–350	63–416
Rushes–yards	26–111	35–117
Passing yards	239	299
Passing: Comp–Att–Int	15–30–0	18–28–0
Turnovers	0	0
Time of possession	26:56	33:04

Team	Category	Player	Statistics
Colgate	Passing	Zach Osborne	15/30, 239 yards, 2 TD
Colgate	Rushing	Danny Shaban	8 carries, 50 yards
Colgate	Receiving	Treyvhon Saunders	10 receptions, 137 yards, TD
Villanova	Passing	Pat McQuaide	18/28, 299 yards, TD
Villanova	Rushing	David Avit	15 carries, 49 yards
Villanova	Receiving	Luke Colella	5 receptions, 124 yards

=== at No. 2 (FBS) Penn State) ===
No. 11 Villanova Wildcats (1–0) at No. 2 (FBS) Penn State Nittany Lions (2–0) – Game summary

Quarter	1	2	3	4	Total
No. 11 Wildcats	0	0	0	6	6
No. 2 (FBS) Nittany Lions	7	14	10	21	52

at Beaver Stadium • University Park, PA

- Date: September 13
- Game time: 3:30 p.m. EDT
- Game weather: 82 °F (28 °C) • Partly sunny
- Game attendance: 109,516
- Referee: Chris Coyte
- TV announcers (FS1): Connor Onion (play-by-play) and Mark Helfrich (color commentator)
- ESPN box score

Game information

First quarter

- PSU – Nicholas Singleton 4-yard run (Ryan Barker kick), 8:48. Nittany Lions 7–0. Drive: 12 plays, 78 yards, 6:07.

Second quarter

- PSU – Ryan Barker 45-yard field goal, 14:22. Nittany Lions 10–0. Drive: 4 plays, 4 yards, 0:38.
- PSU – Ryan Barker 28-yard field goal, 6:39. Nittany Lions 13–0. Drive: 10 plays, 53 yards, 4:13.
- PSU – Trebor Peña 23-yard pass from Drew Allar (Drew Allar–Trebor Peña pass), 0:32. Nittany Lions 21–0. Drive: 7 plays, 70 yards, 0:36.

Third quarter

- PSU – Ryan Barker 42-yard field goal, 10:02. Nittany Lions 24–0. Drive: 7 plays, 23 yards, 2:52.
- PSU – Nicholas Singleton 3-yard run (Ryan Barker kick), 3:36. Nittany Lions 31–0. Drive: 9 plays, 59 yards, 4:39.

Fourth quarter

- PSU – Kaytron Allen 18-yard run (Ryan Barker kick), 10:43. Nittany Lions 38–0. Drive: 7 plays, 84 yards, 3:26.
- PSU – Joey Schlaffer 19-yard pass from Ethan Grunkemeyer (Ryan Barker kick), 7:05. Nittany Lions 45–0. Drive: 4 plays, 35 yards, 1:34.
- PSU – Jahmir Joseph 49-yard interception return (Ryan Barker kick), 6:24. Nittany Lions 52–0.
- VILL – Brandon Binkowski 8-yard pass from Tanner Maddocks, 0:00. Nittany Lions 52–6. Drive: 16 plays, 75 yards, 6:24.

Statistics	VILL	PSU
First downs	11	28
Plays–yards	63–179	69–465
Rushes–yards	36–83	38–237
Passing yards	96	228
Passing: comp–att–int	13–27–2	17–31–1
Turnovers	2	1
Time of possession	31:44	28:16

Team	Category	Player	Statistics
Villanova	Passing	Tanner Maddocks	6/12, 69 yards, TD, INT
Villanova	Rushing	David Avit	10 carries, 53 yards
Villanova	Receiving	Braden Reed	2 receptions, 41 yards
Penn State	Passing	Drew Allar	16/29, 209 yards, TD, INT
Penn State	Rushing	Kaytron Allen	10 carries, 86 yards, TD
Penn State	Receiving	Luke Reynolds	4 receptions, 73 yards

=== at No. 21 Monmouth ===
No. 11 Villanova Wildcats (1–1) at No. 21 Monmouth Hawks (2–1) – Game summary

Quarter	1	2	3	4	Total
No. 11 Wildcats	7	7	13	6	33
No. 21 Hawks	17	14	14	6	51

at Kessler Field • West Long Branch, NJ

- Date: September 20
- Game time: 1:00 PM EDT
- Game weather: Sunny • Temperature: 70 °F (21 °C) • Wind: SW at 13 miles per hour (21 km/h)
- Game attendance: 4,200
- Referee: Jeff Pumphrey
- TV announcers (FloFootball): Eddy Occhipinti (play-by-play), Emory Hunt (analyst) and Brandon London (sideline)

Game information

First quarter

- (14:14) MONM – Josh Derry 75-yard pass from Derek Robertson, Hudson Fiene kick (Drive: 2 plays, 75 yards, 0:46; Monmouth 7–0)
- (11:00) VILL – Brandon Binkowski 10-yard pass from Pat McQuaide, Jack Barnum kick (Drive: 6 plays, 67 yards, 3:08; 7-7)
- (8:14) MONM – Hudson Diene 28-yard field goal (Drive: 8 plays, 65 yards, 2:46; Monmouth 10-7)
- (3:00) MONM – Makhi Green 72-yard pass from Derek Robertson, Hudson Fiene kick (Drive: 3 plays, 97 yards, 1:29; Monmouth 17-7)

Second quarter

- (14:28) MONM – Tra Neal 40-yard pass from Derek Robertson, Hudson Fiene kick (Drive: 6 plays, 74 yards, 1:54; Monmouth 24-7)
- (1:57) MONM – Elijah Jennings 2-yard run, Hudson Fiene kick (Drive: 8 plays, 61 yards, 2:52; Monmouth 31–7)
- (0:49) VILL – David Avit 2-yard run, Jack Barnum kick (Drive: 9 plays, 65 yards, 1:00; Monmouth 31-14)

Third quarter

- (13:04) VILL – David Avit 19-yard run, Jack Barnum kick (Drive: 4 plays, 72 yards, 1:50; Monmouth 31-21)
- (10:48) MONM – Rodney Nelson 10-yard run, Hudson Fiene kick (Drive: 7 plays, 59 yards, 2:10; Monmouth 38-21)
- (7:31) MONM – Josh Derry 16-yard pass from Derek Robertson, Hudson Fiene kick (Drive: 5 plays, 46 yards, 2:14; Monmouth 45-21)
- (3:09) VILL – David Avit 2-yard run, Two-point pass conversion failed (Drive: 9 plays, 75 yards, 4:22; Monmouth 45-27)

Fourth quarter

- (10:38) MONM – Rodney Nelson 4-yard run, Hudson Fiene PAT failed (Drive: 13 plays, 75 yards, 7:31; Monmouth 51-27)
- (2:15) VILL – Antonio Johnson 30-yard pass from Pat McQuaide, Two-point pass conversion failed (Drive: 6 plays, 87 yards, 1:39; Monmouth 51-33)

Statistics	VILL	MONM
First downs	27	34
Plays–yards	71–498	75–637
Rushes–yards	28–165	45–240
Passing yards	333	397
Passing: Comp–Att–Int	25-43-0	20-30-0
Turnovers	1	0
Time of possession	27:39	32:21

Team	Category	Player	Statistics
Villanova	Passing	Pat McQuaide	25/43, 333 yards, 2 TD
Villanova	Rushing	David Avit	18 carries, 135 yards, 3 TD
Villanova	Receiving	Luke Colella	9 receptions, 117 yards
Monmouth	Passing	Derek Robertson	20/30, 397 yards, 4 TD
Monmouth	Rushing	Rodney Nelson	33 carries, 186 yards, 2 TD
Monmouth	Receiving	Josh Derry	8 receptions, 177 yards, 2 TD

=== William & Mary ===
William & Mary Tribe (2–2) at No. 20 Villanova Wildcats (1–2) – Game summary

Quarter	1	2	3	4	Total
Tribe	7	10	0	7	24
No. 20 Wildcats	7	7	10	7	31

at Villanova Stadium • Villanova, PA

- Date: September 27
- Game time: 3:30 PM EDT
- Game weather: Sunny • Temperature: 77 °F (25 °C) • Wind: E at 6 miles per hour (9.7 km/h)
- Game attendance: 6,493
- Referee: Alex Parrella
- TV announcers (FloFootball): Ben Curtis (play-by-play), Steve Pinone (analyst) and Tessa Peloso (sideline)

Game information

First quarter

- VILL – David Avit 1-yard run (Jack Barnum kick), 7:22. Wildcats 7–0. Drive: 10 plays, 92 yards, 4:31.
- W&M – Tariq Sims 10-yard pass from Tyler Hughes (Keegan Shackford kick), 3:08. Tied 7–7. Drive: 8 plays, 75 yards, 4:07.

Second quarter

- W&M – Tyler Hughes 1-yard run (Keegan Shackford kick), 11:03. Tribe 14–7. Drive: 13 plays, 72 yards, 5:42.
- VILL – David Avit 15-yard run (Jack Barnum kick), 4:01. Tied 14–14. Drive: 6 plays, 54 yards, 2:49.
- W&M – Keegan Shackford 37-yard field goal, 1:41. Tribe 17–14. Drive: 9 plays, 55 yards, 2:20.

Third quarter

- VILL – Ja'briel Mace 100-yard kickoff return (Jack Barnum kick), 14:48. Wildcats 21–17.
- VILL – Jack Barnum 43-yard field goal, 8:04. Wildcats 24–17. Drive: 11 plays, 43 yards, 5:24.

Fourth quarter

- VILL – David Avit 3-yard run (Jack Barnum kick), 10:18. Wildcats 31–17. Drive: 13 plays, 75 yards, 7:52.
- W&M – Tyler Hughes 1-yard run (Keegan Shackford kick), 4:38. Wildcats 31–24. Drive: 14 plays, 75 yards, 5:40.

Statistics	W&M	VILL
First downs	23	24
Plays–yards	75–356	64–426
Rushes–yards	39–123	36–232
Passing yards	233	194
Passing: Comp–Att–Int	18-36-0	15-28-0
Turnovers	0	0
Time of possession	30:26	29:34

Team	Category	Player	Statistics
William & Mary	Passing	Tyler Hughes	18/35, 233 yards, TD
William & Mary	Rushing	Tyler Hughes	18 carries, 63 yards, 2 TD
William & Mary	Receiving	Isaiah Lemmond	4 receptions, 67 yards
Villanova	Passing	Pat McQuaide	15/28, 194 yards
Villanova	Rushing	David Avit	17 carries, 133 yards, 3 TD
Villanova	Receiving	Luke Colella	6 receptions, 88 yards

=== at New Hampshire ===
No. 18 Villanova Wildcats (2–2) at New Hampshire Wildcats (3–2) – Game summary

Quarter	1	2	3	4	Total
No. 18 Villanova	7	17	0	13	37
New Hampshire	7	0	0	0	7

at Wildcat Stadium • Durham, NH

- Date: October 4
- Game time: 1:00 PM EDT
- Game weather: Sunny
- Game attendance: 7,302
- Referee: Matt Overton
- TV: FloFootball

Game information

First quarter

- VILL – David Avit 34-yard run (Jack Barnum kick), 12:38. Villanova 7–0. Drive: 1 play, 34 yards, 0:07.
- UNH – Matt Vezza 35-yard run (Nick Reed kick), 10:08. Tied 7–7. Drive: 4 plays, 75 yards, 2:30.

Second quarter

- VILL – Ja'briel Mace 31-yard run (Jack Barnum kick), 14:53. Villanova 14–7. Drive: 7 plays, 73 yards, 3:13.
- VILL – Ja'briel Mace 2-yard run (Jack Barnum kick), 9:32. Villanova 21–7. Drive: 7 plays, 60 yards, 2:59.
- VILL – Jack Barnum 27-yard field goal, 0:35. Villanova 24–7. Drive: 11 plays, 79 yards, 1:36.

Third quarter

- No scoring plays.

Fourth quarter

- VILL – Ja'briel Mace 1-yard run (Jack Barnum kick), 12:48. Villanova 31–7. Drive: 14 plays, 80 yards, 7:49.
- VILL – Isaiah Wright 3-yard run (Jack Barnum kick failed), 1:54. Villanova 37–7. Drive: 14 plays, 63 yards, 8:59.

Statistics	VILL	UNH
First downs	28	13
Plays–yards	68–461	48–207
Rushes–yards	42–238	24–89
Passing yards	223	118
Passing: Comp–Att–Int	17-26-0	13-24-1
Turnovers	0	1
Time of possession	33:46	26:14

Team	Category	Player	Statistics
Villanova	Passing	Pat McQuaide	16/25, 219 yards
Villanova	Rushing	David Avit	14 carries, 102 yards, TD
Villanova	Receiving	Luke Colella	9 receptions, 139 yards
New Hampshire	Passing	Matt Vezza	13/23, 118 yards, INT
New Hampshire	Rushing	Matt Vezza	10 carries, 48 yards, TD
New Hampshire	Receiving	Chase Wilson	3 receptions, 50 yards

=== at Elon ===
No. 18 Villanova Wildcats (3–2) at Elon Phoenix (4–2) – Game summary

Quarter	1	2	3	4	Total
No. 18 Wildcats	0	3	14	12	29
Phoenix	7	7	0	7	21

at Rhodes Stadium • Elon, NC

- Date: October 11
- Game time: 2:00 PM EDT
- Game weather: Sunny
- Game attendance: 7,126
- Referee: Bill McKeever
- TV: FloSports

Game information

First quarter

- ELON – TJ Thomas Jr. 8-yard run (Luke Barnes kick), 12:51. Phoenix 7–0. Drive: 4 plays, 74 yards, 2:03.

Second quarter

- VILL – Jack Barnum 38-yard field goal, 12:05. Phoenix 7–3. Drive: 16 plays, 55 yards, 7:42.
- ELON – Landen Clark 4-yard run (Luke Barnes kick), 5:22. Phoenix 14–3. Drive: 13 plays, 75 yards, 6:43.

Third quarter

- VILL – Luke Colella 20-yard pass from Pat McQuaide (Jack Barnum kick), 5:08. Phoenix 14–10. Drive: 11 plays, 55 yards, 6:23.
- VILL – Luke Colella 42-yard pass from Pat McQuaide (Jack Barnum kick), 1:44. Wildcats 17–14. Drive: 4 plays, 50 yards, 1:18.

Fourth quarter

- VILL – Jack Barnum 26-yard field goal, 9:44. Wildcats 20–14. Drive: 10 plays, 71 yards, 4:59.
- ELON – TJ Thomas Jr. 2-yard run (Luke Barnes kick), 5:25. Phoenix 21–20. Drive: 9 plays, 80 yards, 4:14.
- VILL – Ja'briel Mace 97-yard kickoff return (pass failed), 5:10. Wildcats 26–21.
- VILL – Jack Barnum 32-yard field goal, 1:03. Wildcats 29–21. Drive: 8 plays, 59 yards, 2:42.

Statistics	VILL	ELON
First downs	20	18
Plays–yards	70–392	55–344
Rushes–yards	39–137	33–124
Passing yards	255	220
Passing: Comp–Att–Int	23-31-0	14-22-1
Turnovers	0	1
Time of possession	35:21	24:39

Team	Category	Player	Statistics
Villanova	Passing	Pat McQuaide	23/31, 255 yards, 2 TD
Villanova	Rushing	Isaiah Ragland	19 carries, 68 yards
Villanova	Receiving	Luke Colella	10 receptions, 125 yards, 2 TD
Elon	Passing	Landen Clark	14/21, 220 yards, INT
Elon	Rushing	TJ Thomas Jr.	11 carries, 49 yards, 2 TD
Elon	Receiving	Isaiah Fuhrmann	2 receptions, 65 yards

=== Hampton ===
Hampton Pirates (2–5) at No. 15 Villanova Wildcats (4–2) – Game summary

Quarter	1	2	3	4	Total
Pirates	0	0	7	7	14
No. 15 Wildcats	21	28	0	7	56

at Villanova Stadium • Villanova, PA

- Date: October 18
- Game time: 1:00 PM EDT
- Game weather: Sunny • Temperature: 63 °F (17 °C) • Wind: SW at 6 miles per hour (9.7 km/h)
- Game attendance: 2,111
- Referee: Antonio Marcella
- TV: FloSports

Game information

First quarter

- VILL – Pat McQuaide 1-yard run (Jack Barnum kick), 9:06. Wildcats 7–0. Drive: 10 plays, 61 yards, 5:48.
- VILL – Chris Colby 65-yard pass from Pat McQuaide (Jack Barnum kick), 6:39. Wildcats 14–0. Drive: 1 play, 65 yards, 0:10.
- VILL – Lucas Kopecky 13-yard pass from Pat McQuaide (Jack Barnum kick), 1:43. Wildcats 21–0. Drive: 7 plays, 45 yards, 3:12.

Second quarter

- VILL – Luke Colella 34-yard pass from Pat McQuaide (Jack Barnum kick), 13:20. Wildcats 28–0. Drive: 3 plays, 53 yards, 1:29.
- VILL – Obinna Nwobodo 53-yard fumble return (Jack Barnum kick), 10:48. Wildcats 35–0.
- VILL – Antonio Johnson 10-yard pass from Pat McQuaide (Jack Barnum kick), 5:55. Wildcats 42–0. Drive: 5 plays, 40 yards, 2:18.
- VILL – Sean Brodnik 4-yard pass from Pat McQuaide (Jack Barnum kick), 1:50. Wildcats 49–0. Drive: 3 plays, 15 yards, 1:01.

Third quarter

- HAMP – Gracen Goldsmith 3-yard pass from Braden Davis (Brett Starling kick), 6:42. Wildcats 49–7. Drive: 8 plays, 29 yards, 3:40.

Fourth quarter

- VILL – Eli Smith 15-yard run (Luke Myers kick), 6:28. Wildcats 56–7. Drive: 6 plays, 80 yards, 3:24.
- HAMP – Earl Woods III 66-yard run (Brett Starling kick), 4:33. Wildcats 56–14. Drive: 4 plays, 77 yards, 1:47.

Statistics	HAMP	VILL
First downs	16	21
Plays–yards	63–270	51–395
Rushes–yards	40–176	35–220
Passing yards	94	175
Passing: Comp–Att–Int	12-23-1	12-16-0
Turnovers	2	0
Time of possession	33:37	26:23

Team	Category	Player	Statistics
Hampton	Passing	Braden Davis	10/17, 66 yards, TD, INT
Hampton	Rushing	Earl Woods III	7 carries, 102 yards, TD
Hampton	Receiving	Tae'Shaun Johnson	3 receptions, 30 yards
Villanova	Passing	Pat McQuaide	10/13, 166 yards, 5 TD
Villanova	Rushing	Tanner Maddocks	5 carries, 67 yards
Villanova	Receiving	Chris Colby	1 reception, 65 yards, TD

=== Albany ===
Albany Great Danes (1–6) at No. 11 Villanova Wildcats (5–2) – Game summary

Quarter	1	2	3	4	Total
Great Danes	7	0	0	9	16
No. 11 Wildcats	0	12	10	7	29

at Villanova Stadium • Villanova, PA

- Date: October 25
- Game time: 3:30 PM EDT
- Game weather: Sunny • Temperature: 60 °F (16 °C) • Wind: W at 6 miles per hour (9.7 km/h)
- Game attendance: 4,101
- Referee: Justin Ackley
- TV announcers (FloFootball): Nick Mantegna (play-by-play), Steve Pinone (analyst), and Tessa Peloso (sideline)

Game information

First quarter

- (9:23) ALB – Carter Moses 8-yard pass from Jack Shields, James Bozek kick (Drive: 8 plays, 46 yards, 4:40; Albany 7-0)

Second quarter

- (10:00) VILL – David Avit 5-yard run, Jack Barnum PAT blocked (Drive: 10 plays, 43 yards, 5:11; Albany 7-6)
- (7:57) VILL – Jack Barnum 41-yard field goal (Drive: 5 plays, 3 yards, 1:55; Villanova 9-7)
- (1:13) VILL – Jack Barnum 23-yard field goal (Drive: 11 plays, 57 yards, 5:56; Villanova 12-7)

Third quarter

- (8:21) VILL – Luke Colella 34-yard pass from Pat McQuaide, Jack Barnum kick (Drive: 3 plays, 52 yards, 1:24; Villanova 19-7)
- (4:21) VILL – Jack Barnum 44-yard field goal (Drive: 6 plays, 16 yards, 3:39; Villanova 22-7)

Fourth quarter

- (14:54) ALB – James Bozek 36-yard field goal (Drive: 12 plays, 63 yards, 4:20; Villanova 22-10)
- (10:38) VILL – Luke Colella 36-yard pass from Pat McQuaide, Jack Barnum kick (Drive: 1 play, 36 yards, 0:08; Villanova 29-10)
- (5:54) ALB – Aidan Semo 2-yard run, James Bozek PAT failed (Drive: 11 plays, 80 yards, 4:36; Villanova 29-16)

Statistics	ALB	VILL
First downs	13	17
Plays–yards	55–154	61–256
Rushes–yards	28–52	39–53
Passing yards	102	203
Passing: Comp–Att–Int	11-27-1	15-22-1
Turnovers	2	1
Time of possession	26:47	33:13

Team	Category	Player	Statistics
Albany	Passing	Jack Shields	11/26, 102 yards, TD, INT
Albany	Rushing	Griffin Woodell	8 carries, 32 yards
Albany	Receiving	Jordan Rae	2 receptions, 38 yards
Villanova	Passing	Pat McQuaide	15/22, 203 yards, 2 TD, INT
Villanova	Rushing	David Avit	20 carries, 80 yards, TD
Villanova	Receiving	Luke Colella	6 receptions, 107 yards, 2 TD

=== at Towson ===
No. 10 Villanova Wildcats (6–2) at Towson Tigers (4–5) – Game summary

Quarter	1	2	3	4	Total
No. 10 Wildcats	0	7	7	14	28
Tigers	7	0	3	0	10

at Johnny Unitas Stadium • Towson, MD

- Date: November 8
- Game time: 1:00 PM EST
- Game weather: Sunny • Temperature: 64 °F (18 °C)
- Game attendance: 5,667
- Referee: Cory Hanson
- TV: FloSports

Game information

First quarter

- (1:42) TOW – John Dumore 45-yard run, Caden Williams kick (Drive: 2 plays, 73 yards, 0:40; Towson 7-0)

Second quarter

- (1:14) VILL – Ja'briel Mace 8-yard run, Jack Barnum kick (Drive: 7 plays, 80 yards, 3:01; 7-7)

Third quarter

- (13:27) VILL – Ja'briel Mace 39-yard run, Jack Barnum kick (Drive: 4 plays, 52 yards, 1:30; Villanova 14-7)
- (0:53) TOW – Caden Williams 34-yard field goal (Drive: 7 plays, 56 yards, 4:05; Villanova 14-10)

Fourth quarter

- (4:08) VILL – Ja'briel Mace 82-yard run, Jack Barnum kick (Drive: 1 play, 82 yards, 0:12; Villanova 21-10)
- (1:48) VILL – Ja'briel Mace 22-yard run, Jack Barnum kick (Drive: 5 plays, 42 yards, 0:56; Villanova 28-10)

Statistics	VILL	TOW
First downs	24	15
Plays–yards	71–473	59–287
Rushes–yards	48–353	29–131
Passing yards	120	156
Passing: Comp–Att–Int	11-23-0	14-30-0
Turnovers	0	1
Time of possession	35:31	24:29

Team	Category	Player	Statistics
Villanova	Passing	Pat McQuaide	11/23, 120 yards
Villanova	Rushing	Ja'briel Mace	28 carries, 291 yards, 4 TD
Villanova	Receiving	Braden Reed	3 receptions, 41 yards
Towson	Passing	Andrew Indorf	14/30, 156 yards
Towson	Rushing	John Dunmore	1 carry, 45 yards, TD
Towson	Receiving	John Dunmore	4 receptions, 38 yards

=== Stony Brook ===
Stony Brook Seawolves (5–5) at No. 10 Villanova Wildcats (7–2) – Game summary

Quarter	1	2	3	4	OT	Total
Seawolves	7	0	7	10	3	27
No. 10 Wildcats	10	0	0	14	6	30

at Villanova Stadium • Villanova, PA

- Date: November 15
- Game time: 1:00 PM EST
- Game weather: Sunny • Temperature: 52 °F (11 °C) • Wind: SW at 7 miles per hour (11 km/h)
- Game attendance: 3,111
- Referee: Antonio Marcella
- TV: FloSports

Game information

First quarter

- VILL – Braden Reed 37-yard pass from Pat McQuaide (Jack Barnum kick), 11:43. Wildcats 7–0. Drive: 5 plays, 73 yards, 3:09.
- STBK – Jayce Freeman 64-yard pass from Quinn Boyd (Michael Mannino kick), 10:41. Tied 7–7. Drive: 3 plays, 80 yards, 0:55.
- VILL – Jack Barnum 39-yard field goal, 3:57. Wildcats 10–7. Drive: 5 plays, 23 yards, 2:14.

Second quarter

- No scoring plays.

Third quarter

- STBK – Roland Dempster 2-yard run (Michael Mannino kick), 6:55. Seawolves 14–10. Drive: 6 plays, 42 yards, 2:00.

Fourth quarter

- VILL – Luke Colella 10-yard pass from Pat McQuaide (Jack Barnum kick), 14:56. Wildcats 17–14. Drive: 12 plays, 72 yards, 6:53.
- STBK – Roland Dempster 1-yard run (Michael Mannino kick), 9:54. Seawolves 21–17. Drive: 10 plays, 75 yards, 5:02.
- VILL – Luke Colella 21-yard pass from Pat McQuaide (Jack Barnum kick), 2:49. Wildcats 24–21. Drive: 6 plays, 54 yards, 2:51.
- STBK – Michael Mannino 23-yard field goal, 0:42. Tied 24–24. Drive: 12 plays, 70 yards, 2:07.

Overtime

- STBK – Michael Mannino 44-yard field goal. Seawolves 27–24. Drive: 4 plays, -1 yard.
- VILL – Antonio Johnson 17-yard pass from Pat McQuaide. Wildcats 30–27. Drive: 5 plays, 25 yards.

Statistics	STBK	VILL
First downs	14	24
Plays–yards	60–354	74–440
Rushes–yards	27–76	44–160
Passing yards	278	280
Passing: Comp–Att–Int	21-33-0	18-30-0
Turnovers	1	0
Time of possession	20:09	39:51

Team	Category	Player	Statistics
Stony Brook	Passing	Quinn Boyd	21/33, 278 yards, TD
Stony Brook	Rushing	Roland Dempster	18 carries, 65 yards, 2 TD
Stony Brook	Receiving	Jayce Freeman	6 receptions, 175 yards, TD
Villanova	Passing	Pat McQuaide	18/30, 280 yards, 4 TD
Villanova	Rushing	Isaiah Ragland	15 carries, 97 yards
Villanova	Receiving	Braden Reed	3 receptions, 91 yards, TD

=== Sacred Heart ===
Sacred Heart Pioneers (8–3) at No. 9 Villanova Wildcats (8–2) – Game summary

Quarter	1	2	3	4	Total
Pioneers	3	0	0	7	10
No. 9 Wildcats	7	14	6	7	34

at Villanova Stadium • Villanova, PA

- Date: November 22
- Game time: 1:00 PM EST
- Game weather: Sunny • Temperature: 52 °F (11 °C) • Wind: NW at 7 miles per hour (11 km/h)
- Game attendance: 4,101
- Referee: Anthony Florio
- TV: FloFootball

Game information

First quarter

- (13:01) SHU - Matt Kling 37 yd field goal, (4 plays, 8 yards, TOP 01:48; 3-0 Sacred Heart)
- (05:02) VILL - Ja'briel Mace 80 yd run, Jack Barnum kick, (1 plays, 80 yards, TOP 00:13; 7-3 Villanova)

Second quarter

- (13:19) VILL - Ja'briel Mace 19 yd run, Jack Barnum kick, (4 plays, 80 yards, TOP 01:41; 14-3 Villanova)
- (00:27) VILL - Ja'briel Mace 10 yd pass from Pat McQuaide, Jack Barnum kick, (14 plays, 80 yards, TOP 03:41; 21-3 Villanova)

Third quarter

- (08:56) VILL - Jack Barnum 27 yd field goal, (10 plays, 44 yards, TOP 05:06; 24-3 Villanova)
- (02:31) VILL - Jack Barnum 29 yd field goal, (5 plays, 56 yards, TOP 03:10 ; 27-3 Villanova)

Fourth quarter

- (13:15) SHU - Jason Palmieri 6 yd pass from Jack Snyder, Matt Kling kick, (9 plays, 78 yards, TOP 04:10; 27-10 Villanova)
- (07:37) VILL - Isaiah Ragland 11 yd pass from Pat McQuaide, Jack Barnum kick, (9 plays, 71 yards, TOP 05:31; 34-10 Villanova)

Statistics	SHU	VILL
First downs	14	19
Plays–yards	65–374	55–455
Rushes–yards	30–88	25–239
Passing yards	286	216
Passing: Comp–Att–Int	28-35-1	18-30-0
Turnovers	1	1
Time of possession	32:57	27:03

Team	Category	Player	Statistics
Sacred Heart	Passing	Jack Snyder	28/35, 286 yards, TD, INT
Sacred Heart	Rushing	Trey Eberhart III	6 carries, 59 yards
Sacred Heart	Receiving	Payton Rhoades	7 receptions, 113 yards
Villanova	Passing	Pat McQuaide	17/29, 216 yards, 2 TD
Villanova	Rushing	Ja'Briel Mace	9 carries, 165 yards, 2 TD
Villanova	Receiving	Chris Colby	5 receptions, 112 yards

=== No. 15 Harvard (Division I First Round) ===
2025 NCAA Division I FCS Playoffs First Round
No. 15 Harvard Crimson (9–1) at No. 9 (12) Villanova Wildcats (9–2) – Game summary

Quarter	1	2	3	4	Total
No. 15 Crimson	0	0	7	0	7
No. 9 (12) Wildcats	14	17	7	14	52

at Villanova Stadium • Villanova, PA

- Date: November 29
- Game time: 12:00 p.m. EST
- Game weather: Sunny • Temperature: 40 °F (4 °C) • Wind: NW at 8 miles per hour (13 km/h)
- Game attendance: 2,125
- Referee: Jason Berg
- TV: ESPN+

Game information

First quarter

- VILL – Isaiah Ragland 45-yard run (Jack Barnum kick), 11:45. Wildcats 7–0. Drive: 7 plays, 75 yards, 3:15.
- VILL – Lucas Kopecky 30-yard pass from Pat McQuaide (Jack Barnum kick), 8:28. Wildcats 14–0. Drive: 10 plays, 80 yards, 5:02.

Second quarter

- VILL – Jack Barnum 29-yard field goal, 13:23. Wildcats 17–0. Drive: 10 plays, 49 yards, 3:57.
- VILL – Pat McQuaide 10-yard run (Jack Barnum kick), 7:52. Wildcats 24–0. Drive: 8 plays, 65 yards, 4:29.
- VILL – Ja'briel Mace 5-yard run (Jack Barnum kick), 2:00. Wildcats 31–0. Drive: 8 plays, 59 yards, 4:49.

Third quarter

- HARV – Jordan Harris 6-yard pass from Jaden Craig (Kieran Corr kick), 10:24. Wildcats 31–7. Drive: 10 plays, 68 yards, 4:30.
- VILL – Luke Colella 29-yard pass from Pat McQuaide (Jack Barnum kick), 8:17. Wildcats 38–7. Drive: 4 plays, 75 yards, 2:02.

Fourth quarter

- VILL – Antonio Johnson 8-yard pass from Pat McQuaide (Jack Barnum kick), 12:26. Wildcats 45–7. Drive: 5 plays, 39 yards, 2:56.
- VILL – Julian Glantz 5-yard run (Jack Barnum kick), 3:03. Wildcats 52–7. Drive: 6 plays, 31 yards, 3:39.

Statistics	HARV	VILL
First downs	14	26
Plays–yards	49–213	70–512
Rushes–yards	28–106	48–319
Passing yards	107	193
Passing: Comp–Att–Int	9–21–2	14–22–0
Turnovers	3	0
Time of possession	21:46	38:14

Team	Category	Player	Statistics
Harvard	Passing	Jaden Craig	9/21, 107 yards, TD, 2 INT
Harvard	Rushing	DJ Gordon	10 carries, 59 yards
Harvard	Receiving	Cam Henry	4 receptions, 47 yards
Villanova	Passing	Pat McQuaide	14/22, 193 yards, 3 TD
Villanova	Rushing	Isaiah Ragland	17 carries, 152 yards, TD
Villanova	Receiving	Braden Reed	5 receptions, 61 yards

=== at No. 4 Lehigh (Division I Second Round) ===
2025 NCAA Division I FCS Playoffs Second Round
No. 9 (12) Villanova Wildcats (10–2) at No. 4 (5) Lehigh Mountain Hawks (12–0) – Game summary

Quarter	1	2	3	4	Total
No. 9 (12) Wildcats	0	0	7	7	14
No. 4 (5) Mountain Hawks	0	0	7	0	7

at Goodman Stadium • Lower Saucon Township, PA

- Date: December 6
- Game time: 12:00 PM EDT
- Game weather: Sunny
- Game attendance: 8,848
- Referee: Bruce Austin
- TV: ESPN+

Game information

First quarter

- No scoring plays.

Second quarter

- No scoring plays.

Third quarter

- LEH (12:29) - Aaron Crossley 5 yard run, Conner Poole kick (Drive: 5 plays, 75 yards, 2:25 LEH 7-0)
- VILL (2:29) - Ja'briel Mace 1 yard run, Jack Barnum kick (Drive: 6 plays, 59 yards, 3:10 TIED 7-7)

Fourth quarter

- VILL (3:02) -Braden Reed 28 yeard pass from Pat McQuaide, Jack Barnum kick (Drive: 3 plays, 51 yards, 1:24 VILL 14-7)

Statistics	VILL	LEH
First downs	14	21
Plays–yards	55–235	62–339
Rushes–yards	27–27	42–178
Passing yards	208	161
Passing: Comp–Att–Int	18–28–0	12–20–0
Turnovers	0	2
Time of possession	26:42	33:18

Team	Category	Player	Statistics
Villanova	Passing	Pat McQuaide	18/28, 208 yards, TD
Villanova	Rushing	Ja'briel Mace	11 carries, 48 yards, TD
Villanova	Receiving	Luke Colella	8 receptions, 71 yards
Lehigh	Passing	Hayden Johnson	12/20, 161 yards
Lehigh	Rushing	Luke Yoder	11 carries, 80 yards
Lehigh	Receiving	Matt D'Avino	3 receptions, 57 yards

=== at No. 5 Tarleton State (Division I Quarterfinal) ===
2025 NCAA Division I FCS Playoffs Quarterfinal
No. 9 (12) Villanova Wildcats (11–2) at No. 5 (4) Tarleton State Texans (12–1) – Game summary

Quarter	1	2	3	4	Total
No. 9 (12) Wildcats	0	12	7	7	26
No. 5 (4) Texans	14	0	7	0	21

at Memorial Stadium • Stephenville, Texas

- Date: December 13
- Game time: 12:00 p.m. EST
- Game weather: Sunny
- Game attendance: 19,126
- Referee: Kelly Holman
- TV announcers (ESPN): Lowell Galindo (play-by-play) and Aaron Murray (analyst)

Game information

First quarter

- TAR – Peyton Kramer 80-yard pass from Victor Gabalis (Brad Larson kick), 11:32. Texans 7–0. Drive: 1 play, 80 yards, 0:11.
- TAR – Daniel Greek 1-yard run (Brad Larson kick), 7:30. Texans 14–0. Drive: 5 plays, 12 yards, 2:37.

Second quarter

- VILL – Jack Barnum 31-yard field goal, 12:52. Texans 14–3. Drive: 16 plays, 57 yards, 9:34.
- VILL – Lucas Kopecky 27-yard pass from Braden Reed (Jack Barnum kick BLOCKED), 11:20. Texans 14–9. Drive: 3 plays, 45 yards, 1:16.
- VILL – Jack Barnum 42-yard field goal, 1:40. Texans 14–12. Drive: 8 plays, 34 yards, 2:58.

Third quarter

- TAR – Trevon West 15-yard pass from Victor Gabalis (Brad Larson kick), 12:35. Texans 21–12. Drive: 5 plays, 68 yards, 2:00.
- VILL – Ja'briel Mace 47-yard run (Jack Barnum kick), 11:46. Texans 21–19. Drive: 2 plays, 68 yards, 0:45.

Fourth quarter

- VILL – Braden Reed 11-yard pass from Pat McQuaide (Jack Barnum kick), 12:49. Wildcats 26–21. Drive: 12 plays, 78 yards, 7:08.

Statistics	VILL	TAR
First downs	23	17
Plays–yards	72–426	54–266
Rushes–yards	38–219	31–56
Passing yards	207	210
Passing: Comp–Att–Int	17–34–1	12–23–1
Turnovers	1	1
Time of possession	33:33	26:27

Team	Category	Player	Statistics
Villanova	Passing	Pat McQuaide	16/33, 180 yards, TD, INT
Villanova	Rushing	Ja'briel Mace	18 carries, 151 yards, TD
Villanova	Receiving	Luke Colella	5 receptions, 71 yards
Tarleton State	Passing	Victor Gabalis	12/23, 210 yards, 2 TD, INT
Tarleton State	Rushing	Tylan Hines	19 carries, 75 yards
Tarleton State	Receiving	Peyton Kramer	4 receptions, 104 yards, TD

=== No. 17т Illinois State (Division I Semifinal) ===
2025 NCAA Division I FCS Playoffs Semifinal
No. 17т Illinois State Redbirds (11–4) at No. 9 (12) Villanova Wildcats (12–2) – Game summary

Quarter	1	2	3	4	Total
No. 17т Redbirds	7	14	6	3	30
No. 9 (12) Wildcats	0	6	0	8	14

at Villanova Stadium • Villanova, PA

- Date: December 20
- Game time: 6:30 PM
- Game weather: Clear • Temperature: 31 °F (−1 °C) • Wind: S at 14 miles per hour (23 km/h)
- Game attendance: 4,133
- Referee: Zachary Erdmann
- TV announcers (ESPN2): Lowell Galindo (play-by-play), Aaron Murray (analyst), Lauren Sisler (sideline)
- Box score

Game information

First quarter

- ILST – Daniel Sobkowicz 53–yard pass from Tommy Rittenhouse (Michael Cosentino kick), 2:36. Redbirds 7–0. Drive: 8 plays, 80 yards, 3:58.

Second quarter

- VILL – Jack Barnum 23–yard field goal, 14:56. Redbirds 7–3. Drive: 8 plays, 61 yards, 2:36.
- ILST – Victor Dawson 1–yard run (Cosentino kick), 8:43. Redbirds 14-3. Drive: 13 plays, 65 yards, 6:13.
- VILL – Barnum 35–yard field goal, 4:51. Redbirds 14–6. Drive: 9 plays, 47 yards, 3:48.
- ILST – Sobkowicz 8–yard pass from Rittenhouse (Cosentino kick), 3:49. Redbirds 21–6. Drive: 3 plays, 76 yards, 0:57.

Third quarter

- ILST – Cosentino 35–yard field goal, 11:03. Redbirds 24–6. Drive: 8 plays, 57 yards, 3:52.
- ILST – Cosentino 29–yard field goal, 0:02. Redbirds 27–6. Drive: 16 plays, 57 yards, 8:21.

Fourth quarter

- ILST – Cosentino 30–yard field goal, 5:10. Redbirds 30–6. Drive: 13 plays, 53 yards, 7:53.
- VILL – Antonio Johnson 16–yard pass from Pat McQuaide (Braden Reed pass from McQuaide), 3:18. Redbirds 30–14. Drive: 8 plays, 77 yards, 1:48.

Statistics	ILST	VILL
First downs	26	15
Plays–yards	81–426	54–300
Rushes–yards	43–175	24–101
Passing yards	251	100
Passing: Comp–Att–Int	18–38–1	13–30–1
Turnovers	1	1
Time of possession	39:43	20:17

Team	Category	Player	Statistics
Illinois State	Passing	Tommy Rittenhouse	18/38, 251 yards, 2 TD, INT
Illinois State	Rushing	Victor Dawson	34 carries, 155 yards
Illinois State	Receiving	Daniel Sobkowicz	7 receptions, 97 yards, 2 TD
Villanova	Passing	Pat McQuaide	13/30, 199 yards, TD, INT
Villanova	Rushing	Ja'briel Mace	11 carries, 59 yards
Villanova	Receiving	Luke Colella	4 receptions, 58 yards

== Ranking movements ==
Ranking movements Legend: ██ Increase in ranking ██ Decrease in ranking т = Tied with team above or below
	Week														
Poll	Pre	1	2	3	4	5	6	7	8	9	10	11	12	13	Final
STATS FCS	13	13	11	11	20	18	18	15	11	11	10	10	9	9	4т
Coaches	13	12	11	12т	22	19	17	14	12	11	8	7	7	6	4
