= King Mack =

American football player (born 2004)

No. 4 – NC State Wolfpack
- Position: Safety
- Class: Senior

Personal information
- Born: September 21, 2004 (age 22)
- Listed height: 5 ft 10 in (1.78 m)
- Listed weight: 193 lb (88 kg)

Career information
- High school: St. Thomas Aquinas (Fort Lauderdale, Florida)
- College: Penn State (2023, 2025); Alabama (2024); NC State (2026–present)
- Stats at ESPN

Kevin King Mack (born September 21, 2004) is an American football safety for the NC State Wolfpack. He previously played for the Alabama Crimson Tide and for the Penn State Nittany Lions.

== Early life ==
Mack grew up in Miami, Florida, and attended St. Thomas Aquinas High School in Fort Lauderdale, Florida. As a junior, he had 54 tackles and four interceptions, helping the team win a 7A state title. Coming out of high school, he was rated as a four-star recruit by 247Sports, and committed to play college football for the Penn State Nittany Lions over Michigan State.

== College career ==
Ahead of his freshman season in 2023, Mack had a strong showing at camp. He played in all 13 games that season, totaling three tackles, after which he entered the NCAA transfer portal.

Mack transferred to play for the Alabama Crimson Tide in 2024. That season, he recorded 14 tackles in 13 games, after which he entered the NCAA transfer portal.

Mack transferred back to Penn State. In week 2 of the 2025 season, he totaled seven tackles and a pass deflection in a win over FIU. In week 3, Mack racked up four tackles in a victory against Villanova. He finished the 2025 season with 58 tackles, three pass deflections, and an interception. After the conclusion of the season, Mack once again entered the NCAA transfer portal.

Mack transferred to play for the NC State Wolfpack.
