= Terry Smith (American football, born 1969) =

American football player and coach (born 1969)

Current position
- Title: Associate head coach & cornerbacks coach
- Team: Penn State
- Conference: Big Ten
- Record: 4–3

Biographical details
- Born: July 29, 1969 (age 57)

Playing career
- 1987–1991: Penn State
- 1992: Washington Redskins
- 1993: Toronto Argonauts
- 1994–1995: Shreveport Pirates
- 1996: Albany Firebirds
- Position: Wide receiver

Coaching career (HC unless noted)
- 1996: Hempfield HS (PA) (assistant)
- 1997–2000: Duquesne (PGC)
- 2001: Gateway HS (PA) (OC)
- 2002–2012: Gateway HS (PA)
- 2013: Temple (WR)
- 2014–2015: Penn State (CB)
- 2016–2020: Penn State (AHC/CB)
- 2021–2025: Penn State (assoc. HC/CB)
- 2025: Penn State (interim HC)
- 2026–present: Penn State (assoc. HC/CB)

Head coaching record
- Overall: 4–3
- Bowls: 1–0

Accomplishments and honors

Awards
- First-team All-East (1991)

Terry Michael Smith (born July 29, 1969) is an American college football coach and former player who is the associate head coach at Pennsylvania State University. Smith served as an associate head coach and cornerbacks coach at Penn State from 2021 until 2025, when he was named the interim head coach following the firing of James Franklin. He played at Penn State as a wide receiver from 1987 to 1991.

== Early life ==
Originally from Aliquippa, Pennsylvania, Smith and his family moved to Monroeville, Pennsylvania, where he was a star quarterback at Gateway High School. Smith led the Gateway Gators to back-to-back Western Pennsylvania Interscholastic Athletic League (WPIAL) football titles in 1985 and 1986. Considered one of the greatest WPIAL championships ever played, the 1986 game featured an undefeated Gateway team and a North Hills team that was ranked No. 1 by USA Today. Smith scored Gateway's only touchdown as they defeated North Hills 7–6.

== Playing career ==
=== College ===
Nicknamed Superfly, Smith was a four-year letter winner from 1988 to 1991 with the Nittany Lions, ranking among the school's best with 108 career receptions and 15 receiving touchdowns. During the 1991 season, posting a 40-yard dash time of 4.4 seconds, Smith came up big against USC, grabbing 10 receptions to tie a Penn State single-game mark and gaining 165 yards to set a new school record. During his senior season, Smith broke school records with 55 catches for 846 yards and eight scores, helping Penn State to an 11–2 record and a Fiesta Bowl victory over Tennessee. After breaking the single-season receptions record in a game against Rutgers, Joe Paterno said about Smith, "I don't know whether there's a better wideout in the country as far as what he does. He catches the ball, he blocks, he runs with the ball, he's in the football game -- he's just a great player."

=== Professional ===
==== National Football League ====
Smith was drafted by the Washington Redskins in the 11th round of the 1992 NFL draft.

==== Canadian Football League ====
Smith spent the following three seasons with the Toronto Argonauts and the Shreveport Pirates of the Canadian Football League.

==== Arena League ====
Smith also spent one season with the Albany Firebirds of the Arena league in 1996.

== Coaching career ==
=== Early coaching career ===
In 1996, Smith began his coaching career as an assistant at Hempfield Area High School. From there, Smith spent the next four seasons as the passing coordinator for the Duquesne Dukes. In 2001, Smith returned to his high school alma mater, the Gateway Gators, where he served as the offensive coordinator.

The following season Smith was named as the Gators' head coach, and over the next eleven seasons Smith led Gateway to a 101–30 mark and four WPIAL runner-up finishes. In that time Smith sent 23 players to NCAA FBS (I-A) colleges and 17 more to FCS(I-AA) colleges. Smith, who also served as the athletic director, departed Gateway following the 2012 football season when his athletic director position was reduced to part-time. His salary was also cut in half and the district instituted a new rule that no administrator could coach. Following a January recruiting visit in 2013, Temple Owls coach and fellow Penn State alum Matt Rhule offered Smith a coaching position as his wide receivers coach. He also was the head coach for the MAAC Track Club, a part of the USATF.

=== Penn State ===
In 2014, James Franklin hired Smith as the Penn State Nittany Lions’ defensive recruiting coordinator and cornerbacks coach, positions he currently maintains. During his first season with the Nittany Lions, the defense finished second in total defense, eighth in scoring, second in pass efficiency and sixth in 3rd down conversion percentage nationally. Smith added the title of assistant head coach following the season.

Led by sophomore John Reid, who earned All-Big Ten honorable mention accolades, and Grant Haley, the cornerbacks made several key plays to help the Nittany Lions to the 2016 Big Ten Football Championship Game.

In 2017 Smith's starting cornerbacks, Christian Campbell and Grant Haley, earned All-Big Ten honorable mention accolades, while backup cornerback Amani Oruwariye earned second team honors. That season the Nittany Lions' defense helped Penn State to its second-straight New Year's Six bowl and a Top 10 finish. The 16.5 points allowed per game was also the fewest since the 2008 team gave up 12.2 per contest. Campbell was drafted by the Arizona Cardinals in the sixth round (182nd overall) of the 2018 NFL draft.

In 2018, cornerbacks Amani Oruwariye earned first team All-Big Ten honors, while John Reid received honorable mention. Penn State secondary had one of its best seasons since 2014, finishing the season with 13 interceptions and allowing a 53.6 completion rate. The Nittany Lions also held three opponents to 60 or less yards through the air, this was the first time PSU had accomplished this feat since the 1976 season.

In 2019, cornerback Tariq Castro-Fields earned third team All-Big Ten honors. During the 2020 season, Smith was made the lead recruiter for the Philadelphia area. In 2021, Penn State signed its first players from the Philadelphia Public League to a recruiting class since 2016 and the first Philadelphia Catholic League player since 2017.

Following the firing of James Franklin on October 12, 2025, Smith was named Penn State's interim coach for the remainder of the season, until Matt Campbell was named as the new head coach on December 5, 2025. Smith will stay with the Penn State program as an assistant under Campbell.

== Personal life ==
Smith received a bachelor's degree in business management from Penn State. He and his wife, Alison, have a son, former Penn State standout Justin King, and daughter Haley. Smith is a class of 2018 WPIAL Hall of Fame inductee.

== Head coaching record ==
=== College ===
| Year | Team | Overall | Conference | Standing | Bowl/playoffs | Coaches^{#} | AP^{°} |
|---|---|---|---|---|---|---|---|
Penn State Nittany Lions (Big Ten Conference) (2025)
| 2025 | Penn State | 4–3 | 3–3 | T–12th | W Pinstripe | | |
| Penn State: | | 4–3 | 3–3 | | | | |
| Total: | | 4–3 | | | | | |
^{#}Rankings from final Coaches Poll.; ^{°}Rankings from final AP Poll.
