= Daryus Dixson =

American football player (born 2006)

No. 5 – Penn State Nittany Lions
- Position: Cornerback
- Class: Sophomore

Personal information
- Born: May 5, 2006 (age 20)
- Listed height: 6 ft 0 in (1.83 m)
- Listed weight: 184 lb (83 kg)

Career information
- High school: Mater Dei (Santa Ana, California)
- College: Penn State (2025–present)
- Stats at ESPN

Daryus Kevin Dixson (born May 5, 2006) is an American college football cornerback for the Penn State Nittany Lions.

== Early life ==
Dixson attended Mater Dei High School in Santa Ana, California. During his high school career he had eight interceptions. He committed to Penn State to play college football.

== College career ==
Dixson earned early playing time his true freshman year at Penn State in 2025. He finished the year with 24 tackles and one sack over 13 games with two starts. Dixson entered his sophomore season in 2026 as a starter. He recorded his first career interception in the fourth game of the season against the Wisconsin Badgers.
