= Devonte Ross =

American football player (born 2002)

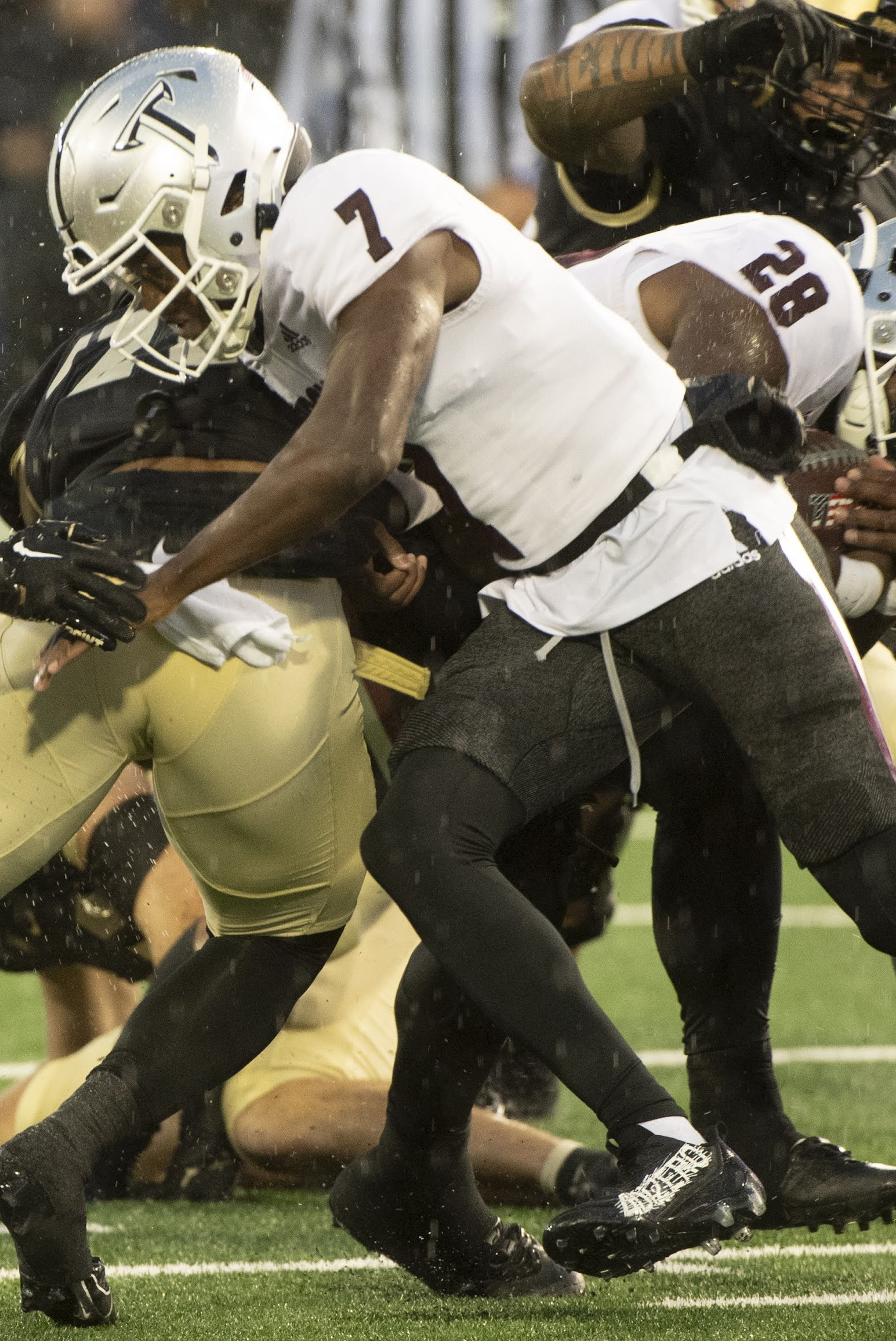
- Ross with Troy in 2023

Profile
- Position: Wide receiver

Personal information
- Born: September 9, 2002 (age 24); Cartersville, Georgia
- Listed height: 5 ft 10 in (1.78 m)
- Listed weight: 170 lb (77 kg)

Career information
- High school: Cartersville (Cartersville, Georgia)
- College: Troy (2022–2024); Penn State (2025)
- NFL draft: 2026: undrafted

Career history
- Los Angeles Chargers (2026)*
- * Offseason or practice squad member only

Awards and highlights
- First-team All-Sun Belt (2024)
- Stats at Pro Football Reference

Devonte Ross (born September 9, 2002) is an American professional wide receiver. He played college football for the Troy Trojans and the Penn State Nittany Lions.

== Early life ==
Ross attended Cartersville High School in Cartersville, Georgia. He played wide receiver and cornerback in high school. As a senior, he was the Daily Tribune Player of the Year after recording 43 receptions for 876 yards and 10 touchdowns on offense and 26 tackles and one interception on defense. For his career he had 126 receptions for 2,532 yards and 29 touchdowns. Ross originally committed to play college football at the University of Kentucky before flipping his commitment to Troy University.

== College career ==
Ross played at Troy from 2022 to 2024. In his first two years he combined for 53 receptions for 575 yards and three touchdowns. As a junior in 2024, he set the school record for receiving yards in a game with 229. He finished the season with 76 receptions for 1,043 yards and 11 touchdowns. After the season, Ross entered the transfer portal and transferred to Penn State University.

=== Career statistics ===
Legend
**Bold**	Career high

Season	GP	Receiving				Rushing				
Season	GP	Rec	Yds	Avg	TD	Att	Yds	Avg	TD	
2022	Troy	13	13	147	11.3	0	0	0	0.0	0
2023	Troy	**14**	40	428	10.7	3	1	2	2.0	0
2024	Troy	12	**76**	**1,043**	**13.7**	**11**	**9**	**35**	**3.9**	0
Career		39	129	1,618	12.5	14	10	37	3.7	0

== Professional career ==
Pre-draft measurables
Height	Weight	Arm length	Hand span	Wingspan	40-yard dash	10-yard split	20-yard split	20-yard shuttle	Three-cone drill	Vertical jump	Broad jump
5 ft 9 1/8 in (1.76 m)	162 lb (73 kg)	30 3/8 in (0.77 m)	9 in (0.23 m)	5 ft 11 5/8 in (1.82 m)	4.45 s	1.62 s	2.58 s	4.36 s	7.21 s	36.0 in (0.91 m)	10 ft 8 in (3.25 m)
All values from Pro Day

After going undrafted in the 2026 NFL draft, Ross signed with the Los Angeles Chargers as an undrafted free agent. Ross was waived by the Chargers as a part of final roster cuts on August 30, 2026; he was re-signed to the team's practice squad the following day. Ross was released by Los Angeles on September 2.
