= Ethan Grunkemeyer =

American football player (born 2005)

No. 17 – Virginia Tech Hokies
- Position: Quarterback
- Class: Redshirt Sophomore

Personal information
- Born: July 10, 2005 (age 21)
- Listed height: 6 ft 2 in (1.88 m)
- Listed weight: 218 lb (99 kg)

Career information
- High school: Olentangy (Lewis Center, Ohio)
- College: Penn State (2024–2025); Virginia Tech (2026–present)
- Stats at ESPN

Ethan McCabe Grunkemeyer (born July 10, 2005) is an American college football quarterback for the Virginia Tech Hokies. He previously played for the Penn State Nittany Lions.

== Early life ==
Grunkemeyer grew up in Lewis Center, Ohio, and started playing several sports from a young age, including flag football starting at three. He attended Olentangy High School where he played football and basketball, being a quarterback in football. He was backup quarterback as a freshman and then became starter as a sophomore in 2021, throwing for 2,152 yards, 16 touchdowns and 10 interceptions. He then threw for 2,649 yards and 25 touchdowns as a junior.

In his senior year, Grunkemeyer helped Olentangy compile a record of 11–2 while throwing for 3,517 yards and 39 touchdowns, being chosen first-team all-state. He was also named first-team all-conference, first-team all-district, the conference co-offensive player of the year and the county offensive player of the year. Grunkemeyer was invited to the Elite 11 finals and the Under Armour All-America Game. He finished as the Olentangy career record-holder for both passing yards and passing touchdowns, while he also set single-season records at Olentangy in those categories.

Grunkemeyer was initially lightly recruited, having no offers as he started his junior year and only one (Miami of Ohio) by the end of it. However, interest surged over the summer of his senior year and he began receiving offers from many major programs. He rose from being a three-star recruit to a four-star recruit and finished his tenure at Olentangy being ranked the 85th-best player nationally and the fifth-best quarterback by ESPN. He committed to play college football for the Penn State Nittany Lions.

== College career ==
Grunkemeyer entered his true freshman season at Penn State as the third-string quarterback, behind Drew Allar and Beau Pribula, and redshirted. In December, after Pribula entered the transfer portal, Grunkemeyer was promoted to being Allar's backup. He made his debut in the team's first round playoff game against the SMU Mustangs, completing one of two pass attempts for nine yards with an interception. He entered the 2025 season as backup to Allar. After Allar was injured during the season, Grunkemeyer became the new starter in his place. In his first start, he threw for 93 yards and two interceptions in a 25–24 loss to the Iowa Hawkeyes.

Grunkemeyer led his teams to wins in eight-straight games, four victories for the Hokies at the start of the 2026 season, and the last four as the Nittany Lion starter in 2025. After five games in 2026, Grunkemeyer is ranked third nationally in completions per game (26.2) and sixth for completion percentage at .740.

=== Statistics ===
Season	Team	Games			Passing								Rushing			
Season	Team	GP	GS	Record	Cmp	Att	Pct	Yds	Y/A	TD	Int	Rtg	Att	Yds	Avg	TD
2024	Penn State	1	0	—	1	2	50.0	9	4.5	0	1	-12.2	0	0	0.0	0
2025	Penn State	11	7	4–3	123	178	69.1	1,339	7.5	8	4	142.6	35	-46	-1.3	1
2026	Virginia Tech	10	10	6–4	232	334	69.5	2,701	8.1	20	5	154.3	82	1	0.0	6
Career		22	17	10–7	356	514	69.3	4,049	7.9	28	10	149.5	117	-45	-0.4	7
