= Drew Allar =

American football player (born 2004)

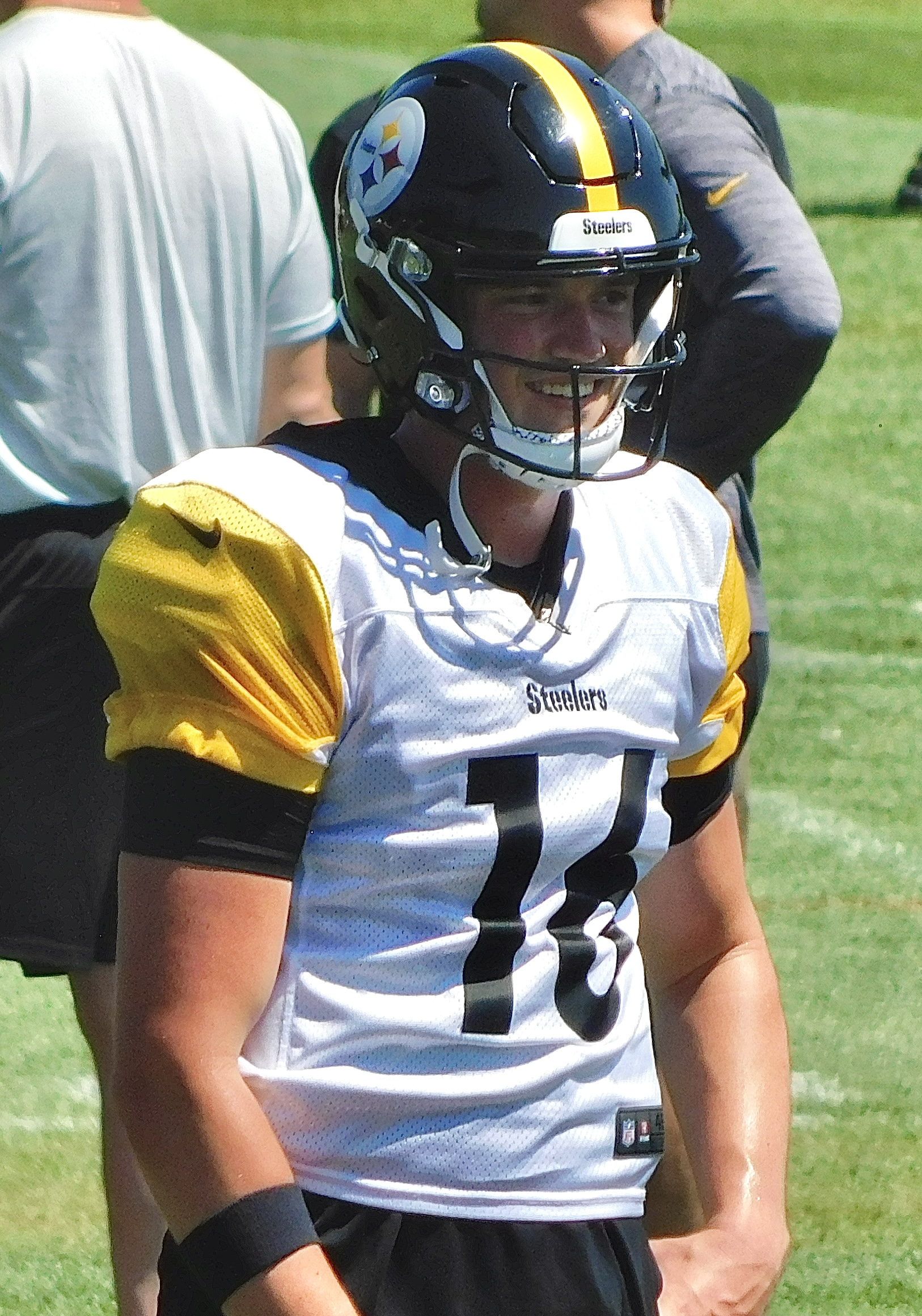
- Allar with the Pittsburgh Steelers in 2026

No. 16 – Pittsburgh Steelers
- Position: Quarterback
- Roster status: Active

Personal information
- Born: March 8, 2004 (age 22); Brunswick, Ohio, U.S.
- Listed height: 6 ft 5 in (1.96 m)
- Listed weight: 228 lb (103 kg)

Career information
- High school: Medina (Medina, Ohio)
- College: Penn State (2022–2025)
- NFL draft: 2026: 3rd round, 76th overall pick

Career history
- Pittsburgh Steelers (2026–present)
- Stats at Pro Football Reference

Drew Patrick Allar (born March 8, 2004) is an American professional football quarterback for the Pittsburgh Steelers of the National Football League (NFL). He played college football for the Penn State Nittany Lions and was selected by the Steelers in the third round of the 2026 NFL draft.

== Early life ==
Allar was born in Brunswick, Ohio, and grew up in Medina, Ohio, where he attended Medina High School. He became Medina's starting quarterback as a sophomore and passed for 1,802 yards and 23 touchdowns. Allar passed for 2,962 yards with 26 touchdowns during his junior season.

As a senior, he completed 305 of 509 pass attempts (59.9%) for 4,444 yards and 48 touchdowns with seven interceptions and also rushed for 406 yards and nine touchdowns. Following the end of the season, Allar was named Ohio Mr. Football.

Over the course of his high school career, Allar completed 630 of 1,149 pass attempts for 9,103 yards and 98 touchdowns with 20 interceptions.

Allar was initially rated a three-star recruit and committed to Penn State. After committing, he was later re-rated to a four-star recruit by most recruiting services and later as a five-star prospect by 247Sports.

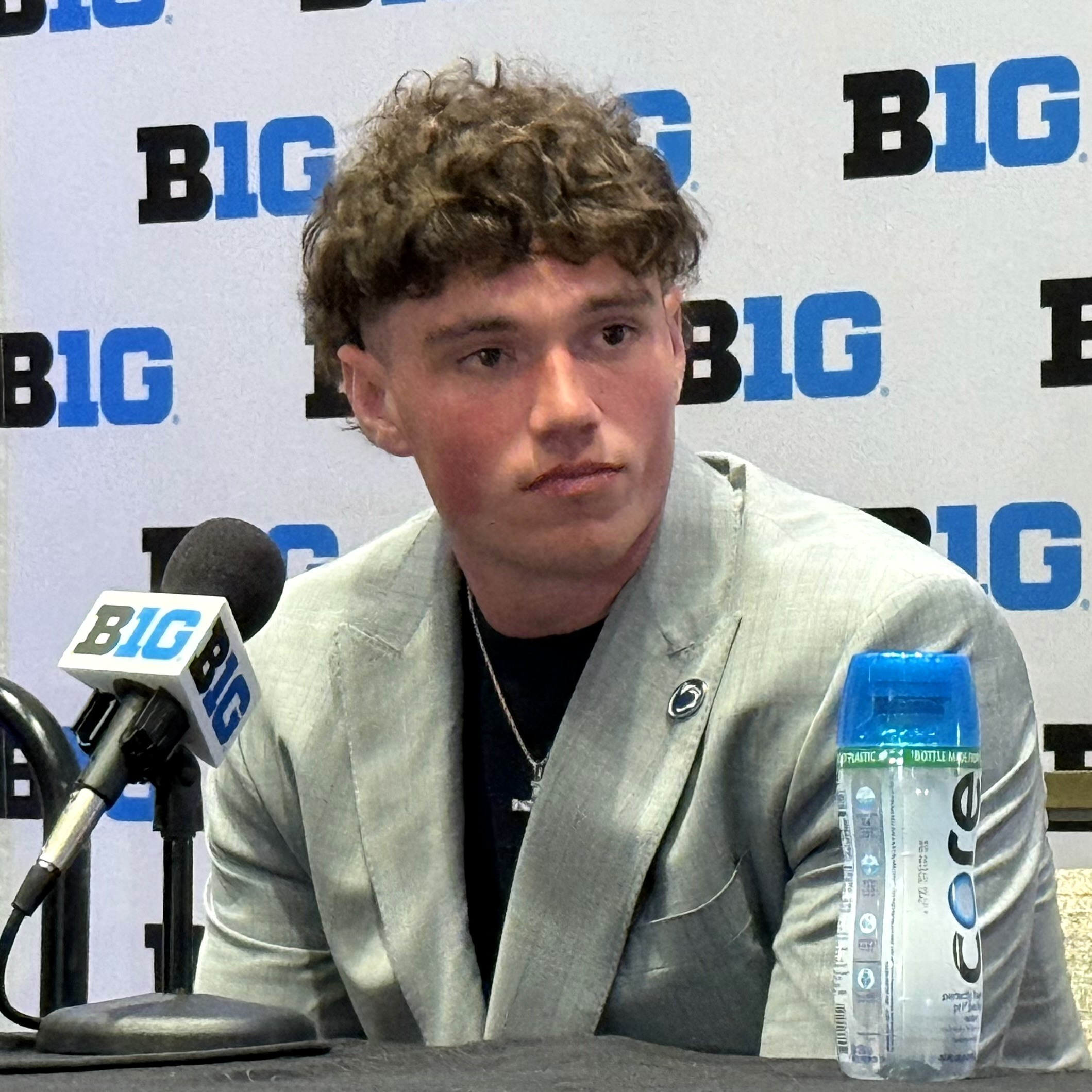
Allar with Penn State in 2025

== College career ==
Allar joined the Penn State Nittany Lions as an early enrollee in January 2022. He was named the Nittany Lions' backup quarterback entering the 2022 season opener. Allar made his college debut in the season opener against Purdue, completing two passes on four attempts for 26 yards when starter Sean Clifford left the game due to an apparent knee injury.

He played in nine games, all coming off of the bench, during his freshman season and completed 35 of 60 pass attempts for 344 yards and four touchdowns while also rushing for 52 yards and one touchdown.

On October 11, 2025, Allar suffered a season-ending ankle injury in a loss against Northwestern. Due to NCAA regulations, he could not medically redshirt the season, making it a college career-ending injury as well.

=== Statistics ===
Season	Team	Games			Passing								Rushing			
Season	Team	GP	GS	Record	Cmp	Att	Pct	Yds	Y/A	TD	Int	Rtg	Att	Yds	Avg	TD
2022	Penn State	10	0	—	35	60	58.3	344	5.7	4	0	128.5	18	52	2.9	1
2023	Penn State	13	13	10−3	233	389	59.9	2,631	6.8	25	2	136.9	74	206	2.8	4
2024	Penn State	16	16	13−3	262	394	66.5	3,327	8.4	24	8	153.5	96	302	3.1	6
2025	Penn State	6	6	3−3	103	159	64.8	1,100	6.9	8	3	135.7	36	172	4.8	1
Career		45	35	26−9	633	1,002	63.2	7,402	7.4	61	13	142.7	224	732	3.3	12

== Professional career ==
Pre-draft measurables
Height	Weight	Arm length	Hand span	Wingspan
6 ft 5 1/4 in (1.96 m)	228 lb (103 kg)	32 3/4 in (0.83 m)	9 7/8 in (0.25 m)	6 ft 7 5/8 in (2.02 m)
All values from NFL Combine

Allar (16) during a 2026 preseason game against the New York Jets in 2026

Allar was selected in the third round (76th overall pick) of the 2026 NFL draft by the Pittsburgh Steelers. The Steelers used one of the selections they acquired from the Dallas Cowboys as part of the deal for George Pickens.

Allar made his professional debut on August 13, 2026 during the first preseason game against the Green Bay Packers, where he completed 10 out of 13 passes for 153 yards and 3 touchdowns , 2 passing and 1 rushing.

The 2026 season began with Allar being one of four quarterbacks on the Steelers' final 52 man roster. He was named third string quarterback alongside Will Howard behind Mason Rudolph and Aaron Rodgers.
