= Trebor Peña =

American football player (born 2002)

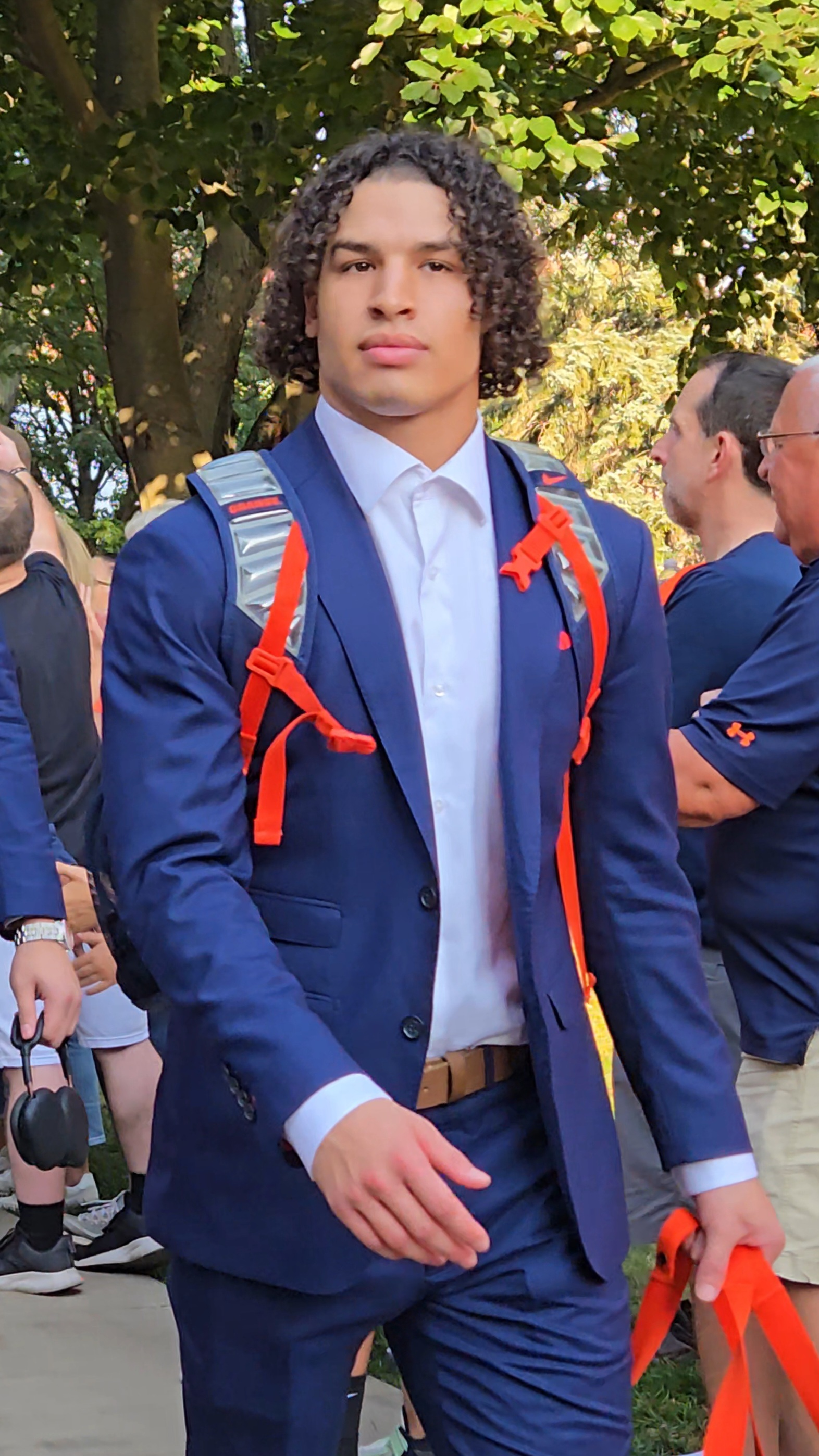
- Peña with the Syracuse Orange in 2024

No. 86 – Jacksonville Jaguars
- Position: Wide receiver
- Roster status: Practice squad

Personal information
- Born: February 21, 2002 (age 24); The Bronx, New York, U.S.
- Listed height: 5 ft 10 in (1.78 m)
- Listed weight: 187 lb (85 kg)

Career information
- High school: Ocean Township (Ocean Township, New Jersey)
- College: Syracuse (2020–2024); Penn State (2025)
- NFL draft: 2026: undrafted

Career history
- Jacksonville Jaguars (2026–present)*
- * Offseason or practice squad member only

Awards and highlights
- Second-team All-ACC (2024)
- Stats at Pro Football Reference

Trebor D. Peña (TRAY-bor PAYN-yuh; born February 21, 2002) is an American professional football wide receiver for the Jacksonville Jaguars of the National Football League (NFL). He played college football at Syracuse and Penn State.

== Early life ==
Peña attended Ocean Township High School in Ocean Township, Monmouth County, New Jersey, where he was a track and field All-Shore Conference first-team selection and won the javelin, long jump and 4x100 relay events during his senior season. He had 1,550 yards rushing and 19 touchdowns during his senior season.

Peña was a three-star recruit per ESPN, On3 and 247Sports, while Rivals ranked him as a two-star prospect. He was offered by the Air Force, Army, Navy, Albany, and Bryant, and initially committed to Temple. His primary recruiter at Temple was Fran Brown, who would eventually take over head coaching position at Syracuse in 2024.

After getting his sole power-5 offer from Dino Babers, Peña de-committed from Temple and joined the Orange in November 2019.

== College career ==
=== Syracuse ===
During his true freshman season in 2020, Peña scored a 98-yard kickoff return touchdown against NC State. In 2021, he had only 67 receiving yards on two receptions.

In 2022 season, Peña played in all 13 games, totaling 22 receptions, 203 yards, 12 kick returns, 326 yards, and 21 punt returns with 182 yards. Peña didn't appear in any games during the 2023 season due to an undisclosed injury.

During the redshirt junior year in 2024, Peña had a breakout year catching for quarterback Kyle McCord. Primarily working as slot receiver under coach Ross Douglas, Peña became McCord's No. 1 option and excelled in shallow and deep depths of target. Peña set career-highs in every receiving category, including a team-best 871 yards on 79 catches, averaging 11.0 yards/receptions. He had 8 touchdowns and averaged 72.6 receiving yards per game. Along with Jackson Meeks and Oronde Gadsden II, Peña was one of the three Syracuse receivers who averaged 70+ yards per game. In the first game of the season against Ohio, Peña racked up a career-high three touchdowns and tallied 92 all-purpose yards. His career-high 128 yards on just six receptions came against No. 6 Miami.

Peña was named to the Paul Hornung Award watchlist.

On April 14, 2025, Peña entered the transfer portal.

=== Penn State ===
On April 26, 2025, Peña announced he would be transferring to Penn State.

== Professional career ==
Pre-draft measurables
Height	Weight	Arm length	Hand span	Wingspan	40-yard dash	10-yard split	20-yard split	20-yard shuttle	Three-cone drill	Vertical jump	Broad jump	Bench press
5 ft 10 in (1.78 m)	187 lb (85 kg)	29 1/4 in (0.74 m)	9 1/4 in (0.23 m)	5 ft 11 in (1.80 m)	4.52 s	1.57 s	2.52 s	4.11 s	6.90 s	35.5 in (0.90 m)	10 ft 3 in (3.12 m)	19 reps
All values from Pro Day

On April 26, 2026, Peña signed with the Jacksonville Jaguars as an undrafted free agent. On August 30, Peña was waived by Jacksonville as a part of final roster cuts; he was re-signed to the team's practice squad the next day.
