= Shawn Gibbs (American football) =

American football player and coach (born c. 1974)

Current position
- Title: Head coach
- Team: North Carolina A&T
- Conference: CAA
- Record: 2–12

Biographical details
- Born: c. 1974 (age 51–52); Black Mountain, North Carolina, U.S.

Playing career
- 1993–1997: North Carolina Central
- Position: Running back

Coaching career (HC unless noted)
- 2002: North Carolina A&T (TE)
- 2003–2006: North Carolina Central (RB)
- 2007–2010: Grambling State (RB)
- 2011–2021: North Carolina A&T (RB)
- 2022–2024: Fort Valley State
- 2025–present: North Carolina A&T

Head coaching record
- Overall: 24–21
- Bowls: 1–0

Shawn S. Gibbs (born c. 1974) is an American college football coach and former running back; He is the current head coach at North Carolina A&T State University, and previously served in the same role at Fort Valley State from 2022 to 2024. Gibbs previously served as a position coach at North Carolina A&T, North Carolina Central, and Grambling State.

== Head coaching record ==
Year	Team	Overall	Conference	Standing	Bowl/playoffs
Fort Valley State Wildcats (Southern Intercollegiate Athletic Conference) (2022–2024)
2022	Fort Valley State	8–2	5–2	T–2nd (East)	
2023	Fort Valley State	8–3	6–2	T–2nd	W Florida Beach
2024	Fort Valley State	6–4	6–2	T–2nd	
Fort Valley State:		22–9	17–6		
North Carolina A&T Aggies (Coastal Athletic Association Football Conference) (2025–present)
2025	North Carolina A&T	2–10	2–6	T–10th	
2026	North Carolina A&T	0–2	0–0		
North Carolina A&T:		2–12	2–6		
Total:		24–21			
