= 2025 Bryant Bulldogs football team =

American college football season

2025 Bryant Bulldogs football
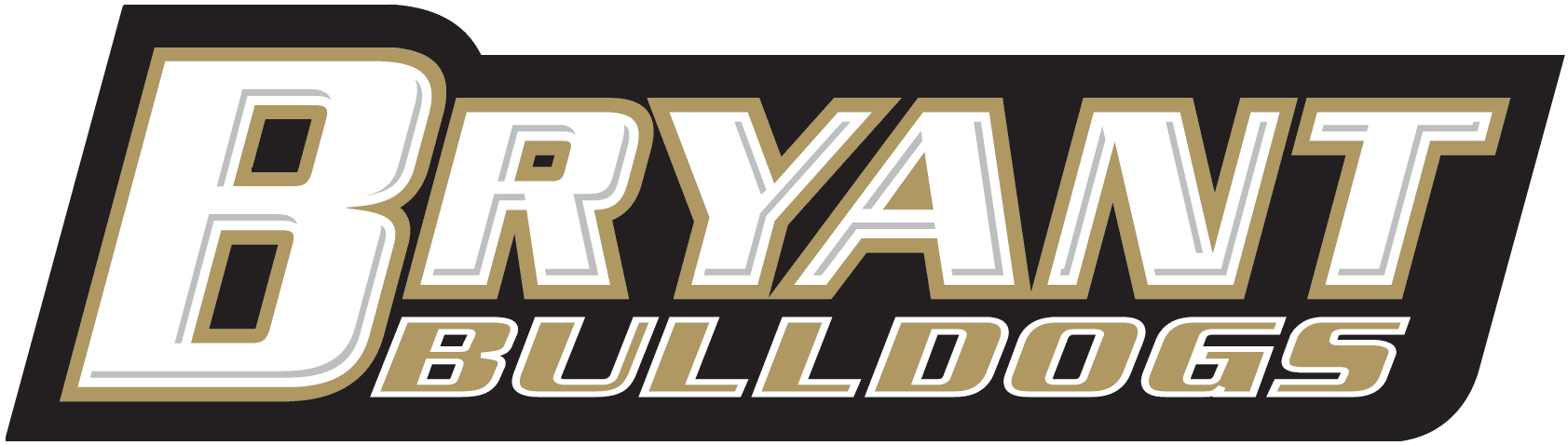
- Conference: CAA Football
- Record: 3–9 (1–7 CAA)
- Head coach: Chris Merritt (7th season)
- Offensive coordinator: Ben McKaig (2nd season)
- Defensive coordinator: Anthony Barese (6th season)
- Home stadium: Beirne Stadium

2025 Coastal Athletic Association Football Conference standings
	Conf.			Overall
Team	W		L	W		L
No. 11 Rhode Island $^	8	–	0	11	–	3
No. 4т Villanova ^	7	–	1	12	–	3
No. 23 New Hampshire ^	6	–	2	8	–	5
No. 22 Monmouth	6	–	2	9	–	3
William & Mary	6	–	2	7	–	5
Maine	5	–	3	6	–	6
Elon	4	–	4	6	–	6
Stony Brook	4	–	4	6	–	6
Towson	4	–	4	6	–	6
North Carolina A&T	2	–	6	2	–	10
Campbell	2	–	6	2	–	10
Bryant	1	–	7	3	–	9
Albany	1	–	7	2	–	10
Hampton	0	–	8	2	–	10
$ – Conference champion; ^ – FCS playoff participant; Rankings from STATS Poll

The 2025 Bryant Bulldogs football team represented Bryant University as a member of the Coastal Athletic Association Football Conference (CAA Football) during the 2025 NCAA Division I FCS football season. The Bulldogs were led by seventh-year head coach Chris Merritt and played their home games at Beirne Stadium in Smithfield, Rhode Island.

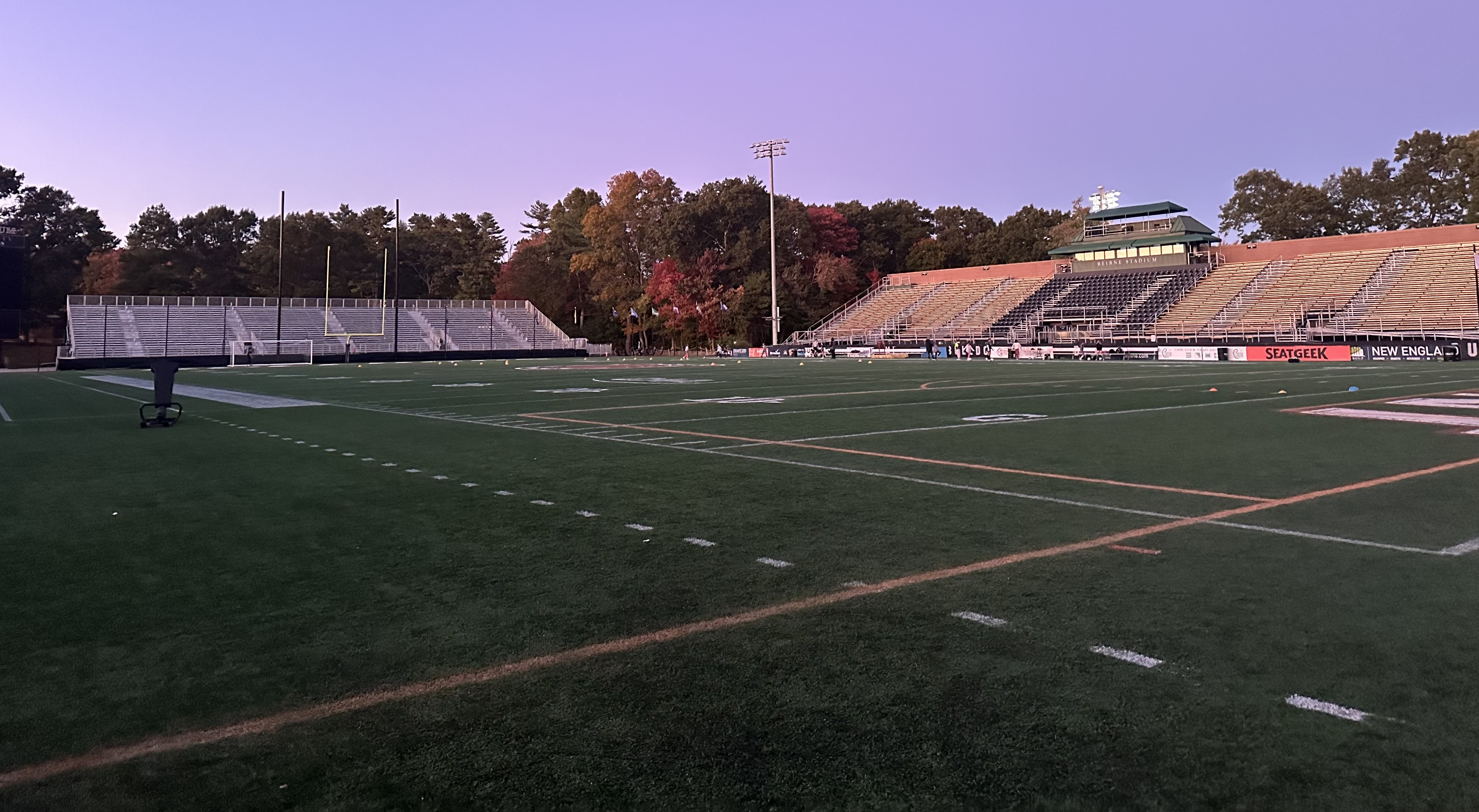
Beirne Stadium in 2024

This season was the team's second as a member of CAA Football after leaving the Big South–OVC Football Association following the 2023 season.

A highlight of the season would be achieving their first ever win over an FBS opponent in school history, coming off in Week 2 over UMass.

== Schedule ==
Date	Time	Opponent	Site	TV	Result	Attendance
August 30	9:00 p.m.	at New Mexico State*	Aggie Memorial Stadium; Las Cruces, NM	ESPN+	L 3–19	10,058
September 6	3:30 p.m.	at UMass*	McGuirk Alumni Stadium; Amherst, MA	ESPN+	W 27–26	3,714
September 13	6:00 p.m.	Bentley*	Beirne Stadium; Smithfield, RI	FloSports	W 42–6	2,800
September 20	6:00 p.m.	at Campbell	Barker-Lane Stadium; Buies Creek, NC	FloSports	L 48–50 ^{2OT}	3,389
September 27	1:00 p.m.	Towson	Beirne Stadium; Smithfield, RI	FloSports	L 24–26	1,200
October 4	2:00 p.m.	Maine^{†}	Beirne Stadium; Smithfield, RI	FloSports	L 14–34	2,867
October 10	7:00 p.m.	Brown*	Beirne Stadium; Smithfield, RI	FloSports	L 19–29	1,800
October 25	1:00 p.m.	at No. 13 Rhode Island	Meade Stadium; Kingston, RI	FloSports	L 17–38	5,771
November 1	1:00 p.m.	No. 10 Monmouth	Beirne Stadium; Smithfield, RI	FloSports	L 7–35	2,500
November 8	1:00 p.m.	at Albany	Bob Ford Field; Albany, NY	FloSports	W 27–24	2,547
November 15	12:00 p.m.	New Hampshire	Beirne Stadium; Smithfield, RI	FloSports	L 14–42	1,007
November 22	12:00 p.m.	at Stony Brook	Kenneth P. LaValle Stadium; Stony Brook, NY	FloSports	L 28–35	3,027
*Non-conference game; ^{†}Homecoming; Rankings from STATS Poll released prior to the game; All times are in Eastern time

== Game summaries ==
=== at New Mexico State (FBS) ===
Game One – Bryant Bulldogs (0–0) at New Mexico State Aggies (FBS) (0–0) – Game summary

Quarter	1	2	3	4	Total
Bulldogs	3	0	0	0	3
Aggies (FBS)	6	3	0	10	19

at Aggie Memorial Stadium • Las Cruces, New Mexico

- Date: August 30
- Game time: 7:00 p.m. MDT
- Game attendance: 10,058
- Referee: Brad Carrell
- TV announcers (ESPN+): Adam Young (play-by-play), Danny Knee (analyst) and Kelly Horyczun (sideline)

Game information

First quarter

- NMSU – PJ Johnson III 24-yard pass from Logan Fife (Ryan Hawk kick BLOCKED), 10:02. Aggies 6–0. Drive: 6 plays, 82 yards, 3:05.
- BRY – Bryce Soli 43-yard field goal, 4:08. Aggies 6–3. Drive: 13 plays, 49 yards, 5:54.

Second quarter

- NMSU – Ryan Hawk 41-yard field goal, 13:33. Aggies 9–3. Drive: 11 plays, 66 yards, 5:26.

Third quarter

- No scoring plays.

Fourth quarter

- NMSU – Ryan Hawk 27-yard field goal, 12:10. Aggies 12–3. Drive: 9 plays, 55 yards, 2:16.
- NMSU – Kadarius Calloway 17-yard run (Ryan Hawk kick), 6:20. Aggies 19–3. Drive: 6 plays, 61 yards, 3:07.

Statistics	BRY	NMSU
First downs	16	19
Plays–yards	68–255	63–305
Rushes–yards	35–68	32–76
Passing yards	187	227
Passing: Comp–Att–Int	20–33–1	14–31–1
Turnovers	1	1
Time of possession	31:18	28:10

Team	Category	Player	Statistics
Bryant	Passing	Brennan Myer	20/33, 187 yards, INT
Bryant	Rushing	Dylan Kedzior	8 carries, 28 yards
Bryant	Receiving	Aldrich Doe	5 receptions, 54 yards
New Mexico State	Passing	Logan Fife	14/31, 227 yards, TD, INT
New Mexico State	Rushing	Kadarius Calloway	12 carries, 50 yards, TD
New Mexico State	Receiving	Donovan Faupel	5 receptions, 99 yards

=== at UMass (FBS) ===
Game Two – Bryant Bulldogs (0–1) at UMass Minutemen (FBS) (0–1) – Game summary

Quarter	1	2	3	4	Total
Bulldogs	0	10	14	3	27
Minutemen (FBS)	6	14	3	3	26

at McGuirk Alumni Stadium • Hadley, MA

- Date: Saturday September 6, 2025
- Game time: 3:30 PM EDT
- Game attendance: 3,714
- Referee: David Hergert
- TV announcers (ESPN+): Cooper Boardman (play-by-play) and Tre Watson (analyst)

Game information

First quarter

- MASS - Brennan Myer pass intercepted Tyler Martin return for 23 yds for a TD (Derek Morris PAT MISSED), 4:04, Minutemen 6–0.

Second quarter

- MASS – Brandon Hood 13-yard run, 13:06. Minutemen 13–0. Drive: 8 plays, 61 yards, 4:30.
- BRY – Bryce Soli 37-yard field goal, 9:18. Minutemen 13–3. Drive: 9 plays, 50 yards, 3:41.
- MASS – Grant Jordan 5-yard run, 3:32. Minutemen 20–3. Drive: 7 plays, 70 yards, 3:54.
- BRY – Zyheem Collick 9-yard pass from Brennan Myer, 0:48. Minutemen 20–10. Drive: 11 plays, 69 yards, 2:37.

Third quarter

- BRY – Elijah Elliot 43-yard pass from Brennan Myer, 8:38. Minutemen 20–17. Drive: 5 plays, 80 yards, 2:12.
- MASS – Derek Morris 25-yard field goal, 1:34. Minutemen 23–17. Drive: 7 plays, 44 yards, 2:08.
- BRY – Zyheem Collick 72-yard pass from Brennan Myer, 0:42. Bulldogs 24–23. Drive: 2 plays, 76 yards, 0:45.

Fourth quarter

- MASS – Derek Morris 53-yard field goal, 4:11. Minutemen 26–24. Drive: 13 plays, 53 yards, 5:13.
- BRY – Bryce Soli 25-yard field goal, 0:00. Bulldogs 27–26. Drive: 13 plays, 78 yards, 1:45.

Statistics	BRY	MASS
First downs	25	21
Plays–yards	70–399	67–358
Rushes–yards	25–81	35–101
Passing yards	318	257
Passing: Comp–Att–Int	22–45–2	20–32–1
Turnovers	2	1
Time of possession	23:55	36:05

Team	Category	Player	Statistics
Bryant	Passing	Brennan Myer	22/44, 318 yards, 3 TD, 2 INT
Bryant	Rushing	Elijah Elliot	11 carries, 47 yards
Bryant	Receiving	Zyheem Collick	3 receptions, 94 yards, 2 TD
UMass	Passing	Grant Jordan	13/22, 205 yards, INT
UMass	Rushing	Brand Hood	11 carries, 39 yards, TD
UMass	Receiving	Jacquon Gibson	7 receptions, 89 yards

=== Bentley (DII) ===
Bentley Falcons (DII) (0-1) at Bryant Bulldogs (1-1) – Game summary

Quarter	1	2	3	4	Total
Falcons (DII)	0	0	6	0	6
Bulldogs	14	7	7	14	42

at Beirne Stadium • Smithfield, RI

- Date: September 13
- Game time: 6:00 PM EDT
- Game weather: Sunny
- Game attendance: 2,800
- Referee: Cory Hanson
- TV announcers (FloSports): Thomas Zinzarella (play-by-play) and Tim Lynch (analyst)

Game information

First Quarter

- (12:26) BRY – Zyheem Collick 2-yard punt return, Bryce Soli kick (Bryant 7–0)
- (0:27) BRY – Tristen Riley 8-yard pass from Brennan Myer, Bryce Soli kick (Drive: 8 plays, 60 yards, 3:37; Bryant 14–0)

Second Quarter

- (1:16) BRY – Zyheem Collick 10-yard pass from Brennan Myer, Bryce Soli kick (Drive: 8 plays, 81 yards, 3:07; Bryant 21–0)

Third Quarter

- (9:16) BRY – Grant Robinson 1-yard run, Bryce Soli kick (Drive: 11 plays, 74 yards, 5:39; Bryant 28–0)
- (8:01) BEN – Nayvon Reid 62-yard pass from Isaiah Osgood (Drive: 3 plays, 69 yards, 1:10; Bryant 28–6)

Fourth Quarter

- (11:50) BRY – Elijah Elliott 32-yard run, Bryce Soli kick (Drive: 4 plays, 48 yards, 1:59; Bryant 35–6)
- (6:12) BRY – Dylan Kedzior 40-yard run, Bryce Soli kick (Drive: 5 plays, 53 yards, 2:21; Bryant 42–6)

Statistics	BENT	BRY
First downs	12	26
Total yards	194	395
Rushing yards	24	140
Passing yards	170	255
Passing: Comp–Att–Int	21–33–1	24–33–1
Time of possession	29:28	30:32

Team	Category	Player	Statistics
Bentley	Passing	Luke Warnock	18/30, 94 yards, INT
Bentley	Rushing	Isaiah Osgood	5 carries, 19 yards
Bentley	Receiving	Nayvon Reid	3 receptions, 73 yards, TD
Bryant	Passing	Brennan Myer	24/33, 255 yards, 2 TD, INT
Bryant	Rushing	Elijah Elliott	9 carries, 71 yards, TD
Bryant	Receiving	Zyheem Collick	6 receptions, 87 yards, TD

=== at Campbell ===
Bryant Bulldogs (2-1) at Campbell Fighting Camels (1-3) – Game summary

Quarter	1	2	3	4	OT	2OT	Total
Bulldogs	0	14	7	14	7	6	48
Fighting Camels	7	14	0	14	7	8	50

at Barker–Lane Stadium • Buies Creek, NC

- Date: September 20
- Game time: 6:00 PM EDT
- Game weather: Sunny
- Game attendance: 3,389
- Referee: Henry Wimberg
- TV announcers (FloSports): Chris Hemeyer (play-by-play) and Jay Sonnhalter (analyst)

Game information

First Quarter

- (9:05) CAM – Mike Chandler 18-yard pass from Kamden Sixkiller, Alex Crabb kick (Drive: 8 plays, 60 yards, 1:08; Campbell 7–0)

Second Quarter

- (14:21) BRY – Brennan Myer 1-yard run, Bryce Soli kick (Drive: 9 plays, 83 yards, 4:40; Tied 7–7)
- (11:25) CAM – Barry Tate 59-yard run, Alex Crabb kick (Drive: 6 plays, 81 yards, 2:50; Campbell 14–7)
- (0:30) CAM – Randall King 9-yard pass from Kamden Sixkiller, Alex Crabb kick (Drive: 10 plays, 61 yards, 3:46; Campbell 21–7)
- (0:17) BRY – Keylijah Williams 100-yard kickoff return, Bryce Soli kick (Campbell 21–14)

Third Quarter

- (3:31) BRY – Dylan Kedzior 49-yard run, Bryce Soli kick (Drive: 5 plays, 69 yards, 1:46; Tied 21–21)

Fourth Quarter

- (5:33) BRY – Liam Lindo 15-yard interception, Bryce Soli kick (Bryant 28–21)
- (2:58) CAM – Randall King 77-yard pass from Kamden Sixkiller, Alex Crabb kick (Drive: 1 play, 77 yards, 0:11; Tied 28–28)
- (1:15) CAM – Randall King 11-yard pass from Kamden Sixkiller, Alex Crabb kick (Drive: 3 plays, 53 yards, 0:40; Campbell 35–28)
- (0:06) BRY – Aldrich Doe 35-yard pass from Brennan Myer, Bryce Soli kick (Drive: 7 plays, 75 yards, 1:09; Tied 35–35)

Overtime

- BRY – Brennan Myer 18-yard run, Bryce Soli kick (Drive: 3 plays, 25 yards, 0:00; Bryant 42–35)
- CAM – Randall King 3-yard pass from Mike Chandler II, Alex Crabb kick (Drive: 5 plays, 25 yards, 0:00; Tied 42–42)

Second overtime

- CAM – Dawson Adams-Grenier 7-yard pass from Kamden Sixkiller, Naieem Kearney rush (Drive: 6 plays, 25 yards, 0:00; Campbell 50–42)
- BRY – Dylan Kedzior 7-yard run (Drive: 2 plays, 25 yards, 0:00; Campbell 50–48)

Statistics	BRY	CAM
First downs	19	27
Total yards	390	557
Rushing yards	175	220
Passing yards	215	337
Passing: Comp–Att–Int	15–34–2	30–50–2
Time of possession	27:37	32:23

Team	Category	Player	Statistics
Bryant	Passing	Brennan Myer	15/34, 215 yards, TD, 2 INT
Bryant	Rushing	Dylan Kedzior	13 carries, 93 yards, 2 TD
Bryant	Receiving	Aldrich Doe	5 receptions, 92 yards, TD
Campbell	Passing	Kamden Sixkiller	29/48, 334 yards, 5 TD, 2 INT
Campbell	Rushing	Barry Tate	1 carry, 59 yards, TD
Campbell	Receiving	Randall King	8 receptions, 142 yards, 4 TD

=== Towson ===
Towson Tigers (2-2) vs. Bryant Bulldogs (2-2) – Game summary

Quarter	1	2	3	4	Total
Tigers	3	10	10	3	26
Bulldogs	3	6	0	15	24

at Beirne Stadium • Smithfield, RI

- Date: September 27
- Game time: 1:00 PM EDT
- Game weather: Sunny
- Game attendance: 1,200
- Referee: Jeremy DeAngulo
- TV announcers (FloSports): Jake Zimmer (play-by-play) and Tim Lynch (analyst)

Game information

First Quarter

- (10:22) TOW – Caden Williams 45-yard field goal (Drive: 9 plays, 29 yards, 3:21; Towson 3–0)
- (2:21) BRY – Bryce Soli 21-yard field goal (Drive: 16 plays, 46 yards, 7:58; Tied 3–3)

Second Quarter

- (14:09) TOW – Caden Williams 36-yard field goal (Drive: 10 plays, 30 yards, 3:04; Towson 6–3)
- (1:43) TOW – Al Wooten II 1-yard run, Caden Williams kick (Drive: 7 plays, 40 yards, 1:55; Towson 13–3)
- (0:48) BRY – Elijah Elliott 22-yard pass from Brennan Myer (Drive: 7 plays, 70 yards, 0:51; Towson 13–9)

Third Quarter

- (11:01) TOW – Jaceon Doss 25-yard pass from Andrew Indorf, Caden Williams kick (Drive: 9 plays, 75 yards, 3:59; Towson 20–9)
- (3:34) TOW – Caden Williams 28-yard field goal (Drive: 9 plays, 44 yards, 4:14; Towson 23–9)

Fourth Quarter

- (14:52) BRY – Elijah Elliott 12-yard run, Bryce Soli kick (Drive: 7 plays, 55 yards, 3:37; Towson 23–16)
- (8:22) BRY – Lonnie Rice 0-yard safety (Towson 23–18)
- (2:37) TOW – Caden Williams 21-yard field goal (Drive: 8 plays, 32 yards, 5:03; Towson 26–18)
- (0:23) BRY – Elijah Elliott 3-yard run (Drive: 12 plays, 67 yards, 2:10; Towson 26–24)

Statistics	TOW	BRY
First downs	18	21
Total yards	308	347
Rushing yards	155	129
Passing yards	153	218
Passing: Comp–Att–Int	17–31–0	22–36–1
Time of possession	33:21	26:39

Team	Category	Player	Statistics
Towson	Passing	Andrew Indorf	17/31, 153 yards, TD
Towson	Rushing	Al Wooten II	26 carries, 104 yards, TD
Towson	Receiving	Jaceon Doss	3 receptions, 41 yards, TD
Bryant	Passing	Brennan Myer	22/36, 218 yards, TD, INT
Bryant	Rushing	Elijah Elliott	19 carries, 100 yards, 2 TD
Bryant	Receiving	Aldrich Doe	5 receptions, 57 yards

=== Maine ===
Maine Black Bears (1-4) vs. Bryant Bulldogs (2-3) – Game summary

Quarter	1	2	3	4	Total
Black Bears	17	17	0	0	34
Bulldogs	0	0	0	14	14

at Beirne Stadium • Smithfield, RI

- Date: October 4
- Game time: 2:00 PM EDT
- Game weather: Sunny
- Game attendance: 2,867
- Referee: Todd Boyd
- TV announcers (FloSports): Thomaas Zinzarella (play-by-play) and Tim Lynch (analyst)

Game information

First Quarter

- (11:34) ME – Scott Woods 66-yard pass from Carter Peevy, Samuel Tremblay kick (Drive: 4 plays, 79 yards, 1:38; Maine 7–0)
- (8:54) ME – Samuel Tremblay 29-yard field goal (Drive: 7 plays, 15 yards, 2:26; Maine 10–0)
- (6:58) ME – Trevin Ewing 15-yard run, Samuel Tremblay kick (Drive: 2 plays, 20 yards, 0:50; Maine 17–0)

Second Quarter

- (9:18) ME – Nick Laughlin 64-yard pass from Carter Peevy, Samuel Tremblay kick (Drive: 3 plays, 83 yards, 1:11; Maine 24–0)
- (3:55) ME – Samuel Tremblay 33-yard field goal (Drive: 7 plays, 12 yards, 2:54; Maine 24–0)
- (0:25) ME – Scott Woods 14-yard pass from Carter Peevy, Samuel Tremblay kick (Drive: 10 plays, 80 yards, 2:00; Maine 34–0)

Third Quarter

No scoring plays

Fourth Quarter

- (14:47) BRY – Jaden Keefner 12-yard run, Nicholas Stoyanovich kick (Drive: 4 plays, 60 yards, 1:30; Maine 34–7)
- (1:40) BRY – Jaden Keefner 6-yard run, Nicholas Stoyanovich kick (Drive: 4 plays, 75 yards, 1:03; Maine 34–14)

Statistics	ME	BRY
First downs	20	17
Total yards	421	253
Rushing yards	83	144
Passing yards	338	109
Passing: Comp–Att–Int	23–36–0	10–25–1
Time of possession	34:04	25:56

Team	Category	Player	Statistics
Maine	Passing	Carter Peevy	23/36, 338 yards, 3 TD
Maine	Rushing	Sincere Baines	13 carries, 52 yards
Maine	Receiving	Scott Woods	5 receptions, 103 yards, 2 TD
Bryant	Passing	Jaden Keefner	5/9, 76 yards
Bryant	Rushing	Jaden Keefner	12 carries, 83 yards, 2 TD
Bryant	Receiving	Zyheem Collick	2 receptions, 52 yards

=== Brown ===
Brown Bears (2-1) vs. Bryant Bulldogs (2-4) – Game summary

Quarter	1	2	3	4	Total
Bears	0	0	15	14	29
Bulldogs	6	6	7	0	19

at Beirne Stadium • Smithfield, RI

- Date: October 10
- Game time: 7:00 PM EDT
- Game weather: Sunny
- Game attendance: 1,800
- Referee: Eric Lewis
- TV announcers (FloSports): Thomas Zinzarella (play-by-play) and Tim Lynch (analyst)

Game information

First Quarter

- (1:03) BRY – Elijah Elliott 14-yard run (Drive: 7 plays, 63 yards, 3:04; Bryant 6–0)

Second Quarter

- (1:54) BRY – Elijah Elliott 1-yard run (Drive: 12 plays, 93 yards, 7:11; Bryant 12–0)

Third Quarter

- (12:20) BRWN – Trevor Foley 47-yard pass from James Murphy, Drew Crabtree kick (Drive: 5 plays, 72 yards, 1:12; Bryant 12–7)
- (6:12) BRWN – Matt Childs 1-yard run, Levi Linowes pass (Drive: 11 plays, 71 yards, 4:04; Brown 15–12)
- (2:22) BRY – Aldrich Doe 16-yard pass from Jaden Keefner, Nicholas Stoyanovich kick (Drive: 7 plays, 65 yards, 3:45; Bryant 19–15)

Fourth Quarter

- (8:59) BRWN – Matt Childs 1-yard run, Drew Crabtree kick (Drive: 6 plays, 79 yards, 1:59; Brown 22–19)
- (4:21) BRWN – Qwentin Brown 26-yard run, Drew Crabtree kick (Drive: 7 plays, 69 yards, 3:40; Brown 29–19)

Statistics	BRWN	BRY
First downs	27	22
Total yards	460	350
Rushing yards	113	188
Passing yards	347	162
Passing: Comp–Att–Int	29–44–1	16–27–1
Time of possession	30:00	30:00

Team	Category	Player	Statistics
Brown	Passing	James Murphy	29/44, 347 yards, TD, INT
Brown	Rushing	Matt Childs	21 carries, 92 yards, 2 TD
Brown	Receiving	Solomon Miller	5 receptions, 56 yards
Bryant	Passing	Jaden Keefner	16/27, 162 yards, TD, INT
Bryant	Rushing	Elijah Elliott	21 carries, 116 yards, 2 TD
Bryant	Receiving	Zyheem Collick	7 receptions, 57 yards

=== at No. 13 Rhode Island ===
Bryant Bulldogs (2–5) at No. 13 Rhode Island Rams (6–2) – Game summary

Quarter	1	2	3	4	Total
Bulldogs	7	10	0	0	17
No. 13 Rams	14	10	7	7	38

at Meade Stadium • Kingston, RI

- Date: October 25
- Game time: 1:00 PM EDT
- Game weather: Sunny
- Game attendance: 5,771
- Referee: Marc Queen
- TV announcers (FloSports): Jonathan Blair (play-by-play) and Ryan Pelillo (analyst)

Game information

First quarter

- (8:00) BRY – Koby Keenan 11-yard pass from Jaden Keefner, Nicholas Stoyanovich kick (Drive: 12 plays, 79 yards, 6:47; Bryant 7–0)
- (3:02) URI – Gabe Winowich 51-yard run, Garth White kick (Drive: 5 plays, 82 yards, 2:15; Tied 7–7)
- (2:18) URI – Gabe Winowich 6-yard run, Garth White kick (Drive: 2 plays, 21 yards, 0:41; Rhode Island 14–7)

Second quarter

- (13:24) BRY – Nicholas Stoyanovich 24-yard field goal (Drive: 7 plays, 68 yards, 3:49; Rhode Island 14–10)
- (5:08) BRY – Elijah Elliott 1-yard run, Nicholas Stoyanovich kick (Drive: 11 plays, 80 yards, 6:02; Bryant 17–14)
- (1:55) URI – Kevin Schaeffer 27-yard pass from Devin Farrell, Garth White kick (Drive: 7 plays, 75 yards, 3:13; Rhode Island 21–17)
- (0:19) URI – Garth White 54-yard field goal (Drive: 7 plays, 23 yards, 0:37; Rhode Island 24–17)

Third quarter

- (6:13) URI – Greg Gaines 38-yard pass from Devin Farrell, Garth White kick (Drive: 2 plays, 44 yards, 1:08; Rhode Island 31–17)

Fourth quarter

- (2:12) URI – Ayinde Johnson 24-yard interception return, Garth White kick (Rhode Island 38–17)

Statistics	BRY	URI
First downs	26	14
Plays–yards	82–363	48–402
Rushes–yards	46–167	26–130
Passing yards	196	272
Passing: Comp–Att–Int	17–36–2	14–22–1
Turnovers	2	2
Time of possession	39:02	20:58

Team	Category	Player	Statistics
Bryant	Passing	Jaden Keefner	17/36, 196 yards, TD, 2 INT
Bryant	Rushing	Elijah Elliott	22 carries, 83 yards, TD
Bryant	Receiving	Elijah Elliott	5 receptions, 84 yards
Rhode Island	Passing	Devin Farrell	14/22, 272 yards, 2 TD, INT
Rhode Island	Rushing	Gabe Winowich	13 carries, 90 yards, 2 TD
Rhode Island	Receiving	Marquis Buchanan	3 receptions, 124 yards

=== No. 10 Monmouth ===
No. 10 Monmouth Hawks (7-1) vs. Bryant Bulldogs (2-6) – Game summary

Quarter	1	2	3	4	Total
No. 10 Hawks	7	14	7	7	35
Bulldogs	0	7	0	0	7

at Beirne Stadium • Smithfield, RI

- Date: November 1
- Game time: 1:00 PM EDT
- Game weather: Sunny • Wind: E at 12 miles per hour (19 km/h)
- Game attendance: 2,500
- Referee: Alex Parella
- TV: FloSports

Game information

First Quarter

- (8:50) MONM – Rodney Nelson 69-yard run, Hudson Fiene kick (Drive: 2 plays, 73 yards, 0:46; Monmouth 7-0)

Second Quarter

- (14:57) BRY – Koby Keenan 9-yard pass from Jaden Keefner, Nicholas Stoyanovich kick (Drive: 7 plays, 38 yards, 3:12; 7-7)
- (4:36) MONM – Rodney Nelson 3-yard run, Hudson Fiene kick (Drive: 7 plays, 64 yards, 2:26; Monmouth 14-7)
- (0:21) MONM – Tra Neal 41-yard pass from Frankie Weaver, Hudson Fiene kick (Drive: 4 plays, 70 yards, 0:46; Monmouth 21-7)

Third Quarter

- (4:17) MONM – Gavin Nelson 8-yard pass from Frankie Weaver, Hudson Fiene kick (Drive: 13 plays, 70 yards, 7:16; Monmouth 28-7)

Fourth Quarter

- (1:05) MONM – Elijah Jennings 6-yard run, Hudson Fiene kick (Drive: 13 plays, 80 yards, 8:44; Monmouth 35-7)

Statistics	MONM	BRY
First downs	22	14
Total yards	481	222
Rushing yards	263	59
Passing yards	218	163
Passing: Comp–Att–Int	14–19–2	15–34–0
Time of possession	34:36	25:24

Team	Category	Player	Statistics
Monmouth	Passing	Frankie Weaver	14/19, 218 yards, 2 TD, 2 INT
Monmouth	Rushing	Rodney Nelson	34 carries, 244 yards, 2 TD
Monmouth	Receiving	Josh Derry	4 receptions, 78 yards
Bryant	Passing	Jaden Keefner	15/34, 163 yards, TD
Bryant	Rushing	Elijah Elliott	16 carries, 45 yards
Bryant	Receiving	Zyheem Collick	3 receptions, 69 yards

=== at Albany ===
Bryant Bulldogs (2-7) vs. Albany Great Danes (1-8) – Game summary

Quarter	1	2	3	4	Total
Bulldogs	-	-	-	-	0
Great Danes	-	-	-	-	0

at Tom & Mary Casey Stadium • Albany, NY

- Date: November 8
- Game time: 1:00 PM EST
- TV: FloSports

Statistics	BRY	ALB
First downs		
Total yards		
Rushing yards		
Passing yards		
Passing: Comp–Att–Int		
Time of possession		

Team	Category	Player	Statistics
Bryant	Passing		
Bryant	Rushing		
Bryant	Receiving		
Albany	Passing		
Albany	Rushing		
Albany	Receiving		

=== New Hampshire ===
New Hampshire Wildcats (0-0) vs. Bryant Bulldogs (0-0) – Game summary

Quarter	1	2	3	4	Total
Wildcats	-	-	-	-	0
Bulldogs	-	-	-	-	0

at Beirne Stadium • Smithfield, RI

- Date: November 15
- Game time: 12:00 PM EST

Statistics	UNH	BRY
First downs		
Total yards		
Rushing yards		
Passing yards		
Passing: Comp–Att–Int		
Time of possession		

Team	Category	Player	Statistics
New Hampshire	Passing		
New Hampshire	Rushing		
New Hampshire	Receiving		
Bryant	Passing		
Bryant	Rushing		
Bryant	Receiving		

=== at Stony Brook ===
Bryant Bulldogs (0-0) vs. Stony Brook Seawolves (0-0) – Game summary

Quarter	1	2	3	4	Total
Bulldogs	-	-	-	-	0
Seawolves	-	-	-	-	0

at Kenneth P. LaValle Stadium • Stony Brook, NY

- Date: November 22
- Game time: 12:00 PM EST

Statistics	BRY	STBK
First downs		
Total yards		
Rushing yards		
Passing yards		
Passing: Comp–Att–Int		
Time of possession		

Team	Category	Player	Statistics
Bryant	Passing		
Bryant	Rushing		
Bryant	Receiving		
Stony Brook	Passing		
Stony Brook	Rushing		
Stony Brook	Receiving		
