= 2025 North Carolina A&T Aggies football team =

American college football season

2025 North Carolina A&T Aggies football
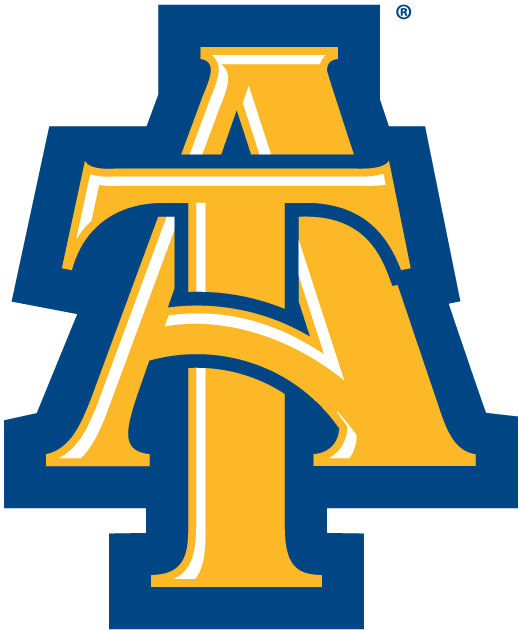
- Conference: CAA Football
- Record: 2–10 (2–6 CAA)
- Head coach: Shawn Gibbs (1st season)
- Offensive coordinator: Greg McGhee (1st season)
- Defensive coordinator: Denzel Jones (1st season)
- Home stadium: Truist Stadium

2025 Coastal Athletic Association Football Conference standings
	Conf.			Overall
Team	W		L	W		L
No. 11 Rhode Island $^	8	–	0	11	–	3
No. 4т Villanova ^	7	–	1	12	–	3
No. 23 New Hampshire ^	6	–	2	8	–	5
No. 22 Monmouth	6	–	2	9	–	3
William & Mary	6	–	2	7	–	5
Maine	5	–	3	6	–	6
Elon	4	–	4	6	–	6
Stony Brook	4	–	4	6	–	6
Towson	4	–	4	6	–	6
North Carolina A&T	2	–	6	2	–	10
Campbell	2	–	6	2	–	10
Bryant	1	–	7	3	–	9
Albany	1	–	7	2	–	10
Hampton	0	–	8	2	–	10
$ – Conference champion; ^ – FCS playoff participant; Rankings from STATS Poll

The 2025 North Carolina A&T Aggies football team represented North Carolina A&T State University as a member of the Coastal Athletic Association Football Conference (CAA) during the 2025 NCAA Division I FCS football season. The Aggies were led by first-year head coach Shawn Gibbs and played their home games at Truist Stadium in Greensboro, North Carolina.

The North Carolina A&T Aggies drew an average home attendance of 12,282, the 18th-highest of all NCAA Division I FCS football teams.

== Schedule ==
Date	Time	Opponent	Site	TV	Result	Attendance
August 30	4:30 p.m.	at Tennessee State*	Nissan Stadium; Nashville, TN	ESPN+	L 21–24	8,865
September 6	7:00 p.m.	at UCF*	Acrisure Bounce House; Orlando, FL	ESPN+	L 7–68	44,009
September 13	7:00 p.m.	Hampton	Truist Stadium; Greensboro, NC	FloSports	W 33–30 ^{2OT}	15,806
September 20	4:00 p.m.	North Carolina Central*	Truist Stadium; Greensboro, NC (rivalry)	FloSports	L 20–62	17,477
September 27	3:30 p.m.	at Maine	Alfond Stadium; Orono, ME	FloSports	L 30–37	5,033
October 4	3:30 p.m.	at William & Mary	Zable Stadium; Williamsburg, VA	FloSports	L 34–38	12,783
October 11	1:00 p.m.	South Carolina State*^{†}	Truist Stadium; Greensboro, NC (rivalry)	FloSports	L 16–22	21,500
October 25	1:00 p.m.	Campbell	Truist Stadium; Greensboro, NC	FloSports	W 28–24	7,468
November 1	12:00 p.m.	Towson	Truist Stadium; Greensboro, NC	FloSports	L 9–62	5,474
November 8	12:00 p.m.	at Stony Brook	Kenneth P. LaValle Stadium; Stony Brook, NY	FloSports	L 12–38	4,117
November 15	12:00 p.m.	No. 12 Monmouth	Truist Stadium; Greensboro, NC	FloSports	L 19–63	5,966
November 22	1:00 p.m.	at Elon	Rhodes Stadium; Elon, NC	FloSports	L 17–55	5,077
*Non-conference game; ^{†}Homecoming; Rankings from STATS Poll released prior to the game; All times are in Eastern time

== Game summaries ==
=== at Tennessee State ===
North Carolina A&T Aggies (0-0) at Tennessee State Tigers (0-0) – Game summary

Quarter	1	2	3	4	Total
Aggies	7	7	0	7	21
Tigers	7	3	7	7	24

at Nissan Stadium • Nashville, TN

- Date: Saturday August 30, 2025
- Game time: 3:30 PM CDT
- Game weather: Weather: Sunny • Temp: 85 °F (29 °C)
- Game attendance: 8,865
- Referee: Brandon McCain
- TV announcers (ESPN+): Dan Laing (play-by-play) and Darren Arbet (analyst)

Game information

First quarter

- (7:07) NCAT – Wesley Graves 40-yard rush (Andrew Brown kick) (Drive: 9 plays, 85 yards, 4:35; NCAT 7-0)
- (6:51) TNST – DeVaughn Slaughter 82-yard pass from Johathan Palmer (Freddy Perez kick) (Drive: 1 play, 82 yards, 0:11; Tied 7-7)

Second quarter

- (4:08) TNST – Freddy Perez 41-yard field goal (Drive: 7 plays, 1 yard, 3:10; TNST 10-7)
- (0:12) NCAT – Braxton Thomas 1-yard rush (Andrew Brown kick) (Drive: 4 plays, 33 yards, 1:08; NCAT 14-10)

Third quarter

- (5:51) TNST – Kendric Rhymes 60-yard rush (Freddy Perez kick) (Drive: 1 play, 60 yards, 0:10; TNST 17-14)

Fourth quarter

- (14:19) TNST – Kendric Rhymes 51-yard rush (Freddy Perez kick) (Drive: 3 plays, 57 yards, 0:50; TNST 24-14)
- (9:58) NCAT – Amonte Jones 66-yard pass from Braxton Thomas (Andrew Brown kick) (Drive: 7 plays, 83 yards, 4:17; TNST 24-21)

Statistics	NCAT	TNST
First downs	15	11
Total yards	335	252
Rushing yards	125	129
Passing yards	210	123
Passing: Comp–Att–Int	16–22–0	11–21–1
Time of possession	32:55	27:05

Team	Category	Player	Statistics
North Carolina A&T	Passing	Braxton Thomas	11/13, 169 yards, 1 TD
North Carolina A&T	Rushing	Wesley Graves	14 carries, 69 yards, 1 TD
North Carolina A&T	Receiving	Amonte Jones	4 receptions, 91 yards, 1 TD
Tennessee State	Passing	Jonathan Palmer	11/21, 123 yards, 1 TD, 1 INT
Tennessee State	Rushing	Kendric Rhymes	21 carries, 174 yards, 2 TD
Tennessee State	Receiving	DeVaughn Slaughter	4 receptions, 102 yards, 1 TD

=== at UCF (FBS) ===
North Carolina A&T Aggies (0-1) at UCF Knights (FBS) (1-0) – Game summary

Quarter	1	2	3	4	Total
Aggies	0	0	0	7	7
Knights (FBS)	28	12	14	14	68

at Acrisure Bounce House • Orlando, FL

- Date: September 6
- Game time: 7:00 PM EDT
- Game weather: Rain • Temperature: 80 °F (27 °C) • Wind: SW at 4 miles per hour (6.4 km/h)
- Game attendance: 44,009
- Referee: Luke Richmond
- TV announcers (ESPN+): Peter Sousa (play-by-play) and Todd Doxson (analyst)

Game information

First quarter

- UCF – Jaden Nixon 96-yard kickoff return (Noe Ruelas kick), 14:57, Knights 7–0.
- UCF – Tayven Jackson 1-yard run (Noe Ruelas kick), 9:46, Knights 14–0. 8 plays, 65 yards, 2:56.
- UCF – Tayven Jackson 4-yard run (Noe Ruelas kick), 7:16, Knights 21–0. 4 plays, 24 yards, 1:45.
- UCF – Rodney Lora fumble recovery in endzone (Noe Ruelas kick), 2:06, Knights 28–0.

Second quarter

- UCF – Jaden Nixon 87-yard run (kick failed), 9:46, Knights 34–0. 1 play, 87 yards, 0:09.
- UCF – Noe Ruelas 34-yard field goal, 3:37, Knights 37–0. Drive: 7 plays, 48 yards, 2:10.
- UCF – Noe Ruelas 36-yard field goal, 0:00, Knights 40–0. Drive: 6 plays, 71 yards, 0:57.

Third quarter

- UCF – Jaden Nixon 66-yard run (Noe Ruelas kick), 6:56, Knights 47–0. 3 play, 74 yards, 1:10.
- UCF – Jacurri Brown 60-yard run (Noe Ruelas kick), 6:56, Knights 54–0. 1 play, 60 yards, 0:11.

Fourth quarter

- UCF – Jacurri Brown 15-yard run (Noe Ruelas kick), 14:42, Knights 61–0. 4 plays, 25 yards, 1:41.
- UCF – Stacy Gage 23-yard run (Noe Ruelas kick), 7:41, Knights 68–0. 8 plays, 63 yards, 4:56.
- NCAT – Shimique Blizzard 17-yard run (Andrew Brown kick), 3:00, Knights 68–7. 7 plays, 75 yards, 4:41.

Statistics	NCAT	UCF
First downs	13	20
Plays–yards	62–200	56–560
Rushes–yards	51–160	32–356
Passing yards	40	204
Passing: Comp–Att–Int	5–11–1	14–24–0
Turnovers	3	0
Time of possession	36:15	24:04

Team	Category	Player	Statistics
North Carolina A&T	Passing	Champ Long	3/7, 26 yards, INT
North Carolina A&T	Rushing	Shimique Blizzard	11 carries, 75 yards, TD
North Carolina A&T	Receiving	Elijah Kennedy	2 receptions, 20 yards
UCF	Passing	Tayven Jackson	12/21, 189 yards
UCF	Rushing	Jaden Nixon	4 carries, 156 yards, 2 TD
UCF	Receiving	Duane Thomas Jr.	3 receptions, 68 yards

=== Hampton ===
Hampton Pirates (1-1) at North Carolina A&T Aggies (0-2) – Game summary

Quarter	1	2	3	4	Total
Pirates	-	-	-	-	0
Aggies	-	-	-	-	0

at Truist Stadium • Greensboro, NC

- Date: September 13
- Game time: 7:00 PM EDT
- TV: FloSports

Statistics	HAMP	NCAT
First downs		
Total yards		
Rushing yards		
Passing yards		
Passing: Comp–Att–Int		
Time of possession		

Team	Category	Player	Statistics
Hampton	Passing		
Hampton	Rushing		
Hampton	Receiving		
North Carolina A&T	Passing		
North Carolina A&T	Rushing		
North Carolina A&T	Receiving		

=== North Carolina Central (rivalry) ===
North Carolina Central Eagles (2-2) at North Carolina A&T Aggies (1-2) – Game summary

Quarter	1	2	3	4	Total
Eagles	-	-	-	-	0
Aggies	-	-	-	-	0

at Truist Stadium • Greensboro, NC

- Date: September 20
- Game time: 4:00 PM EDT
- TV: FloSports

Statistics	NCCU	NCAT
First downs		
Total yards		
Rushing yards		
Passing yards		
Passing: Comp–Att–Int		
Time of possession		

Team	Category	Player	Statistics
North Carolina Central	Passing		
North Carolina Central	Rushing		
North Carolina Central	Receiving		
North Carolina A&T	Passing		
North Carolina A&T	Rushing		
North Carolina A&T	Receiving		

=== at Maine ===
North Carolina A&T Aggies (1-3) vs. Maine Black Bears (0-4) – Game summary

Quarter	1	2	3	4	Total
Aggies	0	16	0	14	30
Black Bears	7	23	7	0	37

at Alfond Sports Stadium • Orono, ME

- Date: September 27
- Game time: 3:30 PM EDT
- TV: FloSports

Statistics	NCAT	ME
First downs		
Total yards		
Rushing yards		
Passing yards		
Passing: Comp–Att–Int		
Time of possession		

Team	Category	Player	Statistics
North Carolina A&T	Passing		
North Carolina A&T	Rushing		
North Carolina A&T	Receiving		
Maine	Passing		
Maine	Rushing		
Maine	Receiving		

=== at William & Mary ===
North Carolina A&T Aggies (1-4) vs. William & Mary Tribe (2-3) – Game summary

Quarter	1	2	3	4	Total
Aggies	7	17	10	0	34
Tribe	7	7	17	7	38

at Zable Stadium • Williamsburg, VA

- Date: October 4
- Game time: 3:30 PM EDT
- TV: FloSports

Statistics	NCAT	W&M
First downs		
Total yards		
Rushing yards		
Passing yards		
Passing: Comp–Att–Int		
Time of possession		

Team	Category	Player	Statistics
North Carolina A&T	Passing		
North Carolina A&T	Rushing		
North Carolina A&T	Receiving		
William & Mary	Passing		
William & Mary	Rushing		
William & Mary	Receiving		

=== South Carolina State (rivalry) ===
South Carolina State Bulldogs (3-3) at North Carolina A&T Aggies (1-5) – Game summary

Quarter	1	2	3	4	Total
Bulldogs	0	0	7	15	22
Aggies	0	9	0	7	16

at Truist Stadium • Greensboro, North Carolina

- Date: October 11
- Game time: 1:00 PM EDT
- Game weather: Sunny, 62 °F (17 °C)
- Game attendance: 21,500
- Referee: Tony Jomes
- TV: FloSports

Game information
First quarter
- No scoring plays

Second quarter

- NCAT – Andrew Brown 43-yard field goal, 12:20. Aggies 3–0. Drive: 13 plays, 69 yards, 6:09.
- NCAT – Andrew Brown 55-yard field goal, 3:33. Aggies 6–0. Drive: 7 plays, 18 yards, 3:50.
- NCAT – Andrew Brown 33-yard field goal, 0:00. Aggies 9–0. Drive: 9 plays, 45 yards, 2:10.

Third quarter

- SCST – Cyrus Ellison 43-yard pass from William Atkins IV (Nico Cavanillas Alti kick), 6:42. Aggies 9–7. Drive: 8 plays, 86 yards, 3:29.

Fourth quarter

- SCST – Josh Shaw 1-yard run (William Atkins IV pass to Cyrus Ellison), 11:49. Bulldogs 15–9. Drive: 3 plays, 9 yards, 1:38.
- SCST – Jordan Smith 23-yard pass from William Atkins IV (Nico Cavanillas Alti kick), 9:27. Bulldogs 22–9. Drive: 5 plays, 33 yards, 2:13.
- NCAT – Thomas Brown 11-yard pass from Kevin White (Andrew Brown kick), 3:05. Bulldogs 22–16. Drive: 5 plays, 55 yards, 1:05.

Statistics	SCST	NCAT
First downs	17	20
Total yards	294	241
Rushing yards	129	47
Passing yards	165	194
Passing: Comp–Att–Int	15–31–1	17–34–1
Time of possession	27:55	32:05

Team	Category	Player	Statistics
South Carolina State	Passing	William Atkins IV	10/21, 101 yards, 2 TD
South Carolina State	Rushing	Mason Pickett-Hicks	15 carries, 67 yards
South Carolina State	Receiving	Cyrus Ellison	4 receptions, 54 yards, TD
North Carolina A&T	Passing	Kevin White	17/34, 194 yards, TD, INT
North Carolina A&T	Rushing	Wesley Graves	15 carries, 66 yards
North Carolina A&T	Receiving	Jamison Warren	5 receptions, 57 yards

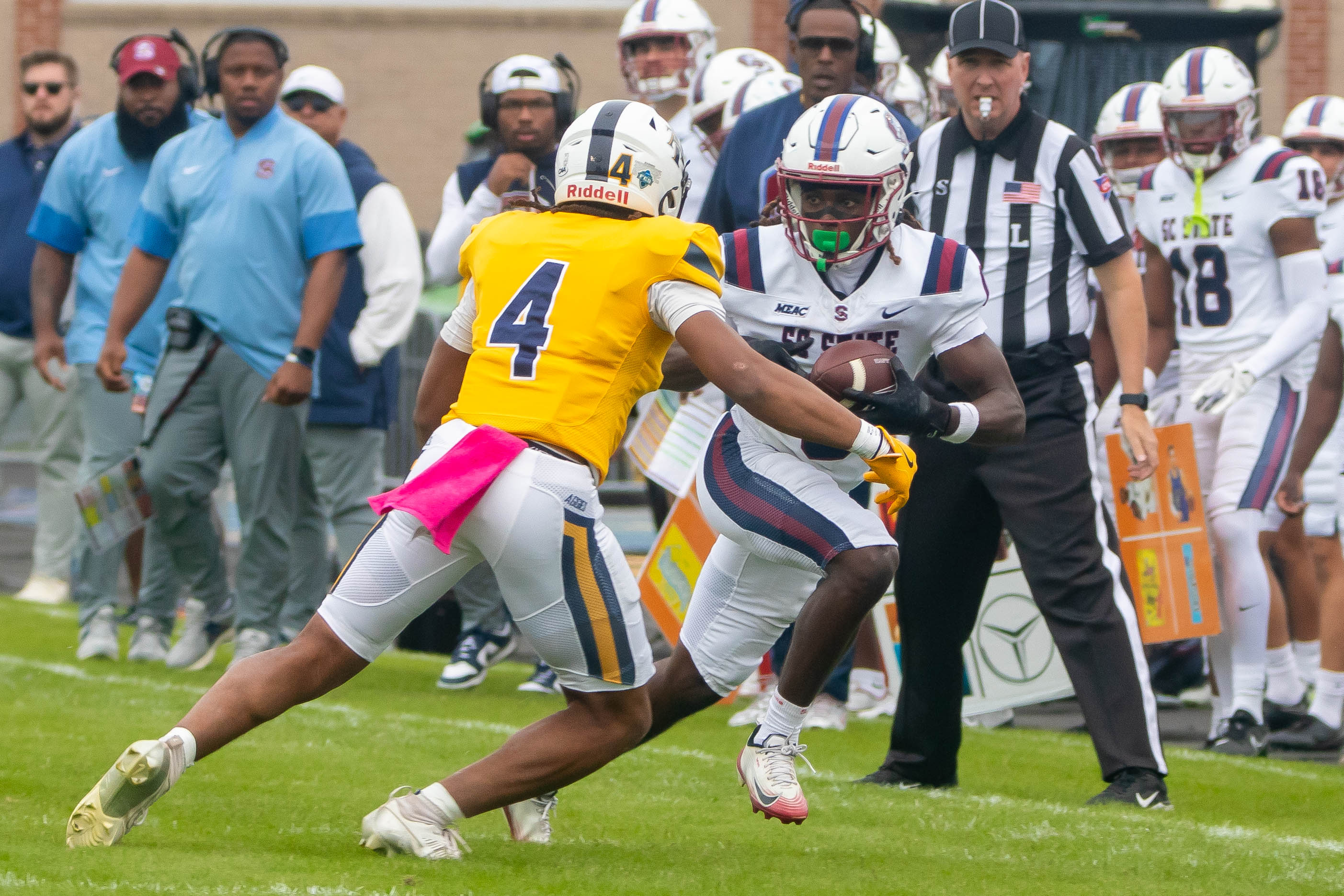
SCSU vs NCAT 2025

=== Campbell ===
Campbell Fighting Camels (2-6) vs. North Carolina A&T Aggies (1-6) – Game summary

Quarter	1	2	3	4	Total
Fighting Camels	-	-	-	-	0
Aggies	-	-	-	-	0

at Truist Stadium • Greensboro, NC

- Date: October 25
- Game time: 1:00 PM EDT

Statistics	CAM	NCAT
First downs		
Total yards		
Rushing yards		
Passing yards		
Passing: Comp–Att–Int		
Time of possession		

Team	Category	Player	Statistics
Campbell	Passing		
Campbell	Rushing		
Campbell	Receiving		
North Carolina A&T	Passing		
North Carolina A&T	Rushing		
North Carolina A&T	Receiving		

=== Towson ===
Towson Tigers (3-5) vs. North Carolina A&T Aggies (2-6) – Game summary

Quarter	1	2	3	4	Total
Tigers	-	-	-	-	0
Aggies	-	-	-	-	0

at Truist Stadium • Greensboro, NC

- Date: November 1
- Game time: 12:00 PM EDT

Statistics	TOW	NCAT
First downs		
Total yards		
Rushing yards		
Passing yards		
Passing: Comp–Att–Int		
Time of possession		

Team	Category	Player	Statistics
Towson	Passing		
Towson	Rushing		
Towson	Receiving		
North Carolina A&T	Passing		
North Carolina A&T	Rushing		
North Carolina A&T	Receiving		

=== at Stony Brook ===
North Carolina A&T Aggies (2-7) vs. Stony Brook Seawolves (4-5) – Game summary

Quarter	1	2	3	4	Total
Aggies	-	-	-	-	0
Seawolves	-	-	-	-	0

at Kenneth P. LaValle Stadium • Stony Brook, NY

- Date: November 8
- Game time: 12:00 PM EST

Statistics	NCAT	STBK
First downs		
Total yards		
Rushing yards		
Passing yards		
Passing: Comp–Att–Int		
Time of possession		

Team	Category	Player	Statistics
North Carolina A&T	Passing		
North Carolina A&T	Rushing		
North Carolina A&T	Receiving		
Stony Brook	Passing		
Stony Brook	Rushing		
Stony Brook	Receiving		

=== No. 12 Monmouth ===
No. 12 Monmouth Hawks (8-2) vs. North Carolina A&T Aggies (2-7) – Game summary

Quarter	1	2	3	4	Total
No. 12 Hawks	-	-	-	-	0
Aggies	-	-	-	-	0

at Truist Stadium • Greensboro, NC

- Date: November 15
- Game time: 12:00 PM EST

Statistics	MONM	NCAT
First downs		
Total yards		
Rushing yards		
Passing yards		
Passing: Comp–Att–Int		
Time of possession		

Team	Category	Player	Statistics
Monmouth	Passing		
Monmouth	Rushing		
Monmouth	Receiving		
North Carolina A&T	Passing		
North Carolina A&T	Rushing		
North Carolina A&T	Receiving		

=== at Elon ===
North Carolina A&T Aggies (0-0) vs. Elon Phoenix (0-0) – Game summary

Quarter	1	2	3	4	Total
Aggies	-	-	-	-	0
Phoenix	-	-	-	-	0

at Rhodes Stadium • Elon, NC

- Date: November 22
- Game time: 2:00 PM EST

Statistics	NCAT	ELON
First downs		
Total yards		
Rushing yards		
Passing yards		
Passing: Comp–Att–Int		
Time of possession		

Team	Category	Player	Statistics
North Carolina A&T	Passing		
North Carolina A&T	Rushing		
North Carolina A&T	Receiving		
Elon	Passing		
Elon	Rushing		
Elon	Receiving		
