= 2025 Albany Great Danes football team =

American college football season

2025 Albany Great Danes football
- Conference: CAA Football
- Record: 2–10 (1–7 CAA)
- Head coach: Jared Ambrose (interim; 1st season)
- Offensive coordinator: Will Fiacchi (1st season)
- Defensive coordinator: Bill Nesselt (9th season)
- Home stadium: Bob Ford Field at Tom & Mary Casey Stadium

2025 Coastal Athletic Association Football Conference standings
	Conf.			Overall
Team	W		L	W		L
No. 11 Rhode Island $^	8	–	0	11	–	3
No. 4т Villanova ^	7	–	1	12	–	3
No. 23 New Hampshire ^	6	–	2	8	–	5
No. 22 Monmouth	6	–	2	9	–	3
William & Mary	6	–	2	7	–	5
Maine	5	–	3	6	–	6
Elon	4	–	4	6	–	6
Stony Brook	4	–	4	6	–	6
Towson	4	–	4	6	–	6
North Carolina A&T	2	–	6	2	–	10
Campbell	2	–	6	2	–	10
Bryant	1	–	7	3	–	9
Albany	1	–	7	2	–	10
Hampton	0	–	8	2	–	10
$ – Conference champion; ^ – FCS playoff participant; Rankings from STATS Poll

The 2025 Albany Great Danes football team represented the University of Albany as a member of the Coastal Athletic Association Football Conference (CAA Football) during the 2025 NCAA Division I FCS football season. The Great Danes were led by 1st-year interim head coach Jared Ambrose and played their home games at Tom & Mary Casey Stadium in Albany, New York.

== Schedule ==
Date	Time	Opponent	Site	TV	Result	Attendance
August 30	6:00 p.m.	at Iowa*	Kinnick Stadium; Iowa City, IA	FS1	L 7–34	69,250
September 6	1:00 p.m.	at Delaware State*	Alumni Stadium; Dover, DE	ESPN+	L 32–37	4,506
September 13	7:00 p.m.	New Haven*	Tom & Mary Casey Stadium; Albany, NY	FloFootball	L 17–24	6,629
September 20	7:00 p.m.	Cornell*	Tom & Mary Casey Stadium; Albany, NY	FloFootball	W 13–10	4,819
September 27	1:00 p.m.	at New Hampshire	Wildcat Stadium; Durham, NH	FloFootball	L 6–24	5,691
October 4	3:30 p.m.	Stony Brook	Tom & Mary Casey Stadium; Albany, NY (rivalry)	FloFootball	L 12–47	6,051
October 18	3:30 p.m.	No. 16 Rhode Island^{†}	Tom & Mary Casey Stadium; Albany, NY	FloFootball	L 17–58	6,158
October 25	3:30 p.m.	at No. 11 Villanova	Villanova Stadium; Villanova, PA	FloFootball	L 16–29	4,101
November 1	3:30 p.m.	at William & Mary	Zable Stadium; Williamsburg, VA	FloFootball	L 7–37	9,775
November 8	1:00 p.m.	Bryant	Tom & Mary Casey Stadium; Albany, NY	FloFootball	L 24–27	2,547
November 15	1:00 p.m.	Towson	Tom & Mary Casey Stadium; Albany, NY	FloFootball	L 19–36	2,207
November 22	12:00 p.m.	at No. 12 Monmouth	Kessler Field; West Long Branch, NJ	FloFootball	W 31–24	2,813
*Non-conference game; ^{†}Homecoming; Rankings from STATS Poll released prior to the game; All times are in Eastern time

== Game summaries ==
=== at Iowa (FBS) ===
Albany Great Danes (0–0) at Iowa Hawkeyes (FBS) (0–0) – Game summary

Quarter	1	2	3	4	Total
Great Danes	0	7	0	0	7
Hawkeyes (FBS)	3	14	7	10	34

at Kinnick Stadium • Iowa City, Iowa

- Date: August 30
- Game time: 5:00 p.m.
- Game weather: 78 °F (26 °C), Sunny, Wind E 8 mph (13 km/h)
- Game attendance: 69,250
- Referee: Jim Wharrie
- TV announcers (FS1): Eric Collins (play-by-play) and Spencer Tillman (analyst)

Game information

First quarter

- 8:51 IOWA – Drew Stevens 28-yard field goal (Drive: 13 plays, 55 yards, 6:09; Iowa 3–0)

Second quarter

- 11:33 ALB – Lasalle Rose Jr. 9-yard pass from Jack Shields (James Bozek kick) (Drive: 13 plays, 55 yards, 6:09; Albany 7–3)
- 7:28 IOWA – Xavier Williams 3-yard run (Drew Stevens kick) (Drive: 7 plays, 65 yards, 4:05; Iowa 10–7)
- 1:51 IOWA – Kaden Wetjen 2-yard pass from Mark Gronowski (Drew Stevens kick) (Drive: 7 plays, 61 yards, 2:49; Iowa 17–7)

Third quarter

- 5:27 IOWA – Mark Gronowski 1-yard run (Drew Stevens kick) (Drive: 14 plays, 60 yards, 8:28; Iowa 24–7)

Fourth quarter

- 14:18 IOWA – Drew Stevens 55-yard field goal (Drive: 10 plays, 49 yards, 4:58; Iowa 27–7)
- 3:42 IOWA – Hank Brown 1-yard run (Drew Stevens kick) (Drive: 12 plays, 66 yards, 6:54; Iowa 34–7)

Statistics	ALB	IOWA
First downs	9	20
Plays–yards	47–177	69–358
Rushes–yards	21–43	53–310
Passing yards	134	48
Passing: comp–att–int	13–26–0	9–16–0
Turnovers	0	1
Time of possession	23:23	36:37

Team	Category	Player	Statistics
Albany	Passing	Jack Shields	13/26, 134 yards, TD
Albany	Rushing	Jack Shields	12 carries, 30 yards
Albany	Receiving	Caden Burti	3 receptions, 56 yards
Iowa	Passing	Mark Gronowski	8/15, 44 yards, TD
Iowa	Rushing	Xavier Williams	11 carries, 122 yards, TD
Iowa	Receiving	Jacob Gill	1 reception, 13 yards

=== at Delaware State ===
Albany Great Danes (0–1) vs. Delaware State Hornets (0–1) – Game summary

Quarter	1	2	3	4	Total
Great Danes	14	6	0	12	32
Hornets	14	0	10	13	37

at Alumni Stadium • Dover, DE

- Date: September 6
- Game time: 1:00 p.m. EDT
- Game weather: Sunny • Temperature: 89 °F (32 °C) • Wind: SW at 12 miles per hour (19 km/h)
- Game attendance: 4,506
- Referee: Javarro Edwards
- TV announcers (ESPN+): Darren Zaslau (play-by-play) & Gene Clemons (analyst)

Game information

First Quarter

- ALB – Tavahri Groves 75-yard pass from Jack Shields (James Bozek kick), 14:18. Great Danes 3–0. Drive: 2 plays, 75 yards, 0:42
- DSU – Kaiden Bennett 19-yard run (Patrick Fisher-Butler kick), 8:15. Hornets 7–3. Drive: 6 plays, 80 yards, 1:32.
- ALB – Jack Shields 1-yard run (James Bozek kick), 7:16. Great Danes 14–7. Drive: 13 plays, 50 yards, 6:12.
- DSU – Kaiden Bennett 37-yard run (Patrick Fisher-Butler kick), 1:10. Tied 14–14. Drive: 8 plays, 75 yards, 3:14.

Second Quarter

- ALB – Caden Burti 75-yard pass from Jack Shields (kick failed), 1:03. Great Danes 20–14. Drive: 10 plays, 71 yards, 4:12

Third Quarter

- DSU – Marquis Gillis 26-yard run (Patrick Fisher-Butler kick), 12:00. Hornets 21–20. Drive: 7 plays, 68 yards, 2:50.
- DSU – Patrick Fisher-Butler 34-yard field goal, 4:46. Hornets 24–20. Drive: 13 plays, 50 yards, 6:12.

Fourth Quarter

- DSU – Sean Weston 7-yard run (Patrick Fisher-Butler kick), 9:21. Hornets 31–20. Drive: 16 plays, 86 yards, 7:23.
- ALB – Tavahri Groves 17-yard pass from Jack Shields (pass failed), 8:03. Hornets 31–26. Drive: 4 plays, 75 yards, 1:18
- ALB – Steven Mahar Jr. 7-yard pass from Jack Shields (pass failed), 4:38. Great Danes 32–31. Drive: 3 plays, 13 yards, 1:31
- DSU – Kaiden Bennett 27-yard run (pass failed), 0:34. Hornets 37–32. Drive: 14 plays, 72 yards, 4:04

Statistics	ALB	DSU
First downs	18	30
Total yards	431	548
Rushing yards	101	371
Passing yards	330	177
Passing: comp–att–int	21–35–0	19–29–0
Time of possession	24:50	35:10

Team	Category	Player	Statistics
Albany	Passing	Jack Shields	21/35, 330 yards, 4 TD
Albany	Rushing	Jojo Uga	8 carries, 41 yards
Albany	Receiving	Tavahri Groves	3 receptions, 131 yards, TD
Delaware State	Passing	Kaiden Bennett	17/26, 141 yards
Delaware State	Rushing	Marquis Gillis	23 carries, 123 yards, TD
Delaware State	Receiving	Nathan Stewart	3 receptions, 39 yards

=== New Haven ===
New Haven Chargers (0-2) vs. Albany Great Danes (0-2) – Game summary

Quarter	1	2	3	4	Total
Chargers	10	14	0	0	24
Great Danes	0	7	7	3	17

at Tom & Mary Casey Stadium • Albany, NY

- Date: September 13
- Game time: 7:00 p.m. EDT
- Game weather: Cloudy • Temperature: 74 °F (23 °C) • Wind: N at 5 miles per hour (8.0 km/h)
- Game attendance: 6,629
- Referee: Terry Jones
- TV announcers (FloFootball): Rodger Wyland (play-by-play) and Michael Johnson Jr. (analyst)

Game information

First Quarter

- NH – Liam Quigley 38-yard field goal, 7:45. Chargers 3-0. Drive: 8 plays, 47 yards, 3:36
- NH – Matt Chandler 12-yard pass from AJ Duffy (Liam Quigley kick), 1:42. Chargers 10-0. Drive: 6 plays, 63 yards, 2:21

Second Quarter

- NH – Evan Chieca 3-yard pass from AJ Duffy (Liam Quigley kick), 8:10. Chargers 17-0. Drive: 14 plays, 53 yards, 7:20
- NH – Kevonne Wilder 21-yard pass from AJ Duffy (Liam Quigley kick), 5:01. Chargers 24-0. Drive: 4 plays, 44 yards, 1:37
- ALB – Griffin Woodell 1-yard run (James Bozek kick), 1:57. Chargers 24-7. Drive: 10 plays, 75 yards, 3:04

Third Quarter

- ALB – Tavahri Groves 13-yard pass from Jack Shields (James Bozek kick), 7:40. Chargers 24-14. Drive: 9 plays, 52 yards, 4:15

Fourth Quarter

- ALB – James Bozek 45-yard field goal, 5:59. Chargers 24-17. Drive: 9 plays, 46 yards, 4:52

Statistics	NH	ALB
First downs	20	24
Total yards	294	449
Rushing yards	114	40
Passing yards	180	409
Passing: Comp–Att–Int	23–35–0	31–54–2
Time of possession	27:45	32:15

Team	Category	Player	Statistics
New Haven	Passing	AJ Duffy	23/35, 180 yards, 3 TD
New Haven	Rushing	Brian Thomas	11 carries, 43 yards
New Haven	Receiving	Joshua Tracey	5 receptions, 65 yards
Albany	Passing	Jack Shields	31/53, 409 yards, TD, 2 INT
Albany	Rushing	Griffin Woodell	9 carries, 39 yards, TD
Albany	Receiving	Carter Moses	9 receptions, 119 yards

=== Cornell ===
Cornell Big Red (0-0) vs. Albany Great Danes (0-3) – Game summary

Quarter	1	2	3	4	Total
Big Red	0	0	3	7	10
Great Danes	3	3	0	7	13

at Tom & Mary Casey Stadium • Albany, NY

- Date: September 20
- Game time: 7:00 PM EDT
- Game weather: Sunny • Temperature: 60 °F (16 °C) • Wind: S at 3 miles per hour (4.8 km/h)
- Game attendance: 4,819
- Referee: Bill McKeever
- TV announcers (FloFootball): Rodger Wyland (play-by-play) and Michael Johnson Jr. (analyst)

Game information

First Quarter

- ALB – James Bozek 32-yard field goal, 1:04. Great Danes 3-0. Drive: 14 plays, 75 yards, 6:25

Second Quarter

- ALB – James Bozek 37-yard field goal, 1:40. Great Danes 6-0. Drive: 12 plays, 36 yards, 4:20

Third Quarter

- COR – Alan Zhao 25-yard field goal, 2:16. Great Danes 6-3. Drive: 8 plays, 33 yards, 3:00

Fourth Quarter

- ALB – Jojo Uga 43-yard run (James Bozek kick), 6:09. Great Danes 13-3. Drive: 5 plays, 71 yards, 2:21
- COR – Ryder Kurtz 6-yard pass from Devin Page (Alan Zhao kick), 3:38. Great Danes 13-10. Drive: 7 plays, 51 yards, 2:24

Statistics	COR	ALB
First downs	15	17
Total yards	260	268
Rushing yards	107	153
Passing yards	153	115
Passing: Comp–Att–Int	16–26–1	13–30–1
Time of possession	26:18	33:42

Team	Category	Player	Statistics
Cornell	Passing	Devin Page	8/12, 90 yards, TD, INT
Cornell	Rushing	Devin Page	10 carries, 57 yards
Cornell	Receiving	Ryder Kurtz	6 receptions, 68 yards, TD
Albany	Passing	Jack Shields	7/19, 70 yards, INT
Albany	Rushing	Jojo Uga	18 carries, 126 yards, TD
Albany	Receiving	Kylen Austin	3 receptions, 34 yards

=== at New Hampshire ===
Albany Great Danes (1–3) at New Hampshire Wildcats (2–2) – Game summary

Quarter	1	2	3	4	Total
Great Danes	0	0	0	6	6
Wildcats	7	7	7	3	24

at Wildcat Stadium • Durham, NH

- Date: September 27
- Game time: 1:00 PM EDT
- Game weather: Sunny
- Game attendance: 5,691
- Referee: Justin Ackley
- TV announcers (FloFootball): Joe Weil (play-by-play) and Pete Webster (analyst)

Game information

First quarter

- UNH – Denzell Gibson 1-yard run (Nick Reed kick), 7:10. Wildcats 7-0. Drive: 15 plays, 75 yards, 7:50

Second quarter

- UNH – Ryan Blagg 6-yard pass from Matt Vezza (Nick Reed kick), 0:28. Wildcats 14-0. Drive: 16 plays, 91 yards, 8:06

Third quarter

- UNH – Matt Vezza 3-yard run (Nick Reed kick), 5:24. Wildcats 21-0. Drive: 12 plays, 97 yards, 7:08

Fourth quarter

- UNH – Nick Reed 47-yard field goal, 8:29. Wildcats 24-0. Drive: 4 plays, -14 yards, 2:08
- ALB – Alex Jreige 6-yard pass from Colin Parachek, 3:08. Wildcats 24-6. Drive: 14 plays, 86 yards, 5:16

Statistics	ALB	UNH
First downs	19	17
Plays–yards	66–275	64–308
Rushes–yards	24–94	40–118
Passing yards	181	190
Passing: Comp–Att–Int	21–42–1	19–24–0
Turnovers	1	0
Time of possession	25:40	34:20

Team	Category	Player	Statistics
Albany	Passing	Colin Parachek	21/42, 181 yards, TD, INT
Albany	Rushing	Colin Parachek	9 carries, 33 yards
Albany	Receiving	Kylen Austin	4 receptions, 56 yards
New Hampshire	Passing	Matt Vezza	19/24, 190 yards, TD
New Hampshire	Rushing	Myles Thomason	16 carries, 77 yards
New Hampshire	Receiving	Chase Wilson	4 receptions, 74 yards

=== Stony Brook (rivalry) ===
Stony Brook Seawolves (2-3) vs. Albany Great Danes (1-4) – Game summary

Quarter	1	2	3	4	Total
Seawolves	7	3	21	16	47
Great Danes	3	3	0	6	12

at Tom & Mary Casey Stadium • Albany, NY

- Date: October 4
- Game time: 3:30 PM EDT
- Game weather: Sunny • Temperature: 75 °F (24 °C) • Wind: N at 2 miles per hour (3.2 km/h)
- Game attendance: 6,051
- Referee: Todd Bowman
- TV announcers (FloFootball): Rodger Wyland (play-by-play) and Michael Johnson Jr. (analyst)

Game information

First Quarter

- (7:12) ALB – James Bozek 34-yard field goal (Drive: 6 plays, 48 yards, 1:54; Albany 3–0)
- (3:32) SBU – Roland Dempster 8-yard run, Enda Kirby kick (Drive: 7 plays, 70 yards, 3:34; Stony Brook 7–3)

Second Quarter

- (1:44) ALB – James Bozek 33-yard field goal (Drive: 7 plays, 38 yards, 2:51; Stony Brook 7–6)
- (0:09) SBU – Michael Mannino 46-yard field goal (Drive: 7 plays, 47 yards, 1:35; Stony Brook 10–6)

Third Quarter

- (13:14) SBU – Chris Zellous 28-yard run, Michael Mannino kick (Drive: 5 plays, 75 yards, 1:46; Stony Brook 17–6)
- (9:27) SBU – Chris Zellous 1-yard run, Michael Mannino kick (Drive: 7 plays, 54 yards, 2:57; Stony Brook 24–6)
- (1:35) SBU – Dez Williams 17-yard pass from Chris Zellous, Michael Mannino kick (Drive: 7 plays, 64 yards, 2:57; Stony Brook 31–6)

Fourth Quarter

- (13:13) SBU – Chris Zellous 1-yard run (Drive: 1 play, 1 yard, 0:05; Stony Brook 37–6)
- (11:57) ALB – Jasiah Barron 47-yard pass from Aidan Semo (Drive: 4 plays, 75 yards, 1:16; Stony Brook 37–12)
- (6:45) SBU – Michael Mannino 34-yard field goal (Drive: 8 plays, 38 yards, 5:12; Stony Brook 40–12)
- (2:07) SBU – Dylan Harris 3-yard run, Michael Mannino kick (Drive: 6 plays, 25 yards, 3:56; Stony Brook 47–12)

Statistics	STBK	ALB
First downs	28	10
Total yards	473	198
Rushing yards	223	50
Passing yards	250	148
Passing: Comp–Att–Int	21–31–0	8–23–1
Time of possession	36:50	23:10

Team	Category	Player	Statistics
Stony Brook	Passing	Chris Zellous	20/30, 241 yards, TD
Stony Brook	Rushing	Roland Dempster	20 carries, 105 yards, TD
Stony Brook	Receiving	Dez Williams	6 receptions, 87 yards, TD
Albany	Passing	Colin Parachek	5/18, 82 yards, INT
Albany	Rushing	Alex Jreige	4 carries, 13 yards
Albany	Receiving	Jasiah Barron	2 receptions, 64 yards, TD

=== No. 16 Rhode Island ===
No. 16 Rhode Island Rams (5–2) at Albany Great Danes (1–5) – Game summary

Quarter	1	2	3	4	Total
No. 16 Rams	10	21	7	20	58
Great Danes	0	3	14	0	17

at Tom & Mary Casey Stadium • Albany, NY

- Date: October 18
- Game time: 3:30 PM EDT
- Game weather: Cloudy • Temperature: 60 °F (16 °C) • Wind: N at 2 miles per hour (3.2 km/h)
- Game attendance: 6,158
- Referee: Anthony Florio
- TV announcers (FloFootball): Rodger Wyland (play-by-play) and Michael Johnson Jr. (analyst)

Game information

First quarter

- (10:21) URI – Garth White 48-yard field goal (Drive: 7 plays, -7 yards, 3:09; Rhode Island 3-0)
- (3:15) URI – Antwain Littleton Jr. 1-yard run, Garth White kick (Drive: 11 plays, 50 yards, 4:34; Rhode Island 10-0)

Second quarter

- (12:54) ALB – James Bozek 33-yard field goal (Drive: 13 plays, 59 yards, 5:21; Rhode Island 10-3)
- (10:37) URI – Greg Gaines III 32-yard pass from Devin Farrell, Garth White kick (Drive: 5 plays, 75 yards, 2:17; Rhode Island 17-3)
- (6:38) URI – Greg Gaines III 42-yard pass from Devin Farrell, Garth White kick (Drive: 4 plays, 82 yards, 1:32; Rhode Island 24-3)
- (0:49) URI – Connor Finer 4-yard pass from Devin Farrell, Garth White kick (Drive: 6 plays, 69 yards, 2:00; Rhode Island 31-3)

Third quarter

- (9:04) URI – Connor Finer 5-yard pass from Devin Farrell, Garth White kick (Drive: 11 plays, 75 yards, 5:56; Rhode Island 38-3)
- (6:05) ALB – Griffin Woodell 46-yard pass from Jack Shields, James Bozek kick (Drive: 5 plays, 74 yards, 2:55; Rhode Island 38-10)
- (2:42) ALB – Aidan Semo 2-yard run, James Bozek kick (Drive: 1 play, 2 yards, 0:00; Rhode Island 38-17)

Fourth quarter

- (13:12) URI – Terrence Campbell 2-yard run, Garth White kick (Drive: 4 plays, 39 yards, 1:38; Rhode Island 45-17)
- (3:26) URI – Will Dixon 2-yard pass from Conner Kenyon, Garth White PAT failed (Drive: 13 plays, 65 yards, 7:29; Rhode Island 51-17)
- (0:51) URI – Leisaan Hibbert 47-yard fumble return, Garth White kick (Drive: 5 plays, 22 yards, 2:35; Rhode Island 58-17)

Statistics	URI	ALB
First downs	23	19
Plays–yards	67–477	61–325
Rushes–yards	46–142	35–133
Passing yards	335	192
Passing: Comp–Att–Int	20-21-0	12-26-2
Turnovers	0	4
Time of possession	32:57	26:59

Team	Category	Player	Statistics
Rhode Island	Passing	Devin Farrell	19/20, 333 yards, 4 TD
Rhode Island	Rushing	Antwain Littleton Jr.	16 carries, 72 yards, TD
Rhode Island	Receiving	Greg Gaines III	6 receptions, 153 yards, 2 TD
Albany	Passing	Jack Shields	12/26, 192 yards, TD, 2 INT
Albany	Rushing	Griffin Woodell	5 carries, 62 yards
Albany	Receiving	Griffin Woodell	2 receptions, 50 yards, TD

=== at No. 11 Villanova ===
Albany Great Danes (1–6) at No. 11 Villanova Wildcats (5–2) – Game summary

Quarter	1	2	3	4	Total
Great Danes	7	0	0	9	16
No. 11 Wildcats	0	12	10	7	29

at Villanova Stadium • Villanova, PA

- Date: October 25
- Game time: 3:30 PM EDT
- Game weather: Sunny • Temperature: 60 °F (16 °C) • Wind: W at 6 miles per hour (9.7 km/h)
- Game attendance: 4,101
- Referee: Justin Ackley
- TV announcers (FloFootball): Nick Mantegna (play-by-play), Steve Pinone (analyst), and Tessa Peloso (sideline)

Game information

First quarter

- (9:23) ALB – Carter Moses 8-yard pass from Jack Shields, James Bozek kick (Drive: 8 plays, 46 yards, 4:40; Albany 7-0)

Second quarter

- (10:00) VILL – David Avit 5-yard run, Jack Barnum PAT blocked (Drive: 10 plays, 43 yards, 5:11; Albany 7-6)
- (7:57) VILL – Jack Barnum 41-yard field goal (Drive: 5 plays, 3 yards, 1:55; Villanova 9-7)
- (1:13) VILL – Jack Barnum 23-yard field goal (Drive: 11 plays, 57 yards, 5:56; Villanova 12-7)

Third quarter

- (8:21) VILL – Luke Colella 34-yard pass from Pat McQuaide, Jack Barnum kick (Drive: 3 plays, 52 yards, 1:24; Villanova 19-7)
- (4:21) VILL – Jack Barnum 44-yard field goal (Drive: 6 plays, 16 yards, 3:39; Villanova 22-7)

Fourth quarter

- (14:54) ALB – James Bozek 36-yard field goal (Drive: 12 plays, 63 yards, 4:20; Villanova 22-10)
- (10:38) VILL – Luke Colella 36-yard pass from Pat McQuaide, Jack Barnum kick (Drive: 1 play, 36 yards, 0:08; Villanova 29-10)
- (5:54) ALB – Aidan Semo 2-yard run, James Bozek PAT failed (Drive: 11 plays, 80 yards, 4:36; Villanova 29-16)

Statistics	ALB	VILL
First downs	13	17
Plays–yards	55–154	61–256
Rushes–yards	28–52	39–53
Passing yards	102	203
Passing: Comp–Att–Int	11-27-1	15-22-1
Turnovers	2	1
Time of possession	26:47	33:13

Team	Category	Player	Statistics
Albany	Passing	Jack Shields	11/26, 102 yards, TD, INT
Albany	Rushing	Griffin Woodell	8 carries, 32 yards
Albany	Receiving	Jordan Rae	2 receptions, 38 yards
Villanova	Passing	Pat McQuaide	15/22, 203 yards, 2 TD, INT
Villanova	Rushing	David Avit	20 carries, 80 yards, TD
Villanova	Receiving	Luke Colella	6 receptions, 107 yards, 2 TD

=== at William & Mary ===
Albany Great Danes (1-7) vs. William & Mary Tribe (4-4) – Game summary

Quarter	1	2	3	4	Total
Great Danes	0	0	0	7	7
Tribe	9	19	9	0	37

at Zable Stadium • Williamsburg, VA

- Date: November 1
- Game time: 3:30 PM EDT
- Game weather: Sunny • Temperature: 63 °F (17 °C)
- Game attendance: 9,775
- Referee: Henry Wimberg
- TV: FloFootball

Game information

First Quarter

- (9:01) W&M – Joey Tomasso 5-yard run, Keegan Shackford kick (Drive: 14 plays, 75 yards, 5:59; William & Mary 7-0)
- (1:05) W&M – Team safety (Drive: 3 plays, -6 yards, 1:29; William & Mary 9-0)

Second Quarter

- (12:08) W&M – Keegan Shackford 29-yard field goal (Drive: 12 plays, 38 yards, 3:57; William & Mary 12-0)
- (11:10) W&M – Team safety (Drive: 3 plays, -12 yards, 0:58; William & Mary 14-0)
- (3:17) W&M – Armon Wright 21-yard pass from Tyler Hughes, Keegan Shackford kick (Drive: 8 plays, 86 yards, 3:58; William & Mary 21-0)
- (1:41) W&M – Jackson Blee 16-yard pass from Damian Harris, Keegan Shackford kick (Drive: 5 plays, 47 yards, 1:27; William & Mary 28-0)

Third Quarter

- (6:45) W&M – Team safety (Drive: 3 plays, 4 yards, 1:31; William & Mary 30-0)
- (1:49) W&M – Rashad Raymond 2-yard run, Keegan Shackford kick (Drive: 9 plays, 70 yards, 4:56; William & Mary 37-0)

Fourth Quarter

- (11:07) ALB – Aidan Semo 2-yard run, James Bozek kick (Drive: 14 plays, 75 yards, 5:42; William & Mary 37-7)

Statistics	ALB	W&M
First downs	15	26
Total yards	232	442
Rushing yards	99	175
Passing yards	133	267
Passing: Comp–Att–Int	9-30-1	27-40-0
Time of possession	23:12	36:48

Team	Category	Player	Statistics
Albany	Passing	Jack Shields	9/30, 133 yards, INT
Albany	Rushing	Griffin Woodell	8 carries, 43 yards
Albany	Receiving	Jordan Rae	1 reception, 45 yards
William & Mary	Passing	Tyler Hughes	25/38, 245 yards, TD
William & Mary	Rushing	Rashad Raymond	14 carries, 76 yards, TD
William & Mary	Receiving	Jackson Blee	9 receptions, 78 yards, TD

=== Bryant ===
Bryant Bulldogs (2-7) vs. Albany Great Danes (1-8) – Game summary

Quarter	1	2	3	4	Total
Bulldogs	0	14	3	10	27
Great Danes	3	14	7	0	24

at Tom & Mary Casey Stadium • Albany, NY

- Date: November 8
- Game time: 1:00 PM EST
- Game weather: Sunny • Temperature: 54 °F (12 °C) • Wind: SE at 12 miles per hour (19 km/h)
- Game attendance: 2,547
- Referee: Antonio Marcella
- TV: FloFootball

Game information

First Quarter

- (8:54) ALB – James Bozek 25-yard field goal (Drive: 12 plays, 62 yards, 6:02; Albany 3-0)

Second Quarter

- (12:23) ALB – Steven Mahar Jr. 18-yard pass from Jack Shields, James Bozek kick (Drive: 3 plays, 32 yards, 1:16; Albany 10-0)
- (7:22) BRY – Elijah Elliott 7-yard run, Nicholas Stoyanovich kick (Drive: 9 plays, 69 yards, 4:56; Albany 10-7)
- (4:53) ALB – Carter Moses 33-yard pass from Jack Shields, James Bozek kick (Drive: 5 plays, 68 yards, 2:22; Albany 17-7)
- (4:47) BRY – Zyheem Collick 68-yard pass from Jaden Keefner, Nicholas Stoyanovich kick (Drive: 2 plays, 68 yards, 0:43; Albany 17-14)

Third Quarter

- (9:20) BRY – Nicholas Stoyanovich 21-yard field goal (Drive: 12 plays, 61 yards, 5:37; 17-17)
- (3:51) ALB – Aidan Semo 3-yard run, James Bozek kick (Drive: 7 plays, 32 yards, 3:43; Albany 24-17)

Fourth Quarter

- (9:51) BRY – Tristen Riley 6-yard pass from Ridge Docekal, Nicholas Stoyanovich kick (Drive: 11 plays, 40 yards, 4:59; 24-24)
- (5:43) BRY – Nicholas Stoyanovich 26-yard field goal (Drive: 4 plays, 8 yards, 2:21; Bryant 27-24)

Statistics	BRY	ALB
First downs	18	16
Total yards	351	321
Rushing yards	88	86
Passing yards	263	235
Passing: Comp–Att–Int	18-31-0	22-31-0
Time of possession	30:05	29:55

Team	Category	Player	Statistics
Bryant	Passing	Jaden Keefner	14/22, 224 yards, TD
Bryant	Rushing	Elijah Elliott	23 carries, 70 yards, TD
Bryant	Receiving	Zyheem Collick	3 receptions, 83 yards, TD
Albany	Passing	Jack Shields	22/31, 235 yards, 2 TD
Albany	Rushing	Griffin Woodell	12 carries, 50 yards
Albany	Receiving	Carter Moses	3 receptions, 46 yards, TD

=== Towson ===
Towson Tigers (0-0) vs. Albany Great Danes (0-0) – Game summary

Quarter	1	2	3	4	Total
Tigers	14	10	2	10	36
Great Danes	6	6	7	0	19

at Tom & Mary Casey Stadium • Albany, NY

- Date: November 15
- Game time: 12:00 PM EST
- Game weather: Cloudy • Temperature: 42 °F (6 °C) • Wind: N at 2 miles per hour (3.2 km/h)
- Game attendance: 2,207
- Referee: Todd Boyd
- TV: FloFootball

Game information

First Quarter

- (14:47) ALB – Lasalle Rose Jr. 50-yard pass from Jack Shields, James Bozek PAT failed (Drive: 1 play, 50 yards, 0:07; Albany 6-0)
- (12:08) TOW – Kemarrion Battles 11-yard run, Caden Williams kick (Drive: 7 plays, 82 yards, 2:34; Towson 7-6)
- (2:17) TOW – Kahseim Phillips 2-yard run, Caden Williams kick (Drive: 12 plays, 62 yards, 6:14; Towson 14-6)

Second Quarter

- (6:17) TOW – Caden Williams 31-yard field goal (Drive: 8 plays, 37 yards, 2:24; Towson 17-6)
- (3:45) TOW – John Dunmore 16-yard pass from Andrew Indorf, Caden Williams kick (Drive: 3 plays, 49 yards, 0:58; Towson 24-6)
- (0:20) ALB – Aidan Semo 3-yard run, James Bozek PAT failed (Drive: 5 plays, 60 yards, 2:07; Towson 24-12)

Third Quarter

- (11:43) TOW – Team safety (Towson 26-12)
- (3:36) ALB – Jojo Uga 6-yard run, Steven Sadek kick (Drive: 1 play, 6 yards, 0:05; Towson 26-19)

Fourth Quarter

- (12:01) TOW – Caden Williams 47-yard field goal (Drive: 4 plays, 7 yards, 1:30; Towson 29-19)
- (1:56) TOW – Winston Watkins 7-yard run, Caden Williams kick (Drive: 7 plays, 47 yards, 2:35; Towson 36-19)

Statistics	TOW	ALB
First downs	23	13
Total yards	339	249
Rushing yards	143	88
Passing yards	196	161
Passing: Comp–Att–Int	16-29-0	17-33-2
Time of possession	32:28	27:32

Team	Category	Player	Statistics
Towson	Passing	Andrew Indorf	16/28, 196 yards, TD
Towson	Rushing	Winston Watkins	8 carries, 53 yards, TD
Towson	Receiving	Sam Reynolds	3 receptions, 48 yards
Albany	Passing	Jack Shields	15/31, 154 yards, TD, 2 INT
Albany	Rushing	Jojo Uga	11 carries, 44 yards, TD
Albany	Receiving	Lasalle Rose Jr.	2 receptions, 64 yards, TD

=== at No. 12 Monmouth ===
Albany Great Danes (1-10) vs. No. 12 Monmouth Hawks (9-2) – Game summary

Quarter	1	2	3	4	Total
Great Danes	-	-	-	-	0
No. 12 Hawks	-	-	-	-	0

at Kessler Field • West Long Branch, NJ

- Date: November 22
- Game time: 12:00 PM EST

Statistics	ALB	MONM
First downs		
Total yards		
Rushing yards		
Passing yards		
Passing: Comp–Att–Int		
Time of possession		

Team	Category	Player	Statistics
Albany	Passing		
Albany	Rushing		
Albany	Receiving		
Monmouth	Passing		
Monmouth	Rushing		
Monmouth	Receiving		
