= 2025 William & Mary Tribe football team =

American college football season

2025 William & Mary Tribe football
- Conference: CAA Football
- Record: 7–5 (6–2 CAA)
- Head coach: Mike London (7th season)
- Offensive coordinator: Winston October (1st season)
- Co-defensive coordinators: Ras-I Dowling (3rd season); Bo Revell (3rd season)
- Home stadium: Zable Stadium

2025 Coastal Athletic Association Football Conference standings
| | Conf. | | | Overall |
| Team | W | | L | W | | L |
|---|---|---|---|---|---|---|
| No. 11 Rhode Island $^ | 8 | – | 0 | 11 | – | 3 |
| No. 4т Villanova ^ | 7 | – | 1 | 12 | – | 3 |
| No. 23 New Hampshire ^ | 6 | – | 2 | 8 | – | 5 |
| No. 22 Monmouth | 6 | – | 2 | 9 | – | 3 |
| William & Mary | 6 | – | 2 | 7 | – | 5 |
| Maine | 5 | – | 3 | 6 | – | 6 |
| Elon | 4 | – | 4 | 6 | – | 6 |
| Stony Brook | 4 | – | 4 | 6 | – | 6 |
| Towson | 4 | – | 4 | 6 | – | 6 |
| North Carolina A&T | 2 | – | 6 | 2 | – | 10 |
| Campbell | 2 | – | 6 | 2 | – | 10 |
| Bryant | 1 | – | 7 | 3 | – | 9 |
| Albany | 1 | – | 7 | 2 | – | 10 |
| Hampton | 0 | – | 8 | 2 | – | 10 |
$ – Conference champion; ^ – FCS playoff participant; Rankings from STATS Poll

The 2025 William & Mary Tribe football team represented the College of William & Mary as a member of the Coastal Athletic Association Football Conference (CAA) during the 2025 NCAA Division I FCS football season. The Tribe were led by seventh-year head coach Mike London and plays their home games at Zable Stadium. They finished the season with a 7–5 overall record (6–2 CAA) and tied for third place in CAA standings.

== Schedule ==
| Date | Time | Opponent | Site | TV | Result | Attendance |
|---|---|---|---|---|---|---|
| August 30 | 2:00 p.m. | at Furman* | Paladin Stadium; Greenville, SC | ESPN+ | L 21–23 | 8,347 |
| September 6 | 6:00 p.m. | Maine | Zable Stadium; Williamsburg, VA | FloSports | W 28–27 | 8,229 |
| September 13 | 12:00 p.m. | at Virginia* | Scott Stadium; Charlottesville, VA | ACCN | L 16–55 | 38,512 |
| September 20 | 4:00 p.m. | Charleston Southern* | Zable Stadium; Williamsburg, VA | FloSports | W 34–7 | 8,527 |
| September 27 | 3:30 p.m. | at No. 20 Villanova | Villanova Stadium; Villanova, PA | FloSports | L 24–31 | 6,493 |
| October 4 | 3:30 p.m. | North Carolina A&T | Zable Stadium; Williamsburg, VA | FloSports | W 38–34 | 12,783 |
| October 18 | 3:30 p.m. | Elon^{†} | Zable Stadium; Williamsburg, VA | FloSports | W 26–21 | 12,841 |
| October 25 | 1:00 p.m. | at New Hampshire | Wildcat Stadium; Durham, NH | FloSports | L 24–34 | 9,835 |
| November 1 | 3:30 p.m. | Albany | Zable Stadium; Williamsburg, VA | FloSports | W 37–7 | 9,775 |
| November 8 | 2:00 p.m. | at Campbell | Barker–Lane Stadium; Buies Creek, NC | FloSports | W 30–27 ^{OT} | 3,309 |
| November 15 | 1:00 p.m. | at Hampton | Armstrong Stadium; Hampton, VA | FloSports | W 55–14 | 2,401 |
| November 22 | 1:00 p.m. | Richmond* | Zable Stadium; Williamsburg, VA (Capital Cup) | FloSports | L 21–28 | 10,894 |
*Non-conference game; ^{†}Homecoming; Rankings from STATS Poll released prior to the game; All times are in Eastern time

== Game summaries ==
=== at Furman ===
William & Mary Tribe (0-0) vs. Furman Paladins (0-0) – Game summary

| Quarter | 1 | 2 | 3 | 4 | Total |
|---|---|---|---|---|---|
| Tribe | 0 | 7 | 14 | 0 | 21 |
| Paladins | 7 | 7 | 3 | 6 | 23 |

at Paladin Stadium • Greenville, SC

- Date: August 30
- Game time: 2:00 p.m. EDT
- TV: ESPN+

=== Maine ===
Maine Black Bears (0-1) vs. William & Mary Tribe (0-1) – Game summary

| Quarter | 1 | 2 | 3 | 4 | Total |
|---|---|---|---|---|---|
| Black Bears | 7 | 10 | 7 | 3 | 27 |
| Tribe | 0 | 7 | 14 | 7 | 28 |

at Zable Stadium • Williamsburg, VA

- Date: September 6
- Game time: 6:00 PM EDT
- Game weather: Rain • Temperature: 80 °F (27 °C)
- Game attendance: 8,231
- Referee: Justin Ackley
- TV: FloSports

Game information

First quarter

- (2:15) ME – Sincere Baines 1-yard pass from Carter Peevy, Samuel Tremblay kick (Drive: 15 plays, 66 yards, 6:53; Maine 7–0)

Second quarter

- (9:30) ME – Carter Peevy 45-yard run, Samuel Tremblay kick (Drive: 4 plays, 54 yards, 2:05; Maine 14–0)
- (7:02) W&M – Deven Thompson 23-yard pass from Tyler Hughes, Keegan Shackford kick (Drive: 5 plays, 70 yards, 2:28; Maine 14–7)
- (1:46) ME – Samuel Tremblay 27-yard field goal (Drive: 13 plays, 55 yards, 5:16; Maine 17–7)

Third quarter

- (11:44) W&M – Sean McElwain 6-yard pass from Tyler Hughes, Keegan Shackford kick (Drive: 3 plays, 17 yards, 0:58; Maine 17–14)
- (8:04) W&M – Josh Miller 2-yard run, Keegan Shackford kick (Drive: 8 plays, 55 yards, 2:43; William & Mary 21–17)
- (1:18) ME – Scott Woods 2-yard pass from Carter Peevy, Samuel Tremblay kick (Drive: 13 plays, 75 yards, 6:46; Maine 24–21)

Fourth quarter

- (7:09) ME – Samuel Tremblay 22-yard field goal (Drive: 11 plays, 56 yards, 5:07; Maine 27–21)
- (3:11) W&M – Rashad Raymond 1-yard run, Keegan Shackford kick (Drive: 7 plays, 65 yards, 3:58; William & Mary 28–27)

| Statistics | ME | W&M |
|---|---|---|
| First downs | 21 | 19 |
| Total yards | 323 | 253 |
| Rushing yards | 226 | 124 |
| Passing yards | 97 | 129 |
| Passing: Comp–Att–Int | 13–27–1 | 13–20–0 |
| Time of possession | 31:51 | 27:08 |

| Team | Category | Player | Statistics |
|---|---|---|---|
| Maine | Passing | Carter Peevy | 13/27, 97 yards, 2 TD, INT |
| Maine | Rushing | Carter Peevy | 12 carries, 98 yards, TD |
| Maine | Receiving | Scott Woods II | 6 receptions, 48 yards, TD |
| William & Mary | Passing | Tyler Hughes | 13/19, 129 yards, 2 TD |
| William & Mary | Rushing | Tyler Hughes | 10 carries, 73 yards |
| William & Mary | Receiving | Garrett Robertson | 3 receptions, 35 yards |

=== at Virginia (FBS) ===
William & Mary Tribe (1-1) at Virginia Cavaliers (FBS) (1-1) – Game summary

| Quarter | 1 | 2 | 3 | 4 | Total |
|---|---|---|---|---|---|
| Tribe | 0 | 7 | 7 | 2 | 16 |
| Cavaliers (FBS) | 14 | 28 | 10 | 3 | 55 |

at Scott Stadium • Charlottesville, VA

- Date: September 13
- Game time: 12:00 PM EDT
- Game attendance: 38,512
- Referee: Garrett Dickerson
- TV announcers (ACCN): Matt Schumacker (play-by-play), Dustin Fox (analyst) and Ashley Stroehlein (sideline)

Game information

First quarter

- UVA – Kameron Courtney 23-yard run (Will Bettridge kick), 10:46. Cavaliers 7–0. Drive: 10 plays, 75 yards, 4:14.
- UVA – J'Mari Taylor 1-yard run (Will Bettridge kick), 5:23. Cavaliers 14–0. Drive: 10 plays, 79 yards, 3:10.

Second quarter

- UVA – Xavier Brown 4-yard run (Will Bettridge kick), 13:18. Cavaliers 21–0. Drive: 8 plays, 78 yards, 2:57.
- W&M – Deven Thompson 79-yard pass from Tyler Hughes (Keegan Shackford kick), 13:01. Cavaliers 21–7. Drive: 1 play, 79 yards, 0:11.
- UVA – Harrison Waylee 2-yard run (Will Bettridge kick), 9:27. Cavaliers 28–7. Drive: 7 plays, 73 yards, 3:22.
- UVA – John Rogers 3-yard pass from Chandler Morris (Will Bettridge kick), 6:01. Cavaliers 35–7. Drive: 5 plays, 34 yards, 1:48.
- UVA – Harrison Waylee 8-yard run (Will Bettridge kick), 1:59. Cavaliers 42–7. Drive: 5 plays, 80 yards, 1:59.

Third quarter

- UVA – Harrison Waylee 97-yard run (Will Bettridge kick), 11:31. Cavaliers 49–7. Drive: 1 play, 97 yards, 0:15.
- UVA – Will Bettridge 24-yard field goal, 6:46. Cavaliers 52–7. Drive: 9 plays, 71 yards, 3:15.
- W&M – Noah Brannock 6-yard run (Keegan Shackford kick), 2:13. Cavaliers 52–14. Drive: 5 plays, 53 yards, 1:21.

Fourth quarter

- UVA – Will Bettridge 31-yard field goal, 12:58. Cavaliers 55–14. Drive: 8 plays, 38 yards, 4:08.
- W&M – Team Safety, 7:59. Cavaliers 55–16.

| Statistics | W&M | UVA |
|---|---|---|
| First downs | 7 | 30 |
| Plays–yards | 79–263 | 87–700 |
| Rushes–yards | 24–59 | 52–379 |
| Passing yards | 204 | 321 |
| Passing: comp–att–int | 13–25–0 | 23–35–1 |
| Turnovers | 0 | 1 |
| Time of possession | 22:24 | 37:36 |

| Team | Category | Player | Statistics |
|---|---|---|---|
| William & Mary | Passing | Noah Brannock | 8/17, 111 yards |
| William & Mary | Rushing | Noah Brannock | 9 carries, 35 yards, TD |
| William & Mary | Receiving | Deven Thompson | 5 receptions, 108 yards, TD |
| Virginia | Passing | Daniel Kaelin | 8/14, 164 yards, INT |
| Virginia | Rushing | Harrison Waylee | 10 carries, 151 yards, 3 TD |
| Virginia | Receiving | Kameron Courtney | 4 receptions, 67 yards |

=== Charleston Southern ===
Charleston Southern Buccaneers (0-3) vs. William & Mary Tribe (1-2) – Game summary

| Quarter | 1 | 2 | 3 | 4 | Total |
|---|---|---|---|---|---|
| Buccaneers | 0 | 7 | 0 | 0 | 7 |
| Tribe | 7 | 7 | 13 | 7 | 34 |

at Zable Stadium • Williamsburg, VA

- Date: September 20
- Game time: 4:00 PM EDT
- Game weather: Cloudy • Temperature: 81 °F (27 °C)
- Game attendance: 8,527
- Referee: Tom Zetts
- TV announcers (FloSports): Jay Colley (play-by-play) and Sean McDermott (analyst)

=== at No. 20 Villanova ===
William & Mary Tribe (2–2) at No. 20 Villanova Wildcats (1–2) – Game summary

| Quarter | 1 | 2 | 3 | 4 | Total |
|---|---|---|---|---|---|
| Tribe | 7 | 10 | 0 | 7 | 24 |
| No. 20 Wildcats | 7 | 7 | 10 | 7 | 31 |

at Villanova Stadium • Villanova, PA

- Date: September 27
- Game time: 3:30 PM EDT
- Game weather: Sunny • Temperature: 77 °F (25 °C) • Wind: E at 6 miles per hour (9.7 km/h)
- Game attendance: 6,493
- Referee: Alex Parrella
- TV announcers (FloSports): Ben Curtis (play-by-play), Steve Pinone (analyst) and Tessa Peloso (sideline)

Game information

First quarter

- VILL – David Avit 1-yard run (Jack Barnum kick), 7:22. Wildcats 7–0. Drive: 10 plays, 92 yards, 4:31.
- W&M – Tariq Sims 10-yard pass from Tyler Hughes (Keegan Shackford kick), 3:08. Tied 7–7. Drive: 8 plays, 75 yards, 4:07.

Second quarter

- W&M – Tyler Hughes 1-yard run (Keegan Shackford kick), 11:03. Tribe 14–7. Drive: 13 plays, 72 yards, 5:42.
- VILL – David Avit 15-yard run (Jack Barnum kick), 4:01. Tied 14–14. Drive: 6 plays, 54 yards, 2:49.
- W&M – Keegan Shackford 37-yard field goal, 1:41. Tribe 17–14. Drive: 9 plays, 55 yards, 2:20.

Third quarter

- VILL – Ja'briel Mace 100-yard kickoff return (Jack Barnum kick), 14:48. Wildcats 21–17.
- VILL – Jack Barnum 43-yard field goal, 8:04. Wildcats 24–17. Drive: 11 plays, 43 yards, 5:24.

Fourth quarter

- VILL – David Avit 3-yard run (Jack Barnum kick), 10:18. Wildcats 31–17. Drive: 13 plays, 75 yards, 7:52.
- W&M – Tyler Hughes 1-yard run (Keegan Shackford kick), 4:38. Wildcats 31–24. Drive: 14 plays, 75 yards, 5:40.

| Statistics | W&M | VILL |
|---|---|---|
| First downs | 23 | 24 |
| Plays–yards | 75–356 | 64–426 |
| Rushes–yards | 39–123 | 36–232 |
| Passing yards | 233 | 194 |
| Passing: Comp–Att–Int | 18-36-0 | 15-28-0 |
| Turnovers | 0 | 0 |
| Time of possession | 30:26 | 29:34 |

| Team | Category | Player | Statistics |
|---|---|---|---|
| William & Mary | Passing | Tyler Hughes | 18/35, 233 yards, TD |
| William & Mary | Rushing | Tyler Hughes | 18 carries, 63 yards, 2 TD |
| William & Mary | Receiving | Isaiah Lemmond | 4 receptions, 67 yards |
| Villanova | Passing | Pat McQuaide | 15/28, 194 yards |
| Villanova | Rushing | David Avit | 17 carries, 133 yards, 3 TD |
| Villanova | Receiving | Luke Colella | 6 receptions, 88 yards |

=== North Carolina A&T ===
North Carolina A&T Aggies (1-4) vs. William & Mary Tribe (2-3) – Game summary

| Quarter | 1 | 2 | 3 | 4 | Total |
|---|---|---|---|---|---|
| Aggies | 7 | 17 | 10 | 0 | 34 |
| Tribe | 7 | 7 | 17 | 7 | 38 |

at Zable Stadium • Williamsburg, VA

- Date: October 4
- Game time: 3:30 PM EDT
- TV: FloSports

=== Elon ===
Elon Phoenix (4-3) vs. William & Mary Tribe (3-3) – Game summary

| Quarter | 1 | 2 | 3 | 4 | Total |
|---|---|---|---|---|---|
| Phoenix | 7 | 7 | 0 | 7 | 21 |
| Tribe | 0 | 10 | 16 | 0 | 26 |

at Zable Stadium • Williamsburg, VA

- Date: October 18
- Game time: 3:30 PM EDT

=== at New Hampshire ===
William & Mary Tribe (4-3) vs. New Hampshire Wildcats (4-4) – Game summary

| Quarter | 1 | 2 | 3 | 4 | Total |
|---|---|---|---|---|---|
| Tribe | 7 | 7 | 7 | 3 | 24 |
| Wildcats | 14 | 3 | 14 | 3 | 34 |

at Wildcat Stadium • Durham, NH

- Date: October 25
- Game time: 1:00 PM EDT

=== Albany ===
Albany Great Danes (1-7) vs. William & Mary Tribe (4-4) – Game summary

| Quarter | 1 | 2 | 3 | 4 | Total |
|---|---|---|---|---|---|
| Great Danes | 0 | 0 | 0 | 7 | 7 |
| Tribe | 9 | 19 | 9 | 0 | 37 |

at Zable Stadium • Williamsburg, VA

- Date: November 1
- Game time: 3:30 PM EDT
- Game weather: Sunny • Temperature: 63 °F (17 °C)
- Game attendance: 9,775
- Referee: Henry Wimberg
- TV: FloFootball

Game information

First Quarter

- (9:01) W&M – Joey Tomasso 5-yard run, Keegan Shackford kick (Drive: 14 plays, 75 yards, 5:59; William & Mary 7-0)
- (1:05) W&M – Team safety (Drive: 3 plays, -6 yards, 1:29; William & Mary 9-0)

Second Quarter

- (12:08) W&M – Keegan Shackford 29-yard field goal (Drive: 12 plays, 38 yards, 3:57; William & Mary 12-0)
- (11:10) W&M – Team safety (Drive: 3 plays, -12 yards, 0:58; William & Mary 14-0)
- (3:17) W&M – Armon Wright 21-yard pass from Tyler Hughes, Keegan Shackford kick (Drive: 8 plays, 86 yards, 3:58; William & Mary 21-0)
- (1:41) W&M – Jackson Blee 16-yard pass from Damian Harris, Keegan Shackford kick (Drive: 5 plays, 47 yards, 1:27; William & Mary 28-0)

Third Quarter

- (6:45) W&M – Team safety (Drive: 3 plays, 4 yards, 1:31; William & Mary 30-0)
- (1:49) W&M – Rashad Raymond 2-yard run, Keegan Shackford kick (Drive: 9 plays, 70 yards, 4:56; William & Mary 37-0)

Fourth Quarter

- (11:07) ALB – Aidan Semo 2-yard run, James Bozek kick (Drive: 14 plays, 75 yards, 5:42; William & Mary 37-7)

| Statistics | ALB | W&M |
|---|---|---|
| First downs | 15 | 26 |
| Total yards | 232 | 442 |
| Rushing yards | 99 | 175 |
| Passing yards | 133 | 267 |
| Passing: Comp–Att–Int | 9-30-1 | 27-40-0 |
| Time of possession | 23:12 | 36:48 |

| Team | Category | Player | Statistics |
|---|---|---|---|
| Albany | Passing | Jack Shields | 9/30, 133 yards, INT |
| Albany | Rushing | Griffin Woodell | 8 carries, 43 yards |
| Albany | Receiving | Jordan Rae | 1 reception, 45 yards |
| William & Mary | Passing | Tyler Hughes | 25/38, 245 yards, TD |
| William & Mary | Rushing | Rashad Raymond | 14 carries, 76 yards, TD |
| William & Mary | Receiving | Jackson Blee | 9 receptions, 78 yards, TD |

=== at Campbell ===
William & Mary Tribe (5-4) vs. Campbell Fighting Camels (2-7) – Game summary

| Quarter | 1 | 2 | 3 | 4 | OT | Total |
|---|---|---|---|---|---|---|
| Tribe | 3 | 10 | 0 | 11 | 6 | 30 |
| Fighting Camels | 7 | 10 | 7 | 0 | 3 | 27 |

at Barker–Lane Stadium • Buies Creek, NC

- Date: November 8
- Game time: 2:00 PM EST

=== at Hampton ===
William & Mary Tribe (6-4) vs. Hampton Pirates (2-8) – Game summary

| Quarter | 1 | 2 | 3 | 4 | Total |
|---|---|---|---|---|---|
| Tribe | 14 | 24 | 17 | 0 | 55 |
| Pirates | 14 | 0 | 0 | 0 | 14 |

at Armstrong Stadium • Hampton, VA

- Date: November 15
- Game time: 1:00 PM EST

=== Richmond (Capital Cup) ===
Richmond Spiders (6-5) vs. William & Mary Tribe (7-4) – Game summary

| Quarter | 1 | 2 | 3 | 4 | Total |
|---|---|---|---|---|---|
| Spiders | 0 | 0 | 21 | 7 | 28 |
| Tribe | 7 | 7 | 0 | 7 | 21 |

at Zable Stadium • Williamsburg, VA

- Date: November 22
- Game time: 1:00 PM EST
- Game weather: Rain • Temperature: 64 °F (18 °C)
- Game attendance: 10,894
- Referee: Justin Ackley
- TV announcers (FloSports/MASN): Jay Colley (play-by-play) and Shawn Knight (analyst)

Game information

First Quarter

- (11:27) W&M - Tyler Hughes 3-yard run, Keegan Shackford kick (Drive: 6 Plays, 47 yards, 2:00; W&M 7–0)

Second Quarter

- (9:33) W&M - Rashad Raymond 3-yard run, Keegan Shackford kick (Drive: 6 Plays, 52 yards, 3:16; W&M 14–0)

Third Quarter

- (10:01) RICH - Kyle Wickersham 11-yard pass to Ja'Vion Griffin, Jayden Alsheskie kick (Drive: 10 Plays, 55 yards, 4:59; W&M 14–7)
- (4:57) RICH - Kyle Wickersham 6-yard pass to Quanye Veney, Jayden Alsheskie kick (Drive: 9 Plays, 70 yards, 4:02; TIED 14–14)
- (2:14) RICH - Kyle Wickersham 15-yard run, Jayden Alsheskie kick (Drive: 2 Plays, 40 yards, 0:42; RICH 21–14)

Fourth Quarter

- (11:11) W&M - Tyler Hughes 7-yard run, Keegan Shackford kick (Drive: 6 Plays, 69 yards, 2:47; TIED 21–21)
- (1:56) RICH - Ashten Snelsire 14-yard run, Jayden Alsheskie kick (Drive: 13 Plays, 91 yards, 6:19; RICH 28–21)

| Statistics | RICH | W&M |
|---|---|---|
| First downs | 18 | 12 |
| Total yards | 323 | 194 |
| Rushing yards | 151 | 108 |
| Passing yards | 172 | 86 |
| Passing: Comp–Att–Int | 15–24–0 | 15–24–1 |
| Time of possession | 31:21 | 28:39 |

| Team | Category | Player | Statistics |
|---|---|---|---|
| Richmond | Passing | Kyle Wickersham | 12–18, 128 yards, 2 TD |
| Richmond | Rushing | Kyle Wickersham | 16 carries, 73 yards, 1 TD |
| Richmond | Receiving | Ja'Vion Griffin | 9 receptions, 93 yards, 1 TD |
| William & Mary | Passing | Tyler Hughes | 15–24, 86 yards |
| William & Mary | Rushing | Rashad Raymond | 13 carries, 58 yards, 1 TD |
| William & Mary | Receiving | Isaiah Lemmond | 3 receptions, 30 yards |
