= 2025 Stony Brook Seawolves football team =

American college football season

2025 Stony Brook Seawolves football
- Conference: CAA Football
- Record: 6–6 (4–4 CAA)
- Head coach: Billy Cosh (2nd season)
- Offensive coordinator: Anthony Davis (2nd season)
- Defensive coordinator: Scott Lewis (2nd season)
- Home stadium: Kenneth P. LaValle Stadium

2025 Coastal Athletic Association Football Conference standings
	Conf.			Overall
Team	W		L	W		L
No. 11 Rhode Island $^	8	–	0	11	–	3
No. 4т Villanova ^	7	–	1	12	–	3
No. 23 New Hampshire ^	6	–	2	8	–	5
No. 22 Monmouth	6	–	2	9	–	3
William & Mary	6	–	2	7	–	5
Maine	5	–	3	6	–	6
Elon	4	–	4	6	–	6
Stony Brook	4	–	4	6	–	6
Towson	4	–	4	6	–	6
North Carolina A&T	2	–	6	2	–	10
Campbell	2	–	6	2	–	10
Bryant	1	–	7	3	–	9
Albany	1	–	7	2	–	10
Hampton	0	–	8	2	–	10
$ – Conference champion; ^ – FCS playoff participant; Rankings from STATS Poll

The 2025 Stony Brook Seawolves football team represented Stony Brook University as a member of the Coastal Athletic Association Football Conference (CAA) during the 2025 NCAA Division I FCS football season. The Seawolves were led by second-year head coach Billy Cosh. Stony Brook played their home games at Kenneth P. LaValle Stadium, located in Stony Brook, New York.

== Schedule ==
Date	Time	Opponent	Rank	Site	TV	Result	Attendance
August 28	10:00 p.m.	at San Diego State*	No. 24	Snapdragon Stadium; San Diego, CA	MW Network	L 0–42	20,624
September 6	6:00 p.m.	No. 9 Rhode Island		Kenneth P. LaValle Stadium; Stony Brook, NY	FloSports	L 17–31	5,539
September 13	3:30 p.m.	Fordham*		Kenneth P. LaValle Stadium; Stony Brook, NY	FloSports	W 41–18	5,769
September 20	7:00 p.m.	at Lindenwood*		Harlen C. Hunter Stadium; St. Charles, MO	ESPN+	L 27–30	4,716
September 27	3:30 p.m.	Merrimack*		Kenneth P. LaValle Stadium; Stony Brook, NY	FloSports	W 35–10	3,596
October 4	3:30 p.m.	at Albany		Bob Ford Field; Albany, NY (rivalry)	FloSports	W 47–12	6,051
October 18	1:00 p.m.	at No. 11 Monmouth		Kessler Stadium; West Long Branch, NJ	FloSports	L 21–49	3,198
October 25	3:30 p.m.	Towson^{†}		Kenneth P. LaValle Stadium; Stony Brook, NY	FloSports	W 27–19	6,701
November 1	1:00 p.m.	at Maine		Alfond Sports Stadium; Orono, ME	FloSports	L 21–28	3,325
November 8	12:00 p.m.	North Carolina A&T		Kenneth P. LaValle Stadium; Stony Brook, NY	FloSports	W 38–12	4,117
November 15	1:00 p.m.	at No. 10 Villanova		Villanova Stadium; Villanova, PA	FloSports	L 27–30 ^{OT}	3,111
November 22	12:00 p.m.	Bryant		Kenneth P. LaValle Stadium; Stony Brook, NY	FloSports	W 35–28	3,027
*Non-conference game; ^{†}Homecoming; Rankings from STATS Poll released prior to the game; All times are in Eastern time

== Game summaries ==
=== at San Diego State (FBS) ===
No. 24 Stony Brook Seawolves (0–0) at San Diego State Aztecs (FBS) (0–0) – Game summary

Quarter	1	2	3	4	Total
No. 24 Seawolves	0	0	0	0	0
Aztecs (FBS)	14	6	8	14	42

at Snapdragon Stadium • San Diego, California

- Date: August 28, 2025
- Game time: 7:00 p.m. PDT
- Game weather: Cloudy, 81 °F (27 °C), wind N 3 mph (4.8 km/h)
- Game attendance: 20,624
- Referee: Kenneth Ray
- TV announcers (MW Network): Steve Quis (play-by-play) and J. R. Tolver (analyst)

Game information

First quarter

- SDSU – Lucky Sutton 1-yard run (Gabriel Plascencia kick), 5:30. Aztecs 7–0. Drive: 14 plays, 75 yards, 9:30.
- SDSU – Jacob Bostick 25-yard pass from Jayden Denegal (Gabriel Plascencia kick), 0:37. Aztecs 14–0. Drive: 13 plays, 78 yards, 1:11.

Second quarter

- SDSU – Gabriel Plascencia 42-yard field goal, 8:31. Aztecs 17–0. Drive: 5 plays, 45 yards, 1:35.
- SDSU – Gabriel Plascencia 35-yard field goal, 1:09. Aztecs 20–0. Drive: 13 plays, 61 yards, 4:42.

Third quarter

- SDSU – Lucky Sutton 2-yard run (DJ Herman pass to Brady Anderson), 1:40. Aztecs 28–0. Drive: 5 plays, 54 yards, 1:33.

Fourth quarter

- SDSU – Christian Washington 1-yard run (Gabriel Plascencia kick), 11:06. Aztecs 35–0. Drive: 9 plays, 61 yards, 3:54.
- SDSU – Parker Threatt 5-yard run (Nick Clegg kick), 1:54. Aztecs 42–0. Drive: 8 plays, 44 yards, 3:58.

Statistics	STBK	SDSU
First downs	6	24
Plays–yards	53–95	83–464
Rushes–yards	28–49	54–228
Passing yards	46	236
Passing: Comp–Att–Int	9–25–0	16–29–0
Turnovers	0	0
Time of possession	23:55	36:05

Team	Category	Player	Statistics
Stony Brook	Passing	Casey Case	4/10, 25 yards
Stony Brook	Rushing	Roland Dempster	12 carries, 49 yards
Stony Brook	Receiving	Dez Williams	3 receptions, 26 yards
San Diego State	Passing	Jayden Denegal	13/25, 208 yards, TD
San Diego State	Rushing	Lucky Sutton	22 carries, 100 yards, 2 TD
San Diego State	Receiving	Jacob Bostick	3 receptions, 56 yards, TD

=== No. 9 Rhode Island ===
No. 9 Rhode Island Rams (1–0) at Stony Brook Seawolves (0–1) – Game summary

Quarter	1	2	3	4	Total
No. 9 Rams	0	24	0	7	31
Seawolves	10	0	0	7	17

at Kenneth P. LaValle Stadium • Stony Brook, NY

- Date: September 6
- Game time: 6:00 PM EDT
- Game attendance: 5,539
- Referee: Jeff Pumphrey
- TV: FloSports

Game information

First quarter

- STBK – Enda Kirby 22-yard field goal, 6:02. Seawolves 3–0. Drive: 8 plays, 78 yards, 3:44.
- STBK – Roland Dempster 1-yard run (Enda Kirby kick), 2:58. Seawolves 10–0. Drive: 7 plays, 29 yards, 2:56.

Second quarter

- URI – Marquis Bunchanan 12-yard pass from Devin Farrell (Garth White kick), 9:14. Seawolves 10–7. Drive: 6 plays, 78 yards, 3:01.
- URI – Leisaan Hibbert 30-yard interception return (Garth White kick), 8:28. Rams 14–10.
- URI – Garth White 35-yard field goal, 3:32. Rams 17–10. Drive: 8 plays, 55 yards, 3:47.
- URI – Antwain Littleton Jr. 1-yard pass from Devin Farrell (Garth White kick), 0:07. Rams 24–10. Drive: 8 plays, 84 yards, 0:52.

Third quarter

- No scoring plays.

Fourth quarter

- STBK – Chris Zellous 3-yard run (Michael Mannino kick), 11:28. Rams 24–17. Drive: 12 plays, 82 yards, 4:54.
- URI – Antwain Littleton Jr. 15-yard run (Garth White kick), 2:09. Rams 31–17. Drive: 4 plays, 70 yards, 1:01.

Statistics	URI	STBK
First downs	22	18
Plays–yards	64–457	78–403
Rushes–yards	30–141	58–266
Passing yards	316	137
Passing: Comp–Att–Int	20–34–0	12–20–1
Turnovers	1	2
Time of possession	27:33	32:27

Team	Category	Player	Statistics
Rhode Island	Passing	Devin Farrell	20/34, 316 yards, 2 TD
Rhode Island	Rushing	Antwain Littleton Jr.	21 carries, 122 yards, TD
Rhode Island	Receiving	Aboraa Kwarteng	4 receptions, 114 yards
Stony Brook	Passing	Chris Zellous	12/20, 137 yards, INT
Stony Brook	Rushing	Roland Dempster	28 carries, 167 yards, TD
Stony Brook	Receiving	Cole Bunicci	2 receptions, 55 yards

=== Fordham ===
Fordham Rams (0-2) at Stony Brook Seawolves (0-2) – Game summary

Quarter	1	2	3	4	Total
Rams	0	0	10	8	18
Seawolves	3	10	14	14	41

at Kenneth P. LaValle Stadium • Stony Brook, NY

- Date: September 13
- Game time: 3:30 PM EDT
- Game attendance: 5,769
- Referee: Antonio Marcella
- TV announcers (FloSports): Jonny Wincott (play-by-play), Brandon London (analyst) and Johnny Gadamowitz (sideline)

Game information

First quarter

- STBK – Enda Kirby 26-yard field goal, 11:37. Seawolves 3–0. Drive: 10 plays, 57 yards, 3:23.

Second quarter

- STBK – Chris Zellous 8-yard run (Enda Kirby kick), 12:49. Seawolves 10–0. Drive: 1 play, 8 yards, 0:05.
- STBK – Michael Mannino 49-yard field goal, 2:33. Seawolves 13–0. Drive: 5 plays, 14 yards, 1:22.

Third quarter

- FOR – Bennett Henderson 24-yard field goal, 8:42. Seawolves 13–3. Drive: 9 plays, 25 yards, 3:16.
- FOR – Troy Worrell 35-yard pass from Gunnar Smith (Bennett Henderson kick), 8:19. Seawolves 13–10. Drive: 1 play, 35 yards, 0:16.
- STBK – MarQeese Dietz 93-yard pass from Chris Zellous (Enda Kirby kick), 7:29. Seawolves 20–10. Drive: 2 plays, 90 yards, 0:45.
- STBK – Jayce Freeman 19-yard pass from Chris Zellous (Enda Kirby kick), 2:47. Seawolves 27–10. Drive: 9 plays, 74 yards, 3:44.

Fourth quarter

- STBK – Jayce Freeman 15-yard pass from Chris Zellous (Enda Kirby kick), 9:34. Seawolves 34–10. Drive: 5 plays, 39 yards, 2:07.
- STBK – DaMario Crawford 52-yard interception return (Enda Kirby kick), 8:26. Seawolves 41–10.
- FOR – Jacob Rodriguez 1-yard run (Gunnar Smith–Jacob Rodriguez pass), 2:45. Seawolves 41–18. Drive: 15 plays, 78 yards, 5:31.

Statistics	FOR	STBK
First downs	15	20
Total yards	287	441
Rushes–yards	44–124	38–181
Passing yards	163	260
Passing: Comp–Att–Int	16–33–2	21–28–1
Turnovers	3	2
Time of possession	32:52	27:08

Team	Category	Player	Statistics
Fordham	Passing	Gunnar Smith	16/33, 163 yards, TD, 2 INT
Fordham	Rushing	Jamell James	10 carries, 45 yards
Fordham	Receiving	Jack Freeburg	4 receptions, 54 yards
Stony Brook	Passing	Chris Zellous	21/28, 260 yards, 3 TD, INT
Stony Brook	Rushing	Roland Dempster	18 carries, 94 yards
Stony Brook	Receiving	MarQeese Dietz	6 receptions, 120 yards, TD

=== at Lindenwood ===
Stony Brook Seawolves (1-2) at Lindenwood Lions (1-2) – Game summary

Quarter	1	2	3	4	Total
Seawolves	-	-	-	-	0
Lions	-	-	-	-	0

at Harlen C. Hunter Stadium • St. Charles, MO

- Date: September 20
- Game time: 6:00 PM CDT
- TV announcers (ESPN+): Bob Ramsey (play-by-play) and Zach Zook (analyst)

Statistics	STBK	LIN
First downs		
Total yards		
Rushing yards		
Passing yards		
Passing: Comp–Att–Int		
Time of possession		

Team	Category	Player	Statistics
Stony Brook	Passing		
Stony Brook	Rushing		
Stony Brook	Receiving		
Lindenwood	Passing		
Lindenwood	Rushing		
Lindenwood	Receiving		

=== Merrimack ===
Merrimack Warriors (2-2) vs. Stony Brook Seawolves (1-3) – Game summary

Quarter	1	2	3	4	Total
Warriors	0	7	3	0	10
Seawolves	10	10	8	7	35

at Kenneth P. LaValle Stadium • Stony Brook, NY

- Date: September 27
- Game time: 3:30 PM EDT

Statistics	MRMK	STBK
First downs		
Total yards		
Rushing yards		
Passing yards		
Passing: Comp–Att–Int		
Time of possession		

Team	Category	Player	Statistics
Merrimack	Passing		
Merrimack	Rushing		
Merrimack	Receiving		
Stony Brook	Passing		
Stony Brook	Rushing		
Stony Brook	Receiving		

=== at Albany (rivalry) ===
Stony Brook Seawolves (2-3) vs. Albany Great Danes (1-4) – Game summary

Quarter	1	2	3	4	Total
Seawolves	7	3	21	16	47
Great Danes	3	3	0	6	12

at Tom & Mary Casey Stadium • Albany, NY

- Date: October 4
- Game time: 3:30 PM EDT
- Game weather: Sunny • Temperature: 75 °F (24 °C) • Wind: N at 2 miles per hour (3.2 km/h)
- Game attendance: 6,051
- Referee: Todd Bowman
- TV announcers (FloSports): Rodger Wyland (play-by-play) and Michael Johnson Jr. (analyst)

Game information

First Quarter

- (7:12) ALB – James Bozek 34-yard field goal (Drive: 6 plays, 48 yards, 1:54; Albany 3–0)
- (3:32) SBU – Roland Dempster 8-yard run, Enda Kirby kick (Drive: 7 plays, 70 yards, 3:34; Stony Brook 7–3)

Second Quarter

- (1:44) ALB – James Bozek 33-yard field goal (Drive: 7 plays, 38 yards, 2:51; Stony Brook 7–6)
- (0:09) SBU – Michael Mannino 46-yard field goal (Drive: 7 plays, 47 yards, 1:35; Stony Brook 10–6)

Third Quarter

- (13:14) SBU – Chris Zellous 28-yard run, Michael Mannino kick (Drive: 5 plays, 75 yards, 1:46; Stony Brook 17–6)
- (9:27) SBU – Chris Zellous 1-yard run, Michael Mannino kick (Drive: 7 plays, 54 yards, 2:57; Stony Brook 24–6)
- (1:35) SBU – Dez Williams 17-yard pass from Chris Zellous, Michael Mannino kick (Drive: 7 plays, 64 yards, 2:57; Stony Brook 31–6)

Fourth Quarter

- (13:13) SBU – Chris Zellous 1-yard run (Drive: 1 play, 1 yard, 0:05; Stony Brook 37–6)
- (11:57) ALB – Jasiah Barron 47-yard pass from Aidan Semo (Drive: 4 plays, 75 yards, 1:16; Stony Brook 37–12)
- (6:45) SBU – Michael Mannino 34-yard field goal (Drive: 8 plays, 38 yards, 5:12; Stony Brook 40–12)
- (2:07) SBU – Dylan Harris 3-yard run, Michael Mannino kick (Drive: 6 plays, 25 yards, 3:56; Stony Brook 47–12)

Statistics	STBK	ALB
First downs	28	10
Total yards	473	198
Rushing yards	223	50
Passing yards	250	148
Passing: Comp–Att–Int	21–31–0	8–23–1
Time of possession	36:50	23:10

Team	Category	Player	Statistics
Stony Brook	Passing	Chris Zellous	20/30, 241 yards, TD
Stony Brook	Rushing	Roland Dempster	20 carries, 105 yards, TD
Stony Brook	Receiving	Dez Williams	6 receptions, 87 yards, TD
Albany	Passing	Colin Parachek	5/18, 82 yards, INT
Albany	Rushing	Alex Jreige	4 carries, 13 yards
Albany	Receiving	Jasiah Barron	2 receptions, 64 yards, TD

=== at No. 11 Monmouth ===
Stony Brook Seawolves (3-3) vs. No. 11 Monmouth Hawks (5-1) – Game summary

Quarter	1	2	3	4	Total
Seawolves	7	7	7	0	21
No. 11 Hawks	14	7	7	21	49

at Kessler Field • West Long Branch, NJ

- Date: October 18
- Game time: 1:00 PM EDT
- Game weather: Sunny • Temperature: 62 °F (17 °C) • Wind: SE at 5 miles per hour (8.0 km/h)
- Game attendance: 3,198
- Referee: Henry Wimberg
- TV announcers (FloSports): Eddy Occhipinti (play-by-play), Emory Hunt (analyst) and Brandon London (sideline)

Game information

First Quarter

- (12:21) MONM – Gavin Nelson 28-yard pass from Derek Robertson, Hudson Fiene kick (Drive: 8 plays, 75 yards, 2:39; Monmouth 7-0)
- (7:57) MONM – Josh Derry 19-yard pass from Derek Robertson, Hudson Fiene kick (Drive: 5 plays, 41 yards, 2:21; Monmouth 14-0)
- (7:44) STBK – Jayce Freeman 95-yard kickoff return, Michael Mannino kick (Monmouth 14-7)

Second Quarter

- (13:06) MONM – Tra Neal 15-yard pass from Derek Robertson, Hudson Fiene kick (Drive: 10 plays, 80 yards, 4:38; Monmouth 21-7)
- (0:15) STBK – Roland Dempster 1-yard run, Michael Mannino kick (Drive: 11 plays, 95 yards, 2:11; Monmouth 21-14)

Third Quarter

- (6:16) MONM – Ryan Russo 50-yard interception return, Hudson Fiene kick (Monmouth 28-14)
- (0:29) STBK – Chris Zellous 8-yard pass from MarQeese Dietz, Michael Mannino kick (Drive: 10 plays, 77 yards, 3:12; Monmouth 28-21)

Fourth Quarter

- (13:03) MONM – Tra Neal 13-yard pass from Frankie Weaver, Hudson Fiene kick (Drive: 7 plays, 75 yards, 2:26; Monmouth 35-21)
- (11:59) MONM – Rodney Nelson 1-yard run, Hudson Fiene kick (Drive: 2 plays, 2 yards, 0:25; Monmouth 42-21)
- (4:52) MONM – Rodney Nelson 73-yard run, Hudson Fiene kick (Drive: 3 plays, 75 yards, 1:36; Monmouth 49-21)

Statistics	STBK	MONM
First downs	26	20
Total yards	423	415
Rushing yards	210	150
Passing yards	213	265
Passing: Comp–Att–Int	25–42–2	23–35–0
Time of possession	32:49	27:11

Team	Category	Player	Statistics
Stony Brook	Passing	Chris Zellous	13/22, 103 yards, 2 INT
Stony Brook	Rushing	Chris Zellous	17 carries, 107 yards
Stony Brook	Receiving	Jayce Freeman	5 receptions, 63 yards
Monmouth	Passing	Derek Robertson	19/29, 204 yards, 3 TD
Monmouth	Rushing	Rodney Nelson	20 carries, 141 yards, 2 TD
Monmouth	Receiving	Josh Derry	7 receptions, 109 yards, TD

=== Towson ===
Towson Tigers (3-4) vs. Stony Brook Seawolves (3-4) – Game summary

Quarter	1	2	3	4	Total
Tigers	-	-	-	-	0
Seawolves	-	-	-	-	0

at Kenneth P. LaValle Stadium • Stony Brook, NY

- Date: October 25
- Game time: 3:30 PM EDT

Statistics	TOW	STBK
First downs		
Total yards		
Rushing yards		
Passing yards		
Passing: Comp–Att–Int		
Time of possession		

Team	Category	Player	Statistics
Towson	Passing		
Towson	Rushing		
Towson	Receiving		
Stony Brook	Passing		
Stony Brook	Rushing		
Stony Brook	Receiving		

=== at Maine ===
Stony Brook Seawolves (4-4) vs. Maine Black Bears (4-4) – Game summary

Quarter	1	2	3	4	Total
Seawolves	-	-	-	-	0
Black Bears	-	-	-	-	0

at Alfond Sports Stadium • Orono, ME

- Date: November 1
- Game time: 1:00 PM EDT

Statistics	STBK	ME
First downs		
Total yards		
Rushing yards		
Passing yards		
Passing: Comp–Att–Int		
Time of possession		

Team	Category	Player	Statistics
Stony Brook	Passing		
Stony Brook	Rushing		
Stony Brook	Receiving		
Maine	Passing		
Maine	Rushing		
Maine	Receiving		

=== North Carolina A&T ===
North Carolina A&T Aggies (2-7) vs. Stony Brook Seawolves (4-5) – Game summary

Quarter	1	2	3	4	Total
Aggies	-	-	-	-	0
Seawolves	-	-	-	-	0

at Kenneth P. LaValle Stadium • Stony Brook, NY

- Date: November 8
- Game time: 12:00 PM EST

Statistics	NCAT	STBK
First downs		
Total yards		
Rushing yards		
Passing yards		
Passing: Comp–Att–Int		
Time of possession		

Team	Category	Player	Statistics
North Carolina A&T	Passing		
North Carolina A&T	Rushing		
North Carolina A&T	Receiving		
Stony Brook	Passing		
Stony Brook	Rushing		
Stony Brook	Receiving		

=== at No. 10 Villanova ===
Stony Brook Seawolves (5–5) at No. 10 Villanova Wildcats (7–2) – Game summary

Quarter	1	2	3	4	OT	Total
Seawolves	7	0	7	10	3	27
No. 10 Wildcats	10	0	0	14	6	30

at Villanova Stadium • Villanova, PA

- Date: November 15
- Game time: 1:00 PM EST
- Game weather: Sunny • Temperature: 52 °F (11 °C) • Wind: SW at 7 miles per hour (11 km/h)
- Game attendance: 3,111
- Referee: Antonio Marcella
- TV: FloSports

Game information

First quarter

- VILL – Braden Reed 37-yard pass from Pat McQuaide (Jack Barnum kick), 11:43. Wildcats 7–0. Drive: 5 plays, 73 yards, 3:09.
- STBK – Jayce Freeman 64-yard pass from Quinn Boyd (Michael Mannino kick), 10:41. Tied 7–7. Drive: 3 plays, 80 yards, 0:55.
- VILL – Jack Barnum 39-yard field goal, 3:57. Wildcats 10–7. Drive: 5 plays, 23 yards, 2:14.

Second quarter

- No scoring plays.

Third quarter

- STBK – Roland Dempster 2-yard run (Michael Mannino kick), 6:55. Seawolves 14–10. Drive: 6 plays, 42 yards, 2:00.

Fourth quarter

- VILL – Luke Colella 10-yard pass from Pat McQuaide (Jack Barnum kick), 14:56. Wildcats 17–14. Drive: 12 plays, 72 yards, 6:53.
- STBK – Roland Dempster 1-yard run (Michael Mannino kick), 9:54. Seawolves 21–17. Drive: 10 plays, 75 yards, 5:02.
- VILL – Luke Colella 21-yard pass from Pat McQuaide (Jack Barnum kick), 2:49. Wildcats 24–21. Drive: 6 plays, 54 yards, 2:51.
- STBK – Michael Mannino 23-yard field goal, 0:42. Tied 24–24. Drive: 12 plays, 70 yards, 2:07.

Overtime

- STBK – Michael Mannino 44-yard field goal. Seawolves 27–24. Drive: 4 plays, -1 yard.
- VILL – Antonio Johnson 17-yard pass from Pat McQuaide. Wildcats 30–27. Drive: 5 plays, 25 yards.

Statistics	STBK	VILL
First downs	14	24
Plays–yards	60–354	74–440
Rushes–yards	27–76	44–160
Passing yards	278	280
Passing: Comp–Att–Int	21-33-0	18-30-0
Turnovers	1	0
Time of possession	20:09	39:51

Team	Category	Player	Statistics
Stony Brook	Passing	Quinn Boyd	21/33, 278 yards, TD
Stony Brook	Rushing	Roland Dempster	18 carries, 65 yards, 2 TD
Stony Brook	Receiving	Jayce Freeman	6 receptions, 175 yards, TD
Villanova	Passing	Pat McQuaide	18/30, 280 yards, 4 TD
Villanova	Rushing	Isaiah Ragland	15 carries, 97 yards
Villanova	Receiving	Braden Reed	3 receptions, 91 yards, TD

=== Bryant ===
Bryant Bulldogs (0-0) vs. Stony Brook Seawolves (0-0) – Game summary

Quarter	1	2	3	4	Total
Bulldogs	-	-	-	-	0
Seawolves	-	-	-	-	0

at Kenneth P. LaValle Stadium • Stony Brook, NY

- Date: November 22
- Game time: 12:00 PM EST

Statistics	BRY	STBK
First downs		
Total yards		
Rushing yards		
Passing yards		
Passing: Comp–Att–Int		
Time of possession		

Team	Category	Player	Statistics
Bryant	Passing		
Bryant	Rushing		
Bryant	Receiving		
Stony Brook	Passing		
Stony Brook	Rushing		
Stony Brook	Receiving		

== Offseason ==
=== Transfers ===
==== Outgoing ====
Player	Position	Destination
Jackson Dorr	P	Gardner–Webb
Anthony Pecorella	P	Maine
Rushawn Lawrence	DL	Minnesota
Johnny Martin	RB	Temple
Jayce Freeman	WR	Withdrawn

==== Incoming ====
Player	Position	Previous school
MarQeese Dietz	WR	Albany
Aidan Kaler	LB	Charlotte
Chris Zellous	QB	Hampton
Ryan Ruane	DB	Holy Cross
Christian Forbes	OL	Howard
JoJo Garcia	DB	LIU
Alhaji Kamara	DB	Maine
Ikaika Ragsdale	RB	North Texas
Bryson Parker	S	Richmond
Thomas Inge	OL	VMI
