= David Braun =

David Braun may refer to:

- David Braun (lawyer) (died 2013), American entertainment lawyer
- David Braun (American football) (born 1985), American football coach and player
- Davyd Arakhamia (born 1979), also known by the pseudonym David Braun, Russian-born Ukrainian politician and entrepreneur
