= 2025 UCLA Bruins football team =

American college football season

2025 UCLA Bruins football
- Conference: Big Ten Conference
- Record: 3–9 (3–6 Big Ten)
- Head coach: DeShaun Foster (2nd season; first 3 games); Tim Skipper (interim; remainder of season)
- Offensive coordinator: Tino Sunseri (1st season; first four games); Jerry Neuheisel (interim; remainder of season)
- Offensive scheme: Spread
- Defensive coordinator: Ikaika Malloe (2nd season; first three games); Kevin Coyle (interim; remainder of season)
- Base defense: 4–3
- Home stadium: Rose Bowl

Uniform

2025 Big Ten Conference football standings
	Conf.			Overall
Team	W		L	W		L
No. 1 Indiana y$#^	9	–	0	16	–	0
No. 5 Ohio State y^	9	–	0	12	–	2
No. 4 Oregon ^	8	–	1	13	–	2
No. 21 Michigan	7	–	2	9	–	4
No. 20 USC	7	–	2	9	–	4
No. 17 Iowa	6	–	3	9	–	4
Illinois	5	–	4	9	–	4
Washington	5	–	4	9	–	4
Minnesota	5	–	4	8	–	5
Nebraska	4	–	5	7	–	6
Northwestern	4	–	5	7	–	6
Penn State	3	–	6	7	–	6
UCLA	3	–	6	3	–	9
Rutgers	2	–	7	5	–	7
Wisconsin	2	–	7	4	–	8
Maryland	1	–	8	4	–	8
Michigan State	1	–	8	4	–	8
Purdue	0	–	9	2	–	10
Championship: Indiana 13, Ohio State 10
# – College Football Playoff champion; ^ – College Football Playoff participant; $ – Conference champion; y – Championship game participant; As of November 22, 2026; Rankings from AP Poll

The 2025 UCLA Bruins football team represented the University of California, Los Angeles in the Big Ten Conference during the 2025 NCAA Division I FBS football season. The Bruins played their home games at the Rose Bowl located in Pasadena, California.

The Bruins were led by second-year head coach DeShaun Foster, but he was fired on September 14 after the team opened the season 0–3; special assistant to the head coach Tim Skipper was named interim head coach for the remainder of the season. Three days later, on September 17, UCLA parted ways with defensive coordinator Ikaika Malloe. After a demoralizing loss to Northwestern, UCLA and offensive coordinator Tino Sunseri mutually parted ways, ending his tenure with an offense that averaged 14.3 points per game, which ranked No. 132 out of 134 major college teams. In their next game, on October 4, UCLA upset No. 7 Penn State 42–37, becoming the first team to enter a game 0–4 or worse and beat an AP poll top ten opponent since UTEP defeated No. 7 BYU in 1985.

== Schedule ==
Date	Time	Opponent	Site	TV	Result	Attendance
August 30	8:00 p.m.	Utah*	Rose Bowl; Pasadena, CA	FOX	L 10–43	35,032
September 6	5:00 p.m.	at UNLV*	Allegiant Stadium; Paradise, NV	CBSSN	L 23–30	36,117
September 12	7:00 p.m.	New Mexico*	Rose Bowl; Pasadena, CA	BTN	L 10–35	31,163
September 27	12:30 p.m.	at Northwestern	Martin Stadium; Evanston, IL	BTN	L 14–17	12,023
October 4	12:30 p.m.	No. 7 Penn State	Rose Bowl; Pasadena, CA	CBS	W 42–37	39,256
October 11	9:00 a.m.	at Michigan State	Spartan Stadium; East Lansing, MI	BTN	W 38–13	72,109
October 18	4:00 p.m.	Maryland^{†}	Rose Bowl; Pasadena, CA	FS1	W 20–17	35,561
October 25	9:00 a.m.	at No. 2 Indiana	Memorial Stadium; Bloomington, IN (Big Noon Kickoff)	FOX	L 6–56	54,867
November 8	6:00 p.m.	Nebraska	Rose Bowl; Pasadena, CA (Veteran & Armed Forces Appreciation)	FOX/FS2 (Note: First part of the game was moved to FS2 to accommodate the conclusion of the men's basketball game between Michigan State and Arkansas, which originally aired on FOX.)	L 21–28	44,481
November 15	4:30 p.m.	at No. 1 Ohio State	Ohio Stadium; Columbus, OH	NBC	L 10–48	104,168
November 22	7:30 p.m.	Washington	Rose Bowl; Pasadena, CA (Senior Day)	NBC	L 14–48	38,201
November 29	4:30 p.m.	at No. 17 USC	Los Angeles Memorial Coliseum; Los Angeles, CA (Victory Bell)	NBC	L 10–29	69,614
*Non-conference game; ^{†}Homecoming; Rankings from AP Poll (and CFP Rankings, after November 4) - Released prior to game; All times are in Pacific time; Source:

== Preseason ==
- April 18, 2025 – UCLA Football Friday Night Lights, Drake Stadium, 6:00 p.m.
- May 3, 2025 – UCLA Football Spring Showcase, Rose Bowl, 2:00 p.m.
- July 22–24, 2025 – Media Days, Las Vegas (Mandalay Bay)

== Game summaries ==
=== vs Utah ===
Utah Utes (0–0) at UCLA Bruins (0–0) – Game summary

Quarter	1	2	3	4	Total
Utes	13	10	7	13	43
Bruins	0	7	3	0	10

at Rose Bowl • Pasadena, California

- Date: August 30
- Game time: 8:00 p.m.
- Game weather: Partly cloudy • 85 °F (29 °C)
- Game attendance: 35,032
- Referee: Mike McCabe
- TV announcers (FOX): Connor Onion (play-by-play) and Mark Helfrich (analyst)

Game information

First quarter

- UTAH – Wayshawn Parker 13-yard run (Dillon Curtis kick failed), 10:49. Utes 6–0. Drive: 11 plays, 75 yards, 4:11.
- UTAH – Smith Snowden 8-yard run (Dillon Curtis kick), 1:27. Utes 13–0. Drive: 10 plays, 60 yards, 5:10.

Second quarter

- UTAH – Lander Barton 14-yard pass from Devon Dampier (Dillon Curtis kick), 12:44. Utes 20–0. Drive: 5 plays, 49 yards, 2:12.
- UCLA – Anthony Woods 19-yard pass from Nico Iamaleava (Mateen Bhaghani kick), 6:46. Utes 20–7. Drive: 10 plays, 75 yards, 5:58.
- UTAH – Dillon Curtis 54-yard field goal, 0:00. Utes 23–7. Drive: 8 plays, 34 yards, 1:01.

Third quarter

- UCLA – Mateen Bhaghani 46-yard field goal, 12:38. Utes 23–10. Drive: 7 plays, 47 yards, 2:22.
- UTAH – Devon Dampier 2-yard run (Dillon Curtis kick), 2:50. Utes 30–10. Drive: 21 plays, 80 yards, 9:44.

Fourth quarter

- UTAH – Dallen Bentley 2-yard pass from Devon Dampier (run failed), 10:05. Utes 36–10. Drive: 10 plays, 81 yards, 4:49.
- UTAH – NaQuari Rogers 1-yard run (Dillon Curtis kick), 6:29. Utes 43–10. Drive: 4 plays, 29 yards, 2:08.

Statistics	UTAH	UCLA
First downs	30	14
Plays–yards	80–492	50–220
Rushes–yards	54–286	28–84
Passing yards	206	136
Passing: comp–att–int	21–26–0	11–22–1
Turnovers	0	1
Time of possession	37:28	22:32

Team	Category	Player	Statistics
Utah	Passing	Devon Dampier	21/25, 206 yards, 2 TD
Utah	Rushing	Devon Dampier	16 carries, 87 yards, TD
Utah	Receiving	Smith Snowden	6 receptions, 51 yards
UCLA	Passing	Nico Iamaleava	11/22, 136 yards, TD, INT
UCLA	Rushing	Nico Iamaleava	13 carries, 47 yards
UCLA	Receiving	Anthony Woods	3 receptions, 48 yards, TD

=== at UNLV ===
UCLA Bruins (0–1) at UNLV Rebels (2–0) – Game summary

Quarter	1	2	3	4	Total
Bruins	0	3	10	10	23
Rebels	10	13	0	7	30

at Allegiant Stadium • Paradise, Nevada

- Date: September 6
- Game time: 5:00 p.m.
- Game weather: Indoor
- Game attendance: 36,117
- Referee: Bryan Banks
- TV announcers (CBSSN): Rich Waltz (play-by-play), Robert Turbin (analyst), and Jordan Giorgio (sideline)

Game information

First quarter

- UNLV – Ramon Villela 50-yard field goal, 8:01. UNLV 3–0, Drive: 11 plays, 43 yards, 6:59.
- UNLV – Nick Elksnis 21-yard pass from Anthony Colandrea (Ramon Villela kick), 0:13. UNLV 10–0, Drive: 6 plays, 81 yards, 4:28.

Second quarter

- UNLV – Troy Omeire 21-yard pass from Anthony Colandrea (Ramon Villela kick), 5:39. UNLV 17–0, Drive: 11 plays, 87 yards, 5:38.
- UNLV – Keyvone Lee 19-yard run, 1:49. UNLV 23–0, Drive: 5 plays, 44 yards, 1:41.
- UCLA – Mateen Bhagani 33-yard field goal, 0:04. UNLV 23–3, Drive: 9 plays, 46 yards, 1:31.

Third quarter

- UCLA – Noah Fox-Flores 4-yard pass from Nico Iamaleava (Mateen Bhaghani kick), 7:48. UNLV 23–10, Drive: 12 plays, 75 yards, 7:12.
- UCLA – Mateen Bhagani 35-yard field goal, 0:03. UNLV 23–13, Drive: 14 plays, 52 yards, 6:50.

Fourth quarter

- UNLV – Var'Keyes Gumms 17-yard pass from Anthony Colandrea (Ramon Villela kick), 12:04. UNLV 30–13, Drive: 6 plays, 75 yards, 2:59.
- UCLA – Nico Iamaleava 30-yard run (Mateen Bhagnani kick), 8:50. UNLV 30–20, Drive: 8 plays, 78 yards, 3:08.
- UCLA – Mateen Bhagnani 33-yard field goal, 5:25. UNLV 30–23, Drive: 6 plays, 42 yards, 1:35.

Statistics	UCLA	UNLV
First downs	27	20
Plays–yards	72–428	53–351
Rushes–yards	30–173	32–148
Passing yards	255	203
Passing: comp–att–int	29–42–1	15–21–0
Turnovers	2	0
Time of possession	31:26	28:34

Team	Category	Player	Statistics
UCLA	Passing	Nico Iamaleava	29/41, 255 yards, TD, INT
UCLA	Rushing	Nico Iamaleava	11 carries, 59 yards, TD
UCLA	Receiving	Kwazi Gilmer	8 receptions, 87 yards
UNLV	Passing	Anthony Colandrea	15/21, 203 yards, 3 TD
UNLV	Rushing	Anthony Colandrea	11 carries, 59 yards
UNLV	Receiving	Var'keyes Gumms	3 receptions, 40 yards, TD

=== vs New Mexico ===
New Mexico Lobos (1–1) at UCLA Bruins (0–2) – Game summary

Quarter	1	2	3	4	Total
Lobos	7	7	0	21	35
Bruins	0	7	3	0	10

at Rose Bowl • Pasadena, California

- Date: September 12
- Game time: 7:00 p.m.
- Game weather: Clear • Temperature: 71 °F (22 °C) • Wind: SW at 7 miles per hour (11 km/h)
- Game attendance: 31,163
- Referee: Ron Snodrass
- TV announcers (BTN): Carlo Jimenez (play-by-play), Brock Vereen (analyst), and Drea Avent (sideline)

Game information

First quarter

- (3:10) UNM – Scottre Humphrey 1-yard run, Luke Drzewiecki kick (Drive: 9 plays, 64 yards, 5:25; New Mexico 7–0)

Second quarter

- (12:43) UNM – Simon Mapa 8-yard pass from Jack Layne, Luke Drzewiecki kick (Drive: 7 plays, 59 yards, 3:56; New Mexico 14–0)
- (8:59) UCLA – Titus Mokiao-Atimalala 12-yard pass from Nico Iamaleava, Mateen Bhaghani kick (Drive: 8 plays, 78 yards, 3:39; New Mexico 14–7)

Third quarter

- (3:34) UCLA – Mateen Bhaghani 51-yard field goal (Drive: 5 plays, 26 yards, 3:00; New Mexico 14–10)

Fourth quarter

- (10:42) UNM – Damon Bankston 2-yard run, Luke Drzewiecki kick (Drive: 13 plays, 75 yards, 7:52; New Mexico 21–10)
- (7:06) UNM – Damon Bankston 43-yard pass from Jack Layne, Luke Drzewiecki kick (Drive: 3 plays, 42 yards, 2:07; New Mexico 28–10)
- (0:36) UNM – D. J. McKinney 3-yard run, Luke Drzewiecki kick (Drive: 7 plays, 74 yards, 3:22; New Mexico 35–10)

Statistics	UNM	UCLA
First downs	22	15
Plays–yards	63–450	56–326
Rushes–yards	46–298	22–109
Passing yards	152	217
Passing: comp–att–int	12–17–0	22–34–1
Turnovers	2	1
Time of possession	36:38	23:22

Team	Category	Player	Statistics
New Mexico	Passing	Jack Layne	12/16, 152 yards, 2 TD
New Mexico	Rushing	Damon Bankston	15 carries, 154 yards, TD
New Mexico	Receiving	Damon Bankston	3 receptions, 49 yards, TD
UCLA	Passing	Nico Iamaleava	22/34, 217 yards, TD, INT
UCLA	Rushing	Anthony Woods	10 carries, 64 yards
UCLA	Receiving	Mikey Matthews	3 receptions, 67 yards

=== at Northwestern ===
UCLA Bruins (0–3) at Northwestern Wildcats (1–2) – Game summary

Quarter	1	2	3	4	Total
Bruins	0	3	3	8	14
Wildcats	3	14	0	0	17

at Martin Stadium • Evanston, Illinois

- Date: September 27
- Game time: 12:30 p.m.
- Game weather: Sunny • Temperature: 83 °F (28 °C) • Wind: NE at 6 miles per hour (9.7 km/h)
- Game attendance: 12,023
- Referee: Francisco Villar
- TV announcers (BTN): Jeff Levering (play-by-play), Jake Butt (analyst), and Brooke Fletcher (sideline)

Game information

First quarter

- NU – Jack Olsen 33-yard field goal, 2:20. Wildcats 3–0. Drive: 17 plays, 74 yards, 9:09.

Second quarter

- NU – Caleb Komolafe 9-yard run (Jack Olsen kick), 13:29. Wildcats 10–0. Drive: 6 plays, 69 yards, 2:57.
- NU – Griffin Wilde 10-yard pass from Preston Stone (Jack Olsen kick), 3:33. Wildcats 17–0. Drive: 5 plays, 64 yards, 2:46.
- UCLA – Mateen Bhaghani 28-yard field goal, 0:00. Wildcats 17–3. Drive: 13 plays, 73 yards, 3:26.

Third quarter

- UCLA – Mateen Bhaghani 25-yard field goal, 2:49. Wildcats 17–6. Drive: 12 plays, 73 yards, 6:12.

Fourth quarter

- UCLA – Kwazi Gilmer 29-yard pass from Nico Iamaleava (Nico Iamaleava–Anthony Woods pass), 6:19. Wildcats 17–14. Drive: 5 plays, 80 yards, 1:29.

Statistics	UCLA	NU
First downs	21	18
Plays–yards	63–314	60–311
Rushes–yards	42–199	30–131
Passing yards	115	180
Passing: comp–att–int	12–18–0	19–27–0
Turnovers	0	0
Time of possession	34:21	25:39

Team	Category	Player	Statistics
UCLA	Passing	Nico Iamaleava	19/27, 180 yards, TD
UCLA	Rushing	Nico Iamaleava	14 carries, 65 yards
UCLA	Receiving	Kwazi Gilmer	3 receptions, 51 yards, TD
Northwestern	Passing	Preston Stone	12/18, 115 yards, TD
Northwestern	Rushing	Caleb Komolafe	27 carries, 119 yards, TD
Northwestern	Receiving	Griffin Wilde	7 receptions, 98 yards, TD

=== vs No. 7 Penn State ===
No. 7 Penn State Nittany Lions (3–1) at UCLA Bruins (0–4) – Game summary

Quarter	1	2	3	4	Total
No. 7 Nittany Lions	7	0	14	16	37
Bruins	10	17	7	8	42

at Rose Bowl • Pasadena, Cali,fornia

- Date: October 4
- Game time: 12:30 p.m.
- Game weather: Sunny, • Temperature: 72 °F (22 °C) • Wind: South at 3 miles per hour (4.8 km/h)
- Game attendance: 39,256
- Referee: Gregory Blum
- TV announcers (CBS): Brad Nessler (play-by-play), Gary Danielson (analyst), and Jenny Dell (sideline)
- ESPN box score

Game information

First quarter

- UCLA – Kwazi Gilmer 11-yard pass from Nico Iamaleava (Mateen Bhaghani kick), 10:32. Bruins 7–0. Drive: 11 plays, 75 yards, 4:34.
- UCLA – Mateen Bhaghani 24-yard field goal, 7:22. Bruins 10–0. Drive: 7 plays, 40 yards, 3:05.
- PSU – Kaytron Allen 13-yard run (Ryan Barker kick), 5:14. Bruins 10–7. Drive: 10 plays, 75 yards, 5:14.

Second quarter

- UCLA – Titus Mokiao-Atimalala 6-yard pass from Nico Iamaleava (Mateen Bhaghani kick), 8:52. Bruins 17–7. Drive: 17 plays, 75 yards, 8:16.
- UCLA – Nico Iamaleava 3-yard run (Mateen Bhaghani kick), 4:49. Bruins 24–7. Drive: 6 plays, 68 yards, 3:07.
- UCLA – Mateen Bhaghani 54-yard field goal, 0:00. Bruins 27–7. Drive: 3 plays, 17 yards, 0:22.

Third quarter

- PSU – Khalil Dinkins 40-yard pass from Drew Allar (Ryan Barker kick), 11:32. Bruins 27–14. Drive: 5 plays, 62 yards, 1:44.
- PSU – Liam Clifford 6-yard return of blocked punt (Ryan Barker kick), 7:25. Bruins 27–21.
- UCLA – Nico Iamaleava 1-yard run (Mateen Bhaghani kick), 2:58. Bruins 34–21. Drive: 8 plays, 75 yards, 4:24.

Fourth quarter

- PSU – Kaytron Allen 2-yard run (Ryan Barker kick), 14:27. Bruins 34–28. Drive: 10 plays, 75 yards, 3:29.
- UCLA – Nico Iamaleava 7-yard run (Nico Iamaleava–Kwazi Gilmer pass), 6:46. Bruins 42–28. Drive: 13 plays, 75 yards, 7:45.
- PSU – Kyron Hudson 15-yard pass from Drew Allar (Ryan Barker kick), 4:11. Bruins 42–35. Drive: 10 plays, 75 yards, 2:30.
- PSU – A.J. Harris Safety, 0:17. Bruins 42–37.

Statistics	PSU	UCLA
First downs	21	22
Plays–yards	57–357	77–435
Rushes–yards	31–157	53–269
Passing yards	200	166
Passing: comp–att–int	19–26–0	17–24–0
Turnovers	1	0
Time of possession	20:43	39:17

Team	Category	Player	Statistics
Penn State	Passing	Drew Allar	19/26, 200 yards, 2 TD
Penn State	Rushing	Drew Allar	11 carries, 78 yards
Penn State	Receiving	Kyron Hudson	4 receptions, 52 yards, TD
UCLA	Passing	Nico Iamaleava	17/24, 166 yards, 2 TD
UCLA	Rushing	Nico Iamaleava	16 carries, 128 yards, 3 TD
UCLA	Receiving	Kwazi Gilmer	5 receptions, 79 yards, TD

=== at Michigan State ===
UCLA Bruins (1–4) at Michigan State Spartans (3–2) – Game summary

Quarter	1	2	3	4	Total
Bruins	10	14	14	0	38
Spartans	7	0	0	6	13

at Spartan Stadium • East Lansing, Michigan

- Date: October 11
- Game time: 9:00 a.m.
- Game weather: Sunny, • Temperature: 56 °F (13 °C) • Wind: NW at 10 miles per hour (16 km/h)
- Game attendance: 72,109
- Referee: Bryan Banks
- TV announcers (BTN): Mark Followill (play-by-play), Yogi Roth (analyst), Rhett Lewis (sideline)
- ESPN box score

Game information

First quarter

- (9:07) MSU – Aidan Chiles 2‑yard run, Martin Connington kick (Drive: 10 plays, 59 yards, 4:49; Michigan State 7–0)
- (4:41) UCLA – Mateen Bhaghani 47‑yard field goal (Drive: 10 plays, 46 yards, 4:26; Michigan State 7–3)
- (1:39) UCLA – Jalen Berger 16‑yard run, Mateen Bhaghani kick (Drive: 3 plays, 34 yards, 1:25; UCLA 10–7)

Second quarter

- (10:17) UCLA – Jalen Berger 3‑yard pass from Nico Iamaleava, Mateen Bhaghani kick (Drive: 10 plays, 63 yards, 5:21; UCLA 17–7)
- (4:09) UCLA – Titus Mokiao‑Atimalala 12‑yard pass from Nico Iamaleava, Mateen Bhaghani kick (Drive: 8 plays, 32 yards, 4:05; UCLA 24–7)

Third quarter

- (3:55) UCLA – Jaivian Thomas 1‑yard run, Mateen Bhaghani kick (Drive: 11 plays, 62 yards, 6:46; UCLA 31–7)
- (1:44) UCLA – Jalen Berger 13‑yard pass from Nico Iamaleava, Mateen Bhaghani kick (Drive: 4 plays, 33 yards, 1:12; UCLA 38–7)

Fourth quarter

- (13:09) MSU – Nick Marsh 5‑yard pass from Alessio Milivojevic, Martin Connington kick missed (Drive: 9 plays, 75 yards, 3:35; UCLA 38–13)

Statistics	UCLA	MSU
First downs	20	14
Plays–yards	67-418	60-253
Rushes–yards	43-238	25-87
Passing yards	180	166
Passing: comp–att–int	16-24-0	16-35-0
Turnovers	0	1
Time of possession	36:24	23:36

Team	Category	Player	Statistics
UCLA	Passing	Nico Iamaleava	16/24, 180 yards, 3 TD
UCLA	Rushing	Jalen Berger	12 carries, 89 yards, TD
UCLA	Receiving	Mikey Matthews	2 receptions, 46 yards
Michigan State	Passing	Alessio Milivojevic	8/18, 100 yards, TD
Michigan State	Rushing	Makhi Frazier	12 carries, 58 yards
Michigan State	Receiving	Nick Marsh	7 receptions, 77 yards, TD

=== vs Maryland (Homecoming) ===
Maryland Terrapins (4–2) at UCLA Bruins (2–4) – Game summary

Quarter	1	2	3	4	Total
Terrapins	0	3	7	7	17
Bruins	0	7	0	13	20

at Rose Bowl • Pasadena, California

- Date: October 18
- Game time: 4:05 p.m.
- Game weather: Sunny • Temperature: 83 °F (28 °C) • Wind: SW at 5 miles per hour (8.0 km/h)
- Game attendance: 35,561
- Referee: Tim O'Dey
- TV announcers (FS1): Noah Reed (play-by-play) and Robert Smith (analyst)
- ESPN box score

Game information

First quarter

- No scoring plays.

Second quarter

- (14:11) MD – Sean O'Haire 24-yard field goal (Drive: 17 plays, 88 yards, 8:09; Maryland 3–0)
- (12:05) UCLA – Anthony Frias II 55-yard run, Mateen Bhaghani kick (Drive: 4 plays, 71 yards, 2:03; UCLA 7–3)

Third quarter

- (4:40) MD – Jamare Glasker 8-yard interception return, Ryan Capriotti kick (Drive: 0:33; Maryland 10–7)

Fourth quarter

- (3:33) UCLA – Mikey Matthews 14-yard pass from Nico Iamaleava, Mateen Bhaghani kick (Drive: 8 plays, 80 yards, 2:06; UCLA 14–10)
- (2:04) UCLA – Mateen Bhaghani 42-yard field goal (Drive: 4 plays, −4 yards, 0:52; UCLA 17–10)
- (0:40) MD – Jalil Farooq 8-yard pass from Malik Washington, Ryan Capriotti kick (Drive: 9 plays, 75 yards, 1:24; Tie 17–17)
- (0:02) UCLA – Mateen Bhaghani 23-yard field goal (Drive: 5 plays, 68 yards, 0:33; UCLA 20–17)

Statistics	MD	UCLA
First downs	17	21
Plays–yards	74–337	70–414
Rushes–yards	26–127	35–193
Passing yards	210	221
Passing: comp–att–int	23–48–1	21–35–2
Turnovers	2	3
Time of possession	27:00	33:00

Team	Category	Player	Statistics
Maryland	Passing	Malik Washington	23/48, 210 yards, TD, INT
Maryland	Rushing	Malik Washington	6 carries, 67 yards
Maryland	Receiving	DeJuan Williams	7 receptions, 86 yards
UCLA	Passing	Nico Iamaleava	21/35, 221 yards, TD, 2 INT
UCLA	Rushing	Anthony Frias II	4 carries, 97 yards, TD
UCLA	Receiving	Titus Mokiao-Atimalala	6 receptions, 102 yards

=== at No. 2 Indiana ===
UCLA Bruins (3–4) at No. 2 Indiana Hoosiers (7–0) – Game summary

Quarter	1	2	3	4	Total
Bruins	0	3	3	0	6
No. 2 Hoosiers	14	21	14	7	56

at Memorial Stadium • Bloomington, Indiana

- Date: October 25
- Game time: 9:00 a.m.
- Game weather: Sunny
- Game attendance: 54,867
- Referee: Mark Kluczynski
- TV announcers (FOX): Gus Johnson (play-by-play), Joel Klatt (analyst), and Jenny Taft (sideline)

Game information

First quarter

- IU – Aiden Fisher 25-yard interception return (Nico Radicic kick) 14:03. Hoosiers 7–0
- IU – Roman Hemby 1-yard run (Nico Radicic kick), 4:02. Hoosiers 14–0. 8 plays, 59 yards, 4:04.

Second quarter

- IU – Elijah Sarratt 1-yard pass from Fernando Mendoza (Nico Radicic kick), 12:30. Hoosiers 21–0. 11 plays, 75 yards, 4:46.
- IU – Roman Hemby 13-yard run (Nico Radicic kick), 8:44.Hoosiers 28–0. 3 plays, 29 yards, 1:15.
- UCLA – Mateen Bhaghani 44-yard field goal, 1:55.Hoosiers 28–3. 7 plays, 36 yards, 3:21.
- IU – E.J. Williams Jr. 2-yard pass from Fernando Mendoza (Nico Radicic kick), 00:13. Hoosiers 35–3. 8 plays, 75 yards, 1:36.

Third quarter

- IU – Fernando Mendoza 20-yard run (Nico Radicic kick), 9:15. Hoosiers 42–3. 10 plays, 75 yards, 5:45.
- IU – E.J. Williams Jr. 62-yard pass from Fernando Mendoza (Nico Radicic kick), 4:13. Hoosiers 49–3. 6 plays, 74 yards, 3:35.
- UCLA – Mateen Bhaghani 30-yard field goal, 00:23.Hoosiers 49–6. 10 plays, 64 yards, 3:50.

Fourth quarter

- IU – Alberto Mendoza 4-yard run (Nico Radicic kick), 11:11. Hoosiers 56–6. 10 plays, 75 yards, 4:12.

Statistics	UCLA	IU
First downs	12	27
Plays–yards	53–201	76–475
Rushes–yards	25–88	47–262
Passing yards	113	213
Passing: comp–att–int	13–28–2	19–29–2
Turnovers	3	2
Time of possession	24:26	35:34

Team	Category	Player	Statistics
UCLA	Passing	Nico Iamaleava	13/27, 113 yards, 2 INT
UCLA	Rushing	Nico Iamaleava	7 carries, 46 yards
UCLA	Receiving	Rico Flores Jr.	4 receptions, 50 yards
Indiana	Passing	Fernando Mendoza	15/22, 168 yards, 3 TD, INT
Indiana	Rushing	Roman Hemby	17 carries, 81 yards, 2 TD
Indiana	Receiving	E.J. Williams Jr.	5 receptions, 109 yards, 2 TD

=== vs Nebraska ===
Nebraska Cornhuskers (6–3) at UCLA Bruins (3–5) – Game summary

Quarter	1	2	3	4	Total
Cornhuskers	7	14	7	0	28
Bruins	0	7	7	7	21

at Rose Bowl • Pasadena, California

- Date: November 8
- Game time: 6:15 p.m.
- Game weather: Sunny, 69 degrees, Wind South @ 2 mph
- Game attendance: 44,481
- Referee: Francisco Villar
- TV announcers (FOX): Tim Brando (play-by-play), Devin Gardner (analyst), and Josh Sims (sideline)

Game information

First Quarter

- (6:29) NEB – Jacory Barney Jr. 2-yard pass from TJ Lateef, Kyle Cunanan kick (Drive: 9 plays, 61 yards, 5:19, Nebraska 7–0)

Second Quarter

- (13:14) UCLA - Jalen Berger 1-yard run, Mateen Bhaghani kick (Drive: 17 plays, 75 yards, 9:46, 7-7)
- (11:01) NEB - Emmett Johnson 56-yard pass from TJ Lateef, Kyle Cunanan kick (Drive: 4 plays, 75 yards, 2:13, Nebraska 14-7)
- (1:47) NEB - Emmett Johnson 1-yard run, Kyle Cunanan kick (Drive: 9 plays, 60 yards, 4:31, Nebraska 21-7)

Third Quarter

- (11:44) NEB - Emmett Johnson 40-yard pass from TJ Lateef, Kyle Cunanan kick (Drive: 6 plays, 75 yards, 3:16, Nebraska 28-7)
- (9:58) UCLA - Anthony Woods 45-yard pass from Nico Iamaleava, Mateen Bhaghani kick (Drive: 4 plays, 69 yards, 1:39, Nebraska 28-14)

Fourth Quarter

- (4:54) UCLA - Anthony Frias II 9-yard pass from Nico Iamaleava, Mateen Bhaghani kick (Drive: 12 plays, 96 yards, 6:39, Nebraska 28-21)

Statistics	NEB	UCLA
First downs	20	21
Plays–yards	54–361	64–348
Rushes–yards	39–156	37–157
Passing yards	205	191
Passing: comp–att–int	13–15–0	17–27–0
Turnovers	0	0
Time of possession	30:00	30:00

Team	Category	Player	Statistics
Nebraska	Passing	TJ Lateef	13/15, 205 yards, 3 TD
Nebraska	Rushing	Emmett Johnson	28 carries, 129 yards, TD
Nebraska	Receiving	Jacory Barney Jr.	4 receptions, 19 yards, TD
UCLA	Passing	Nico Iamaleava	17/25, 191 yards, 2 TD
UCLA	Rushing	Nico Iamaleava	15 carries, 86 yards
UCLA	Receiving	Rico Flores Jr.	6 receptions, 52 yards

=== at No. 1 Ohio State ===
UCLA Bruins (3–6) at No. 1 Ohio State Buckeyes (9–0) – Game summary

Quarter	1	2	3	4	Total
Bruins	0	0	7	3	10
No. 1 Buckeyes	10	14	17	7	48

at Ohio Stadium • Columbus, Ohio

- Date: November 15
- Game time: 4:30 p.m.
- Game weather: Cloudy • Temperature: 62 °F (17 °C) • Wind: SW at 15 miles per hour (24 km/h)
- Game attendance: 104,168
- Referee: Ron Snodgrass
- TV announcers (NBC): Noah Eagle (play-by-play), Todd Blackledge (analyst), and Kathryn Tappen (sideline)

Game information

First quarter

- (8:47) OSU – Bo Jackson 1-yard run, Jayden Fielding kick (Drive: 8 plays, 71 yards, 3:54; Ohio State 7–0)
- (0:04) OSU – Jayden Fielding 41-yard field goal (Drive: 11 plays, 60 yards, 5:41; Ohio State 10–0)

Second quarter

- (4:41) OSU – Bryson Rodgers 11-yard pass from Julian Sayin, Jayden Fielding kick (Drive: 12 plays, 82 yards, 6:51; Ohio State 17–0)
- (1:19) OSU – James Peoples 19-yard run, Jayden Fielding kick (Drive: 5 plays, 81 yards, 1:53; Ohio State 24–0)
- (0:01) OSU – Jayden Fielding 33-yard field goal (Drive: 2 plays, 0 yards, 0:09; Ohio State 27–0)

Third quarter

- (2:27) OSU – Isaiah West 1-yard run, Jayden Fielding kick (Drive: 13 plays, 69 yards, 6:16; Ohio State 34–0)
- (0:17) UCLA – Kwazi Gilmer 18-yard pass from Luke Duncan, Mateen Bhaghani kick (Drive: 5 plays, 75 yards, 2:10; Ohio State 34–7)
- (0:03) OSU – Lorenzo Styles Jr. 100-yard kickoff return, Jayden Fielding kick (Ohio State 41–7)

Fourth quarter

- (8:49) UCLA – Mateen Bhaghani 32-yard field goal (Drive: 12 plays, 61 yards, 6:14; Ohio State 41–10)
- (1:54) OSU – James Peoples 8-yard run, Jayden Fielding kick (Drive: 11 plays, 75 yards, 6:55; Ohio State 48–10)

Statistics	UCLA	OSU
First downs	8	25
Plays–yards	48–222	67–440
Rushes–yards	25–68	33–222
Passing yards	154	218
Passing: comp–att–int	16–23–0	26–34–0
Turnovers	0	0
Time of possession	25:01	34:59

Team	Category	Player	Statistics
UCLA	Passing	Luke Duncan	16/23, 154 yards, TD
UCLA	Rushing	Anthony Woods	5 carries, 20 yards
UCLA	Receiving	Rico Flores Jr.	2 receptions, 59 yards
Ohio State	Passing	Julian Sayin	23/31, 184 yards, TD
Ohio State	Rushing	Bo Jackson	15 carries, 112 yards, TD
Ohio State	Receiving	Jeremiah Smith	4 receptions, 40 yards

=== vs Washington (Senior Day) ===
Washington Huskies (7–3) at UCLA Bruins (3–7) – Game summary

Quarter	1	2	3	4	Total
Huskies	3	17	14	14	48
Bruins	0	0	7	7	14

at Rose Bowl • Pasadena, California

- Date: November 22
- Game time: 7:30 p.m.
- Game weather: Sunny
- Game attendance: 38,201
- Referee: Jason Nickelby
- TV announcers (NBC): Paul Burmeister (play-by-play), Yogi Roth (analyst), and Caroline Pineda (sideline)

Game information

First quarter

- (1:10) WASH - Grady Gross 36-yard field goal (Drive: 4 plays, 2 yards, 0:49; Washington 3-0)

Second quarter

- (10:56) WASH - Demond Williams Jr. 25-yard run (Grady Gross kick) (Drive: 8 plays, 65 yards, 3:52; Washington 10-0)
- (5:46) WASH - Grady Gross 22-yard field goal (Drive: 8 plays, 41 yards, 3:04; Washington 13-0)
- (1:44) WASH - Alex McLaughlin 59-yard fumble return (Grady Gross kick) (Drive: 4 plays, -76 yards, 1:27; Washington 20-0)

Third quarter

- (10:38) WASH - Demond Williams Jr. 11-yard run (Grady Gross kick) (Drive: 6 plays, 55 yards, 2:57; Washington 27-0)
- (5:24) WASH - Dezmen Roebuck 18-yard pass from Demond Williams Jr. (Grady Gross kick) (Drive: 4 plays, 68 yards, 2:57; Washington 34-0)
- (2:53) UCLA - Mikey Matthews 37-yard pass from Luke Duncan (Mateen Bhaghani kick) (Drive: 7 plays, 82 yards, 2:26; Washington 34-7)

Fourth quarter

- (12:53) WASH - Jonah Coleman 1-yard run (Grady Gross kick) (Drive: 11 plays, 75 yards, 5:00; Washington 41-7)
- (11:19) UCLA - Jamir Benjamin 13-yard fumble return (Mateen Bhaghani kick) (Drive: 4 plays, 8 yards, 1:34; Washington 41-14)
- (7:14) WASH - Decker DeGraaf 24-yard pass from Demond Williams Jr. (Grady Gross kick) (Drive: 7 plays, 75 yards, 4:05; Washington 48-14)

Statistics	WASH	UCLA
First downs	25	10
Plays–yards	69–426	60–207
Rushes–yards	39–212	22–57
Passing yards	214	150
Passing: comp–att–int	18–28–1	21–37–0
Turnovers	2	3
Time of possession	34:27	25:33

Team	Category	Player	Statistics
Washington	Passing	Demond Williams Jr.	17/26, 213 yards, 2 TD, INT
Washington	Rushing	Adam Mohammed	21 carries, 108 yards
Washington	Receiving	Dezmen Roebuck	7 receptions, 96 yards, TD
UCLA	Passing	Luke Duncan	5/11, 81 yards, TD
UCLA	Rushing	Jalen Berger	6 carries, 26 yards
UCLA	Receiving	Mikey Matthews	6 receptions, 38 yards, TD

=== at No. 17 USC (Victory Bell) ===
UCLA Bruins (3–8) at No. 17 USC Trojans (8–3) – Game summary

Quarter	1	2	3	4	Total
Bruins	0	10	0	0	10
No. 17 Trojans	7	0	7	15	29

at Los Angeles Memorial Coliseum • Los Angeles, California

- Date: November 29
- Game time: 4:30 p.m.
- Game weather: Sunny • Temperature: 72 °F (22 °C) • Wind: SSW at 4 miles per hour (6.4 km/h)
- Game attendance: 69,614
- Referee: Gregory Blum
- TV announcers (NBC): Noah Eagle (play-by-play), Todd Blackledge (analyst), and Kathryn Tappen (sideline)

Game information

First quarter

- (9:15) USC – King Miller 5-yard run (Ryon Sayeri kick), (Drive: 10 plays, 75 yards, 5:45; USC 7–0)

Second quarter

- (11:23) UCLA – Kwazi Gilmer 2-yard pass from Nico Lamaleava (Mateen Bhaghani kick), (Drive: 13 plays, 79 yards, 7:50; Tied 7–7)
- (0:18) UCLA – Mateen Bhaghani 38-yard field goal (Drive: 13 plays, 60 yards, 5:24; UCLA 10–7)

Third quarter

- (0:25) USC – Makai Lemon 42-yard pass from Jayden Maiava (Ryon Sayeri kick), (Drive: 10 plays, 91 yards, 4:52; USC 14–10)

Fourth quarter

- (11:24) USC – Lake McRee 2-yard pass from Jayden Maiava (Ryon Sayeri kick), (Drive: 4 plays, 57 yards, 2:30; USC 21–10)
- (2:29) USC – King Miller 41-yard run (Gage Roy–Walker Lyons pass), (Drive: 4 plays, 50 yards, 1:48; USC 29–10)

Statistics	UCLA	USC
First downs	20	22
Plays–yards	64–308	55–388
Rushes–yards	26–108	26–131
Passing yards	200	257
Passing: comp–att–int	27–38–0	21–29–0
Turnovers	0	0
Time of possession	33:16	26:44

Team	Category	Player	Statistics
UCLA	Passing	Nico Iamaleava	27/38, 200 yards, TD
UCLA	Rushing	Jalen Berger	7 carries, 57 yards
UCLA	Receiving	Kwazi Gilmer	10 receptions, 73 yards, TD
USC	Passing	Jayden Maiava	21/29, 257 yards, 2 TD
USC	Rushing	King Miller	17 carries, 124 yards, 2 TD
USC	Receiving	Ja'Kobi Lane	3 receptions, 52 yards

== Roster ==
2025 UCLA Bruins football team roster
Players
Coaches
Offense

Pos.	#	Name	Class
RB	0	Jalen Berger	Sr
WR	1	Rico Flores Jr.	So
WR	2	Titus Mokiao-Atimalala	Sr
WR	3	Kwazi Gilmer	So
WR	4	Ezavier Staples	Sr
RB	6	Anthony Woods	Jr
WR	7	Mikey Matthews	Jr
QB	9	Nico Iamaleava	So
QB	10	Madden Iamaleava	Fr
WR	11	Jaedon Wilson	Sr
QB	12	Luke Duncan	So
WR	14	Carter Shaw	So
QB	15	Pierce Clarkson	So
QB	17	Colton Gumino	Fr
QB	18	Henry Hasselbeck	Fr
WR	18	Jadyn Marshall	Jr
QB	19	Karson Gordon	Fr
WR	20	Shane Rosenthal	Fr
RB	21	Jaivian Thomas	Jr
RB	22	Anthony Frias II	Sr
WR	23	Kyle Miller	Sr
WR	24	Jonah Smith	Fr
RB	27	Isaiah Carlson	So
TE	28	Jack Pedersen	Jr
RB	32	Troy Leigber	Fr
RB	33	Karson Cox	Fr
WR	37	Jackson Meehan	Sr
TE	44	Peter Bario	So
OL	50	Nehemiah Johnson	Fr
OL	54	Garrison Blank	Fr
OL	55	Eugene Brooks	Fr
OL	58	Jaylan Jeffers	Sr
OL	62	Michael Sultemeier	Fr
OL	63	K.D. Arnold	Jr
OL	64	Sam Yoon	Jr
OL	66	Jensen Somerville	Fr
OL	67	Yutaka Mahe	Sr
OL	68	Noah Pulealii	Sr
OL	69	Oluwafunto Akinshilo	Sr
OL	70	Caleb Walker	Jr
OL	71	Reuben Unije	Sr
OL	72	Garrett DiGiorgio	Sr
OL	73	Tautai Li'o Marks	Sr
OL	74	Julian Armella	Jr
OL	75	Conor Clyde	Sr
OL	75	Mark Schroller	Fr
OL	77	Courtland Ford	Sr
TE	81	Hudson Habermehl	Sr
TE	82	Noah Fox-Flores	Fr
WR	83	Russell Weir	Fr
WR	86	Jalen Saint Paul	Fr
TE	87	Dylan Sims	Fr
TE	88	Jake Renda	Jr
WR	89	Jace Brown	Fr

Defense

Pos.	#	Name	Class
LB	0	Donavyn Pellot	Fr
DB	1	Kanye Clark	Fr
DB	2	Andre Jordan Jr.	Jr
DB	3	Robert Stafford III	So
DB	4	Key Lawrence	Sr
LB	6	JonJon Vaughns	Sr
DB	7	Aaron Williams	So
LB	9	Jalen Woods	Jr
LB	10	Ben Perry	Sr
DL	11	Nico Davillier	Sr
DB	12	Jamir Benjamin	Fr
DB	14	LaRue Zamorano III	Fr
DL	15	Anthony Jones	Jr
DL	17	Lucien Holland	Fr
DB	18	Rodrick Pleasant	So
DB	19	Jamier Johnson	Sr
LB	20	Scott Taylor	Fr
DB	21	Cole Martin	So
DB	22	Croix Stewart	Jr
DB	23	Bryon Threats	Sr
DL	24	Cole Cogshell	Fr
DB	25	Kuron Jabari Jr.	Fr
DB	27	Jadyn Hudson	Fr
DB	28	Scooter Jackson	Jr
DB	29	Marquise Villahermosa	So
DB	30	Zeke Johnson	Fr
DB	31	Chase Coleman	Fr
LB	32	Isaiah Chisom	So
LB	33	Ty Lee	So
DL	35	Robert James III	Fr
LB	36	Wyatt Mosier	So
DB	37	Joshua Dixon	So
LB	40	Mone Malafu	So
LB	41	Jewelous "JuJu" Walls	Fr
DB	43	Brett Barry	Fr
DL	44	Devin Aupiu	Sr
DL	52	Kechaun Bennett	Sr
LB	53	Jacob Reis	Fr
DL	54	Ashton Sanders	So
DL	55	A.J. Fuimaono	So
DL	58	Gary Smith III	Sr
DL	81	Tyler Partlow	Fr
DL	88	Grant Buckey	Fr
DL	91	Michael Sullivan	Sr
DL	92	Siale Taupaki	Jr
DL	95	Jalen Hargrove	Sr
DL	97	Jacob Busic	Sr
DL	99	Keanu Williams	Sr

Special teams

Pos.	#	Name	Class
LS	30	Halakilangi Muagututi'a	Fr
K	35	Cash Peterman	Sr
LS	41	Morrow Evans	Fr
P	49	Will Karoll	Jr
LS	50	Salem Abdul-Wahab	Jr
K	94	Mateen Bhaghani	Jr
P	97	Lennox Miller	Fr

Head coach

- Tim Skipper - Interim Head Coach

Coordinators/assistant coaches

- Jerry Neuheisel – Interim Offensive coordinator
- Kevin Coyle – Interim Defensive coordinator
- Scott White – Associate head coach/Inside linebackers
- Jethro Franklin – Defensive line
- Andy Kwon – Offensive line
- Gabe Lynn – Safeties
- Demetrice Martin – Passing game coordinator/Secondary
- A. J. Steward – Running backs
- Burl Toler III – Passing game coordinator/Recruiting coordinator/Wide receivers

Legend

- (C) Team captain
- (S) Suspended
- (I) Ineligible
- Injured
- Redshirt

Roster
Last update: August 29, 2025

== Awards and honors ==
Recipient	Award (Big-Ten Conference)	Week #	Date awarded	Ref.
Nico Iamaleava	Offensive Player of the Week	4	October 6, 2025	
Mateen Bhaghani	Special Teams Player of the Week	6	October 20, 2025	

- October 6, 2025 – Nico Iamaleava was named the Associated Press National Player of the Week
- October 6, 2025 – UCLA football team was named the Pop-Tarts Crazy Good Team of the Week
- October 7, 2025 – Jerry Neuheisel was named the CBS Sports coordinator of the week
- October 7, 2025 – Nico Iamaleava was named to the Maxwell Award Player of the Week, the Davey O'Brien Quarterback of the Week and the Walter Camp National FBS Offensive Player of the Week.
- October 7, 2025 – Tim Skipper was named to the Dodd Trophy Coach of the Week and to the Bear Bryant Awards Coach of the Week
