= 2025 Northwestern Wildcats football team =

American college football season

2025 Northwestern Wildcats football

GameAbove Sports Bowl champion

GameAbove Sports Bowl, W 34–7 vs. Central Michigan
- Conference: Big Ten Conference
- Record: 7–6 (4–5 Big Ten)
- Head coach: David Braun (3rd season)
- Offensive coordinator: Zach Lujan (2nd season)
- Offensive scheme: Spread
- Defensive coordinator: Tim McGarigle (2nd season)
- Base defense: Multiple 4–3
- Home stadium: Martin Stadium; Wrigley Field

Uniform

2025 Big Ten Conference football standings
	Conf.			Overall
Team	W		L	W		L
No. 1 Indiana y$#^	9	–	0	16	–	0
No. 5 Ohio State y^	9	–	0	12	–	2
No. 4 Oregon ^	8	–	1	13	–	2
No. 21 Michigan	7	–	2	9	–	4
No. 20 USC	7	–	2	9	–	4
No. 17 Iowa	6	–	3	9	–	4
Illinois	5	–	4	9	–	4
Washington	5	–	4	9	–	4
Minnesota	5	–	4	8	–	5
Nebraska	4	–	5	7	–	6
Northwestern	4	–	5	7	–	6
Penn State	3	–	6	7	–	6
UCLA	3	–	6	3	–	9
Rutgers	2	–	7	5	–	7
Wisconsin	2	–	7	4	–	8
Maryland	1	–	8	4	–	8
Michigan State	1	–	8	4	–	8
Purdue	0	–	9	2	–	10
Championship: Indiana 13, Ohio State 10
# – College Football Playoff champion; ^ – College Football Playoff participant; $ – Conference champion; y – Championship game participant; As of November 13, 2026; Rankings from AP Poll

The 2025 Northwestern Wildcats football team represented Northwestern University as a member of the Big Ten Conference during the 2025 NCAA Division I FBS football season. They were led by third-year head coach David Braun. The team played five of its seven home games at a temporary facility constructed at the university's Martin Stadium, with two home games being played at Wrigley Field (the home of the Chicago Cubs) while a permanent replacement for the former Ryan Field was built.

== Schedule ==
Date	Time	Opponent	Site	TV	Result	Attendance
August 30	11:00 a.m.	at Tulane*	Yulman Stadium; New Orleans, LA	ESPNU	L 3–23	22,103
September 5	6:30 p.m.	Western Illinois*	Martin Stadium; Evanston, IL	BTN	W 42–7	9,647
September 13	11:00 a.m.	No. 4 Oregon	Martin Stadium; Evanston, IL (Big Noon Kickoff)	FOX	L 14–34	12,023
September 27	2:30 p.m.	UCLA	Martin Stadium; Evanston, IL	BTN	W 17–14	12,023
October 4	2:30 p.m.	Louisiana–Monroe*^{†}	Martin Stadium; Evanston, IL	BTN	W 42–7	12,023
October 11	2:30 p.m.	at Penn State	Beaver Stadium; University Park, PA	FS1	W 22–21	108,121
October 18	2:00 p.m.	Purdue	Martin Stadium; Evanston, IL	BTN	W 19–0	12,023
October 25	11:00 a.m.	at Nebraska	Memorial Stadium; Lincoln, NE	FS1	L 21–28	86,401
November 7	8:00 p.m.	at No. 19 USC	Los Angeles Memorial Coliseum; Los Angeles, CA	FOX	L 17–38	67,179
November 15	11:00 a.m.	No. 18 Michigan	Wrigley Field; Chicago, IL (George Jewett Trophy, Big Noon Kickoff)	FOX	L 22–24	38,223
November 22	11:00 a.m.	Minnesota	Wrigley Field; Chicago, IL	BTN	W 38–35	15,323
November 29	6:30 p.m.	at Illinois	Gies Memorial Stadium; Champaign, IL (rivalry)	FOX	L 13–20	53,317
December 26	12:00 p.m.	vs. Central Michigan*	Ford Field; Detroit, MI (GameAbove Sports Bowl)	ESPN	W 34–7	27,857
*Non-conference game; ^{†}Homecoming; Rankings from AP Poll (and CFP Rankings, after November 4) - Released prior to game; All times are in Central time; Source:

== Game summaries ==
=== at Tulane ===
Northwestern Wildcats (0–0) at Tulane Green Wave (0–0) – Game summary

Quarter	1	2	3	4	Total
Wildcats	3	0	0	0	3
Green Wave	7	13	3	0	23

at Yulman Stadium • New Orleans, Louisiana

- Date: August 30
- Game time: 11:00 AM CDT
- Game attendance: 22,103
- Referee: Gregory Blum
- TV announcers (ESPNU): Matt Schumacker (play-by-play) and Dustin Fox (analyst)

Game information

First quarter

- TULN – Justyn Reid 1-yard pass from Jake Retzlaff (Patrick Durkin kick), 10:27. Green Wave 7–0. Drive: 8 plays, 51 yards, 2:54.
- NU – Luke Akers 21-yard field goal, 0:40. Green Wave 7–3. Drive: 13 plays, 69 yards, 7:35.

Second quarter

- TULN – Patrick Durkin 22-yard field goal, 11:07. Green Wave 10–3. Drive: 11 plays, 77 yards, 4:28.
- TULN – Patrick Durkin 41-yard field goal, 5:18. Green Wave 13–3. Drive: 11 plays, 18 yards, 5:03.
- TULN – Jake Retzlaff 69-yard run (Patrick Durkin kick), 1:28. Green Wave 20–3. Drive: 2 plays, 87 yards, 0:24.

Third quarter

- TULN – Patrick Durkin 31-yard field goal, 7:22. Green Wave 23–3. Drive: 16 plays, 62 yards, 7:38.

Fourth quarter

- No scoring plays.

Statistics	NU	TULN
First downs	19	23
Plays–yards	63–237	58–421
Rushes–yards	27–76	40–269
Passing yards	161	152
Passing: comp–att–int	19–36–4	18–31–0
Turnovers	5	0
Time of possession	26:39	33:21

Team	Category	Player	Statistics
Northwestern	Passing	Preston Stone	19/36, 161 yards, 4 INT
Northwestern	Rushing	Cam Porter	6 carries, 46 yards
Northwestern	Receiving	Griffin Wilde	6 receptions, 64 yards
Tulane	Passing	Jake Retzlaff	18/31, 152 yards, TD
Tulane	Rushing	Jake Retzlaff	10 carries, 113 yards, TD
Tulane	Receiving	Omari Hayes	9 receptions, 74 yards

=== vs Western Illinois (FCS) ===
Western Illinois Leathernecks (FCS) (0–1) at Northwestern Wildcats (0–1) – Game summary

Quarter	1	2	3	4	Total
Leathernecks (FCS)	0	0	0	7	7
Wildcats	15	7	6	14	42

at Martin Stadium • Evanston, IL

- Date: September 5
- Game time: 6:30 p.m.
- Game weather: Cloudy 65 °F (18 °C)
- Game attendance: 9,647
- Referee: Jeremy Valentine
- TV announcers (BTN): Lisa Byington (play-by-play), Matt Millen (analyst), and Kylen Mills (sideline reporter)

Game information

First quarter

- (11:58) NU – Cam Porter 43-yard run (Luke Akers kick). Northwestern 7–0. Drive: 6 plays, 30 yards, 3:02
- (6:44) NU – Hayden Eligon II 5-yard pass from Preston Stone (Lawson Albright run). Northwestern 15–0. Drive: 5 plays, 73 yards, 3:09

Second quarter

- (0:28) NU – Hunter Welcing 6-yard pass from Preston Stone (Luke Akers kick). Northwestern 22–0. Drive: 13 plays, 77 yards, 3:34

Third quarter

- (7:06) NU – Luke Akers 35-yard field goal. Northwestern: 25–0. Drive: 9 plays, 53 yards, 4:13
- (1:40) NU – Luke Akers 25-yard field goal. Northwestern: 28–0. Drive: 7 plays, 64 yards, 4:17

Fourth quarter

- (10:43) NU – Drew Wagner 4-yard pass from Preston Stone (Jack Olsen kick). Northwestern 35–0. Drive: 10 plays, 53 yards, 5:27
- (7:07) NU – Ryan Boe 58-yard run (Jack Olsen kick). Northwestern 42–0. Drive: 3 plays, 67 yards, 1:32
- (2:47) WIU – Christian Anaya 8-yard pass from Cason Carswell (Antonio Chadha kick). Northwestern 42–7. Drive: 10 plays, 67 yards, 4:20

Statistics	WIU	NU
First downs	10	24
Plays–yards	50–181	70–526
Rushes–yards	23–71	41–281
Passing yards	110	245
Passing: Comp–Att–Int	12–27–1	21–29–0
Turnovers	1	1
Time of possession	24:06	35:54

Team	Category	Player	Statistics
Western Illinois	Passing	Cason Carswell	6/8, 52 yards, TD
Western Illinois	Rushing	Markell Holman	13 carries, 52 yards
Western Illinois	Receiving	Demari Davis	3 receptions, 46 yards
Northwestern	Passing	Preston Stone	21/29, 245 yards, 3 TD
Northwestern	Rushing	Cam Porter	12 carries, 91 yards, TD
Northwestern	Receiving	Griffin Wilde	5 receptions, 94 yards

=== vs No. 4 Oregon ===
No. 4 Oregon Ducks (2–0) at Northwestern Wildcats (1–1) – Game summary

Quarter	1	2	3	4	Total
No. 4 Ducks	7	10	14	3	34
Wildcats	0	0	0	14	14

at Martin Stadium • Evanston, Illinois

- Date: September 13
- Game time: 11:00 a.m.
- Game weather: Cloudy • Temperature: 67 °F (19 °C) • Wind: SE at 15 miles per hour (24 km/h)
- Game attendance: 12,023
- Referee: Jason Nickleby
- TV announcers (FOX): Gus Johnson (play-by-play), Joel Klatt (analyst), and Jenny Taft (sideline reporter)

Game information

First quarter

- (2:18) ORE – Jayden Limar 1-yard run, Atticus Sappington kick (Drive: 5 plays, 23 yards, 2:37; ORE 7-0)

Second quarter

- (9:28) ORE – Atticus Sappington 42-yard field goal (Drive: 12 plays, 56 yards, 6:03; ORE 10-0)
- (0:31) ORE – Kenyon Sadiq 24-yard pass from Dante Moore, Atticus Sappington kick (Drive: 11 plays, 89 yards, 4:20; ORE 17-0)

Third quarter

- (7:44) ORE – Dierre Hill Jr. 66-yard run, Atticus Sappington kick (Drive: 1 plays, 66 yards, 0:12; ORE 24-0)
- (2:56) ORE – Jordon Davison 2-yard run, Atticus Sappington kick (Drive: 4 plays, 35 yards, 2:22; ORE 31-0)

Fourth quarter

- (11:27) ORE – Atticus Sappington 25-yard field goal (Drive: 4 plays, 5 yards, 1:24; ORE 34-0)
- (6:20) NU – Caleb Komolafe 1-yard run, Jack Olsen kick (Drive: 9 plays, 75 yards, 5:07; ORE 34-7)
- (1:48) NU – Dashun Reeder 79-yard run, Jack Olsen kick (Drive: 3 plays, 91 yards, 1:13; ORE 34-14)

Statistics	ORE	NU
First downs	21	15
Plays–yards	56–373	59–313
Rushes–yards	30–176	37–178
Passing yards	197	135
Passing: comp–att–int	19–26–1	11–22–2
Turnovers	1	2
Time of possession	27:42	32:18

Team	Category	Player	Statistics
Oregon	Passing	Dante Moore	16/20, 178 yards, TD, INT
Oregon	Rushing	Dierre Hill Jr.	5 carries, 94 yards, TD
Oregon	Receiving	Malik Benson	4 receptions, 62 yards
Northwestern	Passing	Preston Stone	11/21, 135 yards, 2 INT
Northwestern	Rushing	Dashun Reeder	1 carry, 79 yards, TD
Northwestern	Receiving	Griffin Wilde	4 receptions, 55 yards

=== vs UCLA ===
UCLA Bruins (0–3) at Northwestern Wildcats (1–2) – Game summary

Quarter	1	2	3	4	Total
Bruins	0	3	3	8	14
Wildcats	3	14	0	0	17

at Martin Stadium • Evanston, Illinois

- Date: September 27
- Game time: 2:30 p.m.
- Game weather: Sunny • Temperature: 83 °F (28 °C) • Wind: NE at 6 miles per hour (9.7 km/h)
- Game attendance: 12,023
- Referee: Francisco Villar
- TV announcers (BTN): Jeff Levering (play-by-play), Jake Butt (analyst), and Brooke Fletcher (sideline reporter)

Game information

First quarter

- NU – Jack Olsen 33-yard field goal, 2:20. Wildcats 3–0. Drive: 17 plays, 74 yards, 9:09.

Second quarter

- NU – Caleb Komolafe 9-yard run (Jack Olsen kick), 13:29. Wildcats 10–0. Drive: 6 plays, 69 yards, 2:57.
- NU – Griffin Wilde 10-yard pass from Preston Stone (Jack Olsen kick), 3:33. Wildcats 17–0. Drive: 5 plays, 64 yards, 2:46.
- UCLA – Mateen Bhaghani 28-yard field goal, 0:00. Wildcats 17–3. Drive: 13 plays, 73 yards, 3:26.

Third quarter

- UCLA – Mateen Bhaghani 25-yard field goal, 2:49. Wildcats 17–6. Drive: 12 plays, 73 yards, 6:12.

Fourth quarter

- UCLA – Kwazi Gilmer 29-yard pass from Nico Iamaleava (Nico Iamaleava–Anthony Woods pass), 6:19. Wildcats 17–14. Drive: 5 plays, 80 yards, 1:29.

Statistics	UCLA	NU
First downs	21	18
Plays–yards	63–314	60–311
Rushes–yards	42–199	30–131
Passing yards	115	180
Passing: comp–att–int	12–18–0	19–27–0
Turnovers	0	0
Time of possession	34:21	25:39

Team	Category	Player	Statistics
UCLA	Passing	Nico Iamaleava	19/27, 180 yards, TD
UCLA	Rushing	Nico Iamaleava	14 carries, 65 yards
UCLA	Receiving	Kwazi Gilmer	3 receptions, 51 yards, TD
Northwestern	Passing	Preston Stone	12/18, 115 yards, TD
Northwestern	Rushing	Caleb Komolafe	27 carries, 119 yards, TD
Northwestern	Receiving	Griffin Wilde	7 receptions, 98 yards, TD

=== vs Louisiana–Monroe ===
Louisiana–Monroe Warhawks (3–1) at Northwestern Wildcats (2–2) – Game summary

Quarter	1	2	3	4	Total
Warhawks	7	0	0	0	7
Wildcats	7	11	21	3	42

at Martin Stadium • Evanston, Illinois

- Date: October 4
- Game time: 2:30 p.m.
- Game weather: Sunny
- Game attendance: 12,023
- Referee: Tim O'Dey
- TV announcers (BTN): Jack Kizer (play-by-play), Anthony Herron (analyst), and Dannie Rogers (sideline reporter)

Game information

First quarter

- (10:47) ULM – Nic Trujillo 34-yard pass from Aidan Armenta, Luke Stagg kick (Drive: 7 plays, 75 yards, 4:13; Louisiana-Monroe 7-0)
- (5:22) NU – Caleb Komolafe 3-yard run, Jack Olsen kick (Drive: 13 plays, 61 yards, 5:19; 7-7)

Second quarter

- (13:57) NU – Hayden Eligon II 37-yard pass from Preston Stone, Lawson Albright run for two-point conversion (Drive: 8 plays, 73 yards, 2:40; Northwestern 15-7)
- (2:00) NU – Jack Olsen 34-yard field goal (Drive: 14 plays, 62 yards, 7:47; Northwestern 18-7)

Third quarter

- (12:04) NU – Caleb Komolafe 39-yard run, Jack Olsen kick (Drive: 7 plays, 63 yards, 2:53; Northwestern 25-7)
- (5:12) NU – Griffin Wilde 49-yard pass from Preston Stone, Jack Olsen kick (Drive: 6 plays, 91 yards, 3:31; Northwestern 32-7)
- (0:16) NU – Drew Wagner 6-yard pass from Preston Stone, Jack Olsen kick (Drive: 9 plays, 53 yards, 4:04; Northwestern 39-7)

Fourth quarter

- (8:43) NU – Jack Olsen 33-yard field goal (Drive: 7 plays, 30 yards, 4:07; Northwestern 42-7)

Statistics	ULM	NU
First downs	18	26
Plays–yards	53–273	71–515
Rushes–yards	30–87	38–246
Passing yards	186	269
Passing: comp–att–int	12-23-0	21–33–0
Turnovers	0	0
Time of possession	24:18	35:42

Team	Category	Player	Statistics
Louisiana–Monroe	Passing	Aidan Armenta	10/19, 129 yards, TD
Louisiana–Monroe	Rushing	Braylon McReynolds	8 carries, 49 yards
Louisiana–Monroe	Receiving	Nic Trujillo	2 receptions, 61 yards, TD
Northwestern	Passing	Preston Stone	20/31, 262 yards, 3 TD
Northwestern	Rushing	Dashun Reeder	11 carries, 79 yards
Northwestern	Receiving	Hayden Eligon II	3 receptions, 80 yards, TD

=== at Penn State ===
Northwestern Wildcats (3–2) at Penn State Nittany Lions (3–2) – Game summary

Quarter	1	2	3	4	Total
Wildcats	3	10	0	9	22
Nittany Lions	0	14	0	7	21

at Beaver Stadium • University Park, Pennsylvania

- Date: October 11
- Game time: 2:30 p.m.
- Game weather: 63 °F (17 °C) • Mostly cloudy
- Referee: Mark Kluczynski
- TV announcers (FS1): Connor Onion (play-by-play) and Mark Helfrich (color commentator)
- ESPN box score

Game information

First quarter

- NU – Jack Olsen 27-yard field goal, 2:51. Wildcats 3–0. Drive: 12 plays, 58 yards, 7:23.

Second quarter

- PSU – Kaytron Allen 11-yard run (Ryan Barker kick), 11:40. Nittany Lions 7–3. Drive: 12 plays, 87 yards, 6:11.
- NU – Griffin Wilde 29-yard pass from Preston Stone (Jack Olsen kick), 7:14. Wildcats 10–7. Drive: 8 plays, 75 yards, 4:26.
- PSU – Nicholas Singleton 2-yard run (Ryan Barker kick), 1:19. Nittany Lions 14–10. Drive: 9 plays, 26 yards, 4:20.
- NU – Jack Olsen 34-yard field goal, 0:03. Nittany Lions 14–13. Drive: 12 plays, 59 yards, 1:16.

Third quarter

- No scoring plays.

Fourth quarter

- NU – Jack Olsen 41-yard field goal, 14:08. Wildcats 16–14. Drive: 4 plays, -14 yards, 1:22.
- PSU – Drew Allar 1-yard run (Ryan Barker kick), 10:50. Nittany Lions 21–16. Drive: 6 plays, 91 yards, 3:14.
- NU – Caleb Komolafe 9-yard run (run failed), 4:51. Wildcats 22–21. Drive: 12 plays, 75 yards, 5:54.

Statistics	NU	PSU
First downs	23	13
Plays–yards	68–282	51–274
Rushes–yards	42–119	31–137
Passing yards	163	137
Passing: comp–att–int	17–26–0	13–20–1
Turnovers	1	2
Time of possession	34:46	25:14

Team	Category	Player	Statistics
Northwestern	Passing	Preston Stone	17/26, 163 yards, TD
Northwestern	Rushing	Caleb Komolafe	19 carries, 72 yards TD
Northwestern	Receiving	Griffin Wilde	7 receptions, 94 yards, TD
Penn State	Passing	Drew Allar	13/20, 137 yards, INT
Penn State	Rushing	Kaytron Allen	16 carries, 90 yards, TD
Penn State	Receiving	Devonte Ross	7 receptions, 115 yards

=== vs Purdue ===
Purdue Boilermakers (2–4) at Northwestern Wildcats (4–2) – Game summary

Quarter	1	2	3	4	Total
Boilermakers	0	0	0	0	0
Wildcats	3	10	6	0	19

at Martin Stadium • Evanston, Illinois

- Date: October 18
- Game time: 2:00 p.m.
- Game weather: Cloudy
- Game attendance: 12,023
- Referee: Kole Kneuppel
- TV announcers (BTN): Guy Haberman (play-by-play), Yogi Roth (analyst) and Rhett Lewis (sideline)

Game information

First quarter

- (0:03) NU – Jack Olsen 27-yard field goal (Drive: 14 plays, 66 yards, 7:15; Northwestern 3-0)

Second quarter

- (13:13) NU – Hunter Welcing 3-yard pass from Preston Stone, Jack Olsen kick (Drive: 14 plays, 74 yards, 8:10; Northwestern 10-0)
- (8:38) NU – Jack Olsen 38-yard field goal (Drive: 7 plays, 60 yards, 2:04; Northwestern 13-0)

Third quarter

- (4:01) NU – Griffin Wilde 12-yard pass from Preston Stone, two-point pass conversion failed (Drive: 12 plays, 76 yards, 7:34; Northwestern 19-0)

Fourth quarter

- No scoring plays.

Statistics	PUR	NU
First downs	11	24
Plays–yards	56–305	76–364
Rushes–yards	26–87	50–232
Passing yards	218	132
Passing: comp–att–int	16-30-1	11–26–1
Turnovers	3	2
Time of possession	22:21	37:39

Team	Category	Player	Statistics
Purdue	Passing	Malachi Singleton	11/20, 187 yards, INT
Purdue	Rushing	Malachi Thomas	7 carries, 34 yards
Purdue	Receiving	Devin Mockobee	2 receptions, 52 yards
Northwestern	Passing	Preston Stone	11/26, 132 yards, 2 TD, INT
Northwestern	Rushing	Joseph Himon II	22 carries, 87 yards
Northwestern	Receiving	Griffin Wilde	4 receptions, 47 yards, TD

=== at Nebraska ===
Northwestern Wildcats (5–2) at Nebraska Cornhuskers (5–2) – Game summary

Quarter	1	2	3	4	Total
Wildcats	3	3	7	8	21
Cornhuskers	7	0	14	7	28

at Memorial Stadium • Lincoln, Nebraska

- Date: October 25
- Game time: 11:00 a.m.
- Game weather: Cloudy, 55 degrees, Wind SE @ 8 mph
- Game attendance: 86,401
- Referee: Gregory Blum
- TV announcers (FS1): Connor Onion (play-by-play) and Mark Helfrich (analyst)

Game information

First Quarter

- (7:49) NEB - Emmett Johnson 9-yard run, Kyle Cunanan kick (Drive: 9 plays, 69 yards, 4:02, Nebraska 7-0)
- (3:28) NW - Jack Olsen 40-yard field goal (Drive: 9 plays, 53 yards, 4:21, Nebraska 7-3)

Second Quarter

- (3:01) NW - Jack Olsen 25-yard field goal (Drive: 15 plays, 67 yards, 7:43, Nebraska 7-6)

Third Quarter

- (14:47) NEB - Kenneth Williams 95-yard kickoff return, Kyle Cunanan kick (Nebraska 14-6)
- (7:39) NEB - Nyziah Hunter 12-yard pass from Dylan Raiola, Kyle Cunanan kick (Drive: 3 plays, 32 yards, 0:58, Nebraska 21-6)
- (2:25) NW - Caleb Komolafe 4-yard run, Jack Olsen kick (Drive: 9 plays, 78 yards, 5:08, Nebraska 21-13)

Fourth Quarter

- (11:16) NW - Caleb Komolafe 56-yard run, Hayden Eligon II 2-point PAT pass from Preston Stone (Drive: 4 plays, 80 yards, 2:13, 21-21)
- (2:44) NEB - Emmett Johnson 4-yard run, Kyle Cunanan kick (Drive: 13 plays, 64 yards, 6:27, Nebraska 28-21)

Statistics	NU	NEB
First downs	18	18
Plays–yards	59–331	61–296
Rushes–yards	30–172	39–155
Passing yards	159	141
Passing: comp–att–int	15–29–2	16–22–1
Turnovers	2	2
Time of possession	29:44	30:16

Team	Category	Player	Statistics
Northwestern	Passing	Preston Stone	15/29, 159 yards, 2 INT
Northwestern	Rushing	Caleb Komolafe	17 carries, 125 yards, 2 TD
Northwestern	Receiving	Griffin Wilde	3 receptions, 54 yards
Nebraska	Passing	Dylan Raiola	16/22, 141 yards, TD, INT
Nebraska	Rushing	Emmett Johnson	27 carries, 124 yards, 2 TD
Nebraska	Receiving	Nyziah Hunter	6 receptions, 70 yards, TD

=== at No. 19 USC ===
Northwestern Wildcats (5–3) at No. 19 USC Trojans (6–2) – Game summary

Quarter	1	2	3	4	Total
Wildcats	7	7	3	0	17
No. 19 Trojans	7	14	7	10	38

at Los Angeles Memorial Coliseum • Los Angeles, California

- Date: November 7
- Game time: 8:00 p.m.
- Game weather: 68 °F (20 °C), clear • Wind: 5 miles per hour (8.0 km/h)
- Game attendance: 67,179
- Referee: Mark Kluczynski
- TV announcers (FOX): Jason Benetti (play-by-play), Robert Griffin III (analyst), and Alexa Landestoy (sideline reporter)

Game information

First quarter

- (7:46) USC – Makai Lemon 7-yard pass from Jayden Maiava, Ryon Sayeri kick (Drive: 16 plays, 82 yards, 7:14; USC 7–0)
- (0:45) NU – Griffin Wilde 4-yard pass from Preston Stone, Jack Olsen kick (Drive: 13 plays, 75 yards, 7:01; Tied 7–7)

Second quarter

- (11:27) USC – Jayden Maiava 6-yard run, Ryon Sayeri kick (Drive: 9 plays, 58 yards, 4:12; USC 14–7)
- (7:26) NU – Caleb Komolafe 2-yard run, Jack Olsen kick (Drive: 7 plays, 75 yards, 4:01; Tied 14–14)
- (1:24) USC – King Miller 12-yard run, Ryon Sayeri kick (Drive: 3 plays, 80 yards, 1:23; USC 21–14)

Third quarter

- (7:56) USC – Ja'Kobi Lane 10-yard pass from Jayden Maiava, Ryon Sayeri kick (Drive: 8 plays, 91 yards, 4:12; USC 28–14)
- (0:17) NU – Jack Olsen 33-yard field goal (Drive: 12 plays, 60 yards, 7:39; USC 28–17)

Fourth quarter

- (11:14) USC – Makai Lemon 4-yard run, Ryon Sayeri kick (Drive: 7 plays, 75 yards, 4:03; USC 35–17)
- (4:40) USC – Ryon Sayeri 22-yard field goal (Drive: 8 plays, 49 yards, 4:39; USC 38–17)

Statistics	NU	USC
First downs	13	24
Plays–yards	55–280	64–482
Rushes–yards	25–130	30–173
Passing yards	150	309
Passing: comp–att–int	20–30-0	25–34–1
Turnovers	2	1
Time of possession	27:24	32:36

Team	Category	Player	Statistics
Northwestern	Passing	Preston Stone	20/30, 150 yards, TD
Northwestern	Rushing	Caleb Komolafe	17 carries, 118 yards, TD
Northwestern	Receiving	Caleb Komolafe	5 receptions, 40 yards
USC	Passing	Jayden Maiava	24/33, 299 yards, 2 TD, INT
USC	Rushing	King Miller	15 carries, 127 yards, TD
USC	Receiving	Makai Lemon	11 receptions, 161 yards, TD

=== vs No. 18 Michigan (George Jewett Trophy) ===
No. 18 Michigan Wolverines (7–2) at Northwestern Wildcats (5–4) – Game summary

Quarter	1	2	3	4	Total
No. 18 Wolverines	0	7	14	3	24
Wildcats	0	6	3	13	22

at Wrigley Field • Chicago, Illinois

- Date: November 15
- Game time: 11:00 a.m.
- Game weather: 66 °F (19 °C), cloudy, SW 15 miles per hour (24 km/h)
- Game attendance: 38,223
- Referee: Tim ODey
- TV announcers (FOX): Gus Johnson (play-by-play), Joel Klatt (analyst), and Jenny Taft (sideline)

Game information

First quarter

- No scoring plays.

Second quarter

- (13:11) MICH - Jordan Marshall 1-yard run (Dominic Zvada kick) (Drive: 12 plays, 91 yards, 5:45; MICH 7–0)
- (5:22) NW - Jack Olsen 34-yard field goal (Drive: 10 plays, 38 yards, 5:50; MICH 7–3)
- (1:00) NW - Jack Olsen 26-yard field goal (Drive: 7 plays, 39 yards, 1:18; MICH 7–6)

Third quarter

- (10:29) MICH - Bryce Underwood 9-yard run (Dominic Zvada kick) (Drive: 5 plays, 85 yards, 2:13; MICH 14–6)
- (6:09) NW - Jack Olsen 35-yard field goal (Drive: 6 plays, 19 yards, 3:08; MICH 14–9)
- (0:41) MICH - Jordan Marshall 1-yard run (Dominic Zvada kick) (Drive: 10 plays, 80 yards, 5:23; MICH 21–9)

Fourth quarter

- (13:00) NW - Preston Stone 1-yard run (Jack Olsen kick) (Drive: 7 plays, 75 yards, 2:40; MICH 21–16)
- (12:05) NW - Caleb Komolafe 6-yard run (pass failed) (Drive: 1 play, 6 yards, 0:05; NW 22–21)
- (0:00) MICH - Dominic Zvada 31-yard field goal (Drive: 11 plays, 50 yards, 2:10; MICH 24–22)

Statistics	MICH	NU
First downs	25	11
Plays–yards	77–496	53–245
Rushes–yards	45–216	26–61
Passing yards	280	184
Passing: comp–att–int	21–32–2	13–27–0
Turnovers	5	0
Time of possession	33:06	26:53

Team	Category	Player	Statistics
Michigan	Passing	Bryce Underwood	21/32, 280 yards, 2 INT
Michigan	Rushing	Jordan Marshall	19 carries, 142 yards, 2 TD
Michigan	Receiving	Andrew Marsh	12 receptions, 189 yards
Northwestern	Passing	Preston Stone	13/27, 184 yards
Northwestern	Rushing	Caleb Komolafe	12 carries, 31 yards, TD
Northwestern	Receiving	Hunter Welcing	4 receptions, 81 yards

=== vs Minnesota ===
Minnesota Golden Gophers (6–4) at Northwestern Wildcats (5–5) – Game summary

Quarter	1	2	3	4	Total
Golden Gophers	0	21	7	7	35
Wildcats	10	3	15	10	38

at Wrigley Field • Chicago, Illinois

- Date: November 22
- Game time: 11:00 a.m. CST
- Game weather:
- Game attendance: 15,323
- Referee: Jeff Servinski
- TV announcers (BTN): Jack Kizer (play-by-play), Matt Millen (analyst) and Sydney Supple (sideline)

Game information

First quarter

- NU – Caleb Komolafe 46-yard run (Jack Olsen kick), 12:05. Wildcats 7–0. Drive: 6 plays, 75 yards, 2:55.
- NU – Jack Olsen 34-yard field goal, 0:51. Wildcats 10–0. Drive: 15 plays, 51 yards, 8:43.

Second quarter

- MINN – Darius Taylor 1-yard run (Brady Denaburg kick), 13:35. Wildcats 10–7. Drive: 4 plays, 5 yards, 2:02.
- NU – Jack Olsen 35-yard field goal, 7:38. Wildcats 13–7. Drive: 10 plays, 58 yards, 5:50.
- MINN – Javon Tracy 5-yard pass from Drake Lindsey (Brady Denaburg kick), 3:09. Golden Gophers 14–13. Drive: 11 plays, 75 yards, 4:29.
- MINN – Javon Tracy 24-yard pass from Drake Lindsey (Brady Denaburg kick), 0:12. Golden Gophers 21–13. Drive: 8 plays, 62 yards, 1:48.

Third quarter

- MINN – Javon Tracy 28-yard pass from Drake Lindsey (Brady Denaburg kick), 12:43. Golden Gophers 28–13. Drive: 1 play, 28 yards, 0:09.
- NU – Griffin Wilde 4-yard pass from Preston Stone (Henry Helms–Robby Preckel pass), 7:01. Golden Gophers 28–21. Drive: 9 plays, 79 yards, 5:37.
- NU – Joseph Himmon II 20-yard run (Jack Olsen kick), 0:28. Tied 28–28. Drive: 7 plays, 70 yards, 4:14.

Fourth quarter

- NU – Caleb Komolafe 2-yard pass from Preston Stone (Jack Olsen kick), 10:20. Wildcats 35–28. Drive: 8 plays, 70 yards, 4:29.
- MINN – Le'Meke Brockington 8-yard pass from Drake Lindsey (Brady Denaburg kick), 8:20. Tied 35–35. Drive: 6 plays, 75 yards, 2:00.
- NU – Jack Olsen 33-yard field goal, 0:53. Wildcats 38–35. Drive: 14 plays, 59 yards, 7:27.

Statistics	MINN	NU
First downs	15	25
Plays–yards	48–323	70–525
Rushes–yards	17–59	39–220
Passing yards	264	305
Passing: comp–att–int	20–31–0	25–31–0
Turnovers	0	1
Time of possession	19:12	40:48

Team	Category	Player	Statistics
Minnesota	Passing	Drake Lindsey	20/30, 264 yards, 4 TD
Minnesota	Rushing	Darius Taylor	10 carries, 43 yards, TD
Minnesota	Receiving	Javon Tracy	4 receptions, 87 yards, 3 TD
Northwestern	Passing	Preston Stone	25/30, 305 yards, 2 TD
Northwestern	Rushing	Caleb Komolafe	22 carries, 129 yards, TD
Northwestern	Receiving	Hayden Eligon II	7 receptions, 127 yards

=== at Illinois (rivalry) ===
Northwestern Wildcats (6–5) at Illinois Fighting Illini (7–4) – Game summary

Quarter	1	2	3	4	Total
Wildcats	3	7	0	3	13
Fighting Illini	0	14	3	3	20

at Gies Memorial Stadium • Champaign, Illinois

- Date: November 29
- Game time: 6:30 p.m.
- Game weather:
- Game attendance: 53,317
- Referee: Chris Coyte
- TV announcers (FOX): Connor Onion (play-by-play) and Mark Helfrich (analyst)

Game information

First quarter

- NU – Jack Olsen 38-yard field goal, 0:16. Wildcats 3–0. Drive: 15 plays, 63 yards, 9:18.

Second quarter

- ILL – Ca'Lil Valentine 6-yard run (David Olano kick), 11:27. Fighting Illini 7–3. Drive: 7 plays, 83 yards, 3:43.
- NU – Hayden Eligon II 13-yard pass from Preston Stone (Jack Olsen kick), 5:50. Wildcats 10–7. Drive: 10 plays, 75 yards, 5:37.
- ILL – Kaden Feagin 1-yard run (David Olano kick), 0:30. Fighting Illini 14–10. Drive: 4 plays, 48 yards, 1:09.

Third quarter

- ILL – David Olano 47-yard field goal, 7:23. Fighting Illini 17–10. Drive: 9 plays, 41 yards, 6:02.

Fourth quarter

- NU – Jack Olsen 26-yard field goal, 7:46. Fighting Illini 17–13. Drive: 4 plays, -7 yards, 1:36.
- ILL – David Olano 27-yard field goal, 3:00. Fighting Illini 20–13. Drive: 4 plays, 9 yards, 2:19.

Statistics	NU	ILL
First downs	19	14
Plays–yards	65-254	52-284
Rushes–yards	29-91	36-120
Passing yards	163	164
Passing: comp–att–int	19-36-3	11-16-0
Turnovers	4	1
Time of possession	30:34	29:26

Team	Category	Player	Statistics
Northwestern	Passing	Preston Stone	19/36, 163 yards, TD, 3 INT
Northwestern	Rushing	Robby Preckel	22 carries, 82 yards
Northwestern	Receiving	Hayden Eligon II	8 receptions, 99 yards, TD
Illinois	Passing	Luke Altmyer	10/15, 136 yards
Illinois	Rushing	Ca'Lil Valentine	14 carries, 74 yards, TD
Illinois	Receiving	Collin Dixon	2 receptions, 53 yards

=== vs. Central Michigan (GameAbove Sports Bowl) ===
2025 GameAbove Sports Bowl
Central Michigan Chippewas (7–5) vs. Northwestern Wildcats (6–6) – Game summary

Quarter	1	2	3	4	Total
Chippewas	0	0	0	7	7
Wildcats	0	21	13	0	34

at Ford Field • Detroit, MI

- Date: December 26
- Game time: 12:00 PM CST
- Game attendance: 27,857
- Referee: Ted Pittz
- TV announcers (ESPN): Matt Schumacker (play-by-play), Dustin Fox (analyst) and Ashley Stroehlein (sideline)

Game information

First quarter

- No scoring plays.

Second quarter

- NU – Griffin Wilde 23-yard pass from Preston Stone (Jack Olsen kick), 6:33. Wildcats 7–0. Drive: 3 plays, 29 yards, 1:28.
- NU – Caleb Komolafe 2-yard run (Jack Olsen kick), 3:43. Wildcats 14–0. Drive: 6 plays, 16 yards, 2:41.
- NU – Lawson Albright 23-yard pass from Preston Stone (Jack Olsen kick), 3:31. Wildcats 21–0. Drive: 1 play, 23 yards, 0:07.

Third quarter

- NU – Braden Turner 47-yard fumble return (Jack Olsen kick failed), 12:39. Wildcats 27–0.
- NU – Griffin Wilde 11-yard pass from Preston Stone (Jack Olsen kick), 2:31. Wildcats 34–0. Drive: 10 plays, 92 yards, 5:23.

Fourth quarter

- CMU – Brock Townsend 3-yard pass from Joe Labas (Cade Graham kick), 6:11. Wildcats 34–7. Drive: 10 plays, 86 yards, 5:49.

Statistics	CMU	NU
First downs	15	18
Plays–yards	60–269	61–313
Rushes–yards	34–91	26–77
Passing yards	178	236
Passing: Comp–Att–Int	21-26-1	20-35-1
Turnovers	4	1
Time of possession	32:42	27:18

Team	Category	Player	Statistics
Central Michigan	Passing	Joe Labas	21/25, 178 yards, TD
Central Michigan	Rushing	Trey Cornist	11 carries, 66 yards
Central Michigan	Receiving	Langston Lewis	8 receptions, 83 yards
Northwestern	Passing	Preston Stone	19/31, 226 yards, 3 TD
Northwestern	Rushing	Caleb Komolafe	15 carries, 55 yards, TD
Northwestern	Receiving	Griffin Wilde	10 receptions, 97 yards, 2 TD

== Roster ==
2025 Northwestern Wildcats football team roster
Players
Coaches
Offense

Pos.	#	Name	Class
QB	2	Ryan Boe	Fr
WR	3	Frank Covey IV	So
RB	4	Cam Porter	GS
RB	5	Caleb Komolafe	So
RB	6	Joseph Himon II	Jr
QB	8	Preston Stone	GS
WR	10	Ricky Amumaraeze	So
QB	12	Marcus Romaine	Fr
QB	13	Gavin Frakes	Jr
WR	14	Dube Enongene	Fr
QB	15	Sean Winton	Fr
WR	16	Brennan Saxe	Fr
WR	17	Griffin Wilde	Jr
TE	18	Camp Magee	So
WR	19	Drew Wagner	So
WR	20	Chase Ferrell	Fr
RB	24	Dashun Reeder	Fr
RB	26	Albert Kunickis III	Jr
RB	27	Daniel Anderson	Fr
WR	35	Tate Crane	GS
RB	36	Ronny Johnson	Fr
TE	41	Robby Preckel	Fr
TE	43	Noah LaPorte	Fr
TE	48	Tyler Kielmeyer	Fr
OL	50	Talan Chandler	Fr
OL	57	Hayden Wright	Fr
OL	60	Evan Beerntsen	GS
OL	61	Matt Keeler	GS
OL	62	Ezomo Oratokhai	Fr
OL	63	Xavior Gray	GS
OL	64	Anthony Birsa	So
OL	65	Jackson Carsello	GS
OL	67	Jace Borcherding	Fr
OL	69	Jack Bailey	GS
OL	71	Dennis Rahouski	Fr
OL	72	Caleb Tiernan	GS
OL	73	Deuce McGuire	Jr
OL	74	Nick Herzog	Jr
OL	75	Martes Lewis	GS
OL	76	Michael O'Connell	Fr
OL	77	Idrys Cotton	Fr
OL	78	Trey Boyd	Fr
WR	80	Hayden Eligon II	So
TE	81	Chris Petrucci	Jr
WR	82	Braden Blueitt	Fr
TE	83	Blake Van Buren	Jr
TE	84	Hunter Welcing	GS
TE	85	Patrick Schaller	Fr
TE	86	Lawson Albright	GS
WR	87	Carson Grove	Fr
TE	88	Alex Lines	GS
WR	89	Cam Russell	Fr

Defense

Pos.	#	Name	Class
DB	2	Fred Davis II	GS
DL	4	Anto Saka	Jr
DB	6	Robert Fitzgerald	Jr
DB	7	Ore Adeyi	GS
DB	8	Dillon Tatum	Jr
DB	9	Braden Turner	Jr
DB	11	Seth Valeri	Fr
DB	12	Evan Smith	Jr
DB	13	Josh Fussell	So
LB	14	Yanni Karlaftis	GS
DL	15	Brendan Flakes	So
DB	16	J. J. Lewis	So
DB	18	Garner Wallace	GS
DB	20	Alijah Jones	Fr
DB	21	Damon Walters	So
DB	22	Terrion Curry-Hicks	Fr
DB	23	Cole Shivers	So
DB	25	Marquet Dorsey Jr.	Fr
DB	26	Jalen Lewis	So
DB	27	Jack Oyola	Jr
DB	28	Timi Oke	Fr
DB	29	Jon Jon Stevens	Fr
DB	31	Tito Williams Jr.	Fr
LB	32	Matthew Smith	Fr
LB	33	Braydon Brus	Jr
LB	34	Payton Roth	So
DB	35	Sean Martin	Fr
LB	37	Mac Uihlein	GS
LB	38	Josh Veldman	Fr
LB	40	Jason Reynolds II	Jr
LB	42	Nigel Glover	So
DL	44	Callen Campbell	Fr
LB	45	Jack Sadowsky V	Jr
LB	46	Lincoln Creager	Fr
DL	47	Michael Kilbain	Jr
LB	51	Miles Crutchley	Jr
DL	52	Richie Hagarty	GS
DL	53	Tanner Jumpp	Fr
DL	54	Tyler Gant	So
DL	55	Dylan Roberts	So
DL	56	Mason Mayne	Fr
LB	58	Nathaniel Campbell	GS
DL	59	Jack Trautmann	Fr
DL	90	Carmine Bastone	GS
DL	91	Aidan Hubbard	GS
DL	92	Mason Green	So
DL	93	Caden O'Rourke	Fr
DL	94	Miguel Jackson	GS
DL	95	Najee Story	GS
DL	96	Jonah Hayes	Fr
DL	97	Braxton Strong	Fr
DL	98	Landon Lauter	Fr
DL	99	Troy Regovich	Fr

Special teams

Pos.	#	Name	Class
P	11	Luke Akers	GS
LS	39	Jack Florentine	Fr
LS	49	Liam Reardon	GS
K	82	Jack Olsen	GS
P	92	Nikola Dugandzic	Fr
K	94	Henry Helms	So

Head coach

- David Braun

Coordinators/assistant coaches

- Harlon Barnett – Assistant head coach/safeties
- Zach Lujan – Offensive coordinator/quarterbacks
- Tim McGarigle – Defensive coordinator/linebackers
- Paul Creighton – Special teams coordinator/tight ends
- Armon Binns – Wide receivers
- Aristotle Thompson – Running backs
- LaMarcus Hicks – Cornerbacks
- Bill O'Boyle – Offensive linemen
- Christian Smith – Defensive linemen
- D. J. Vokolek – Assistant defense linemen
- Drew Gray – Nickels
- Zach Martin – Assistant quarterbacks
- Zac Krause – Assistant wide receivers
- Jacob White – Assistant linebackers
- Grant O'Brien – Assistant defensive backs
- Jeff Copp – Senior analyst
- Ryan Olson – Run game specialist/offensive assistant
- Joe Seymour – Special teams assistant

Legend

- (C) Team captain
- (S) Suspended
- (I) Ineligible
- Injured
- Redshirt

Roster
