= Noah Oppenheim =

American television producer

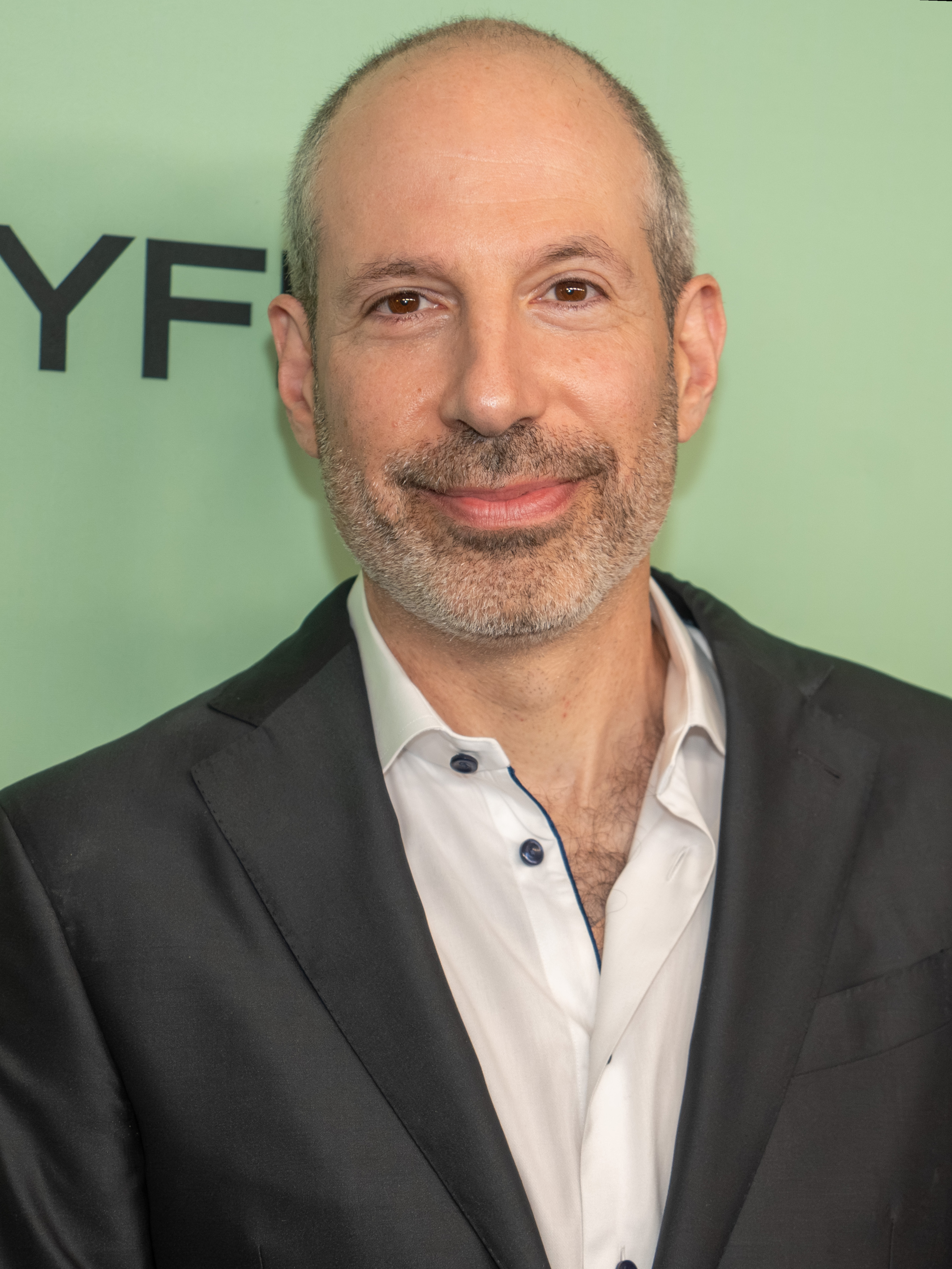
- Oppenheim in 2025
- Born: 1977 or 1978 (age 47–48)
- Education: Harvard University (AB)
- Occupations: Journalist, television producer, author, screenwriter
- Known for: President of NBC News
- Spouse: Allison Oppenheim
- Children: 3

Noah Oppenheim (born 1977 or 1978) is an American television producer, author, and screenwriter. Previously, Oppenheim was the executive in charge and senior producer of NBC's Today Show, where he supervised the 7–8am hour of the broadcast, and head of development at the production company Reveille. He became president of NBC News in 2017. The same year, Ronan Farrow claimed that Oppenheim attempted to stop his reporting on the Harvey Weinstein sexual abuse cases, a claim that Oppenheim denied. Oppenheim stepped down as president of NBC News in January 2023 and entered into a film and TV production agreement with NBCUniversal.

== Early life ==
Oppenheim was born to a Jewish family of Ashkenazi descent, the son of Marcia (née Nusbaum) and Jay Oppenheim. He attended The Gregory School in Tucson, Arizona, and served as an editor and writer for the school newspaper, the Gregorian Chant. After high school, Oppenheim graduated magna cum laude from Harvard University in 2000. While attending Harvard, Oppenheim was editorial chair of The Harvard Crimson.

== Career ==
=== Writing ===
In October 2006, Oppenheim and David Kidder co-authored the Rodale, Inc. series The Intellectual Devotional. The series’ volume "The Intellectual Devotional, American History" made The New York Times Best Seller list for political books in 2007.

As a screenwriter, Oppenheim wrote the film Jackie, for which he won best screenplay at the 73rd Venice International Film Festival, and co-wrote the scripts for The Maze Runner and The Divergent Series: Allegiant.

In November 2022, Variety reported that Oppenheim and Eric Newman co-wrote a political thriller series in production for Netflix called Zero Day, starring Robert De Niro as a former US president.

In 2024, Oppenheim founded a production company, Prologue Entertainment, with Lloyd Braun and Sarah Bremmer.

Oppenheim wrote the screenplay for the 2025 film A House of Dynamite, directed by Kathryn Bigelow and released on Netflix.

=== Television ===
==== CNBC/MSNBC ====
Oppenheim started his television career at MSNBC in 2001 as a senior producer on Hardball with Chris Matthews. He then became the executive producer of Scarborough Country when it launched in 2003.

Later in 2003, Oppenheim wrote an op-ed criticizing the media's coverage of the Iraq War. NBC Nightly News executive producer Steve Capus and anchor Tom Brokaw complained about an opinion article being written by an NBC-affiliated producer.

He left MSNBC in 2004, returning NBC News in 2005, where he helped create CNBC's Mad Money with Jim Cramer, and worked as the senior producer of The Today Show until 2008.

==== Reveille ====
In 2008, Oppenheim joined Los Angeles entertainment group Reveille as its vice president of development. He oversaw development of various television shows including The Buried Life and It's On with Alexa Chung He left in 2010.

==== NBC News ====
In January 2015, Oppenheim returned to NBC as senior vice president of Today. Oppenheim was made president of NBC News in February 2017.

Under Oppenheim, in May 2019 NBC News launched a streaming service called NBC News Now. In December 2021, Oppenheim said competition was intensifying to become the preferred new streaming service as consumer habits shifted toward dedicated streaming platforms.

In June 2019, Oppenheim was one of three heads of US broadcast news outlets to promise that coverage of the 2020 presidential election cycle to be more in-depth and "nuanced." Oppenheim said NBC News was hiring a large number of journalists to cover the election campaign, including journalists from local papers around the country who were knowledgeable about their region. In August 2020, Oppenheim said NBC News had doubled the number of staff tasked with covering election security and misinformation. But he said he was trying to avoid a "self-fulfilling prophecy of [electoral] chaos and confusion." "Frankly, the well-being of the country depends on us being cautious, disciplined and unassailably correct," he told The New York Times.

During his tenure as president of NBC News, articles and opinion pieces Oppenheim wrote while attending Harvard resurfaced, which raised concerns about the culture Oppenheim is cultivating at NBC and whether it is accommodating to female employees. He has been accused of self-dealing by repeatedly promoting children's books co-authored by his wife on the Today Show.

In 2021, Oppenheim served as executive producer on the NBC News Studios projects The Thing About Pam and Memory Box: Echoes of 9/11.

In March 2022, Oppenheim told Variety that NBC News Studios was launching in the United Kingdom as the first phase of a planned overseas expansion for the streaming service outside of North America, explaining that the UK was chosen in part because it was “a hub of our global news gathering operations.”

On January 11, 2023, NBC said that Oppenheim would be stepping down as president of NBC News and had entered into a film and TV production agreement with NBCUniversal. According to Variety, Oppenheim expanded NBC News during his tenure, including by introducing streaming services, podcasts and digital products based on the morning show Today. He also hired many print journalists for its digital and traditional news operations and “helped steady” the Today show.

==== Controversies ====
In 2019, Ronan Farrow alleged that Oppenheim, while initially supportive of his reporting on the Harvey Weinstein sexual abuse allegations, later participated in efforts by NBC executives to stop investigation efforts by Farrow, ultimately resulting in Farrow's contract not being renewed. Farrow took the story to The New Yorker which published it soon afterwards.

The NBC News organization and Oppenheim were criticized for not publishing the Weinstein story, and later over the news of sexual harassment claims against Matt Lauer. Farrow later alleged that Oppenheim played a major role in refusing to allow NBC News to report on those allegations in 2017. Oppenheim denied Farrow's claim and stated that the reason NBC News chose not to report on the story was that the available evidence did not meet their journalistic standards. However, other accounts of contemporary discussions within NBC News are consistent with Oppenheim preventing NBC journalists from reporting on Weinstein. Oppenheim denied that NBC hid the Matt Lauer accusations over the years and calls Farrow's book a "smear" though many on his staff remain skeptical. Farrow also reported that NBC News hired a "Wikipedia whitewasher" who removed references to NBC's role in the Weinstein case from several Wikipedia articles, including Oppenheim's.

== Personal life ==
Oppenheim is married to Allison Oppenheim. He has three children. He resides in Purchase, New York as of 2016.
