= Prologue Entertainment =

- Industry: Entertainment
- Founded: 2024; 1 year ago
- Founder: Lloyd Braun; Sarah Bremner; Noah Oppenheim
- Headquarters: Los Angeles; New York City, United States

Prologue Entertainment is an American entertainment production company founded by Lloyd Braun, Sarah Bremner, and Noah Oppenheim in 2024.

== History ==
Prologue Entertainment was founded in 2024 as an independent production studio by Braun, Bremner, and Oppenheim following an investment from Jeff Zucker and RedBird Capital Partners. The studio's first film, A House of Dynamite, was released on Netflix in 2025.

In 2025, Prologue and The Atlantic announced that the two would be entering a corporate partnership that would give Prologue first look rights to develop content based on The Atlantic's journalism.

== Filmography ==
=== Film ===
Title	Release Date	Notes
A House of Dynamite	September 2, 2025	

=== Television ===
Title	Years active	Network	Notes	Episodes
Zero Day	2025	Netflix		6
