= A House of Dynamite =

2025 film by Kathryn Bigelow

- Release poster
- Directed by: Kathryn Bigelow
- Written by: Noah Oppenheim
- Produced by: Greg Shapiro; Kathryn Bigelow; Noah Oppenheim
- Starring: Idris Elba; Rebecca Ferguson; Gabriel Basso; Jared Harris; Tracy Letts; Anthony Ramos; Moses Ingram; Jonah Hauer-King; Greta Lee; Jason Clarke
- Cinematography: Barry Ackroyd
- Edited by: Kirk Baxter
- Music by: Volker Bertelmann
- Production companies: First Light; Prologue Entertainment; Kingsgate Films
- Distributed by: Netflix
- Release dates: September 2, 2025 (Venice); October 10, 2025 (United States)
- Running time: 112 minutes
- Country: United States
- Language: English

A House of Dynamite is a 2025 American political thriller film directed by Kathryn Bigelow and written by Noah Oppenheim. The film dramatizes the perspectives and responses of various U.S. government officials, both civilian and military, after an unknown adversary launches an ICBM (intercontinental ballistic missile) at Chicago. It stars an ensemble cast of Idris Elba, Rebecca Ferguson, Gabriel Basso, Jared Harris, Tracy Letts, Anthony Ramos, Moses Ingram, Jonah Hauer-King, Greta Lee, and Jason Clarke.

The film had its world premiere at the 82nd Venice International Film Festival on September 2, 2025, where it competed for the Golden Lion. It was given a limited theatrical release in the United Kingdom on October 3 and in the United States on October 10, before its streaming debut on Netflix on October 24. It received positive reviews from critics, and was nominated for Best Film Editing at the 31st Critics' Choice Awards and the 79th British Academy Film Awards.

== Plot ==
In Washington, DC, Captain Olivia Walker, the oversight officer for the White House Situation Room, is informed of several geopolitical developments: an imminent military exercise by the People's Liberation Army of China, suspicious chatter between Iran and its proxies, and silence from North Korea after a recent ballistic missile test.

The Pacific-based SBX-1 early-warning radar detects an unidentified ICBM in flight over the northwest Pacific. Initially presumed to be a North Korean test, the situation changes when the ICBM enters low orbit, with a trajectory targeting Chicago within the next twenty minutes.

A video conference is initiated among the Situation Room, the Pentagon, and various commands of the armed forces. The President of the United States joins last, and the alert level is raised to DEFCON 2. NORTHCOM directs units under Maj. Daniel Gonzalez at Fort Greely, Alaska, to launch two ground-based interceptors (GBI). The first fails to deploy while the second misses, leaving only the hope that the missile will malfunction and fail to detonate. The alert level is now raised to the highest level DEFCON 1.

U.S. Secretary of Defense Reid Baker initiates the continuity of government protocol, resulting in the evacuation of designated federal employees, including FEMA official Cathy Rogers. Deputy National Security Advisor (Note: The National Security Advisor is in a scheduled surgery, under anesthesia) Jake Baerington, who was rushed to the Presidential Emergency Operations Center (PEOC), advises the president not to retaliate until the missile's origin is confirmed. With impact only a few minutes away, Walker phones her family to warn them to leave the D.C. area.

Earlier that morning, at Offutt AFB in Nebraska, STRATCOM commander Gen. Anthony Brady has been informed of the launch, and joins the conference call while B-2 bombers under the Indo-Pacific Command are scrambled to prepare for possible retaliation. Brady's team observes that China, Russia, and Iran have mobilized their forces. He presents the president with the OPLAN 8010 and recommends immediate retaliation.

While Baerington rushes to the PEOC, he considers attributing the launch to North Korea, and confers with NSA advisor Ana Park, who thinks North Korea may possess submarine-launched ballistic missiles. Baerington and Park warn that failure of the DSP satellites to detect the launch could indicate a cyberattack against U.S. command and control systems.

Baerington speaks with Russia's foreign minister, who denies that Russia or China launched the missile, but threatens retaliation if Russia is targeted. Baerington attempts to convince him to stand down all Russian military assets in goodwill; the minister leaves to present the idea to the Russian president. With the ICBM nearing Chicago, the President confirms his nuclear command authority with Brady through the "biscuit"; Brady advises him to consult with his nuclear aide, Lt Cdr. Robert Reeves, regarding retaliation options.

Earlier that morning, Reeves accompanies the President to a basketball event, while Baker starts work at the Pentagon. Both are informed of the unfolding crisis. The president is removed by the Secret Service, while Baker unsuccessfully attempts to evacuate his estranged daughter from Chicago. The president is uncertain of Baerington's idea of non-retaliation, considering it surrender, but cannot bring himself to retaliate as suggested by Brady.

The president learns of the GBIs' failure to intercept and is airlifted by Marine One to an undisclosed location. While airborne, he confirms his nuclear authority with Brady, confers with Reeves regarding strike options, and is informed of Baerington's conversation with the Russian foreign minister. He informs the First Lady, who is in Kenya, of the coming disaster. While he is being evacuated, Baker dies by suicide by jumping from the rooftop helipad.

The President discusses with Reeves the precariousness of nuclear proliferation, comparing it to living in "a house of dynamite". He is divided between Baerington's advice against retaliation and Brady's advice supporting it. Reeves presents him with two major retaliation options from the OPLAN. Rogers and Park enter the Raven Rock Mountain Complex, and Gonzalez kneels outside Fort Greely.

== Cast ==
- Idris Elba as President of the United States
- Rebecca Ferguson as Captain Olivia "Liv" Walker, the duty officer in charge of the White House Situation Room during the crisis
- Gabriel Basso as Deputy National Security Advisor Jake Baerington
- Jared Harris as Secretary of Defense Reid Baker
- Tracy Letts as General Anthony Brady, Combatant Commander of United States Strategic Command (STRATCOM)
- Anthony Ramos as Major Daniel Gonzalez, commander of Fort Greely, Alaska
- Moses Ingram as Cathy Rogers, a FEMA official with the Office of National Continuity Programs
- Jonah Hauer-King as Lieutenant Commander Robert Reeves, the Presidential Military Aide
- Greta Lee as Ana Park, the National Intelligence Officer for North Korea
- Jason Clarke as Admiral Mark Miller, Director of the White House Situation Room
- Malachi Beasley as SCPO William Davis, Walker's colleague in the Situation Room
- Brian Tee as SAIC Ken Cho, the head of the United States Secret Service Presidential Protection Detail
- Brittany O'Grady as Lily Baerington, Jake's pregnant wife and a Senatorial aide on Capitol Hill
- Gbenga Akinnagbe as Major General Steven Kyle, Director of Global Operations (J-3), STRATCOM
- Willa Fitzgerald as Abby Jansing, a CNN representative at the White House Press Briefing Room
- Renée Elise Goldsberry as First Lady of the United States
- Kyle Allen as Captain John Zimmer, a B-2 bomber pilot
- Kaitlyn Dever as Caroline Baker, Baker's daughter
- Francesca Carpanini as Staff Sergeant Ali Jones, a soldier at Fort Greely
- Abubakr Ali as Lieutenant Dan Buck, a soldier at Fort Greely
- Angel Reese as herself in a cameo appearance

== Production ==
In May 2024, it was announced that Kathryn Bigelow would direct a thriller film for Netflix, her first feature film since Detroit (2017). In June, Idris Elba, Rebecca Ferguson, Gabriel Basso, Jared Harris, and Greta Lee joined the cast. In August, Tracy Letts and Moses Ingram joined. In September, Anthony Ramos, Brian Tee, Jonah Hauer-King, Kyle Allen, Francesca Carpanini, Abubakr Ali, Malachi Beasley, Aminah Nieves, and Jason Clarke joined the cast of the film. In October, Gbenga Akinnagbe joined the cast.

On October 24, it was reported that filming had begun in and around Trenton, New Jersey, where the New Jersey State House doubled for both The Pentagon and the United States Capitol. The Prudential Center in Newark doubled for a Washington basketball arena. Studio sequences were filmed at Cinelease Studios–Caven Point in Jersey City, New Jersey. Location filming took place in Washington, D.C.; at Gettysburg National Military Park in Pennsylvania during the 161st Battle of Gettysburg Anniversary reenactment; at Segera Retreat in Laikipia County, Kenya; and near Höfn, Iceland, which doubled for Fort Greely in Alaska. In early December, it was reported that the film was in post-production.

== Accuracy ==
The film's sets and its portrayal of the telecommunications that would ensue in the event of an urgent threat of imminent nuclear attack were commended as being accurate. However, its central premise was deemed unlikely by some experts, who contend that a nuclear attack would likely involve many missiles instead of a single missile, and that use of nuclear weapons is more likely to erupt from a more conventional conflict instead of "out of the blue", like the film depicts. It is also unlikely that leadership would be pressured to respond to a nuclear attack before the first strike arrives, instead relying on second strike capabilities.

Experts were divided over the depiction of U.S. missile defenses. The film has drawn criticism from the U.S. Department of Defense and the subordinate agency which is responsible for the U.S. missile defense system, the Missile Defense Agency, for misstating the reliability of the Ground-Based Interceptor (GBI) system, which has an officially recorded success rate of 100% interception, versus 61% as stated in the film. Screenwriter Oppenheim responded that the 100% rate quoted was only for certain recent tests, while the overall success rate for the 20 tests conducted since the system was introduced in 1999, backed up by publicly available data, is 57%. Ted Postol of MIT, a critic of the Missile Defense Agency, praised the film's accuracy and stated that the 61% claim was artificially high. In a presentation with retired U.S. Army officer Daniel Davis, Postol broke down how the 61% figure was calculated, and claimed that the entire missile defense program is fraudulent.

== Release ==
In June 2025, the film's title was revealed to be A House of Dynamite, with the film scheduled to be given a limited theatrical release in the United States sometime in October 2025 before streaming on Netflix on October 24. In August 2025, it was announced that the film would be released in select theaters in the United Kingdom on October 3, 2025, and globally on October 10. A House of Dynamite premiered in the main competition of the 82nd Venice International Film Festival on September 2, 2025.

== Reception ==
=== Critical response ===
On the review aggregator website Rotten Tomatoes, 75% of 258 critics' reviews are positive, with an average rating of 7.3/10. The website's consensus reads: "Playing out a nightmare scenario with nerve-wracking plausibility, Kathryn Bigelow's masterfully-constructed A House of Dynamite is an urgent thriller that's as distressing as it is riveting." Metacritic, which uses a weighted average, assigned the film a score of 75 out of 100, based on 51 critics, indicating "generally favorable" reviews.

Writing for RogerEbert.com, critic Glenn Kenny gave the film four out of four stars, writing that the film is a "tense, precise, extremely sobering thriller" and that Elba showcased the range of his acting abilities. Pete Hammond of Deadline Hollywood wrote that the film "might not fall into the horror movie genre, but it might as well because it is more frightening than any of them".

=== Accolades ===
Award	Date of ceremony	Category	Recipient(s)	Result	Ref.
AACTA International Awards	February 6, 2026	Best Screenplay	Noah Oppenheim	Nominated	
AARP Movies for Grownups Awards	January 10, 2026	Best Picture	A House of Dynamite	Nominated	
AARP Movies for Grownups Awards	January 10, 2026	Best Director	Kathryn Bigelow	Nominated	
AARP Movies for Grownups Awards	January 10, 2026	Best Ensemble	A House of Dynamite	Nominated	
Alliance of Women Film Journalists	December 31, 2025	Female Focus: Best Female Director	Kathryn Bigelow	Nominated	
British Academy Film Awards	February 22, 2026	Best Editing	Kirk Baxter	Nominated	
Camerimage	November 22, 2025	Golden Frog	Barry Ackroyd	Nominated	
Capri Hollywood International Film Festival	January 2, 2026	Best Film Editing	Kirk Baxter	Honored	
Capri Hollywood International Film Festival	January 2, 2026	Best Sound Editing	Paul N. J. Ottosson	Honored	
Celebration of Cinema and Television	October 24, 2025	Supporting Actor – Film	Anthony Ramos	Honored	
Critics' Choice Awards	January 4, 2026	Best Film Editing	Kirk Baxter	Nominated	
Golden Trailer Awards	May 28, 2026	Best Voice Over (The Don LaFontaine Award)	Pale Blue Dot / Netflix / Mark Woollen & Associates	Nominated	
Golden Trailer Awards	May 28, 2026	Most Original Trailer	Pale Blue Dot / Netflix / Mark Woollen & Associates	Nominated	
Hollywood Music in Media Awards	November 19, 2025	Best Original Score in a Feature Film	Volker Bertelmann	Nominated	
International Cinephile Society	February 8, 2026	Best Editing	Kirk Baxter	Nominated	
Middleburg Film Festival	October 19, 2025	Special Achievement in Screenwriting	Noah Oppenheim	Honored	
NAACP Image Awards	February 28, 2026	Outstanding Ensemble Cast in a Motion Picture	Idris Elba, Rebecca Ferguson, Gabriel Basso, Jared Harris, Tracy Letts, Anthony Ramos, Moses Ingram, Jonah Hauer-King, Greta Lee, and Jason Clarke	Nominated	
San Francisco Bay Area Film Critics Circle	December 14, 2025	Best Film Editing	Kirk Baxter	Nominated	
Satellite Awards	March 10, 2026	Best Editing	Kirk Baxter	Nominated	
Satellite Awards	March 10, 2026	Best Original Score	Volker Bertelmann	Nominated	
St. Louis Film Critics Association	December 14, 2025	Best Ensemble	A House of Dynamite	Nominated	
St. Louis Film Critics Association	December 14, 2025	Best Editing	Kirk Baxter	Nominated	
Venice Film Festival	September 6, 2025	Golden Lion	Kathryn Bigelow	Nominated	
Visual Effects Society Awards	February 25, 2026	Outstanding Supporting Visual Effects in a Photoreal Feature	Chris Harvey, Dione Wood, Jon Mitchell, and Matthew Lane	Nominated	
Washington D.C. Area Film Critics Association	December 7, 2025	Joe Barber Award for Best Portrayal of Washington, D.C.	A House of Dynamite	Won	

== See also ==
- Dr. Strangelove, a 1964 film, satire, black comedy
- Fail Safe, a 1964 film, political drama
- Nuclear War: A Scenario, a 2024 speculative non-fiction book by Annie Jacobsen exploring a similar theme and timeline
- The Day After, a 1983 film, disaster drama
- Threads, a 1984 film, apocalyptic drama
- WarGames, a 1983 film, techno-thriller
