= 2025 GameAbove Sports Bowl =

Postseason college football bowl game

- 11th GameAbove Sports Bowl
Central Michigan Chippewas	Northwestern Wildcats
(7–5)	(6–6)
MAC	Big Ten
7	34
Head coach: Matt Drinkall	Head coach: David Braun
	1	2	3	4	Total
Central Michigan	0	0	0	7	7
Northwestern	0	21	13	0	34
- Date: December 26, 2025
- Season: 2025
- Stadium: Ford Field
- Location: Detroit, Michigan
- MVP: Griffin Wilde (WR, Northwestern)
- Favorite: Northwestern by 10.5
- Referee: Ted Pitts (Sun Belt)
- Attendance: 27,857

United States TV coverage
- Network: ESPN
- Announcers: Matt Schumacker (play-by-play), Dustin Fox (analyst), and Ashley Stroehlein (sideline)

The 2025 GameAbove Sports Bowl was a college football bowl game played on December 26, 2025, at Ford Field in Detroit, Michigan. It was the eleventh and final annual GameAbove Sports Bowl (though only the second under that name). The game began at approximately 1:00 p.m. EST and aired on ESPN. It was one of the 2025–26 bowl games concluding the 2025 FBS football season. The title sponsor for the bowl game was GameAbove Sports, a company that invests in sports teams, academies, and initiatives.

The 2025 GameAbove Sports Bowl featured the Northwestern Wildcats (6–6) from the Big Ten Conference and the Central Michigan Chippewas (7–5) from the Mid-American Conference. Northwestern beat Central Michigan by a score of 34–7.

== Teams ==
Consistent with conference tie-ins, the game featured a team from the Big Ten Conference, the Northwestern Wildcats, and a team from the Mid-American Conference (MAC), the Central Michigan Chippewas. The teams had met only once previously, on September 25, 2010, at Northwestern's Ryan Field in Evanston, Illinois, where Northwestern won, 30–25.

=== Central Michigan Chippewas ===
Central Michigan lost two of their first three games, the won four of their next five; their record stood at 5–3 at the end of October. The Chippewas won two of their final four regular-season games and entered the GameAbove Sports Bowl with a 7–5 record.

=== Northwestern Wildcats ===
Northwestern opened their season with two loses in their first three games, then had a four-game winning streak to improve their record to 5–2. They finished their regular season with four losses in five games, and entered the GameAbove Sports Bowl with a 6–6 record.

== Game summary ==
2025 GameAbove Sports Bowl

Quarter	1	2	3	4	Total
Central Michigan	0	0	0	7	7
Northwestern	0	21	13	0	34

at Ford Field • Detroit, Michigan

- Date: Friday, December 26, 2025
- Game time: 1:00 p.m. EST
- Game weather: n/a (indoor)
- Game attendance: 27,857
- Referee: Ted Pitts
- TV announcers (ESPN): Matt Schumacker (play-by-play), Dustin Fox (analyst), and Ashley Stroehlein (sideline)
- Box score

=== Statistics ===
Statistics	CMU	NW
First downs	15	18
Plays–yards	60–269	61–313
Rushes–yards	34–91	26–77
Passing yards	178	236
Passing: comp–att–int	21–26–1	20–35–1
Time of possession	32:42	27:18

Team	Category	Player	Statistics
Central Michigan	Passing	Joe Labas	21/25, 178 yards, 1 TD
Central Michigan	Rushing	Trey Cornsit	11 carries, 66 yards
Central Michigan	Receiving	Langston Lewis	8 receptions, 83 yards
Northwestern	Passing	Preston Stone	19/31, 226 yards, 3 TD
Northwestern	Rushing	Caleb Komolafe	15 carries, 55 yards, 1 TD
Northwestern	Receiving	Griffin Wilde	10 receptions, 97 yards, 2 TD
