= Lloyd Braun =

American media executive (born 1958)

- Born: 1958 (age 67–68)
- Education: Vassar College (AB) University of California College of the Law, San Francisco (JD)
- Occupation: Media executive
- Known for: Chairman of ABC Entertainment Television Group; Owner of Whalerock Industries; Chairman of WME
- Spouse: Lauren Michelson
- Children: 4
- Father: David Braun

Lloyd Braun (born 1958) is an American media executive and attorney.

== Early life and education ==
Braun was born in New York, the son of Merna and David Braun, a renowned music industry attorney who was Bob Dylan's lawyer and was involved in the founding of the Rock and Roll Hall of Fame. He was raised in Great Neck. He earned an A.B. degree from Vassar College in 1980, and received a J.D. degree from UC Law San Francisco (formerly Hastings College of the Law) in 1983.

== Career ==
Braun began his career as an entertainment attorney. His clients included Larry David, Howard Stern and David Chase. The character Lloyd Braun on the sitcom Seinfeld, created by David, was named after him. In an interview between Larry David and Howard Stern, David said that a conversation he had with Braun about Braun's father served as a "jumping-off point" for the writing of his Broadway play Fish in the Dark. David Chase credited Braun with encouraging him to create the TV series that eventually became The Sopranos.

=== Brillstein Grey Entertainment ===
Braun left his law practice in 1994 to serve as president of Brillstein-Grey Entertainment until 1999, overseeing its motion picture, television and management divisions. At Brillstein-Grey, Braun oversaw the building of Brillstein’s television studio, and the development of such hit shows as The Sopranos, Just Shoot Me, and NewsRadio.

=== American Broadcasting Company ===
Braun went on to serve as Chairman of Buena Vista Television Productions, overseeing Disney’s television studios, from 1999 to 2001, and then Chairman of ABC Entertainment Group from 2001-2004. He was forced out of his position at ABC shortly after greenlighting the $13 million pilot to the television show Lost, one of the most expensive in modern broadcasting. The script of Lost had been heavily criticized by Michael Eisner who was CEO of ABC's parent Disney; nonetheless, Braun pushed on with filming the pilot episode in Hawaii. Braun's decision was vindicated, however, when the show went on to become a huge success; Braun eventually joined the cast and crew of Lost, providing his voice to the intros of each episode with "previously on Lost".

Braun and his partner, Susan Lyne, also greenlit other ABC shows that went on to great success in the years following his dismissal, including Desperate Housewives, Extreme Makeover Home Edition, Boston Legal, The Bachelor and Grey's Anatomy. Braun also signed Jimmy Kimmel to ABC in 2002, and launched Jimmy Kimmel Live! following the Super Bowl in 2003. These shows began an unprecedented turnaround for ABC.

=== Yahoo! Media Group and Whalerock Industries ===
In November 2004, Braun joined Yahoo! to run Yahoo! Media Group, the company's content division. While at Yahoo!, Braun initiated and oversaw the development of the highly successful celebrity site OMG! Braun also developed the daily video show The 9 and oversaw major redesigns of Yahoo!'s media sites. Braun resigned from Yahoo! in December 2006 to partner with Gail Berman to form the entertainment company BermanBraun, which would formally begin operations in early 2007.

BermanBraun entered into a strategic alliance with NBC to create television programming for which NBC would have a first look. In August 2010, BermanBraun announced a multiyear partnership with Starcom MediaVest to create new digital content and advertising solutions available "first" to SMG clients. SMG is part of Publicis Groupe, the world's third-largest communications group. BermanBraun would establish itself in content production, with properties across three platforms: television, digital and film. BermanBraun's most notable productions would be the game show Duel (which ran on ABC between December 2007 and July 2008) and the scripted science fiction drama Alphas (which ran on Syfy between July 2011 and October 2012). The company also produced the second season of Brad Meltzer's Decoded for History Channel, as well as Unchained Reaction for the Discovery Channel (which itself was produced in conjunction with MythBusters hosts Adam Savage and Jamie Hyneman). Polyamory: Married & Dating for Showtime and Junk Gypsies for HGTV were later launched by the company.

In March 2012, BermanBraun purchased Whiskey Media, acquiring the websites Tested, Screened, and Anime Vice.

In February 2014, Braun became the sole owner of BermanBraun, renaming the company Whalerock Industries.

Whalerock produced premium content for television, film and theater; owned and operated over a dozen digital brands; provided consulting services for media companies and brands; and partnered with influencers and brand owners—including Tyler the Creator and the Kardashians—to create, build and operate direct-to-consumer multi-media apps.

=== WME ===
From 2019 to 2023, Braun served as chairman of the global talent agency WME and president of the Endeavor Client Group. He oversaw all aspects of the representation businesses of Endeavor, including WME, WME Sports, IMG Models, The Wall Group and Art + Commerce.

=== Prologue Entertainment ===
In December 2024, Braun launched Prologue Entertainment with partners Noah Oppenheim and Sarah Bremner. Prologue is an independent production studio financed by Jeff Zucker and RedBird Capital Partners set up to develop and produce premium films and television series.

=== aTwist ===
In September 2026, Braun launched aTwist with partners Jana Winograde and Susan Rovner. aTwist is a studio and streaming platform that develops original vertical microseries.

Preceded by Stuart Bloomberg	Chairman of ABC Entertainment; 2002-2004	Succeeded by Stephen McPherson
