= David Braun (American football) =

American football player and coach (born 1985)

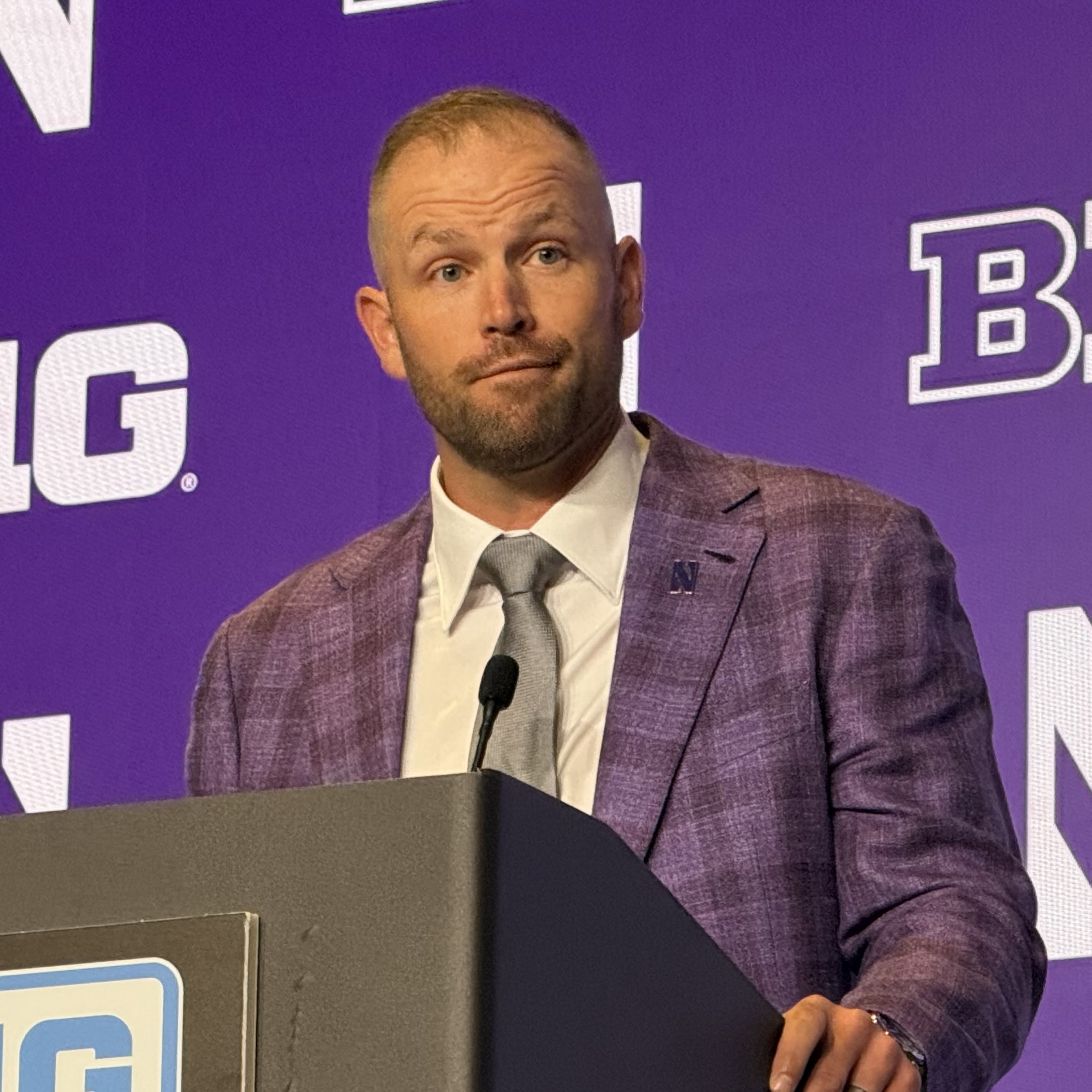
- Braun at 2026 Big Ten Media Days

Current position
- Title: Head coach
- Team: Northwestern
- Conference: Big Ten
- Record: 25–24

Biographical details
- Born: April 2, 1985 (age 41); Lake Forest, Illinois, U.S.
- Education: Winona State University

Playing career
- 2004–2007: Winona State
- Position: Defensive lineman

Coaching career (HC unless noted)
- 2008–2009: Winona State (GA)
- 2010: Culver–Stockton (DC/LB)
- 2011–2014: Winona State (co-DC/LB)
- 2015–2016: UC Davis (DL)
- 2017: Northern Iowa (RGC/DL)
- 2018: Northern Iowa (STC/OLB)
- 2019–2022: North Dakota State (DC/S)
- 2023: Northwestern (interim HC / DC)
- 2023–present: Northwestern

Head coaching record
- Overall: 25–24
- Bowls: 2–0

Accomplishments and honors

Awards
- Big Ten Coach of the Year (2023); Paul "Bear" Bryant Newcomer Coach of the Year Award (2023)

David Braun (born April 2, 1985) is an American college football coach and former player. He is the head football coach at Northwestern University, a position he has held since 2023.

== Early life and education ==
Braun is from Wales, Wisconsin, where he attended Kettle Moraine High School.

== Coaching career ==
Braun began his coaching career as a graduate assistant at Winona State University, his alma mater, in 2008. In 2010, he was made the defensive coordinator and linebackers coach at Culver–Stockton College before returning to Winona State the following year. where he worked as the co-defensive coordinator and linebackers coach until the end of the 2014 season. In 2015 he became the defensive line coach at the University of California, Davis, where he stayed until the end of the 2016 season. In 2017, he was made the defensive line coach and run game coordinator at Northern Iowa University. In 2018, he was made the outside linebackers coach and special teams coordinator. He was named the defensive coordinator and safeties coach at North Dakota State University in January 2019.

=== Northwestern ===
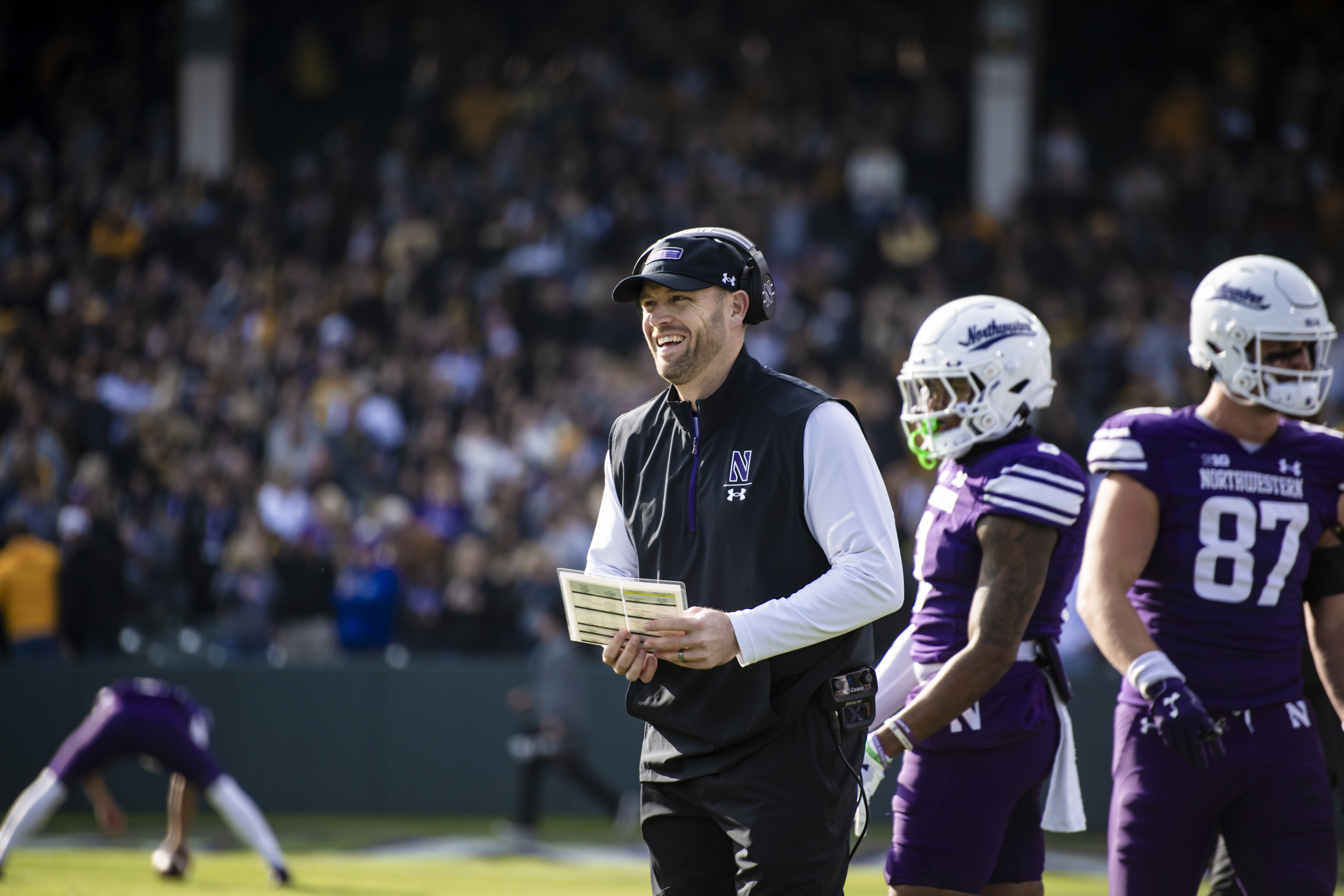
Braun coaching in 2023

Braun was hired by head coach Pat Fitzgerald as defensive coordinator at Northwestern University in January 2023. After Fitzgerald was fired amid allegations of widespread hazing within the football program, Braun was named Northwestern's interim head coach. The week after Northwestern broke its 14-game road losing streak by defeating Wisconsin, Braun was made Northwestern's permanent head coach.

Northwestern finished the regular season with a 7–5 record—the most wins for any first-year Northwestern football coach since 1903—and qualified for a bowl game for the first time since 2020. Braun was named the 2023 Big Ten Coach of the Year for his turnaround of the program. He led his team to a victory at the Las Vegas Bowl against Utah on December 23, 2023. Braun is the first Northwestern head coach to lead a team to a bowl in his opening season.

== Personal life ==
Braun and his wife Kristin have three children.

== Head coaching record ==
Year	Team	Overall	Conference	Standing	Bowl/playoffs
Northwestern Wildcats (Big Ten Conference) (2023–present)
2023	Northwestern	8–5	5–4	T–2nd (West)	W Las Vegas
2024	Northwestern	4–8	2–7	16th	
2025	Northwestern	7–6	4–5	T–10th	W GameAbove Sports
2026	Northwestern	6–5	3–5		
Northwestern:		25–24	14–21		
Total:		25–24			
