= David Braun (lawyer) =

American lawyer

- Born: The Bronx, New York, U.S.
- Died: January 28, 2013; Santa Barbara, California, U.S.
- Education: Columbia College (BA); Columbia Law School (JD)
- Occupation: Lawyer
- Children: Lloyd Braun

David Braun (died January 28, 2013) was an American entertainment lawyer who was considered "one of the most powerful lawyers in the music industry during its heyday" by Variety. He represented famous artists such as Bob Dylan, Neil Diamond, George Harrison and Michael Jackson, and served as president of Polygram Records.

== Biography ==
Braun was born in The Bronx as an only child. He graduated from Columbia College and Columbia Law School, obtaining a joint B.A. and J.D. degree in 1954. After law school, he joined the firm Pryor, Braun, Cashman & Sherman, where he represented writers, performers, producers and advertising agencies.

Early in his career, he was introduced to Bob Dylan, and eventually came to represent musicians such as Neil Diamond, George Harrison, Michael Jackson, The Band, Peter, Paul & Mary and Judy Collins. He became a close friend of Neil Diamond, who called him "one of the great figures in [his] life" during a 2008 awards ceremony hosted by the Grammy Foundation.

He joined the firm Hardee, Barovick, Konecky & Braun in the 1970s and moved his practice from New York City to Beverly Hills, California, where he trained many of the music industry's most prominent attorneys. He was also involved in the founding of the Rock and Roll Hall of Fame.

In 1981, he left law to become president and CEO of Polygram Records, and returned to law practice two years later. In 1990, he joined Proskauer Rose as special counsel.

== Personal life and family ==
Braun died on January 28, 2013, at his home in Santa Barbara, California. His son is Lloyd Braun, former chairman of ABC Entertainment and founder of Whalerock Industries.
