= Griffin Wilde =

American football player

No. 17 – Northwestern Wildcats
- Position: Wide receiver
- Class: Senior

Personal information
- Listed height: 6 ft 2 in (1.88 m)
- Listed weight: 200 lb (91 kg)

Career information
- High school: Thomas Jefferson (Sioux Falls, South Dakota)
- College: South Dakota State (2023–2024); Northwestern (2025–present)

Awards and highlights
- GameAbove Sports Bowl MVP (2025); Third-team All-Big Ten

Career statistics as of 2026
- Games played: 15
- Receptions: 79
- Receiving yards: 1,069
- Receiving average: 13.5
- Receiving touchdowns: 8
- Stats at ESPN

Griffin Wilde is an American college football wide receiver for the Northwestern Wildcats. He previously played for the South Dakota State Jackrabbits.

== Early life ==
Wilde attended Thomas Jefferson High School in Sioux Falls, South Dakota. Over his junior and senior seasons he combined for 100 receptions for 1,858 yards with 22 touchdowns. Wilde committed to South Dakota State University to play college football. He also played basketball in high school.

== College career ==
Wilde was a starter his true freshman year at South Dakota State in 2023 and had 20 receptions for 399 yards and six touchdowns. He became the Jackrabbits number one receiver in 2024, recording 71 receptions for 1,147 yards and 12 touchdowns. After the season, Wilde entered the transfer portal and transferred to Northwestern University. He was a starter his first year at Northwestern in 2025. In their upset victory over the Penn State Nittany Lions, he had seven receptions for 94 yards and a touchdown. Wilde was named MVP of the 2025 GameAbove Sports Bowl. In 2026, Wilde faced his former team and recorded three receptions for 104 yards in an 34-18 win.
