= Trenton Boykin =

American football player and coach (born 1970)

Current position
- Title: Offensive Quality Control Assistant
- Team: William & Mary Tribe
- Conference: Patriot League

Biographical details
- Born: November 13, 1970 (age 55)

Playing career
- 1991–1994: Youngstown State
- Position: Wide receiver

Coaching career (HC unless noted)
- 1996–1997: Akron (GA)
- 1998: Boston College (GA)
- 1999: Tiffin (WR)
- 2000–2002: Youngstown State (ST/WR)
- 2003–2004: Ball State (ST/RB)
- 2005–2007: Kentucky State (AHC/OC)
- 2008–2009: Lane
- 2010: Lambuth (OC/QB)
- 2011: Wayne State (MI) (RB)
- 2012–2014: Akron (RB)
- 2015–2017: Akron (TE)
- 2018: Akron (RB)
- 2020–2023: Hampton (ST/RB)
- 2024–2025: Hampton
- 2026-present: William & Mary (Offensive Quality Control Assistant)

Head coaching record
- Overall: 11–34

Trenton Boykin (born November 13, 1970) is an American college football coach for William & Mary and a former player. He recently was the head football coach at Hampton University. Boykin served as the head football coach at Lane College in Jackson, Tennessee from 2008 to 2009, compiling a record of 4–17.

Boykin was a wide receiver at Youngstown State University, where he was a member of three NCAA Division I–AA national Championship teams.

== Head coaching record ==
Year	Team	Overall	Conference	Standing	Bowl/playoffs
Lane Dragons (Southern Intercollegiate Athletic Conference) (2008–2009)
2008	Lane	4–7	4–5	T–6th	
2009	Lane	0–10	0–9	10th	
Lane:		4–17	4–14		
Hampton Pirates (Coastal Athletic Association Football Conference) (2024–2025)
2024	Hampton	5–7	2–6	T–12th	
2025	Hampton	2–10	0–8	14th	
Hampton:		7–17	2–14		
Total:		11–34			
