= 2025 Campbell Fighting Camels football team =

American college football season

2025 Campbell Fighting Camels football
- Conference: CAA Football
- Record: 2–10 (2–6 CAA)
- Head coach: Braxton Harris (2nd season)
- Offensive coordinator: Matt Kubik (2nd season)
- Defensive coordinator: Eric Daniels (2nd season)
- Home stadium: Barker–Lane Stadium

2025 Coastal Athletic Association Football Conference standings
	Conf.			Overall
Team	W		L	W		L
No. 11 Rhode Island $^	8	–	0	11	–	3
No. 4т Villanova ^	7	–	1	12	–	3
No. 23 New Hampshire ^	6	–	2	8	–	5
No. 22 Monmouth	6	–	2	9	–	3
William & Mary	6	–	2	7	–	5
Maine	5	–	3	6	–	6
Elon	4	–	4	6	–	6
Stony Brook	4	–	4	6	–	6
Towson	4	–	4	6	–	6
North Carolina A&T	2	–	6	2	–	10
Campbell	2	–	6	2	–	10
Bryant	1	–	7	3	–	9
Albany	1	–	7	2	–	10
Hampton	0	–	8	2	–	10
$ – Conference champion; ^ – FCS playoff participant; Rankings from STATS Poll

The 2025 Campbell Fighting Camels football team represented Campbell University as a member of Coastal Athletic Association Football Conference (CAA) during the 2025 NCAA Division I FCS football season. The Fighting Camels were led by second-year head coach Braxton Harris, and played their home games at Barker–Lane Stadium in Buies Creek, North Carolina.

== Schedule ==
Date	Time	Opponent	Site	TV	Result	Attendance
August 29	6:00 p.m.	at No. 9 Rhode Island	Meade Stadium; Kingston, RI	FloFootball	L 20–31	5,267
September 6	6:00 p.m.	at East Carolina*	Dowdy–Ficklen Stadium; Greenville, NC	ESPN+	L 3–56	35,120
September 13	3:30 p.m.	Furman*	Barker–Lane Stadium; Buies Creek, NC	FloFootball	L 24–28	4,314
September 20	6:00 p.m.	Bryant	Barker–Lane Stadium; Buies Creek, NC	FloFootball	W 50–48 ^{2OT}	3,389
September 27	3:30 p.m.	Western Carolina*	Barker–Lane Stadium; Buies Creek, NC	FloFootball	L 35–42	4,060
October 4	2:00 p.m.	at NC State*	Carter–Finley Stadium; Raleigh, NC	ESPN+	L 10–56	56,919
October 11	2:00 p.m.	at Hampton	Armstrong Stadium; Hampton, VA	FloFootball	W 38–21	3,358
October 18	3:30 p.m.	New Hampshire	Barker–Lane Stadium; Buies Creek, NC	FloFootball	L 10–24	4,369
October 25	1:00 p.m.	at North Carolina A&T	Truist Stadium; Greensboro, NC	FloFootball	L 24–28	7,468
November 8	2:00 p.m.	William & Mary	Barker–Lane Stadium; Buies Creek, NC	FloFootball	L 27–30 ^{OT}	3,309
November 15	2:00 p.m.	Elon	Barker–Lane Stadium; Buies Creek, NC	FloFootball	L 24–31	3,243
November 22	1:00 p.m.	at Towson	Johnny Unitas Stadium; Towson, MD	FloFootball	L 31–35	3,914
*Non-conference game; Rankings from STATS Poll released prior to the game; All times are in Eastern time

== Game summaries ==
=== at No. 9 Rhode Island ===
Campbell Fighting Camels (0–0) at No. 9 Rhode Island Rams (0–0) – Game summary

Quarter	1	2	3	4	Total
Fighting Camels	7	10	3	0	20
No. 9 Rams	7	7	3	14	31

at Meade Stadium • Kingston, RI

- Date: August 29
- Game time: 6:00 PM EDT
- Game weather: Sunny
- Game attendance: 5,267
- Referee: Tom Zetts
- TV announcers (FloSports): Jonathan Blair (play-by-play) and Ryan Pelillo (analyst)

Game information

First quarter

- URI – Kevin Schaeffer 31-yard pass from Devin Farrell (Garth White kick), 13:07. Rams 7–0. Drive: 4 plays, 75 yards, 1:53.
- CAMP – JJ Cowan 1-yard pass from Kamden Sixkiller (Alex Crabb kick), 4:35. Tied 7–7. Drive: 2 plays, 3 yards, 0:47.

Second quarter

- CAMP – Mike Chandler II 6-yard run (Alex Crabb kick), 6:44. Fighting Camels 14–7. Drive: 16 plays, 90 yards, 8:39.
- CAMP – Alex Crabb 29-yard field goal, 5:51. Fighting Camels 17–7. Drive: 4 plays, 7 yards, 0:41.
- URI – Antwain Littleton Jr. 2-yard run (Garth White kick), 1:57. Fighting Camels 17–14. Drive: 8 plays, 75 yards, 3:54.

Third quarter

- CAMP – Alex Crabb 40-yard field goal, 8:45. Fighting Camels 20–14. Drive: 6 plays, 19 yards, 2:41.
- URI – Garth White 36-yard field goal, 3:58. Fighting Camels 20–17. Drive: 7 plays, 35 yards, 2:23.

Fourth quarter

- URI – Antwain Littleon Jr. 1-yard run (Garth White kick), 12:02. Rams 24–20. Drive: 13 plays, 66 yards, 5:59.
- URI – Marquis Buchanan 46-yard pass from Devin Farrell (Garth White kick), 9:27. Rams 31–20. Drive: 1 play, 46 yards, 0:10.

Statistics	CAM	URI
First downs	13	21
Plays–yards	68–268	62–384
Rushes–yards	32–120	34–109
Passing yards	148	275
Passing: Comp–Att–Int	18–36–0	15–28–0
Turnovers	1	3
Time of possession	31:05	28:55

Team	Category	Player	Statistics
Campbell	Passing	Kamden Sixkiller	17/33, 144 yards, TD
Campbell	Rushing	JJ Cowan	7 carries, 43 yards
Campbell	Receiving	Spencer Jones	4 receptions, 55 yards
Rhode Island	Passing	Devin Farrell	15/28, 275 yards, 2 TD
Rhode Island	Rushing	Antwain Littleton Jr.	25 carries, 85 yards, 2 TD
Rhode Island	Receiving	Marquis Buchanan	6 receptions, 167 yards, TD

=== at East Carolina (FBS) ===
Campbell Fighting Camels (0–1) at East Carolina Pirates (FBS) (0–1) – Game summary

Quarter	1	2	3	4	Total
Fighting Camels	0	3	0	0	3
Pirates (FBS)	14	21	14	7	56

at Dowdy–Ficklen Stadium • Greenville, North Carolina

- Date: September 6
- Game time: 6:00 p.m. EDT
- Game weather: Sunny • Temperature: 91 °F (33 °C) • Wind: S at 8 miles per hour (13 km/h)
- Game attendance: 35,120
- Referee: Zachary Erdmann
- TV announcers (ESPN+): Joe Tordy (play-by-play) and Doc Holliday (analyst)

Game information

First quarter

- (12:32) ECU – Desirrio Riles 18-yard pass from Katin Houser, Andrew Conrad kick (Drive: 8 plays, 75 yards, 2:28; East Carolina 7–0)
- (6:21) ECU – London Montgomery 1-yard run, Andrew Conrad kick (Drive: 10 plays, 73 yards, 3:21; East Carolina 14–0)

Second quarter

- (12:58) CAM – Alex Crabb 29-yard field goal (Drive: 19 plays, 85 yards, 8:23; East Carolina 14–3)
- (11:50) ECU – Brock Spalding 55-yard pass from Katin Houser, Andrew Conrad kick (Drive: 5 plays, 75 yards, 1:08; East Carolina 21–3)
- (5:59) ECU – Parker Jenkins 17-yard run, Andrew Conrad kick (Drive: 4 plays, 30 yards, 1:18; East Carolina 28–3)
- (1:22) ECU – Marlon Gunn Jr. 4-yard run, Andrew Conrad kick (Drive: 12 plays, 46 yards, 2:52; East Carolina 35–3)

Third quarter

- (10:44) ECU – London Montgomery 2-yard run, Andrew Conrad kick (Drive: 7 plays, 32 yards, 2:37; East Carolina 42–3)
- (3:00) ECU – DeJuan Lacy 4-yard run, Noah Perez kick (Drive: 12 plays, 83 yards, 4:10; East Carolina 49–3)

Fourth quarter

- (2:45) ECU – Dillon Lorick 11-yard pass from Chaston Ditta, Noah Perez kick (Drive: 6 plays, 66 yards, 2:18; East Carolina 56–3)

Statistics	CAM	ECU
First downs	14	27
Plays–yards	63–151	81–535
Rushes–yards	27–4	37–172
Passing yards	147	363
Passing: comp–att–int	22–36–0	31–44–0
Turnovers	2	0
Time of possession	32:16	27:44

Team	Category	Player	Statistics
Campbell	Passing	Kamden Sixkiller	18/25, 121 yards
Campbell	Rushing	JJ Cowan	5 carries, 19 yards
Campbell	Receiving	Randall King	2 receptions, 34 yards
East Carolina	Passing	Katin Houser	25/35, 314 yards, 2 TD
East Carolina	Rushing	TJ Engleman Jr.	5 carries, 36 yards
East Carolina	Receiving	Brock Spalding	3 receptions, 81 yards, TD

=== Furman ===
Furman Paladins (1-1) at Campbell Fighting Camels (0-2) – Game summary

Quarter	1	2	3	4	Total
Paladins	3	8	7	10	28
Fighting Camels	0	10	7	7	24

at Barker–Lane Stadium • Buies Creek, NC

- Date: September 13
- Game time: 3:30 PM EDT
- Game weather: Sunny
- Game attendance: 4,314
- Referee: Todd Boyd
- TV announcers (FloFootball): Chris Hemeyer (play-by-play) and Jay Sonnhalter (analyst)

Statistics	FUR	CAM
First downs		
Total yards		
Rushing yards		
Passing yards		
Passing: Comp–Att–Int		
Time of possession		

Team	Category	Player	Statistics
Furman	Passing		
Furman	Rushing		
Furman	Receiving		
Campbell	Passing		
Campbell	Rushing		
Campbell	Receiving		

=== Bryant ===
Bryant Bulldogs (2-1) vs. Campbell Fighting Camels (1-3) – Game summary

Quarter	1	2	3	4	OT	2OT	Total
Bulldogs	0	14	7	14	7	6	48
Fighting Camels	7	14	0	14	7	8	50

at Barker–Lane Stadium • Buies Creek, NC

- Date: September 20
- Game time: 6:00 PM EDT
- Game weather: Sunny
- Game attendance: 3,389
- Referee: Henry Wimberg
- TV announcers (FloSports): Chris Hemeyer (play-by-play) and Jay Sonnhalter (analyst)

Game information

First Quarter

- (9:05) CAM – Mike Chandler 18-yard pass from Kamden Sixkiller, Alex Crabb kick (Drive: 8 plays, 60 yards, 1:08; Campbell 7–0)

Second Quarter

- (14:21) BRY – Brennan Myer 1-yard run, Bryce Soli kick (Drive: 9 plays, 83 yards, 4:40; Tied 7–7)
- (11:25) CAM – Barry Tate 59-yard run, Alex Crabb kick (Drive: 6 plays, 81 yards, 2:50; Campbell 14–7)
- (0:30) CAM – Randall King 9-yard pass from Kamden Sixkiller, Alex Crabb kick (Drive: 10 plays, 61 yards, 3:46; Campbell 21–7)
- (0:17) BRY – Keylijah Williams 100-yard kickoff return, Bryce Soli kick (Campbell 21–14)

Third Quarter

- (3:31) BRY – Dylan Kedzior 49-yard run, Bryce Soli kick (Drive: 5 plays, 69 yards, 1:46; Tied 21–21)

Fourth Quarter

- (5:33) BRY – Liam Lindo 15-yard interception, Bryce Soli kick (Bryant 28–21)
- (2:58) CAM – Randall King 77-yard pass from Kamden Sixkiller, Alex Crabb kick (Drive: 1 play, 77 yards, 0:11; Tied 28–28)
- (1:15) CAM – Randall King 11-yard pass from Kamden Sixkiller, Alex Crabb kick (Drive: 3 plays, 53 yards, 0:40; Campbell 35–28)
- (0:06) BRY – Aldrich Doe 35-yard pass from Brennan Myer, Bryce Soli kick (Drive: 7 plays, 75 yards, 1:09; Tied 35–35)

Overtime

- BRY – Brennan Myer 18-yard run, Bryce Soli kick (Drive: 3 plays, 25 yards, 0:00; Bryant 42–35)
- CAM – Randall King 3-yard pass from Mike Chandler II, Alex Crabb kick (Drive: 5 plays, 25 yards, 0:00; Tied 42–42)

Second overtime

- CAM – Dawson Adams-Grenier 7-yard pass from Kamden Sixkiller, Naieem Kearney rush (Drive: 6 plays, 25 yards, 0:00; Campbell 50–42)
- BRY – Dylan Kedzior 7-yard run (Drive: 2 plays, 25 yards, 0:00; Campbell 50–48)

Statistics	BRY	CAM
First downs	19	27
Total yards	390	557
Rushing yards	175	220
Passing yards	215	337
Passing: Comp–Att–Int	15–34–2	30–50–2
Time of possession	27:37	32:23

Team	Category	Player	Statistics
Bryant	Passing	Brennan Myer	15/34, 215 yards, TD, 2 INT
Bryant	Rushing	Dylan Kedzior	13 carries, 93 yards, 2 TD
Bryant	Receiving	Aldrich Doe	5 receptions, 92 yards, TD
Campbell	Passing	Kamden Sixkiller	29/48, 334 yards, 5 TD, 2 INT
Campbell	Rushing	Barry Tate	1 carry, 59 yards, TD
Campbell	Receiving	Randall King	8 receptions, 142 yards, 4 TD

=== Western Carolina ===
Western Carolina Catamounts (1-3) vs. Campbell Fighting Camels (1-3) – Game summary

Quarter	1	2	3	4	Total
Catamounts	7	21	7	7	42
Fighting Camels	0	10	8	17	35

at Barker–Lane Stadium • Buies Creek, NC

- Date: September 27
- Game time: 3:30 PM EDT
- Game weather: Cloudy • Temperature: 79 °F (26 °C) • Wind: SE at 3 miles per hour (4.8 km/h)
- Game attendance: 4,060
- Referee: Jeff Pumphrey
- TV announcers (FloFootball): Lendi Suggs (play-by-play) and Jay Sonnhalter (analyst)

Game information

First Quarter

- (10:37) WCU – Camury Reid 1-yard run, Marcus Trout kick (Drive: 3 plays, 12 yards, 0:40; Western Carolina 7–0)

Second Quarter

- (14:56) WCU – Brayden Blackmon 17-yard pass from Taron Dickens, Marcus Trout kick (Drive: 6 plays, 76 yards, 2:47; Western Carolina 14–0)
- (11:46) CAM – Alex Crabb 32-yard field goal (Drive: 7 plays, 45 yards, 2:58; Western Carolina 14–3)
- (8:36) WCU – Marcus Striggles 32-yard pass from Taron Dickens, Marcus Trout kick (Drive: 3 plays, 55 yards, 0:56; Western Carolina 21–3)
- (3:45) WCU – David Hulbert 9-yard pass from Taron Dickens, Marcus Trout kick (Drive: 5 plays, 89 yards, 1:24; Western Carolina 28–3)
- (0:17) CAM – Kamden Sixkiller 12-yard run, Alex Crabb kick (Drive: 12 plays, 83 yards, 3:19; Western Carolina 28–10)

Third Quarter

- (11:11) WCU – Patrick Boyd Jr. 10-yard pass from Taron Dickens, Marcus Trout kick (Drive: 4 plays, 34 yards, 2:07; Western Carolina 35–10)
- (7:08) CAM – Mike Chandler II 10-yard run, Trevor Wilson pass (Drive: 9 plays, 75 yards, 4:03; Western Carolina 35–18)

Fourth Quarter

- (13:12) CAM – Alex Crabb 21-yard field goal (Drive: 7 plays, 66 yards, 3:15; Western Carolina 35–21)
- (4:58) CAM – Stevie Keener 26-yard pass from Kamden Sixkiller, Alex Crabb kick (Drive: 6 plays, 62 yards, 2:04; Western Carolina 35–28)
- (4:19) WCU – Painter Richards-Baker 61-yard pass from James Tyre, Marcus Trout kick (Drive: 2 plays, 75 yards, 0:39; Western Carolina 42–28)
- (2:11) CAM – Kamden Sixkiller 5-yard run, Alex Crabb kick (Drive: 8 plays, 65 yards, 2:08; Western Carolina 42–35)

Statistics	WCU	CAM
First downs	27	24
Total yards	564	437
Rushing yards	76	153
Passing yards	488	284
Passing: Comp–Att–Int	27–41–0	20–48–1
Time of possession	23:20	36:40

Team	Category	Player	Statistics
Western Carolina	Passing	Taron Dickens	26/40, 427 yards, 4 TD
Western Carolina	Rushing	Camury Reid	11 carries, 43 yards, TD
Western Carolina	Receiving	James Tyre	6 receptions, 101 yards
Campbell	Passing	Kamden Sixkiller	18/45, 205 yards, TD, INT
Campbell	Rushing	Kamden Sixkiller	10 carries, 55 yards, 2 TD
Campbell	Receiving	Trayjen Llanas-Wilcox	5 receptions, 124 yards

=== at NC State (FBS) ===
Campbell Fighting Camels (1-4) at NC State Wolfpack (FBS) (3-2) – Game summary

Quarter	1	2	3	4	Total
Fighting Camels	7	0	0	3	10
Wolfpack (FBS)	21	28	7	0	56

at Carter-Finley Stadium • Raleigh, NC

- Date: October 4
- Game time: 2:00 p.m. EDT
- Game weather: Sunny
- Game attendance: 56,919
- Referee: Nate Black
- TV announcers (ESPN+/ACCNX): Jorge Sedano (play-by-play), Rodney McLeod (analyst) and Victoria Arlen (sideline)

Game information

First quarter

- NCSU – Will Wilson 2-yard run (Kanoah Vinesett kick), 13:03. Wolfpack 7–0. Drive: 5 plays, 75 yards, 1:57.
- CAM – Mike Chandler II 13-yard pass from Kamden Sixkiller (Alex Crabb kick), 8:54. Tied 7–7. Drive: 2 plays, 14 yards, 0:46.
- NCSU – Hollywood Smothers 59-yard run (Kanoah Vinesett kick), 8:13. Wolfpack 14–7. Drive: 2 plays, 75 yards, 0:41.
- NCSU – Cody Hardy 37-yard pass from CJ Bailey (Kanoah Vinesett kick), 2:48. Wolfpack 21–7. Drive: 5 plays, 66 yards, 1:55.

Second quarter

- NCSU – Hollywood Smothers 16-yard pass from CJ Bailey (Kanoah Vinesett kick), 13:45. Wolfpack 28–7. Drive: 4 plays, 51 yards, 2:26.
- NCSU – Terrell Anderson 34-yard pass from CJ Bailey (Kanoah Vinesett kick), 8:33. Wolfpack 35–7. Drive: 5 plays, 74 yards, 1:58.
- NCSU – Jayden Scott 14-yard run (Kanoah Vinesett kick), 2:28. Wolfpack 42–7. Drive: 7 plays, 88 yards, 3:34.
- NCSU – Justin Joly 10-yard pass from CJ Bailey (Kanoah Vinesett kick), 0:43. Wolfpack 49–7. Drive: 3 plays, 68 yards, 1:01.

Third quarter

- NCSU – Jayden Scott 2-yard run (Kanoah Vinesett kick), 6:06. Wolfpack 56–7. Drive: 9 plays, 57 yards, 4:30.

Fourth quarter

- CAM – Alex Crabb 46-yard field goal, 4:09. Wolfpack 56–10. Drive: 4 plays, 12 yards, 2:09.

Statistics	CAM	NCSU
First downs	13	28
Plays–yards	65–188	60–607
Rushes–yards	33–67	26–236
Passing yards	121	371
Passing: comp–att–int	20–32–0	25–34–1
Turnovers	0	2
Time of possession	33:00	27:00

Team	Category	Player	Statistics
Campbell	Passing	Kamden Sixkiller	12/22, 87 yards, TD
Campbell	Rushing	JJ Cowan	12 carries, 48 yards
Campbell	Receiving	Mike Chandler II	2 receptions, 24 yards, TD
NC State	Passing	CJ Bailey	20/23, 337 yards, 4 TD
NC State	Rushing	Hollywood Smothers	4 carries, 123 yards, TD
NC State	Receiving	Noah Rogers	3 receptions, 62 yards

=== at Hampton ===
Campbell Fighting Camels (1-5) vs. Hampton Pirates (2-4) – Game summary

Quarter	1	2	3	4	Total
Fighting Camels	0	10	21	7	38
Pirates	0	14	0	7	21

at Armstrong Stadium • Hampton, VA

- Date: October 11
- Game time: 2:00 PM EDT
- Game weather: Cloudy, 70 degrees
- Game attendance: 3,358
- Referee: Justin Ackley
- TV announcers (FloFootball): Nathan Epstein (play-by-play), Terence Green (analyst) and Kylee Quinn (sideline)

Statistics	CAM	HAMP
First downs		
Total yards		
Rushing yards		
Passing yards		
Passing: Comp–Att–Int		
Time of possession		

Team	Category	Player	Statistics
Campbell	Passing		
Campbell	Rushing		
Campbell	Receiving		
Hampton	Passing		
Hampton	Rushing		
Hampton	Receiving		

=== New Hampshire ===
New Hampshire Wildcats (3–4) at Campbell Fighting Camels (2–5) – Game summary

Quarter	1	2	3	4	Total
Wildcats	0	6	3	15	24
Fighting Camels	0	3	7	0	10

at Barker–Lane Stadium • Buies Creek, NC

- Date: October 18
- Game time: 3:30 PM EDT
- Game weather: Sunny • Temperature: 80 °F (27 °C) • Wind: N at 6 miles per hour (9.7 km/h)
- Game attendance: 4,369
- Referee: Alex Parrella
- TV announcers (FloFootball): Chris Hemeyer (play-by-play) and Andy Bowman (analyst)

Game information

First quarter

- No scoring plays.

Second quarter

- UNH – Nick Reed 36-yard field goal, 6:11. Wildcats 3–0. Drive: 16 plays, 48 yards, 9:41.
- CAM – Alex Crabb 25-yard field goal, 1:09. Tied 3–3. Drive: 9 plays, 66 yards, 5:02.
- UNH – Nick Reed 50-yard field goal, 0:00. Wildcats 6–3. Drive: 9 plays, 33 yards, 1:09.

Third quarter

- UNH – Nick Reed 37-yard field goal, 11:20. Wildcats 9–3. Drive: 6 plays, 47 yards, 2:16.
- CAM – JJ Cowan 9-yard run (Alex Crabb kick), 9:05. Fighting Camels 10–9. Drive: 4 plays, 75 yards, 2:15.

Fourth quarter

- UNH – Myles Thomason 4-yard pass from Matt Vezza (Matt Vezza–Caleb Burke pass), 8:30. Wildcats 17–10. Drive: 9 plays, 57 yards, 4:29.
- UNH – Matt Vezza 6-yard run (Nick Reed kick), 1:48. Wildcats 24–10. Drive: 1 play, 6 yards, 0:05.

Statistics	UNH	CAM
First downs	20	7
Plays–yards	72–370	40–225
Rushes–yards	32–140	29–92
Passing yards	230	133
Passing: Comp–Att–Int	24–40–0	8–11–0
Turnovers	0	1
Time of possession	38:17	21:43

Team	Category	Player	Statistics
New Hampshire	Passing	Matt Vezza	24/40, 230 yards, TD
New Hampshire	Rushing	Myles Thomason	17 carries, 75 yards
New Hampshire	Receiving	Caleb Burke	6 receptions, 85 yards
Campbell	Passing	Mike Chandler II	8/11, 133 yards
Campbell	Rushing	JJ Cowan	13 carries, 54 yards, TD
Campbell	Receiving	Daniel Lopes	3 receptions, 88 yards

=== at North Carolina A&T ===
Campbell Fighting Camels (2-6) vs. North Carolina A&T Aggies (1-6) – Game summary

Quarter	1	2	3	4	Total
Fighting Camels	7	7	0	10	24
Aggies	7	0	0	21	28

at Truist Stadium • Greensboro, NC

- Date: October 25
- Game time: 1:00 PM EDT
- Game weather: Clear • Temperature: 60 °F (16 °C) • Wind: NE at 9 miles per hour (14 km/h)
- Game attendance: 7,468
- Referee: Anthony Florio
- TV announcers (FloFootball): Spencer Turkin (play-by-play), Damieon Banks (analyst) and Reiven Douglas (sideline)

Statistics	CAM	NCAT
First downs		
Total yards		
Rushing yards		
Passing yards		
Passing: Comp–Att–Int		
Time of possession		

Team	Category	Player	Statistics
Campbell	Passing		
Campbell	Rushing		
Campbell	Receiving		
North Carolina A&T	Passing		
North Carolina A&T	Rushing		
North Carolina A&T	Receiving		

=== William & Mary ===
William & Mary Tribe (5-4) vs. Campbell Fighting Camels (2-7) – Game summary

Quarter	1	2	3	4	OT	Total
Tribe	3	10	0	11	6	30
Fighting Camels	7	10	7	0	3	27

at Barker–Lane Stadium • Buies Creek, NC

- Date: November 8
- Game time: 2:00 PM EST

Statistics	W&M	CAM
First downs		
Total yards		
Rushing yards		
Passing yards		
Passing: Comp–Att–Int		
Time of possession		

Team	Category	Player	Statistics
William & Mary	Passing		
William & Mary	Rushing		
William & Mary	Receiving		
Campbell	Passing		
Campbell	Rushing		
Campbell	Receiving		

=== Elon ===
Elon Phoenix (0-0) vs. Campbell Fighting Camels (0-0) – Game summary

Quarter	1	2	3	4	Total
Phoenix	-	-	-	-	0
Fighting Camels	-	-	-	-	0

at Barker–Lane Stadium • Buies Creek, NC

- Date: November 15
- Game time: 2:00 PM EST

Statistics	ELON	CAM
First downs		
Total yards		
Rushing yards		
Passing yards		
Passing: Comp–Att–Int		
Time of possession		

Team	Category	Player	Statistics
Elon	Passing		
Elon	Rushing		
Elon	Receiving		
Campbell	Passing		
Campbell	Rushing		
Campbell	Receiving		

=== at Towson ===
Campbell Fighting Camels (0-0) vs. Towson Tigers (0-0) – Game summary

Quarter	1	2	3	4	Total
Fighting Camels	-	-	-	-	0
Tigers	-	-	-	-	0

at Johnny Unitas Stadium • Towson, MD

- Date: November 22
- Game time: 1:00 PM EST

Statistics	CAM	TOW
First downs		
Total yards		
Rushing yards		
Passing yards		
Passing: Comp–Att–Int		
Time of possession		

Team	Category	Player	Statistics
Campbell	Passing		
Campbell	Rushing		
Campbell	Receiving		
Towson	Passing		
Towson	Rushing		
Towson	Receiving		
