= 2025 New Hampshire Wildcats football team =

American college football season

2025 New Hampshire Wildcats football

NCAA Division I First Round, L 3–41 vs. South Dakota State
- Conference: CAA Football

Ranking
- STATS: No. 23
- Record: 8–5 (6–2 CAA)
- Head coach: Ricky Santos (5th season)
- Co-offensive coordinators: Ed Borden (2nd season); Drew Belcher (2nd season)
- Defensive coordinator: Garrett Gillick (4th season)
- Home stadium: Wildcat Stadium

2025 Coastal Athletic Association Football Conference standings
	Conf.			Overall
Team	W		L	W		L
No. 11 Rhode Island $^	8	–	0	11	–	3
No. 4т Villanova ^	7	–	1	12	–	3
No. 23 New Hampshire ^	6	–	2	8	–	5
No. 22 Monmouth	6	–	2	9	–	3
William & Mary	6	–	2	7	–	5
Maine	5	–	3	6	–	6
Elon	4	–	4	6	–	6
Stony Brook	4	–	4	6	–	6
Towson	4	–	4	6	–	6
North Carolina A&T	2	–	6	2	–	10
Campbell	2	–	6	2	–	10
Bryant	1	–	7	3	–	9
Albany	1	–	7	2	–	10
Hampton	0	–	8	2	–	10
$ – Conference champion; ^ – FCS playoff participant; Rankings from STATS Poll

The 2025 New Hampshire Wildcats football team represented the University of New Hampshire as a member of the Coastal Athletic Association Football Conference (CAA) in the 2025 NCAA Division I FCS football season. The Wildcats were led by fifth-year head coach Ricky Santos, (Note: Santos also served as interim-head coach for the 2019 season.) and played their home games at Wildcat Stadium.

== Roster ==
2025 New Hampshire Wildcats football team roster
Players
Coaches
Offense

Pos.	#	Name	Class
WR	0	Noah Cundiff	Jr
WR	1	Casey McKinney	Sr
QB	4	Tommy McLeish	So
WR	6	Chase Wilson	GS
QB	7	Brooks Bentley	Jr
WR	8	Caleb Burke	Sr
QB	9	Matt Vezza	So
WR	10	Jalen Johnson	Jr
QB	11	Barry Kleinpeter	Jr
QB	12	Matt Festa	So
WR	13	Dom Herling	So
WR	16	Josh Fillion	Jr
WR	17	Logan Perez	So
WR	18	Wakeem Page	So
WR	19	Ryan Blagg	So
WR	21	Sam Brecker	Jr
RB	23	Myles Thompson	Sr
RB	28	Elliot Meine	So
RB	29	Denzell Gibson	So
RB	31	Nino Iacovino	Jr
TE	44	Denin Limouris	Sr
OL	55	Tolu Olajide	GS
OL	58	Nate Cavanaugh	So
OL	59	Ricardo Fernandes	So
OL	61	Tyler Habersham	So
OL	63	Dillon Epperson	So
OL	64	Brendan Graham	Jr
OL	66	Chris Campanelli	Jr
OL	68	Nathan Roach	Jr
OL	70	Jack Wilson	Jr
OL	71	Jason Trotta	So
OL	73	Anthony DiMenna	So
OL	74	Luke Swaine	Jr
OL	75	Beau Riley	Jr
OL	76	Dylan Maciulewicz	Sr
OL	77	Dominick Laudicina	So
OL	79	Luke Rogers	So
WR	83	DaMontre Patterson	So
TE	85	Colby Ramshaw	Jr
TE	86	Peyton Strickland	Jr
TE	87	Jacob Metivier	So
TE	88	Drew Danson	Jr
WR	89	Will Tracey	Jr
OL	91	Ty Miles	So

Defense

Pos.	#	Name	Class
LB	0	Isaiah Jones	So
CB	1	Zeroun Skinner	Sr
CB	4	Tavian Williams	So
DE	5	Jordan Mcallister	So
S	6	Eric Lee	So
S	8	Jackson Downey	So
DT	9	Cameron Garner-Young	Jr
S	10	Cohen Cook	So
S	12	Jackson Stone	Jr
S	14	Duncan Moreland	GS
DE	15	D.J. Johnson	So
DE	17	Zach Garron	Sr
S	18	Josh Farquharson	So
CB	21	Sean Webb	So
S	27	Brendan Tighe	GS
CB	38	Malik Diaby	So
LB	42	Trevor Barry	So
CB	45	Cameron Rumelhart	Jr
LB	50	Matthew Sopp	So
DL	78	Jake Cuddire	Jr
DE	81	Huck Flanagan	Jr
DT	90	Justin Fevrier	Jr
DL	91	T.J. Wyman	So
DE	92	Ethan Aghakhan	Fr
DT	93	Tim Bonagura	Sr
DL	94	Chief Ebana	So
DT	95	Kenyatta Forbes Jr.	So
DE	96	T.J Farrell	Jr
DT	98	Justice Akinmoladun	GS
DE	99	Luke Teskey V	Jr

Special teams

Pos.	#	Name	Class
K	25	Charles Trentham	Jr
LS	46	Wyatt Rubinoff	So
P/K	47	Matt Guidebeck	So
K	53	Dillon Schlopy	So
K	97	Greg Motorny	So

Head coach

- Ricky Santos

Coordinators/assistant coaches

- Scott James – Associate head coach/Defensive Coordinator
- Ed Borden - Co-offensive coordinator/Tight ends
- Ryan Wilson -Co-offensive coordinator/Offensive linemen
- Tommy Herion -Quarterbacks
- Charles Watkins -Wide receivers/Pass game coordinator
- Nick Della Jacono -Linebackers/Special teams coordinator
- Jaysen Thompson -Defensive linemen
- Ryan VanSchelven -Running backs
- Isaiah Gilmore -Nickels

Legend

- (C) Team captain
- (S) Suspended
- (I) Ineligible
- Injured
- Redshirt

Roster
Last update: 6/5/25

== Schedule ==
Date	Time	Opponent	Rank	Site	TV	Result	Attendance
August 30	6:00 p.m.	at North Carolina Central*		O'Kelly–Riddick Stadium; Durham, NC	ESPN+	W 27–10	6,354
September 6	6:00 p.m.	Holy Cross*		Wildcat Stadium; Durham, NH	FloFootball	W 19–16	6,509
September 13	2:00 p.m.	at Ball State*	No. 23	Scheumann Stadium; Muncie, IN	ESPN+	L 29–34	10,512
September 20	1:00 p.m.	at Dartmouth*	No. 25	Memorial Field; Hanover, NH (rivalry)	ESPN+	L 20–27	4,457
September 27	1:00 p.m.	Albany		Wildcat Stadium; Durham, NH	FloFootball	W 24–6	5,691
October 4	1:00 p.m.	No. 18 Villanova		Wildcat Stadium; Durham, NH	FoFootball	L 7–37	7,302
October 11	1:00 p.m.	at No. 17 Rhode Island		Meade Stadium; Kingston, RI	FloFootball	L 27–38	5,192
October 18	3:30 p.m.	at Campbell		Barker–Lane Stadium; Buies Creek, NC	FloFootball	W 24−10	4,369
October 25	1:00 p.m.	William & Mary		Widcat Stadium; Durham, NH	FloFootball	W 34–24	9,835
November 8	12:00 p.m.	at No. 7 Monmouth		Kessler Field; West Long Branch, NJ	FloFootball	W 34–13	3,127
November 15	12:00 p.m.	at Bryant		Beirne Stadium; Smithfield, RI	FloFootball	W 42–14	1,007
November 22	1:00 p.m.	Maine	No. 25	Widcat Stadium; Durham, NH (Battle for the Brice–Cowell Musket)	FloFootball	W 33–27	6,876
November 29	12:00 p.m.	at No. 16 South Dakota State*	No. 22	Dana J. Dykhouse Stadium; Brookings, SD (NCAA Division I First Round)	ESPN+	L 3–41	3,843
*Non-conference game; Rankings from STATS Poll released prior to the game; All times are in Eastern time

== Game summaries ==
=== at North Carolina Central ===
New Hampshire Wildcats (0–0) at North Carolina Central Eagles (1–0) – Game summary

Quarter	1	2	3	4	Total
Wildcats	0	10	14	3	27
Eagles	0	3	7	0	10

at O'Kelly–Riddick Stadium • Durham, NC

- Date: August 30
- Game time: 6:00 p.m.
- Game attendance: 6,354
- Referee: Derek Hatten
- TV announcers (ESPN+): Justin McIsaac (play-by-play) and Brian Espanet (analyst)

Game information

First quarter

- No scoring plays.

Second quarter

- UNH – Nick Reed 29-yard field goal, 9:17. Wildcats 3–0. Drive: 11 plays, 49 yards, 6:20.
- UNH – Denin Limouris 4-yard pass from Matt Vezza (Nick Reed kick), 3:00. Wildcats 10–0. Drive: 8 plays, 49 yards, 4:13.
- NCCU – Kaleb Robison 35-yard field goal, 0:10. Wildcats 10–3. Drive: 13 plays, 57 yards, 2:50.

Third quarter

- UNH – Matt Vezza 8-yard run (Nick Reed kick BLOCKED), 6:40. Wildcats 16–3. Drive: 7 plays, 65 yards, 3:06.
- UNH – Peyton Strickland 65-yard pass from Matt Vezza (Matt Vezza–Colby Ramshaw pass), 1:22. Wildcats 24–3. Drive: 4 plays, 56 yards, 1:17.
- NCCU – Mekhi Wall 65-yard pass from Walker Harris (Kaleb Robison kick), 0:36. Wildcats 24–10. Drive: 2 plays, 77 yards, 0:41.

Fourth quarter

- UNH – Nick Reed 39-yard field goal, 5:32. Wildcats 27–10. Drive: 4 plays, 8 yards, 0:25.

Statistics	UNH	NCCU
First downs	14	16
Plays–yards	56–304	63–275
Rushes–yards	39–118	30–103
Passing yards	186	172
Passing: Comp–Att–Int	10–17–1	13–33–1
Turnovers	0	1
Time of possession	34:52	25:08

Team	Category	Player	Statistics
New Hampshire	Passing	Matt Vezza	10/17, 186 yards, 2 TD
New Hampshire	Rushing	Myles Thomason	22 carries, 76 yards
New Hampshire	Receiving	Caleb Burke	5 receptions, 78 yards
North Carolina Central	Passing	Walker Harris	13/33, 172 yards, TD, INT
North Carolina Central	Rushing	Chris Mosley	19 carries, 106 yards
North Carolina Central	Receiving	Mekhi Wall	1 reception, 65 yards, TD

=== Holy Cross ===
Holy Cross Crusaders (0–1) at New Hampshire Wildcats (1–0) – Game summary

Quarter	1	2	3	4	Total
Crusaders	9	0	0	7	16
Wildcats	7	3	3	6	19

at Wildcat Stadium • Durham, NH

- Date: September 6
- Game time: 6:00 PM EDT
- Game attendance: 6,509
- Referee: Jeremy DeAngulo
- TV announcers (FloFootball): Ben Altsher (play-by-play) and Evan Gray (analyst)

Game information

First quarter

- HC – Eli Thompson 24-yard interception return (Luis Palenzuela kick BLOCKED), 13:29. Crusaders 6–0.
- UNH – Josh Fillion 53-yard pass from Caleb Burke (Nick Reed kick), 13:16. Wildcats 7–6. Drive: 1 play, 53 yards, 0:08.
- HC – Luis Palenzuela 34-yard field goal, 7:39. Crusaders 9–7. Drive: 12 plays, 58 yards, 5:37.

Second quarter

- UNH – Nick Reed 33-yard field goal, 0:00. Wildcats 10–9. Drive: 7 plays, 48 yards, 3:22.

Third quarter

- UNH – Nick Reed 30-yard field goal, 2:05. Wildcats 13–9. Drive: 7 plays, 52 yards, 3:34.

Fourth quarter

- HC – Jayden Clerveaux 1-yard run (Luis Palenzuela kick), 12:13. Crusaders 16–13. Drive: 9 plays, 67 yards, 4:47.
- UNH – Nick Reed 50-yard field goal, 9:13. Tied 16–16. Drive: 6 plays, 41 yards, 9:05.
- UNH – Nick Reed 40-yard field goal, 0:00. Wildcats 19–16. Drive: 9 plays, 58 yards, 1:40.

Statistics	HC	UNH
First downs	18	14
Plays–yards	58–251	54–279
Rushes–yards	43–156	31–97
Passing yards	95	182
Passing: Comp–Att–Int	8–15–1	12–23–2
Turnovers	1	2
Time of possession	31:12	28:48

Team	Category	Player	Statistics
Holy Cross	Passing	Cal Swanson	8/15, 95 yards, INT
Holy Cross	Rushing	Jayden Clerveaux	18 carries, 66 yards, TD
Holy Cross	Receiving	Max Mosey	4 receptions, 56 yards
New Hampshire	Passing	Matt Vezza	11/21, 129 yards, 2 INT
New Hampshire	Rushing	Myles Thomason	19 carries, 46 yards
New Hampshire	Receiving	Josh Fillion	2 receptions, 57 yards

=== at Ball State (FBS) ===
No. 23 New Hampshire Wildcats (2-0) at Ball State Cardinals (FBS) (0-2) – Game summary

Quarter	1	2	3	4	Total
No. 23 Wildcats	14	7	3	5	29
Cardinals (FBS)	14	14	6	0	34

at Scheumann Stadium • Muncie, IN

- Date: September 13
- Game time: 2:00 PM EDT
- Game weather: Rain • Temperature: 81 °F (27 °C) • Wind: SW at 6 miles per hour (9.7 km/h)
- Game attendance: 10,512
- Referee: Rick Warne
- TV announcers (ESPN+): Jack Kizer (play-by-play) and Ryan Cavanaugh (analyst)

Game information

First quarter

- UNH – Brendan Tighe 30-yard blocked punt return (Nick Reed kick), 13:53. Wildcats 7–0.
- BALL – Kiael Kelly 40-yard run (Carson Holmer kick), 10:48. Tied 7–7. Drive: 6 plays, 69 yards, 2:57.
- UNH – Chase Wilson 13-yard pass from Matt Vezza (Nick Reed kick), 5:22. Wildcats 14–7. Drive: 10 plays, 75 yards, 5:27.
- BALL – Qua Ashley 43-yard run (Carson Holmer kick), 4:29. Tied 14–14. Drive: 2 plays, 64 yards, 0:53.

Second quarter

- BALL – Qua Ashley 72-yard run (Carson Holmer kick), 7:12. Cardinals 21–14. Drive: 2 plays, 80 yards, 0:42.
- UNH – Matt Vezza 2-yard run (Nick Reed kick), 1:47. Tied 21–21. Drive: 13 plays, 75 yards, 5:25.
- BALL – Kameron Anthony 10-yard pass from Kiael Kelly (Carson Holmer kick), 0:20. Cardinals 28–21. Drive: 7 plays, 75 yards, 1:27.

Third quarter

- BALL – Qua Ashley 27-yard pass from Kiael Kelly (pass failed), 9:56. Cardinals 34–21. Drive: 8 plays, 74 yards, 4:02.
- UNH – Nick Reed 52-yard field goal, 3:46. Cardinals 34–24. Drive: 13 plays, 59 yards, 6:04.

Fourth quarter

- UNH – Team Safety, 8:10. Cardinals 34–26.
- UNH – Nick Reed 29-yard field goal, 4:16. Cardinals 34–29. Drive: 7 plays, 49 yards, 3:46.

Statistics	UNH	BALL
First downs	22	21
Plays–yards	79–391	51–413
Rushes–yards	34–132	36–308
Passing yards	259	105
Passing: Comp–Att–Int	25–45–0	9–15–1
Turnovers	0	2
Time of possession	38:05	21:55

Team	Category	Player	Statistics
New Hampshire	Passing	Matt Vezza	25/44, 259 yards, TD
New Hampshire	Rushing	Matt Vezza	16 carries, 78 yards, TD
New Hampshire	Receiving	Caleb Burke	7 receptions, 89 yards
Ball State	Passing	Kiael Kelly	9/15, 105 yards, 2 TD, INT
Ball State	Rushing	Qua Ashley	12 carries, 154 yards, 2 TD
Ball State	Receiving	Qua Ashley	2 receptions, 33 yards, TD

=== at Dartmouth (rivalry) ===
No. 25 New Hampshire Wildcats (2–1) at Dartmouth Big Green (0–0) – Game summary

Quarter	1	2	3	4	Total
No. 25 Wildcats	10	0	3	7	20
Big Green	0	7	6	14	27

at Memorial Field • Hanover, NH

- Date: September 20
- Game time: 1:00 p.m. EDT
- Game weather: Sunny • Temperature: 65 °F (18 °C) • Wind: N at 10 miles per hour (16 km/h)
- Game attendance: 4,457
- Referee: Antonio Marcella
- TV announcers (ESPN+): Bob Lipman (play-by-play)

Game information

First quarter

- UNH - Matt Vezza 1-yard run (Nick Reed kick), 9:03. Wildcats 7-0. Drive: 5 plays, 13 yards, 2:38.
- UNH - Nick Reed 32-yard field goal, 1:00. Wildscats 10-0. Drive: 7 plays, 46 yards, 3:23.

Second quarter

- DART - D.J. Crowther 4-yard run (Owen Zalc kick), 11:27. Wildcats 10-7. Drive: 9 plays, 75 yards, 4:33

Third quarter

- DART - D.J. Crowther 16-yard run (Owen Zalc kick failed), 9:45. Big Green 13-10. Drive: 6 plays, 53 yards, 2:50.
- UNH - Nick Reed 52-yard field goal, 3:21. Tied 13-13. Drive: 13, 41 yards, 6:17.

Fourth quarter

- DART - D.J. Crowther 33-yard run (pass failed), 10:05. Big Green 19-13. Drive: 8 plays, 87 yards, 4:07.
- UNH - Chase Wilson 38-yard pass from Matt Vezza (Nick Reed kick), 7:43. Wildcats 20-19. Drive: 4 plays, 68 yards, 2:14.
- DART - Grayson Saunier 1-yard run (Grayson Saunier run), 2:53. Big Green 27-20. Drive: 9 plays, 75 yards, 4:50.

Statistics	UNH	DART
First downs	17	21
Plays–yards	64–361	63–432
Rushes–yards	29–88	33–188
Passing yards	273	244
Passing: Comp–Att–Int	22–35–2	22–30–1
Turnovers	2	1
Time of possession	27:57	32:03

Team	Category	Player	Statistics
New Hampshire	Passing	Matt Vezza	22/35, 273 yards, TD, 2 INT
New Hampshire	Rushing	Matt Vezza	13 carries, 33 yards, TD
New Hampshire	Receiving	Chase Wilson	6 receptions, 120 yards, TD
Dartmouth	Passing	Grayson Saunier	22/30, 244 yards, INT
Dartmouth	Rushing	D.J. Crowther	20 carries, 143 yards, 3 TD
Dartmouth	Receiving	Grayson O'Bara	6 receptions, 106 yards

=== Albany ===
Albany Great Danes (1–3) at New Hampshire Wildcats (2–2) – Game summary

Quarter	1	2	3	4	Total
Great Danes	0	0	0	6	6
Wildcats	7	7	7	3	24

at Wildcat Stadium • Durham, NH

- Date: September 27
- Game time: 1:00 PM EDT
- Game weather: Sunny
- Game attendance: 5,691
- Referee: Justin Ackley
- TV announcers (FloFootball): Joe Weil (play-by-play) and Pete Webster (analyst)

Game information

First quarter

- UNH – Denzell Gibson 1-yard run (Nick Reed kick), 7:10. Wildcats 7-0. Drive: 15 plays, 75 yards, 7:50

Second quarter

- UNH – Ryan Blagg 6-yard pass from Matt Vezza (Nick Reed kick), 0:28. Wildcats 14-0. Drive: 16 plays, 91 yards, 8:06

Third quarter

- UNH – Matt Vezza 3-yard run (Nick Reed kick), 5:24. Wildcats 21-0. Drive: 12 plays, 97 yards, 7:08

Fourth quarter

- UNH – Nick Reed 47-yard field goal, 8:29. Wildcats 24-0. Drive: 4 plays, -14 yards, 2:08
- ALB – Alex Jreige 6-yard pass from Colin Parachek, 3:08. Wildcats 24-6. Drive: 14 plays, 86 yards, 5:16

Statistics	ALB	UNH
First downs	19	17
Plays–yards	66–275	64–308
Rushes–yards	24–94	40–118
Passing yards	181	190
Passing: Comp–Att–Int	21–42–1	19–24–0
Turnovers	1	0
Time of possession	25:40	34:20

Team	Category	Player	Statistics
Albany	Passing	Colin Parachek	21/42, 181 yards, TD, INT
Albany	Rushing	Colin Parachek	9 carries, 33 yards
Albany	Receiving	Kylen Austin	4 receptions, 56 yards
New Hampshire	Passing	Matt Vezza	19/24, 190 yards, TD
New Hampshire	Rushing	Myles Thomason	16 carries, 77 yards
New Hampshire	Receiving	Chase Wilson	4 receptions, 74 yards

=== No. 18 Villanova ===
No. 18 Villanova Wildcats (2–2) at New Hampshire Wildcats (3–2) – Game summary

Quarter	1	2	3	4	Total
No. 18 Villanova	7	17	0	13	37
New Hampshire	7	0	0	0	7

at Wildcat Stadium • Durham, NH

- Date: October 4
- Game time: 1:00 PM EDT
- Game weather: Sunny
- Game attendance: 7,302
- Referee: Matt Overton
- TV: FloFootball

Game information

First quarter

- VILL – David Avit 34-yard run (Jack Barnum kick), 12:38. Villanova 7–0. Drive: 1 play, 34 yards, 0:07.
- UNH – Matt Vezza 35-yard run (Nick Reed kick), 10:08. Tied 7–7. Drive: 4 plays, 75 yards, 2:30.

Second quarter

- VILL – Ja'briel Mace 31-yard run (Jack Barnum kick), 14:53. Villanova 14–7. Drive: 7 plays, 73 yards, 3:13.
- VILL – Ja'briel Mace 2-yard run (Jack Barnum kick), 9:32. Villanova 21–7. Drive: 7 plays, 60 yards, 2:59.
- VILL – Jack Barnum 27-yard field goal, 0:35. Villanova 24–7. Drive: 11 plays, 79 yards, 1:36.

Third quarter

- No scoring plays.

Fourth quarter

- VILL – Ja'briel Mace 1-yard run (Jack Barnum kick), 12:48. Villanova 31–7. Drive: 14 plays, 80 yards, 7:49.
- VILL – Isaiah Wright 3-yard run (Jack Barnum kick failed), 1:54. Villanova 37–7. Drive: 14 plays, 63 yards, 8:59.

Statistics	VILL	UNH
First downs	28	13
Plays–yards	68–461	48–207
Rushes–yards	42–238	24–89
Passing yards	223	118
Passing: Comp–Att–Int	17-26-0	13-24-1
Turnovers	0	1
Time of possession	33:46	26:14

Team	Category	Player	Statistics
Villanova	Passing	Pat McQuaide	16/25, 219 yards
Villanova	Rushing	David Avit	14 carries, 102 yards, TD
Villanova	Receiving	Luke Colella	9 receptions, 139 yards
New Hampshire	Passing	Matt Vezza	13/23, 118 yards, INT
New Hampshire	Rushing	Matt Vezza	10 carries, 48 yards, TD
New Hampshire	Receiving	Chase Wilson	3 receptions, 50 yards

=== at No. 17 Rhode Island ===
New Hampshire Wildcats (3–3) at No. 17 Rhode Island Rams (4–2) – Game summary

Quarter	1	2	3	4	Total
Wildcats	7	7	13	0	27
No. 17 Rams	0	17	0	21	38

at Meade Stadium • Kingston, RI

- Date: October 11
- Game time: 1:00 PM EDT
- Game weather: Sunny
- Game attendance: 5,192
- Referee: Jeff Pumphrey
- TV: FloSports

Game information

First quarter

- UNH – Myles Thomason 5-yard run (Nick Reed kick), 9:55. Wildcats 7–0. Drive: 8 plays, 47 yards, 3:06.

Second quarter

- URI – Antwain Littleton Jr. 3-yard run (Garth White kick), 13:19. Tied 7–7. Drive: 14 plays, 80 yards, 7:14.
- URI – Garth White 45-yard field goal, 3:58. Rams 10–7. Drive: 14 plays, 66 yards, 6:08.
- UNH – Chase Wilson 20-yard pass from Matt Vezza (Nick Reed kick), 1:55. Wildcats 14–10. Drive: 5 plays, 75 yards, 2:03.
- URI – Brendon Barrow 28-yard run (Garth White kick), 0:25. Rams 17–14. Drive: 8 plays, 75 yards, 1:30.

Third quarter

- UNH – Peyton Strickland 2-yard pass from Matt Vezza (Nick Reed kick), 9:12. Wildcats 21–17. Drive: 10 plays, 63 yards, 5:41.
- UNH – Nick Reed 46-yard field goal, 6:50. Wildcats 24–17. Drive: 4 plays, 5 yards, 2:16.
- UNH – Nick Reed 31-yard field goal, 1:46. Wildcats 27–17. Drive: 9 plays, 42 yards, 4:10.

Fourth quarter

- URI – Brendon Barrow 19-yard run (Garth White kick), 13:05. Wildcats 27–24. Drive: 9 plays, 75 yards, 3:41.
- URI – Devin Farrell 16-yard run (Garth White kick), 2:12. Rams 31–27. Drive: 7 plays, 49 yards, 4:08.
- URI – Rohan Davy 0-yard fumble recovery (Garth White kick), 1:05. Rams 38–27.

Statistics	UNH	URI
First downs	20	20
Plays–yards	68–320	64–384
Rushes–yards	36–127	41–220
Passing yards	193	164
Passing: Comp–Att–Int	16–32–0	15–23–1
Turnovers	1	1
Time of possession	31:08	28:52

Team	Category	Player	Statistics
New Hampshire	Passing	Matt Vezza	16/32, 193 yards, 2 TD
New Hampshire	Rushing	Matt Vezza	16 carries, 54 yards
New Hampshire	Receiving	Chase Wilson	5 receptions, 69 yards, TD
Rhode Island	Passing	Devin Farrell	15/23, 164 yards, INT
Rhode Island	Rushing	Brendon Barrow	14 carries, 111 yards, 2 TD
Rhode Island	Receiving	Aboraa Kwarteng	3 receptions, 47 yards

=== at Campbell ===
New Hampshire Wildcats (3–4) at Campbell Fighting Camels (2–5) – Game summary

Quarter	1	2	3	4	Total
Wildcats	0	6	3	15	24
Fighting Camels	0	3	7	0	10

at Barker–Lane Stadium • Buies Creek, NC

- Date: October 18
- Game time: 3:30 PM EDT
- Game weather: Sunny • Temperature: 80 °F (27 °C) • Wind: N at 6 miles per hour (9.7 km/h)
- Game attendance: 4,369
- Referee: Alex Parrella
- TV announcers (FloFootball): Chris Hemeyer (play-by-play) and Andy Bowman (analyst)

Game information

First quarter

- No scoring plays.

Second quarter

- UNH – Nick Reed 36-yard field goal, 6:11. Wildcats 3–0. Drive: 16 plays, 48 yards, 9:41.
- CAM – Alex Crabb 25-yard field goal, 1:09. Tied 3–3. Drive: 9 plays, 66 yards, 5:02.
- UNH – Nick Reed 50-yard field goal, 0:00. Wildcats 6–3. Drive: 9 plays, 33 yards, 1:09.

Third quarter

- UNH – Nick Reed 37-yard field goal, 11:20. Wildcats 9–3. Drive: 6 plays, 47 yards, 2:16.
- CAM – JJ Cowan 9-yard run (Alex Crabb kick), 9:05. Fighting Camels 10–9. Drive: 4 plays, 75 yards, 2:15.

Fourth quarter

- UNH – Myles Thomason 4-yard pass from Matt Vezza (Matt Vezza–Caleb Burke pass), 8:30. Wildcats 17–10. Drive: 9 plays, 57 yards, 4:29.
- UNH – Matt Vezza 6-yard run (Nick Reed kick), 1:48. Wildcats 24–10. Drive: 1 play, 6 yards, 0:05.

Statistics	UNH	CAM
First downs	20	7
Plays–yards	72–370	40–225
Rushes–yards	32–140	29–92
Passing yards	230	133
Passing: Comp–Att–Int	24–40–0	8–11–0
Turnovers	0	1
Time of possession	38:17	21:43

Team	Category	Player	Statistics
New Hampshire	Passing	Matt Vezza	24/40, 230 yards, TD
New Hampshire	Rushing	Myles Thomason	17 carries, 75 yards
New Hampshire	Receiving	Caleb Burke	6 receptions, 85 yards
Campbell	Passing	Mike Chandler II	8/11, 133 yards
Campbell	Rushing	JJ Cowan	13 carries, 54 yards, TD
Campbell	Receiving	Daniel Lopes	3 receptions, 88 yards

=== William & Mary ===
William & Mary Tribe (4-3) vs. New Hampshire Wildcats (4-4) – Game summary

Quarter	1	2	3	4	Total
Tribe	7	7	7	3	24
Wildcats	14	3	14	3	34

at Wildcat Stadium • Durham, NH

- Date: October 25
- Game time: 1:00 PM EDT

Statistics	W&M	UNH
First downs		
Total yards		
Rushing yards		
Passing yards		
Passing: Comp–Att–Int		
Time of possession		

Team	Category	Player	Statistics
William & Mary	Passing		
William & Mary	Rushing		
William & Mary	Receiving		
New Hampshire	Passing		
New Hampshire	Rushing		
New Hampshire	Receiving		

=== at No. 7 Monmouth ===
New Hampshire Wildcats (5–4) at No. 7 Monmouth Hawks (8–1) – Game summary

Quarter	1	2	3	4	Total
Wildcats	0	13	14	7	34
No. 7 Hawks	7	6	0	0	13

at Kessler Field • West Long Branch, NJ

- Date: November 8
- Game time: 12:00 PM EST
- Game weather: Sunny • Temperature: 62 °F (17 °C) • Wind: SE at 10 miles per hour (16 km/h)
- Game attendance: 3,127
- Referee: Todd Boyd
- TV announcers (FloFootball): Matt Harmon (play-by-play), Emory Hunt (analyst) and Jackson Heil (sideline)

Game information

First quarter

- (3:24) MONM – Jack Neri 10-yard pass from Frankie Weaver, Hudson Fiene kick (Drive: 3 plays, 9 yards, 1:14; Monmouth 7-0)

Second quarter

- (11:30) UNH – Matt Vezza 13-yard run, Nick Reed kick (Drive: 5 plays, 62 yards, 2:42; 7-7)
- (2:46) UNH – Nick Reed 31-yard field goal (Drive: 9 plays, 40 yards, 5:52; New Hampshire 10-7)
- (0:44) UNH – Nick Reed 53-yard field goal (Drive: 6 plays, 24 yards, 5:52; New Hampshire 13-7)
- (0:08) MONM – Josh Derry 19-yard pass from Frankie Weaver, two-point run conversion failed (Drive: 5 plays, 75 yards, 0:36; 13-13)

Third quarter

- (8:37) UNH – Myles Thomason 22-yard run, Nick Reed kick (Drive: 10 plays, 75 yards, 6:23; New Hampshire 20-13)
- (7:10) UNH – Denzell Gibson 27-yard pass from Matt Vezza, Nick Reed kick (Drive: 3 plays, 37 yards, 0:56; New Hampshire 27-13)

Fourth quarter

- (4:33) UNH – Ryan Blagg 12-yard pass from Matt Vezza, Nick Reed kick (Drive: 9 plays, 68 yards, 5:24; New Hampshire 34-13)

Statistics	UNH	MONM
First downs	22	17
Plays–yards	69–383	60–304
Rushes–yards	43–197	30–71
Passing yards	186	233
Passing: Comp–Att–Int	17-26-0	20-30-0
Turnovers	1	2
Time of possession	37:28	22:32

Team	Category	Player	Statistics
New Hampshire	Passing	Matt Vezza	16/25, 173 yards, 2 TD
New Hampshire	Rushing	Myles Thomason	21 carries, 95 yards, TD
New Hampshire	Receiving	Chase Wilson	2 receptions, 67 yards
Monmouth	Passing	Frankie Weaver	20/30. 233 yards, 2 TD
Monmouth	Rushing	Rodney Nelson	19 carries, 88 yards
Monmouth	Receiving	TJ Speight	6 receptions, 89 yards

=== at Bryant ===
New Hampshire Wildcats (0-0) vs. Bryant Bulldogs (0-0) – Game summary

Quarter	1	2	3	4	Total
Wildcats	-	-	-	-	0
Bulldogs	-	-	-	-	0

at Beirne Stadium • Smithfield, RI

- Date: November 15
- Game time: 12:00 PM EST

Statistics	UNH	BRY
First downs		
Total yards		
Rushing yards		
Passing yards		
Passing: Comp–Att–Int		
Time of possession		

Team	Category	Player	Statistics
New Hampshire	Passing		
New Hampshire	Rushing		
New Hampshire	Receiving		
Bryant	Passing		
Bryant	Rushing		
Bryant	Receiving		

=== Maine (Battle for the Brice–Cowell Musket) ===
Maine Black Bears (6–5) at No. 25 New Hampshire Wildcats (7–4) – Game summary

Quarter	1	2	3	4	Total
Black Bears	0	7	7	13	27
Wildcats	3	24	0	6	33

at Wildcat Stadium • Durham, NH

- Date: November 22
- Game time: 1:00 PM EST
- Game weather: Cloudy • Temperature: 50 °F (10 °C)
- Game attendance: 6,876
- Referee: Bill McKeever
- TV: FloSports

Game information

First quarter

- UNH – Nick Reed 29-yard field goal, 11:44. Wildcats 3–0. Drive: 6 plays, 64 yards, 3:16.

Second quarter

- UNH – Myles Thomason 1-yard run (Nick Reed kick), 13:20. Wildcats 10–0. Drive: 5 plays, 45 yards, 3:05.
- UNH – Nick Reed 21-yard field goal, 9:49. Wildcats 13–0. Drive: 4 plays, 7 yards, 1:41.
- ME – Carter Peevy 2-yard run (Samuel Tremblay kick), 7:40. Wildcats 13–7. Drive: 5 plays, 75 yards, 2:09.
- UNH – Chase Wilson 8-yard pass from Matt Vezza (Matt Vezza–Josh Fillion pass), 4:19. Wildcats 21–7. Drive: 7 plays, 66 yards, 3:14.
- UNH – Nick Reed 55-yard field goal, 1:47. Wildcats 24–7. Drive: 5 plays, 8 yards, 0:57.
- UNH – Nick Reed 33-yard field goal, 0:00. Wildcats 27–7. Drive: 7 plays, 29 yards, 1:35.

Third quarter

- ME – Trevin Ewing 12-yard pass from Carter Peevy (Samuel Tremblay kick), 12:32. Wildcats 27–14. Drive: 5 plays, 59 yards, 2:22.

Fourth quarter

- ME – Rashawn Marshall 9-yard run (Samuel Tremblay kick), 9:39. Wildcats 27–21. Drive: 8 plays, 80 yards, 5:09.
- UNH – Matt Vezza 10-yard run (pass failed), 1:56. Wildcats 33–21. Drive: 12 plays, 73 yards, 7:42.
- ME – Carter Peevy 62-yard run (Samuel Tremblay kick BLOCKED), 0:39. Wildcats 33–27. Drive: 8 plays, 91 yards, 1:10.

Statistics	ME	UNH
First downs	18	20
Plays–yards	52–369	68–396
Rushes–yards	25–189	40–130
Passing yards	180	266
Passing: Comp–Att–Int	15-27-2	16-28-0
Turnovers	2	0
Time of possession	23:07	36:53

Team	Category	Player	Statistics
Maine	Passing	Carter Peevy	15/27, 180 yards, TD, 2 INT
Maine	Rushing	Carter Peevy	8 carries, 114 yards, 2 TD
Maine	Receiving	Ty'ee Stephens	1 reception, 68 yards
New Hampshire	Passing	Matt Vezza	16/27, 266 yards, TD
New Hampshire	Rushing	Myles Thomason	22 carries, 73 yards, TD
New Hampshire	Receiving	Caleb Burke	1 reception, 63 yards

=== at No. 16 South Dakota State (Division I First Round) ===
2025 NCAA Division I FCS Playoffs First Round
No. 22 New Hampshire Wildcats (8–4) at No. 16 (14) South Dakota State Jackrabbits (8–4) – Game summary

Quarter	1	2	3	4	Total
No. 22 Wildcats	0	3	0	0	3
No. 16 (14) Jackrabbits	14	13	0	14	41

at Dana J. Dykhouse Stadium • Brookings, SD

- Date: November 29
- Game time: 12:00 p.m. MST
- Game weather: Snow • Temperature: 20 °F (−7 °C) • Wind: NE at 10 miles per hour (16 km/h)
- Game attendance: 3,843
- Referee: Matt Beck
- TV: ESPN+

Game information

First quarter

- (11:10) SDST – Julius Loughridge 1-yard run, Eli Stader kick (Drive: 9 plays, 75 yards, 3:50; South Dakota State 7–0)
- (1:04) SDST – Josiah Johnson 1-yard run, Eli Stader kick (Drive: 13 plays, 88 yards, 7:44; South Dakota State 14–0)

Second quarter

- (11:26) SDST – Alex Bullock 7-yard pass from Chase Mason, Eli Stader kick (Drive: 7 plays, 68 yards, 3:21; South Dakota State 21–0)
- (2:53) UNH – Nick Reed 30-yard field goal (Drive: 15 plays, 63 yards, 8:33; South Dakota State 21–3)
- (1:51) SDST – Jack Smith 42-yard pass from Chase Mason, Max Pelham run conversion failed (Drive: 3 plays, 63 yards, 0:56; South Dakota State 27–3)

Third quarter

- No scoring plays.

Fourth quarter

- (14:54) SDST – Coleman Kunts 16-yard pass from Chase Mason, Eli Stader kick (Drive: 7 plays, 30 yards, 2:47; South Dakota State 34–3)
- (3:05) SDST – Andrew Gustad 2-yard pass from Jack Henry, Eli Stader kick (Drive: 14 plays, 56 yards, 8:25; South Dakota State 41–3)

Statistics	UNH	SDST
First downs	12	23
Plays–yards	56–192	61–425
Rushes–yards	33–144	40–193
Passing yards	48	232
Passing: Comp–Att–Int	10–23–1	17–21–1
Turnovers	1	1
Time of possession	28:49	31:11

Team	Category	Player	Statistics
New Hampshire	Passing	Matt Vezza	10/22, 48 yards, INT
New Hampshire	Rushing	Denzell Gibson	19 carries, 106 yards
New Hampshire	Receiving	Peyton Strickland	3 receptions, 15 yards
South Dakota State	Passing	Chase Mason	16/20, 230 yards, 3 TD, INT
South Dakota State	Rushing	Julius Loughridge	16 carries, 100 yards, TD
South Dakota State	Receiving	Grahm Goering	6 receptions, 75 yards
