= 2025 Monmouth Hawks football team =

American college football season

2025 Monmouth Hawks football
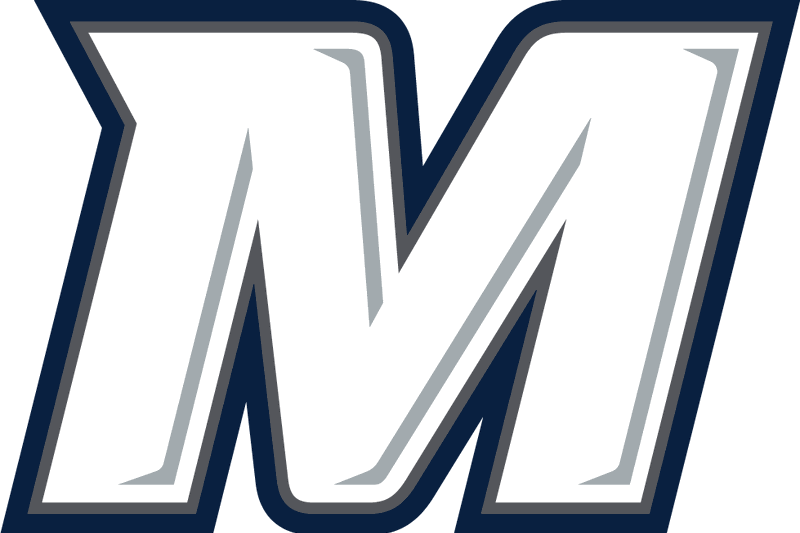
- Conference: CAA Football

Ranking
- STATS: No. 22
- FCS Coaches: No. 20
- Record: 9–3 (6–2 CAA)
- Head coach: Kevin Callahan (33rd season)
- Offensive coordinator: Jeff Gallo (7th season)
- Offensive scheme: Air raid
- Defensive coordinator: Lewis Walker (2nd season)
- Base defense: Multiple
- Home stadium: Kessler Stadium

2025 Coastal Athletic Association Football Conference standings
	Conf.			Overall
Team	W		L	W		L
No. 11 Rhode Island $^	8	–	0	11	–	3
No. 4т Villanova ^	7	–	1	12	–	3
No. 23 New Hampshire ^	6	–	2	8	–	5
No. 22 Monmouth	6	–	2	9	–	3
William & Mary	6	–	2	7	–	5
Maine	5	–	3	6	–	6
Elon	4	–	4	6	–	6
Stony Brook	4	–	4	6	–	6
Towson	4	–	4	6	–	6
North Carolina A&T	2	–	6	2	–	10
Campbell	2	–	6	2	–	10
Bryant	1	–	7	3	–	9
Albany	1	–	7	2	–	10
Hampton	0	–	8	2	–	10
$ – Conference champion; ^ – FCS playoff participant; Rankings from STATS Poll

The 2025 Monmouth Hawks football team represented Monmouth University in the Coastal Athletic Association Football Conference (CAA) during the 2025 NCAA Division I FCS football season. The Hawks are coached by 33rd-year head coach Kevin Callahan and play home games at Kessler Stadium in West Long Branch, New Jersey.

== Schedule ==
Date	Time	Opponent	Rank	Site	TV	Result	Attendance
August 29	7:00 p.m.	at Colgate*	No. 22	Andy Kerr Stadium; Hamilton, NY	ESPN+	W 42–39	3,032
September 6	6:00 p.m.	at Fordham*	No. 21	Coffey Field; The Bronx, NY	ESPN+	W 49–28	2,487
September 13	6:00 p.m.	at Charlotte*	No. 20	Jerry Richardson Stadium; Charlotte, NC	ESPN+	L 35–42	15,681
September 20	1:00 p.m.	No. 11 Villanova	No. 21	Kessler Field; West Long Branch, NJ	FloFootball	W 51–33	4,200
October 4	1:00 p.m.	Delaware State*	No. 14	Kessler Field; West Long Branch, NJ	FloFootball	W 49–38	2,967
October 11	2:00 p.m.	at Towson	No. 12	Johnny Unitas Stadium; Towson, MD	FloFootball	W 42–31	5,487
October 18	1:00 p.m.	Stony Brook^{†}	No. 11	Kessler Field; West Long Branch, NJ	FloFootball	W 49–21	3,198
October 25	2:00 p.m.	at Hampton	No. 10	Armstrong Stadium; Hampton, VA	FloFootball	W 28–10	8,693
November 1	1:00 p.m.	at Bryant	No. 10	Beirne Stadium; Smithfield, RI	FloFootball	W 35–7	2,500
November 8	12:00 p.m.	New Hampshire	No. 7	Kessler Field; West Long Branch, NJ	FloFootball	L 13–34	3,127
November 15	12:00 p.m.	at North Carolina A&T	No. 12	Truist Stadium; Greensboro, NC	FloFootball	W 63–19	5,966
November 22	12:00 p.m.	Albany	No. 12	Kessler Field; West Long Branch, NJ	FloFootball	L 24–31	2,813
*Non-conference game; ^{†}Homecoming; Rankings from STATS Poll released prior to the game; All times are in Eastern time

== Game summaries ==
=== at Colgate ===
No. 22 Monmouth Hawks (0-0) at Colgate Raiders (0-0) – Game summary

Quarter	1	2	3	4	Total
No. 22 Hawks	0	7	14	21	42
Raiders	14	10	7	8	39

at Andy Kerr Stadium • Hamilton, NY

- Date: August 29
- Game time: 7:00 PM EDT
- Game attendance: 3,032
- Referee: Antonio Marcella
- TV announcers (ESPN+): Eric Malanoski (play-by-play), Terry Dow (analyst) and Faith Cain (sideline)

Game information

First quarter

- COLG – Marco Maldonado 4-yard run (Luke Vogeler kick), 10:17. Raiders 7–0. Drive: 5 plays, 80 yards, 1:35.
- COLG – Treyvhon Saunders 13-yard pass from Zach Osborne (Lukle Vogeler kick), 2:39. Raiders 14–0. Drive: 7 plays, 80 yards, 3:16.

Second quarter

- MONM – Tra Neal 13-yard pass from Derek Robertson (Hudson Fiene kick), 13:37. Raiders 14–7. Drive: 11 plays, 80 yards, 3:56.
- COLG – Luke Vogeler 42-yard field goal, 9:20. Raiders 17–7. Drive: 10 plays, 47 yards, 4:09.
- COLG – Treyvhon Saunders 22-yard pass from Zach Osborne (Luke Vogeler kick), 2:57. Raiders 24–7. Drive: 8 plays, 80 yards, 4:10.

Third quarter

- COLG – Brendan Cassamajor 2-yard pass from Jake Stearney (Luke Vogeler kick), 8:23. Raiders 31–7. Drive: 12 plays, 45 yards, 6:37.
- MONM – Gavin Nelson 70-yard pass from Derek Robertson (Derek Robertson–Josh Derry pass), 7:15. Raiders 31–14. Drive: 3 plays, 80 yards, 0:45.
- MONM – Rodney Nelson 1-yard run (pass failed), 3:27. Raiders 31–21. Drive: 7 plays, 74 yards, 2:02.

Fourth quarter

- MONM – Gavin Nelson 24-yard pass from Derek Robertson (Hudson Fiene kick), 14:47. Raiders 31–28. Drive: 10 plays, 80 yards, 2:35.
- MONM – Gavin Nelson 51-yard pass from Derek Robertson (Hudson Fiene kick), 12:24. Hawks 35–31. Drive: 1 play, 51 yards, 0:08.
- MONM – Rodney Nelson 75-yard run (Hudson Fiene kick), 9:32. Hawks 42–31. Drive: 3 plays, 84 yards, 0:39.
- COLG – Danny Shaban 2-yard run (Jake Stearney–Brady Hutchison pass), 4:48. Hawks 42–39. Drive: 13 plays, 85 yards, 4:40.

Statistics	MONM	COLG
First downs	32	27
Total yards	678	541
Rushes–yards	28–187	40–176
Passing yards	491	365
Passing: Comp–Att–Int	34–45–4	21–37–0
Turnovers	4	1
Time of possession	27:03	32:57

Team	Category	Player	Statistics
Monmouth	Passing	Derek Robertson	34/45, 491 yards, 4 TD, 4 INT
Monmouth	Rushing	Rodney Nelson	22 carries, 169 yards, 2 TD
Monmouth	Receiving	Gavin Nelson	5 receptions, 176 yards, 3 TD
Colgate	Passing	Zach Osborne	11/14, 227 yards, 2 TD
Colgate	Rushing	Zach Osborne	10 carries, 59 yards
Colgate	Receiving	Treyvhon Saunders	13 receptions, 223 yards, 2 TD

=== at Fordham ===
No. 21 Monmouth Hawks (1-0) at Fordham Rams (0-1) – Game summary

Quarter	1	2	3	4	Total
No. 21 Hawks	21	13	0	15	49
Rams	14	7	7	0	28

at Coffey Field • New York City, NY

- Date: September 6
- Game time: 6:00 PM EDT
- Game weather: Rain, Temperature: 74 °F (23 °C), Wind: at 6 miles per hour (9.7 km/h) SW
- Game attendance: 0
- Referee: Todd Bowman
- TV announcers (ESPN+): Andrew Bogusch (play-by-play) and Andrew Posadas (analyst)

Game information

First quarter

- FOR – Gunnar Smith 4-yard run (Bennett Henderson kick), 9:50. Rams 7–0. Drive: 4 plays, 25 yards, 1:14.
- MONM – Josh Derry 29-yard pass from Derek Robertson (Hudson Fiene kick), Tied 7–7. Drive: 7 plays, 90 yards (TOP/Score Time unavailable).
- FOR – Jabril Carter 12-yard pass from Gunnar Smith (Bennett Henderson kick), 4:09. Rams 14–7. Drive: 6 plays, 78 yards (TOP unavailable).
- MONM – Josh Derry 67-yard pass from Derek Robertson (Hudson Fiene kick), 3:51. Tied 14–14. Drive: 1 play, 67 yards, 0:11.
- MONM – TJ Speight 22-yard pass from Derek Robertson (Hudson Fiene kick), 0:00. Hawks 21–14. Drive: 9 plays, 70 yards, 3:26.

Second quarter

- FOR – Jack Betten 70-yard pass from Gunnar Smith (Bennett Henderson kick), 13:19. Tied 21–21. Drive: 5 plays, 80 yards, 1:36.
- MONM – TJ Speight 2-yard pass from Derek Robertson (Hudson Fiene kick), 9:41. Hawks 28–21. Drive: 8 plays, 17 yards, 3:19.
- MONM – Josh Derry 7-yard pass from Derek Robertson (Hudson Fiene kick BLOCKED), 1:15. Hawks 34–21. Drive: 9 plays, 55 yards, 3:13.

Third quarter

- FOR – Troy Worrell 6-yard pass from Gunnar Smith (Bennett Henderson kick), 11:50. Hawks 34–28. Drive: 8 plays, 75 yards, 3:10.

Fourth quarter

- MONM – Derek Robertson 1-yard run (Josh Derry–Derek Henderson pass), 14:52. Hawks 42–28. Drive: 13 plays, 64 yards, 4:48.
- MONM – Josh Derry 3-yard pass from Derek Robertson (Hudson Fiene kick), 1:56. Hawks 49–28. Drive: 10 plays, 49 yards, 4:53.

Statistics	MONM	FOR
First downs	25	23
Total yards	469	421
Rushes–yards	37–127	25–39
Passing yards	342	382
Passing: Comp–Att–Int	29–43–1	27–49–1
Turnovers	1	2
Time of possession	28:47	31:13

Team	Category	Player	Statistics
Monmouth	Passing	Derek Robertson	29/43, 342 yards, 6 TD, INT
Monmouth	Rushing	Rodney Nelson	25 carries, 112 yards
Monmouth	Receiving	Josh Derry	10 receptions, 144 yards, 4 TD
Fordham	Passing	Gunnar Smith	27/49, 382 yards, 3 TD, INT
Fordham	Rushing	Jamell James	9 carries, 31 yards
Fordham	Receiving	Jack Freeburg	3 receptions, 89 yards

=== at Charlotte (FBS) ===
No. 20 Monmouth Hawks (2-0) vs. Charlotte 49ers (FBS) (0-2) – Game summary

Quarter	1	2	3	4	Total
No. 20 Hawks	7	7	7	14	35
49ers (FBS)	0	7	21	14	42

at Jerry Richardson Stadium • Charlotte, NC

- Date: September 13
- Game time: 6:00 PM EDT
- Game weather: Sunny • Temperature: 79 °F (26 °C) • Wind: NE at 8 miles per hour (13 km/h)
- Game attendance: 15,681
- Referee: Steven Anderson
- TV announcers (ESPN+): Justin Kutcher (play-by-play) and Reggie Walker (analyst)

Game information

First quarter

- (3:17) MONM – Elijah Jennings 1-yard run, Hudson Fiene kick (Drive: 7 plays, 40 yards, 3:03; Monmouth 7–0)

Second quarter

- (1:52) CLT – E. Jai Mason 7-yard pass from Conner Harrell, Liam Boyd kick (Drive: 7 plays, 77 yards, 3:01; Tied 7–7)
- (0:51) MONM – Maxwell James 15-yard pass from Derek Robertson, Hudson Fiene kick (Drive: 6 plays, 75 yards, 1:01; Monmouth 14–7)

Third quarter

- (12:18) CLT – Conner Harrell 8-yard run, Liam Boyd kick (Drive: 6 plays, 76 yards, 2:36; Tied 14–14)
- (10:02) MONM – Josh Derry 29-yard pass from Derek Robertson, Hudson Fiene kick (Drive: 5 plays, 75 yards, 2:16; Monmouth 21–14)
- (7:59) CLT – Rod Gainey Jr. 1-yard run, Liam Boyd kick (Drive: 5 plays, 65 yards, 2:03; Tied 21–21)
- (1:15) CLT – Joey Bearns III 4-yard pass from Conner Harrell, Liam Boyd kick (Drive: 9 plays, 55 yards, 3:34; Charlotte 28–21)

Fourth quarter

- (14:55) MONM – Rodney Nelson 8-yard pass from Derek Robertson, Hudson Fiene kick (Drive: 4 plays, 75 yards, 1:20; Tied 28–28)
- (8:37) CLT – E. Jai Mason 24-yard pass from Conner Harrell, Liam Boyd kick (Drive: 11 plays, 84 yards, 6:07; Charlotte 35–28)
- (3:19) MONM – Josh Derry 4-yard pass from Derek Robertson, Hudson Fiene kick (Drive: 11 plays, 75 yards, 5:18; Tied 35–35)
- (1:30) CLT – Conner Harrell 2-yard run, Liam Boyd kick (Drive: 6 plays, 65 yards, 1:49; Charlotte 42–35)

Statistics	MONM	CLT
First downs	28	29
Plays–yards	72–458	72–563
Rushes–yards	23–48	42–181
Passing yards	410	382
Passing: comp–att–int	36–49–0	26–30–1
Turnovers	0	3
Time of possession	26:52	33:08

Team	Category	Player	Statistics
Monmouth	Passing	Derek Robertson	36/49, 410 yards, 4 TD
Monmouth	Rushing	Rodney Nelson	11 carries, 45 yards
Monmouth	Receiving	Josh Derry	7 receptions, 110 yards, 2 TD
Charlotte	Passing	Conner Harrell	26/30, 382 yards, 3 TD, INT
Charlotte	Rushing	Rod Gainey Jr.	15 carries, 74 yards, TD
Charlotte	Receiving	E. Jai Mason	10 receptions, 228 yards, 2 TD

=== No. 11 Villanova ===
No. 11 Villanova Wildcats (1–1) at No. 21 Monmouth Hawks (2–1) – Game summary

Quarter	1	2	3	4	Total
No. 11 Wildcats	7	7	13	6	33
No. 21 Hawks	17	14	14	6	51

at Kessler Field • West Long Branch, NJ

- Date: September 20
- Game time: 1:00 PM EDT
- Game weather: Sunny • Temperature: 70 °F (21 °C) • Wind: SW at 13 miles per hour (21 km/h)
- Game attendance: 4,200
- Referee: Jeff Pumphrey
- TV announcers (FloFootball): Eddy Occhipinti (play-by-play), Emory Hunt (analyst) and Brandon London (sideline)

Game information

First quarter

- (14:14) MONM – Josh Derry 75-yard pass from Derek Robertson, Hudson Fiene kick (Drive: 2 plays, 75 yards, 0:46; Monmouth 7–0)
- (11:00) VILL – Brandon Binkowski 10-yard pass from Pat McQuaide, Jack Barnum kick (Drive: 6 plays, 67 yards, 3:08; 7-7)
- (8:14) MONM – Hudson Diene 28-yard field goal (Drive: 8 plays, 65 yards, 2:46; Monmouth 10-7)
- (3:00) MONM – Makhi Green 72-yard pass from Derek Robertson, Hudson Fiene kick (Drive: 3 plays, 97 yards, 1:29; Monmouth 17-7)

Second quarter

- (14:28) MONM – Tra Neal 40-yard pass from Derek Robertson, Hudson Fiene kick (Drive: 6 plays, 74 yards, 1:54; Monmouth 24-7)
- (1:57) MONM – Elijah Jennings 2-yard run, Hudson Fiene kick (Drive: 8 plays, 61 yards, 2:52; Monmouth 31–7)
- (0:49) VILL – David Avit 2-yard run, Jack Barnum kick (Drive: 9 plays, 65 yards, 1:00; Monmouth 31-14)

Third quarter

- (13:04) VILL – David Avit 19-yard run, Jack Barnum kick (Drive: 4 plays, 72 yards, 1:50; Monmouth 31-21)
- (10:48) MONM – Rodney Nelson 10-yard run, Hudson Fiene kick (Drive: 7 plays, 59 yards, 2:10; Monmouth 38-21)
- (7:31) MONM – Josh Derry 16-yard pass from Derek Robertson, Hudson Fiene kick (Drive: 5 plays, 46 yards, 2:14; Monmouth 45-21)
- (3:09) VILL – David Avit 2-yard run, Two-point pass conversion failed (Drive: 9 plays, 75 yards, 4:22; Monmouth 45-27)

Fourth quarter

- (10:38) MONM – Rodney Nelson 4-yard run, Hudson Fiene PAT failed (Drive: 13 plays, 75 yards, 7:31; Monmouth 51-27)
- (2:15) VILL – Antonio Johnson 30-yard pass from Pat McQuaide, Two-point pass conversion failed (Drive: 6 plays, 87 yards, 1:39; Monmouth 51-33)

Statistics	VILL	MONM
First downs	27	34
Plays–yards	71–498	75–637
Rushes–yards	28–165	45–240
Passing yards	333	397
Passing: Comp–Att–Int	25-43-0	20-30-0
Turnovers	1	0
Time of possession	27:39	32:21

Team	Category	Player	Statistics
Villanova	Passing	Pat McQuaide	25/43, 333 yards, 2 TD
Villanova	Rushing	David Avit	18 carries, 135 yards, 3 TD
Villanova	Receiving	Luke Colella	9 receptions, 117 yards
Monmouth	Passing	Derek Robertson	20/30, 397 yards, 4 TD
Monmouth	Rushing	Rodney Nelson	33 carries, 186 yards, 2 TD
Monmouth	Receiving	Josh Derry	8 receptions, 177 yards, 2 TD

=== Delaware State ===
Delaware State Hornets (3-2) vs. No. 14 Monmouth Hawks (3-1) – Game summary

Quarter	1	2	3	4	Total
Hornets	7	14	14	3	38
No. 14 Hawks	14	14	14	7	49

at Kessler Field • West Long Branch, NJ

- Date: October 4
- Game time: 1:00 PM EDT
- Game weather: Sunny • Temperature: 76 °F (24 °C) • Wind: E at 6 miles per hour (9.7 km/h)
- Game attendance: 2,967
- Referee: Alex Perella
- TV announcers (FloFootball): Matt Harmon (play-by-play), Emory Hunt (analyst) and Brandon London (sideline)

Game information

First Quarter

- (11:55) MONM – Rodney Nelson 5-yard run, Hudson Fiene kick (Drive: 8 plays, 75 yards, 3:05; Monmouth 7-0)
- (6:51) MONM – TJ Speight 38-yard pass from Derek Robertson, Hudson Fiene kick (Drive: 8 plays, 73 yards, 3:05; Monmouth 14-0)
- (1:55) DSU – James Jones 10-yard run, Patrick Fisher-Butler kick (Drive: 11 plays, 76 yards, 4:48; Monmouth 14-7)

Second Quarter

- (11:35) DSU – James Jones 1-yard run, Patrick Fisher-Butler kick (Drive: 10 plays, 70 yards, 3:40; 14-14)
- (9:21) MONM – Gavin Nelson 23-yard pass from Derek Robertson, Hudson Fiene kick (Drive: 7 plays, 75 yards, 2:14; Monmouth 21-14)
- (7:49) DSU – James Jones 3-yard run, Patrick Fisher-Butler kick (Drive: 4 plays, 83 yards, 1:27; 21-21)
- (1:53) MONM – Tra Neal 9-yard pass from Derek Robertson, Hudson Fiene kick (Drive: 7 plays, 38 yards, 3:09; Monmouth 28-21)

Third Quarter

- (11:38) DSU – Kaiden Bennett 7-yard run, Patrick Fisher-Butler kick (Drive: 8 plays, 75 yards, 3:22; 28-28)
- (9:14) MONM – Rodney Nelson 4-yard run, Hudson Fiene kick (Drive: 6 plays, 71 yards, 2:15; Monmouth 35-28)
- (5:23) DSU – Marquis Gillis 8-yard run, Patrick Fisher-Butler kick (Drive: 9 plays, 73 yards, 3:44; 35-35)
- (4:09) MONM – Jack Neri 33-yard pass from Derek Robertson, Hudson Fiene kick (Drive: 3 plays, 75 yards, 1:14; Monmouth 42-35)

Fourth Quarter

- (13:11) DSU – Patrick Fisher-Butler 30-yard field goal (Drive: 12 plays, 69 yards, 5:51; Monmouth 42-38)
- (8:40) MONM – Tra Neal 25-yard pass from Derek Robertson, Hudson Fiene kick (Drive: 11 plays, 75 yards, 4:31; Monmouth 49-38)

Statistics	DSU	MONM
First downs	26	30
Total yards	393	636
Rushing yards	281	252
Passing yards	112	384
Passing: Comp–Att–Int	11-21-0	26-39-0
Time of possession	29:01	30:59

Team	Category	Player	Statistics
Delaware State	Passing	Kaiden Bennett	10/20, 94 yards
Delaware State	Rushing	Marquis Gillis	15 carries, 132 yards, TD
Delaware State	Receiving	Nathan Stewart	2 receptions, 27 yards
Monmouth	Passing	Derek Robertson	25/38, 351 yards, 4 TD
Monmouth	Rushing	Rodney Nelson	32 carries, 203 yards, 2 TD
Monmouth	Receiving	TJ Speight	7 receptions, 145 yards, TD

=== at Towson ===
No. 12 Monmouth Hawks (4-1) vs. Towson Tigers (3-3) – Game summary

Quarter	1	2	3	4	Total
No. 12 Hawks	7	14	7	14	42
Tigers	0	14	7	10	31

at Johnny Unitas Stadium • Towson, MD

- Date: October 11
- Game time: 2:00 PM EDT
- Game weather: Cloudy • Temperature: 57 °F (14 °C)
- Game attendance: 5,487
- Referee: Todd Bowman
- TV announcers (FloFootball): Spiro Morekas (play-by-play) and Gordy Combs (analyst)

Game information

First Quarter

- (8:16) MONM – Rodney Nelson 1-yard run, Hudson Fiene kick (Drive: 15 plays, 75 yards, 6:44; Monmouth 7-0)

Second Quarter

- (14:56) MONM – Maxwell James 4-yard pass from Derek Robertson, Hudson Fiene kick (Drive: 12 plays, 65 yards, 5:24; Monmouth 14-0)
- (11:33) TOW – CJ Schaeffer 1-yard pass from Winston Watkins, Caden Williams kick (Drive: 9 plays, 75 yards, 3:23; Monmouth 14-7)
- (5:56) MONM – Elijah Jennings 1-yard run, Hudson Fiene kick (Drive: 4 plays, 37 yards, 1:31; Monmouth 21-7)
- (0:30) TOW – John Dunmore 4-yard pass from Andrew Indorf, Caden Williams kick (Drive: 14 plays, 68 yards, 5:19; Monmouth 21-14)

Third Quarter

- (12:52) TOW – Lukkas Londono 6-yard pass from Andrew Indorf, Caden Williams kick (Drive: 4 plays, 75 yards, 2:08; 21-21)
- (3:37) MONM – Elijah Jennings 1-yard run, Hudson Fiene kick (Drive: 10 plays, 80 yards, 4:19; Monmouth 28-21)

Fourth Quarter

- (14:57) TOW – Winston Watkins 8-yard run, Caden Williams kick (Drive: 10 plays, 75 yards, 3:40; 28-28)
- (9:15) MONM – Jack Neri 10-yard pass from Derek Robertson, Hudson Fiene kick (Drive: 12 plays, 75 yards, 5:42; Monmouth 35-28)
- (4:53) TOW – Caden Williams 30-yard field goal (Drive: 9 plays, 63 yards, 4:22; Monmouth 35-31)
- (2:06) MONM – Elijah Jennings 3-yard run, Hudson Fiene kick (Drive: 7 plays, 73 yards, 2:42; Monmouth 42-31)

Statistics	MONM	TOW
First downs	29	23
Total yards	448	418
Rushing yards	204	125
Passing yards	244	293
Passing: Comp–Att–Int	26–31–0	22–29–0
Time of possession	31:25	28:35

Team	Category	Player	Statistics
Monmouth	Passing	Derek Robertson	26/31, 244 yards, 2 TD
Monmouth	Rushing	Rodney Nelson	27 carries, 152 yards, TD
Monmouth	Receiving	Josh Derry	6 receptions, 67 yards
Towson	Passing	Andrew Indorf	21/28, 292 yards, 2 TD
Towson	Rushing	Al Wooten II	15 carries, 41 yards
Towson	Receiving	Jaceon Doss	7 receptions, 139 yards

=== Stony Brook ===
Stony Brook Seawolves (3-3) vs. No. 11 Monmouth Hawks (5-1) – Game summary

Quarter	1	2	3	4	Total
Seawolves	7	7	7	0	21
No. 11 Hawks	14	7	7	21	49

at Kessler Field • West Long Branch, NJ

- Date: October 18
- Game time: 1:00 PM EDT
- Game weather: Sunny • Temperature: 62 °F (17 °C) • Wind: SE at 5 miles per hour (8.0 km/h)
- Game attendance: 3,198
- Referee: Henry Wimberg
- TV announcers (FloFootball): Eddy Occhipinti (play-by-play), Emory Hunt (analyst) and Brandon London (sideline)

Game information

First Quarter

- (12:21) MONM – Gavin Nelson 28-yard pass from Derek Robertson, Hudson Fiene kick (Drive: 8 plays, 75 yards, 2:39; Monmouth 7-0)
- (7:57) MONM – Josh Derry 19-yard pass from Derek Robertson, Hudson Fiene kick (Drive: 5 plays, 41 yards, 2:21; Monmouth 14-0)
- (7:44) STBK – Jayce Freeman 95-yard kickoff return, Michael Mannino kick (Monmouth 14-7)

Second Quarter

- (13:06) MONM – Tra Neal 15-yard pass from Derek Robertson, Hudson Fiene kick (Drive: 10 plays, 80 yards, 4:38; Monmouth 21-7)
- (0:15) STBK – Roland Dempster 1-yard run, Michael Mannino kick (Drive: 11 plays, 95 yards, 2:11; Monmouth 21-14)

Third Quarter

- (6:16) MONM – Ryan Russo 50-yard interception return, Hudson Fiene kick (Monmouth 28-14)
- (0:29) STBK – Chris Zellous 8-yard pass from MarQeese Dietz, Michael Mannino kick (Drive: 10 plays, 77 yards, 3:12; Monmouth 28-21)

Fourth Quarter

- (13:03) MONM – Tra Neal 13-yard pass from Frankie Weaver, Hudson Fiene kick (Drive: 7 plays, 75 yards, 2:26; Monmouth 35-21)
- (11:59) MONM – Rodney Nelson 1-yard run, Hudson Fiene kick (Drive: 2 plays, 2 yards, 0:25; Monmouth 42-21)
- (4:52) MONM – Rodney Nelson 73-yard run, Hudson Fiene kick (Drive: 3 plays, 75 yards, 1:36; Monmouth 49-21)

Statistics	STBK	MONM
First downs	26	20
Total yards	423	415
Rushing yards	210	150
Passing yards	213	265
Passing: Comp–Att–Int	25–42–2	23–35–0
Time of possession	32:49	27:11

Team	Category	Player	Statistics
Stony Brook	Passing	Chris Zellous	13/22, 103 yards, 2 INT
Stony Brook	Rushing	Chris Zellous	17 carries, 107 yards
Stony Brook	Receiving	Jayce Freeman	5 receptions, 63 yards
Monmouth	Passing	Derek Robertson	19/29, 204 yards, 3 TD
Monmouth	Rushing	Rodney Nelson	20 carries, 141 yards, 2 TD
Monmouth	Receiving	Josh Derry	7 receptions, 109 yards, TD

=== at Hampton ===
No. 10 Monmouth Hawks (6-1) vs. Hampton Pirates (2-6) – Game summary

Quarter	1	2	3	4	Total
No. 10 Hawks	7	7	0	14	28
Pirates	3	0	7	0	10

at Armstrong Stadium • Hampton, VA

- Date: October 25
- Game time: 2:00 PM EDT
- Game weather: Sunny • Temperature: 60 °F (16 °C)
- Game attendance: 8,693
- Referee: Tom Zetts
- TV announcers (FloFootball): Nathan Epstein (play-by-play), Terence Green (analyst) and Tamara Brown (sideline)

Game information

First Quarter

- (7:30) HAMP – Brett Starling 19-yard field goal (Drive: 10 plays, 59 yards, 4:56; Hampton 3-0)
- (5:16) MONM – Rodney Nelson 5-yard run, Hudson Fiene kick (Drive: 6 plays, 75 yards, 2:14; Monmouth 7-3)

Second Quarter

- (10:44) MONM – Rodney Nelson 3-yard run, Hudson Fiene kick (Drive: 13 plays, 87 yards, 4:16; Monmouth 14-3)

Third Quarter

- (12:44) HAMP – Gracen Goldsmith 1-yard run, Brett Starling kick (Drive: 6 plays, 91 yards, 2:12; Monmouth 14-10)

Fourth Quarter

- (9:36) MONM – Rodney Nelson 1-yard run, Hudson Fiene kick (Drive: 12 plays, 80 yards, 5:17; Monmouth 21-10)
- (2:03) MONM – Rodney Nelson 6-yard run, Hudson Fiene kick (Drive: 10 plays, 54 yards, 5:30; Monmouth 28-10)

Statistics	MONM	HAMP
First downs	26	20
Total yards	420	381
Rushing yards	298	119
Passing yards	122	262
Passing: Comp–Att–Int	14–25–1	22–34–1
Time of possession	30:01	29:59

Team	Category	Player	Statistics
Monmouth	Passing	Frankie Weaver	14/25, 122 yards, INT
Monmouth	Rushing	Rodney Nelson	33 carries, 233 yards, 4 TD
Monmouth	Receiving	Maxwell James	2 receptions, 30 yards
Hampton	Passing	Braden Davis	21/33, 242 yards, INT
Hampton	Rushing	Donovan Shepard	9 carries, 57 yards
Hampton	Receiving	Tae'Shaun Johnson	7 receptions, 104 yards

=== at Bryant ===
No. 10 Monmouth Hawks (7-1) vs. Bryant Bulldogs (2-6) – Game summary

Quarter	1	2	3	4	Total
No. 10 Hawks	7	14	7	7	35
Bulldogs	0	7	0	0	7

at Beirne Stadium • Smithfield, RI

- Date: November 1
- Game time: 1:00 PM EDT
- Game weather: Sunny • Wind: E at 12 miles per hour (19 km/h)
- Game attendance: 2,500
- Referee: Alex Parella
- TV: FloFootball

Game information

First Quarter

- (8:50) MONM – Rodney Nelson 69-yard run, Hudson Fiene kick (Drive: 2 plays, 73 yards, 0:46; Monmouth 7-0)

Second Quarter

- (14:57) BRY – Koby Keenan 9-yard pass from Jaden Keefner, Nicholas Stoyanovich kick (Drive: 7 plays, 38 yards, 3:12; 7-7)
- (4:36) MONM – Rodney Nelson 3-yard run, Hudson Fiene kick (Drive: 7 plays, 64 yards, 2:26; Monmouth 14-7)
- (0:21) MONM – Tra Neal 41-yard pass from Frankie Weaver, Hudson Fiene kick (Drive: 4 plays, 70 yards, 0:46; Monmouth 21-7)

Third Quarter

- (4:17) MONM – Gavin Nelson 8-yard pass from Frankie Weaver, Hudson Fiene kick (Drive: 13 plays, 70 yards, 7:16; Monmouth 28-7)

Fourth Quarter

- (1:05) MONM – Elijah Jennings 6-yard run, Hudson Fiene kick (Drive: 13 plays, 80 yards, 8:44; Monmouth 35-7)

Statistics	MONM	BRY
First downs	22	14
Total yards	481	222
Rushing yards	263	59
Passing yards	218	163
Passing: Comp–Att–Int	14–19–2	15–34–0
Time of possession	34:36	25:24

Team	Category	Player	Statistics
Monmouth	Passing	Frankie Weaver	14/19, 218 yards, 2 TD, 2 INT
Monmouth	Rushing	Rodney Nelson	34 carries, 244 yards, 2 TD
Monmouth	Receiving	Josh Derry	4 receptions, 78 yards
Bryant	Passing	Jaden Keefner	15/34, 163 yards, TD
Bryant	Rushing	Elijah Elliott	16 carries, 45 yards
Bryant	Receiving	Zyheem Collick	3 receptions, 69 yards

=== New Hampshire ===
New Hampshire Wildcats (5–4) at No. 7 Monmouth Hawks (8–1) – Game summary

Quarter	1	2	3	4	Total
Wildcats	0	13	14	7	34
No. 7 Hawks	7	6	0	0	13

at Kessler Field • West Long Branch, NJ

- Date: November 8
- Game time: 12:00 PM EST
- Game weather: Sunny • Temperature: 62 °F (17 °C) • Wind: SE at 10 miles per hour (16 km/h)
- Game attendance: 3,127
- Referee: Todd Boyd
- TV announcers (FloFootball): Matt Harmon (play-by-play), Emory Hunt (analyst) and Jackson Heil (sideline)

Game information

First quarter

- (3:24) MONM – Jack Neri 10-yard pass from Frankie Weaver, Hudson Fiene kick (Drive: 3 plays, 9 yards, 1:14; Monmouth 7-0)

Second quarter

- (11:30) UNH – Matt Vezza 13-yard run, Nick Reed kick (Drive: 5 plays, 62 yards, 2:42; 7-7)
- (2:46) UNH – Nick Reed 31-yard field goal (Drive: 9 plays, 40 yards, 5:52; New Hampshire 10-7)
- (0:44) UNH – Nick Reed 53-yard field goal (Drive: 6 plays, 24 yards, 5:52; New Hampshire 13-7)
- (0:08) MONM – Josh Derry 19-yard pass from Frankie Weaver, two-point run conversion failed (Drive: 5 plays, 75 yards, 0:36; 13-13)

Third quarter

- (8:37) UNH – Myles Thomason 22-yard run, Nick Reed kick (Drive: 10 plays, 75 yards, 6:23; New Hampshire 20-13)
- (7:10) UNH – Denzell Gibson 27-yard pass from Matt Vezza, Nick Reed kick (Drive: 3 plays, 37 yards, 0:56; New Hampshire 27-13)

Fourth quarter

- (4:33) UNH – Ryan Blagg 12-yard pass from Matt Vezza, Nick Reed kick (Drive: 9 plays, 68 yards, 5:24; New Hampshire 34-13)

Statistics	UNH	MONM
First downs	22	17
Plays–yards	69–383	60–304
Rushes–yards	43–197	30–71
Passing yards	186	233
Passing: Comp–Att–Int	17-26-0	20-30-0
Turnovers	1	2
Time of possession	37:28	22:32

Team	Category	Player	Statistics
New Hampshire	Passing	Matt Vezza	16/25, 173 yards, 2 TD
New Hampshire	Rushing	Myles Thomason	21 carries, 95 yards, TD
New Hampshire	Receiving	Chase Wilson	2 receptions, 67 yards
Monmouth	Passing	Frankie Weaver	20/30. 233 yards, 2 TD
Monmouth	Rushing	Rodney Nelson	19 carries, 88 yards
Monmouth	Receiving	TJ Speight	6 receptions, 89 yards

=== at North Carolina A&T ===
No. 12 Monmouth Hawks (8-2) vs. North Carolina A&T Aggies (2-7) – Game summary

Quarter	1	2	3	4	Total
No. 12 Hawks	21	21	21	0	63
Aggies	3	10	3	3	19

at Truist Stadium • Greensboro, NC

- Date: November 15
- Game time: 12:00 PM EST
- Game weather: Sunny • Temperature: 67 °F (19 °C) • Wind: SW at 9 miles per hour (14 km/h)
- Referee: Anthony Florio

Game information

First Quarter

- (10:54) MONM – Rodney Nelson 6-yard run, Hudson Fiene kick (Drive: 10 plays, 53 yards, 4:01; Monmouth 7-0)
- (9:29) MONM – Josh Derry 11-yard pass from Frankie Weaver, Hudson Fiene kick (Drive: 2 plays, 40 yards, 0:45; Monmouth 14-0)
- (4:46) NCAT – Andrew Brown 31-yard field goal (Drive: 10 plays, 68 yards, 4:34; Monmouth 14-3)
- (3:48) MONM – TJ Speight 62-yard pass from Frankie Weaver, Hudson Fiene kick (Drive: 3 plays, 72 yards, 0:58; Monmouth 21-3)

Second Quarter

- (12:21) NCAT – Andrew Brown 55-yard field goal (Drive: 8 plays, 15 yards, 2:29; Monmouth 21-6)
- (10:49) MONM – Jack Neri 26-yard pass from Frankie Weaver, Hudson Fiene kick (Drive: 6 plays, 51 yards, 1:26; Monmouth 28-6)
- (5:59) NCAT – Kevin White 3-yard run, Andrew Brown kick (Drive: 8 plays, 74 yards, 4:39; Monmouth 28-13)
- (2:33) MONM – Rodney Nelson 2-yard run, Hudson Fiene kick (Drive: 9 plays, 52 yards, 3:17; Monmouth 35-13)
- (1:06) MONM – Maxwell James 71-yard pass from Frankie Weaver, Hudson Fiene kick (Drive: 4 plays, 95 yards, 0:45; Monmouth 42-13)

Third Quarter

- (10:18) MONM – TJ Speight 53-yard pass from Frankie Weaver, Hudson Fiene kick (Drive: 4 plays, 83 yards, 1:54; Monmouth 49-13)
- (4:50) MONM – Josh Derry 29-yard pass from Frankie Weaver, Hudson Fiene kick (Drive: 9 plays, 86 yards, 3:03; Monmouth 56-13)
- (1:47) NCAT – Andrew Brown 53-yard field goal (Drive: 8 plays, 39 yards, 3:03; Monmouth 56-16)
- (0:55) MONM – Rodney Nelson 26-yard run, Hudson Fiene kick (Drive: 2 plays, 58 yards, 0:46; Monmouth 63-16)

Fourth Quarter

- (10:57) NCAT – Andrew Brown 53-yard field goal (Drive: 9 plays, 31 yards, 4:51; Monmouth 63-19)

Statistics	MONM	NCAT
First downs	28	17
Total yards	696	323
Rushing yards	268	145
Passing yards	428	178
Passing: Comp–Att–Int	19-28-0	14-27-0
Time of possession	27:08	32:52

Team	Category	Player	Statistics
Monmouth	Passing	Frankie Weaver	19/27, 428 yards, 6 TD
Monmouth	Rushing	Rodney Nelson	23 carries, 163 yards, 3 TD
Monmouth	Receiving	TJ Speight	5 receptions, 162 yards, 2 TD
North Carolina A&T	Passing	Kevin White	12/24, 183 yards
North Carolina A&T	Rushing	Wesley Graves	12 carries, 58 yards
North Carolina A&T	Receiving	Jayvonne Dillard	6 receptions, 103 yards

=== Albany ===
Albany Great Danes (1-10) vs. No. 12 Monmouth Hawks (9-2) – Game summary

Quarter	1	2	3	4	Total
Great Danes	-	-	-	-	0
No. 12 Hawks	-	-	-	-	0

at Kessler Field • West Long Branch, NJ

- Date: November 22
- Game time: 12:00 PM EST

Statistics	ALB	MONM
First downs		
Total yards		
Rushing yards		
Passing yards		
Passing: Comp–Att–Int		
Time of possession		

Team	Category	Player	Statistics
Albany	Passing		
Albany	Rushing		
Albany	Receiving		
Monmouth	Passing		
Monmouth	Rushing		
Monmouth	Receiving		

== Ranking movements ==
Ranking movements Legend: ██ Increase in ranking ██ Decrease in ranking т = Tied with team above or below
	Week														
Poll	Pre	1	2	3	4	5	6	7	8	9	10	11	12	13	Final
STATS FCS	22	21	20	21	16	14	12	11	10	10	7	12	12	21	22
Coaches	21	18	18	18	14	12	11	10	9	9	6	12	11т	16	20
