= 2025 Hampton Pirates football team =

American college football season

2025 Hampton Pirates football
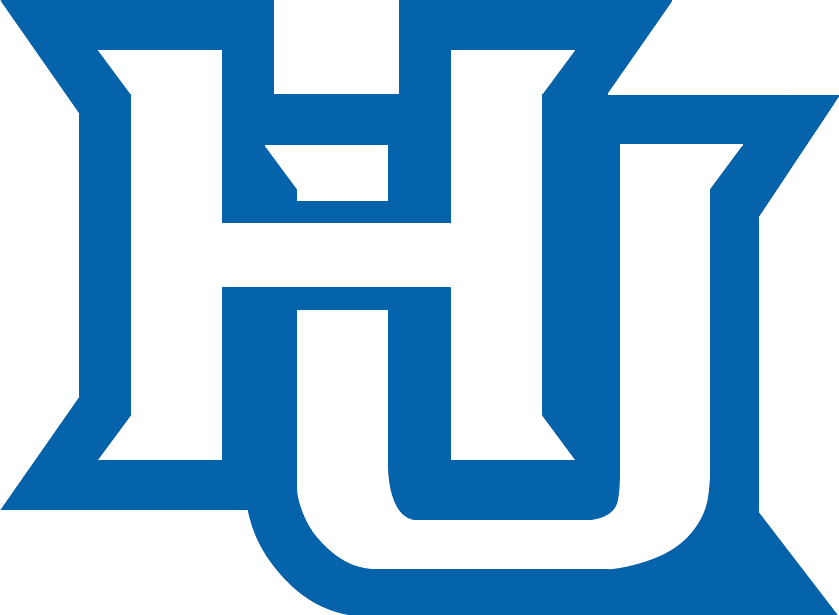
- Conference: CAA Football
- Record: 2–10 (0–8 CAA)
- Head coach: Trenton Boykin (2nd season)
- Co-offensive coordinators: Bobby Blizzard (2nd season); Ollie Taylor (1st season)
- Defensive coordinator: Todd McComb (6th season)
- Home stadium: Armstrong Stadium

2025 Coastal Athletic Association Football Conference standings
	Conf.			Overall
Team	W		L	W		L
No. 11 Rhode Island $^	8	–	0	11	–	3
No. 4т Villanova ^	7	–	1	12	–	3
No. 23 New Hampshire ^	6	–	2	8	–	5
No. 22 Monmouth	6	–	2	9	–	3
William & Mary	6	–	2	7	–	5
Maine	5	–	3	6	–	6
Elon	4	–	4	6	–	6
Stony Brook	4	–	4	6	–	6
Towson	4	–	4	6	–	6
North Carolina A&T	2	–	6	2	–	10
Campbell	2	–	6	2	–	10
Bryant	1	–	7	3	–	9
Albany	1	–	7	2	–	10
Hampton	0	–	8	2	–	10
$ – Conference champion; ^ – FCS playoff participant; Rankings from STATS Poll

The 2025 Hampton Pirates football team represented Hampton University as a member of the Coastal Athletic Association Football Conference (CAA) during the 2025 NCAA Division I FCS football season. The Pirates were led by second-year head coach Trenton Boykin, and played their home games at Armstrong Stadium in Hampton, Virginia.

== Schedule ==
Date	Time	Opponent	Site	TV	Result	Attendance
August 30	3:00 p.m.	at No. 17 Jackson State*	Mississippi Veterans Memorial Stadium; Jackson, MS	HBCU Go	L 14–28	13,576
September 6	6:00 p.m.	Elizabeth City State*	Armstrong Stadium; Hampton, VA	FloSports	W 27–20	5,131
September 13	7:00 p.m.	at North Carolina A&T	Truist Stadium; Greensboro, NC	FloSports	L 30–33 ^{2OT}	15,806
September 20	4:00 p.m.	vs. Howard*	Audi Field; Washington, D.C. (The Real HU / Truth and Service Classic)	HBCU Go	L 7–34	18,672
September 27	2:00 p.m.	at Elon	Rhodes Stadium; Elon, NC	FloSports	L 20–41	11,158
October 4	4:00 p.m.	Norfolk State*	Armstrong Stadium; Hampton, VA (Battle of the Bay)	FloSports	W 41–34	9,710
October 11	2:00 p.m.	Campbell	Armstrong Stadium; Hampton, VA	FloSports	L 21–38	3,358
October 18	1:00 p.m.	at No. 15 Villanova	Villanova Stadium; Villanova, PA	FloSports	L 14–56	2,111
October 25	2:00 p.m.	No. 10 Monmouth^{†}	Armstrong Stadium; Hampton, VA	FloSports	L 10–28	8,693
November 8	1:00 p.m.	Maine	Armstrong Stadium; Hampton, VA	FloSports	L 7–35	2,179
November 15	1:00 p.m.	William & Mary	Armstrong Stadium; Hampton, VA	FloSports	L 14–55	2,401
November 22	1:00 p.m.	at No. 10 Rhode Island	Meade Stadium; Kingston, RI	FloSports	L 10–38	4,461
*Non-conference game; ^{†}Homecoming; Rankings from STATS Poll released prior to the game; All times are in Eastern time

== Game summaries ==
=== at No. 17 Jackson State ===
Hampton Pirates (0-0) at No. 17 Jackson State Tigers (0-0) – Game summary

Quarter	1	2	3	4	Total
Pirates	7	0	0	7	14
No. 17 Tigers	7	7	0	14	28

at Mississippi Veterans Memorial Stadium • Jackson, MS

- Date: August 30
- Game time: 3:00 PM EDT
- Game weather: Sunny
- Game attendance: 13,576
- Referee: Preston Clipper
- TV announcers (HBCU Go): James Hadnot (play-by-play), Jon Kelley (analyst) and Lawrencia Moten (sideline)

Game information

First Quarter

- (12:23) HAMP – Ja'Quan Snipes 3-yard run, Brett Starling kick (Drive: 5 plays, 75 yards, 2:37; Hampton 7–0)
- (7:48) JKST – Emari Matthews 2-yard run, Gerardo Baeza kick (Drive: 3 plays, 19 yards, 1:38; Tied 7–7)

Second Quarter

- (14:35) JKST – Donerio Davenport 6-yard run, Gerardo Baeza kick (Drive: 7 plays, 67 yards, 2:44; Jackson State 14–7)

Third Quarter

No scoring plays

Fourth Quarter

- (10:44) HAMP – MarShawn Ferguson Jr. 30-yard pass from Isaiah Freeman, Brett Starling kick (Drive: 3 plays, 55 yards, 0:50; Tied 14–14)
- (5:32) JKST – Ahmad Miller 2-yard run, Gerardo Baeza kick (Drive: 12 plays, 82 yards, 5:03; Jackson State 21–14)
- (4:00) JKST – Ahmad Miller 76-yard run, Gerardo Baeza kick (Drive: 1 play, 76 yards, 0:13; Jackson State 28–14)

Statistics	HAMP	JKST
First downs	20	19
Total yards	376	426
Rushing yards	175	283
Passing yards	201	143
Passing: Comp–Att–Int	21–29–1	15–30–0
Time of possession	33:33	26:27

Team	Category	Player	Statistics
Hampton	Passing	Isaiah Freeman	10/17, 117 yards, TD, INT
Hampton	Rushing	Isaiah Freeman	13 carries, 94 yards
Hampton	Receiving	MarShawn Ferguson Jr.	5 receptions, 59 yards, TD
Jackson State	Passing	JaCobian Morgan	15/30, 143 yards
Jackson State	Rushing	Ahmad Miller	10 carries, 172 yards, 2 TD
Jackson State	Receiving	Joanes Fortilien	5 receptions, 43 yards

=== Elizabeth City State (DII) ===
Elizabeth City State Vikings (DII) (0-1) at Hampton Pirates (0-1) – Game summary

Quarter	1	2	3	4	Total
Vikings (DII)	7	13	0	0	20
Pirates	10	0	7	10	27

at Armstrong Stadium • Hampton, VA

- Date: September 6
- Game time: 6:00 PM EDT
- Game weather: Sunny • Temperature: 91 °F (33 °C) • Wind: E at 10 miles per hour (16 km/h)
- Game attendance: 5,131
- Referee: Alexander Randolph
- TV announcers (FloSports): Nathan Epstein (play-by-play), Kylee Quinn (analyst) and Tamara Brown (sideline)

Game information

First Quarter

- (9:41) HAMP – Brett Starling 36-yard field goal (Drive: 12 plays, 56 yards, 5:19; Hampton 3–0)
- (4:09) ELIZ – Christopher Perkins 15-yard run, Benjamin Turner kick (Drive: 12 plays, 81 yards, 5:27; Elizabeth City State 7–3)
- (0:50) HAMP – Jah'Kei Chavis 3-yard run, Brett Starling kick (Drive: 9 plays, 75 yards, 3:19; Hampton 10–7)

Second Quarter

- (1:59) ELIZ – Joe Griffin 25-yard pass from Christopher Perkins (Drive: 11 plays, 76 yards, 6:13; Elizabeth City State 13–10)
- (0:02) ELIZ – Christopher Perkins 22-yard run, Benjamin Turner kick (Drive: 5 plays, 41 yards, 1:42; Elizabeth City State 20–10)

Third Quarter

- (1:35) HAMP – Ja'Quan Snipes 5-yard run, Brett Starling kick (Drive: 15 plays, 80 yards, 6:55; Elizabeth City State 20–17)

Fourth Quarter

- (5:21) HAMP – Brett Starling 30-yard field goal (Drive: 8 plays, 46 yards, 3:19; Tied 20–20)
- (0:39) HAMP – Ja'Quan Snipes 47-yard run, Brett Starling kick (Drive: 3 plays, 52 yards, 1:03; Hampton 27–20)

Statistics	ELIZ	HAMP
First downs	25	20
Total yards	353	391
Rushing yards	165	332
Passing yards	188	59
Passing: Comp–Att–Int	19–30–0	11–20–0
Time of possession	31:16	28:44

Team	Category	Player	Statistics
Elizabeth City State	Passing	Christopher Perkins	19/30, 188 yards, TD
Elizabeth City State	Rushing	Traquan Johnson	17 carries, 80 yards
Elizabeth City State	Receiving	Joe Griffin	4 receptions, 51 yards, TD
Hampton	Passing	Isaiah Freeman	9/16, 51 yards
Hampton	Rushing	Ja'Quan Snipes	18 carries, 174 yards, 2 TD
Hampton	Receiving	Maxwell Moss	3 receptions, 26 yards

=== at North Carolina A&T ===
Hampton Pirates (1-1) at North Carolina A&T Aggies (0-2) – Game summary

Quarter	1	2	3	4	Total
Pirates	-	-	-	-	0
Aggies	-	-	-	-	0

at Truist Stadium • Greensboro, NC

- Date: September 13
- Game time: 7:00 PM EDT
- TV: FloSports

Statistics	HAMP	NCAT
First downs		
Total yards		
Rushing yards		
Passing yards		
Passing: Comp–Att–Int		
Time of possession		

Team	Category	Player	Statistics
Hampton	Passing		
Hampton	Rushing		
Hampton	Receiving		
North Carolina A&T	Passing		
North Carolina A&T	Rushing		
North Carolina A&T	Receiving		

=== vs. Howard (The Real HU) ===
Howard Bison (2-1) vs. Hampton Pirates (1-2) – Game summary

Quarter	1	2	3	4	Total
Bison	7	13	14	0	34
Pirates	0	0	0	7	7

at Audi Field • Washington, DC

- Date: September 20
- Game time: 4:00 p.m. EDT
- Game weather: Cloudy • Temperature: 77 °F (25 °C) • Wind: E at 8 miles per hour (13 km/h)
- Game attendance: 18,672
- Referee: Jason Soistman
- TV announcers (HBCU Go): James Hadnot (play-by-play), Steve Wyche (analyst) and Nia Symone (sideline)

Game information

First Quarter

- (13:23) HOW – Travus Kerney 38-yard run, Matt Conord kick (Drive: 3 plays, 65 yards, 1:12; Howard 7–0)

Second Quarter

- (14:50) HOW – KD Mosley 17-yard pass from Kaden Cobb, Matt Conord kick (Drive: 7 plays, 54 yards, 3:21; Howard 14-0'
- (9:11) HOW – Tyriq Starks 15-yard run, Matt Conord PAT failed (Drive: 8 plays, 73 yards, 3:44; Howard 20–0)

Third Quarter

- (6:56) HOW – Travus Kerney 8-yard run, Matt Conord kick (Drive: 6 plays, 75 yards, 2:47; Howard 27–0)
- (0:26) HOW – Billy Roberson II 23-yard run, Matt Conord kick (Drive: 8 plays, 78 yards, 2:47; Howard 34–0)

Fourth Quarter

- (6:56) HAMP – Earl Woods III 53-yard run, Brett Starling kick (Drive: 3 plays, 87 yards, 1:08; Howard 34–7)

Statistics	HOW	HAMP
First downs	24	11
Total yards	456	215
Rushing yards	274	144
Passing yards	182	71
Passing: Comp–Att–Int	13-17-0	8-15-1
Time of possession	35:54	24:06

Team	Category	Player	Statistics
Howard	Passing	Tyriq Starks	12/15, 165 yards
Howard	Rushing	Travis Kerney	16 carries, 113 yards, 2 TD
Howard	Receiving	Montrell Walker	2 receptions, 44 yards
Hampton	Passing	Braden Davis	3/4, 32 yards
Hampton	Rushing	Earl Woods III	1 carry, 53 yards, TD
Hampton	Receiving	Khaioz Watford	2 receptions, 26 yards

=== at Elon ===
Hampton Pirates (1-3) vs. Elon Phoenix (2-2) – Game summary

Quarter	1	2	3	4	Total
Pirates	6	0	14	0	20
Phoenix	7	10	7	17	41

at Rhodes Stadium • Elon, NC

- Date: September 27
- Game time: 2:00 PM EDT
- TV announcers (FloSports): Taylor Durham (play-by-play), Dr. Khirey Walker (analyst) and Hannah Bradey (sideline)

Statistics	HAMP	ELON
First downs		
Total yards		
Rushing yards		
Passing yards		
Passing: Comp–Att–Int		
Time of possession		

Team	Category	Player	Statistics
Hampton	Passing		
Hampton	Rushing		
Hampton	Receiving		
Elon	Passing		
Elon	Rushing		
Elon	Receiving		

=== Norfolk State (Battle of the Bay) ===
Norfolk State Spartans (1-4) vs. Hampton Pirates (1-4) – Game summary

Quarter	1	2	3	4	Total
Spartans	14	7	3	10	34
Pirates	10	17	7	7	41

at Armstrong Stadium • Hampton, VA

- Date: October 4
- Game time: 4:00 PM EDT
- Game weather: Sunny • Temperature: 72 °F (22 °C)
- Game attendance: 9,710
- Referee: Jeremy DeAngulo
- TV announcers (FloSports): Nathan Epstein (play-by-play), Terence Green (analyst) and Tamara Brown (sideline)

Game information

First Quarter

- (11:49) HAMP – Brett Starling 39-yard field goal (Drive: 8 plays, 28 yards, 3:06; Hampton 3–0)
- (10:46) NORF – DreSean Kendrick 65-yard pass from Otto Kuhns, Marco Peery kick (Drive: 3 plays, 75 yards, 1:03; Norfolk State 7–3)
- (5:15) NORF – Jaylen Laudermilk 9-yard pass from Otto Kuhns, Marco Peery kick (Drive: 5 plays, 49 yards, 3:08; Norfolk State 14–3)
- (1:57) HAMP – Donovan Shepard 7-yard pass from Braden Davis, Brett Starling kick (Drive: 9 plays, 75 yards, 3:18; Norfolk State 14–10)

Second Quarter

- (12:17) NORF – Xzavion Evans 1-yard run, Marco Peery kick (Drive: 7 plays, 65 yards, 4:33; Norfolk State 21–10)
- (9:33) HAMP – Gracen Goldsmith 30-yard run, Brett Starling kick (Drive: 6 plays, 73 yards, 2:37; Norfolk State 21–17)
- (5:08) HAMP – Brett Starling 25-yard field goal (Drive: 7 plays, 30 yards, 2:54; Norfolk State 21–20)
- (1:29) HAMP – MarShawn Ferguson Jr. 14-yard run, Brett Starling kick (Drive: 5 plays, 53 yards, 0:43; Hampton 27–21)

Third Quarter

- (11:16) NORF – Marco Peery 28-yard field goal (Drive: 6 plays, 65 yards, 3:39; Hampton 27–24)
- (6:57) HAMP – Jah'Kei Chavis 4-yard run, Brett Starling kick (Drive: 9 plays, 68 yards, 4:18; Hampton 34–24)

Fourth Quarter

- (10:23) NORF – Ikeem Wright 18-yard pass from Otto Kuhns, Marco Peery kick (Drive: 7 plays, 72 yards, 2:21; Hampton 34–31)
- (8:52) HAMP – Braden Davis 21-yard run, Brett Starling kick (Drive: 3 plays, 50 yards, 1:23; Hampton 41–31)
- (4:02) NORF – Marco Peery 29-yard field goal (Drive: 11 plays, 60 yards, 4:43; Hampton 41–34)

Statistics	NORF	HAMP
First downs	27	29
Total yards	415	438
Rushing yards	173	236
Passing yards	242	202
Passing: Comp–Att–Int	15–25–0	16–28–1
Time of possession	28:21	31:39

Team	Category	Player	Statistics
Norfolk State	Passing	Otto Kuhns	15/25, 242 yards, 3 TD
Norfolk State	Rushing	Xzavion Evans	21 carries, 93 yards, TD
Norfolk State	Receiving	DreSean Kendrick	2 receptions, 120 yards, TD
Hampton	Passing	Braden Davis	16/28, 202 yards, TD, INT
Hampton	Rushing	Gracen Goldsmith	11 carries, 75 yards, TD
Hampton	Receiving	Maxwell Moss	4 receptions, 73 yards

=== Campbell ===
Campbell Fighting Camels (1-5) vs. Hampton Pirates (2-4) – Game summary

Quarter	1	2	3	4	Total
Fighting Camels	0	10	21	7	38
Pirates	0	14	0	7	21

at Armstrong Stadium • Hampton, VA

- Date: October 11
- Game time: 2:00 PM EDT
- TV announcers (FloFootball): Nathan Epstein (play-by-play), Terence Green (analyst) and Kylee Quinn (sideline)

Statistics	CAM	HAMP
First downs		
Total yards		
Rushing yards		
Passing yards		
Passing: Comp–Att–Int		
Time of possession		

Team	Category	Player	Statistics
Campbell	Passing		
Campbell	Rushing		
Campbell	Receiving		
Hampton	Passing		
Hampton	Rushing		
Hampton	Receiving		

=== at No. 15 Villanova ===
Hampton Pirates (2–5) at No. 15 Villanova Wildcats (4–2) – Game summary

Quarter	1	2	3	4	Total
Pirates	0	0	7	7	14
No. 15 Wildcats	21	28	0	7	56

at Villanova Stadium • Villanova, PA

- Date: October 18
- Game time: 1:00 PM EDT
- Game weather: Sunny • Temperature: 63 °F (17 °C) • Wind: SW at 6 miles per hour (9.7 km/h)
- Game attendance: 2,111
- Referee: Antonio Marcella
- TV: FloSports

Game information

First quarter

- VILL – Pat McQuaide 1-yard run (Jack Barnum kick), 9:06. Wildcats 7–0. Drive: 10 plays, 61 yards, 5:48.
- VILL – Chris Colby 65-yard pass from Pat McQuaide (Jack Barnum kick), 6:39. Wildcats 14–0. Drive: 1 play, 65 yards, 0:10.
- VILL – Lucas Kopecky 13-yard pass from Pat McQuaide (Jack Barnum kick), 1:43. Wildcats 21–0. Drive: 7 plays, 45 yards, 3:12.

Second quarter

- VILL – Luke Colella 34-yard pass from Pat McQuaide (Jack Barnum kick), 13:20. Wildcats 28–0. Drive: 3 plays, 53 yards, 1:29.
- VILL – Obinna Nwobodo 53-yard fumble return (Jack Barnum kick), 10:48. Wildcats 35–0.
- VILL – Antonio Johnson 10-yard pass from Pat McQuaide (Jack Barnum kick), 5:55. Wildcats 42–0. Drive: 5 plays, 40 yards, 2:18.
- VILL – Sean Brodnik 4-yard pass from Pat McQuaide (Jack Barnum kick), 1:50. Wildcats 49–0. Drive: 3 plays, 15 yards, 1:01.

Third quarter

- HAMP – Gracen Goldsmith 3-yard pass from Braden Davis (Brett Starling kick), 6:42. Wildcats 49–7. Drive: 8 plays, 29 yards, 3:40.

Fourth quarter

- VILL – Eli Smith 15-yard run (Luke Myers kick), 6:28. Wildcats 56–7. Drive: 6 plays, 80 yards, 3:24.
- HAMP – Earl Woods III 66-yard run (Brett Starling kick), 4:33. Wildcats 56–14. Drive: 4 plays, 77 yards, 1:47.

Statistics	HAMP	VILL
First downs	16	21
Plays–yards	63–270	51–395
Rushes–yards	40–176	35–220
Passing yards	94	175
Passing: Comp–Att–Int	12-23-1	12-16-0
Turnovers	2	0
Time of possession	33:37	26:23

Team	Category	Player	Statistics
Hampton	Passing	Braden Davis	10/17, 66 yards, TD, INT
Hampton	Rushing	Earl Woods III	7 carries, 102 yards, TD
Hampton	Receiving	Tae'Shaun Johnson	3 receptions, 30 yards
Villanova	Passing	Pat McQuaide	10/13, 166 yards, 5 TD
Villanova	Rushing	Tanner Maddocks	5 carries, 67 yards
Villanova	Receiving	Chris Colby	1 reception, 65 yards, TD

=== No. 10 Monmouth ===
No. 10 Monmouth Hawks (6-1) vs. Hampton Pirates (2-6) – Game summary

Quarter	1	2	3	4	Total
No. 10 Hawks	7	7	0	14	28
Pirates	3	0	7	0	10

at Armstrong Stadium • Hampton, VA

- Date: October 25
- Game time: 2:00 PM EDT
- Game weather: Sunny • Temperature: 60 °F (16 °C)
- Game attendance: 8,693
- Referee: Tom Zetts
- TV announcers (FloSports): Nathan Epstein (play-by-play), Terence Green (analyst) and Tamara Brown (sideline)

Game information

First Quarter

- (7:30) HAMP – Brett Starling 19-yard field goal (Drive: 10 plays, 59 yards, 4:56; Hampton 3-0)
- (5:16) MONM – Rodney Nelson 5-yard run, Hudson Fiene kick (Drive: 6 plays, 75 yards, 2:14; Monmouth 7-3)

Second Quarter

- (10:44) MONM – Rodney Nelson 3-yard run, Hudson Fiene kick (Drive: 13 plays, 87 yards, 4:16; Monmouth 14-3)

Third Quarter

- (12:44) HAMP – Gracen Goldsmith 1-yard run, Brett Starling kick (Drive: 6 plays, 91 yards, 2:12; Monmouth 14-10)

Fourth Quarter

- (9:36) MONM – Rodney Nelson 1-yard run, Hudson Fiene kick (Drive: 12 plays, 80 yards, 5:17; Monmouth 21-10)
- (2:03) MONM – Rodney Nelson 6-yard run, Hudson Fiene kick (Drive: 10 plays, 54 yards, 5:30; Monmouth 28-10)

Statistics	MONM	HAMP
First downs	26	20
Total yards	420	381
Rushing yards	298	119
Passing yards	122	262
Passing: Comp–Att–Int	14–25–1	22–34–1
Time of possession	30:01	29:59

Team	Category	Player	Statistics
Monmouth	Passing	Frankie Weaver	14/25, 122 yards, INT
Monmouth	Rushing	Rodney Nelson	33 carries, 233 yards, 4 TD
Monmouth	Receiving	Maxwell James	2 receptions, 30 yards
Hampton	Passing	Braden Davis	21/33, 242 yards, INT
Hampton	Rushing	Donovan Shepard	9 carries, 57 yards
Hampton	Receiving	Tae'Shaun Johnson	7 receptions, 104 yards

=== Maine ===
Maine Black Bears (5-4) vs. Hampton Pirates (2-7) – Game summary

Quarter	1	2	3	4	Total
Black Bears	-	-	-	-	0
Pirates	-	-	-	-	0

at Armstrong Stadium • Hampton, VA

- Date: November 8
- Game time: 1:00 PM EST

Statistics	ME	HAMP
First downs		
Total yards		
Rushing yards		
Passing yards		
Passing: Comp–Att–Int		
Time of possession		

Team	Category	Player	Statistics
Maine	Passing		
Maine	Rushing		
Maine	Receiving		
Hampton	Passing		
Hampton	Rushing		
Hampton	Receiving		

=== William & Mary ===
William & Mary Tribe (6-4) vs. Hampton Pirates (2-8) – Game summary

Quarter	1	2	3	4	Total
Tribe	14	24	17	0	55
Pirates	14	0	0	0	14

at Armstrong Stadium • Hampton, VA

- Date: November 15
- Game time: 1:00 PM EST

Statistics	W&M	HAMP
First downs		
Total yards		
Rushing yards		
Passing yards		
Passing: Comp–Att–Int		
Time of possession		

Team	Category	Player	Statistics
William & Mary	Passing		
William & Mary	Rushing		
William & Mary	Receiving		
Hampton	Passing		
Hampton	Rushing		
Hampton	Receiving		

=== at No. 10 Rhode Island ===
Hampton Pirates (2–9) at No. 10 Rhode Island Rams (9–2) – Game summary

Quarter	1	2	3	4	Total
Pirates	0	7	3	0	10
No. 10 Rams	21	3	7	7	38

at Meade Stadium • Kingston, RI

- Date: November 22
- Game time: 1:00 PM EST
- Game weather: Rain • Temperature: 46 °F (8 °C)
- Game attendance: 4,461
- Referee: Henry Wimberg
- TV: FloSports

Game information

First quarter

- URI – Antwain Littleton Jr. 65-yard run (Garth White kick), 12:24. Rams 7–0. Drive: 2 plays, 65 yards, 0:13.
- URI – Brendon Barrow 28-yard run (Garth White kick), 8:05. Rams 14–0. Drive: 5 plays, 70 yards, 2:15.
- URI – Antwain Littleton Jr. 6-yard run (Garth White kick), 1:13. Rams 21–0. Drive: 8 plays, 72 yards, 4:53.

Second quarter

- HAMP – Earl Woods III 44-yard run (Brett Starling kick), 6:12. Rams 21–7. Drive: 6 plays, 87 yards, 2:12.
- URI – Garth White 39-yard field goal, 0:07. Rams 24–7. Drive: 11 plays, 70 yards, 1:03.

Third quarter

- HAMP – Brett Starling 30-yard field goal, 9:14. Rams 24–10. Drive: 8 plays, 65 yards, 4:23.
- URI – Connor Finer 4-yard pass from Conner Kenyon (Garth White kick), 1:24. Rams 31–10. Drive: 10 plays, 56 yards, 4:23.

Fourth quarter

- URI – Omari Walker 61-yard pass from Conner Kenyon (Garth White kick), 9:17. Rams 38–10. Drive: 8 plays, 96 yards, 3:01.

Statistics	HAMP	URI
First downs	11	27
Plays–yards	56–276	79–610
Rushes–yards	29–140	31–201
Passing yards	136	409
Passing: Comp–Att–Int	19–27–1	32–48–0
Turnovers	1	1
Time of possession	28:10	31:50

Team	Category	Player	Statistics
Hampton	Passing	Earl Woods III	19/27, 136 yards, INT
Hampton	Rushing	Earl Woods III	11 carries, 87 yards, TD
Hampton	Receiving	Maxwell Moss	6 receptions, 58 yards
Rhode Island	Passing	Conner Kenyon	21/32, 258 yards, 2 TD
Rhode Island	Rushing	Antwain Littleton Jr.	19 carries, 148 yards, 2 TD
Rhode Island	Receiving	Greg Gaines III	8 receptions, 139 yards
