= DJ Boldin =

American gridiron football player and coach (born 1986)

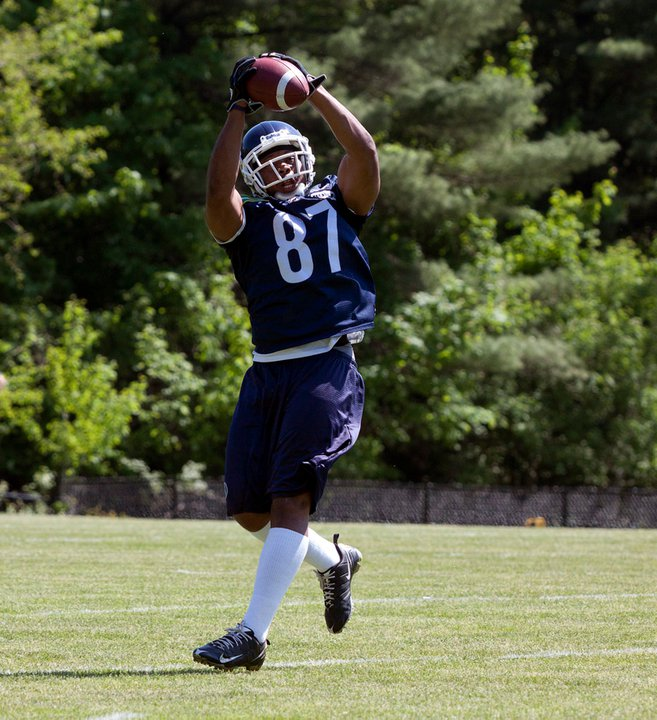
- Boldin with the Toronto Argonauts in 2011

Hampton Pirates
- Title: Offensive coordinator

Personal information
- Born: June 20, 1986 (age 40); Pahokee, Florida, U.S.
- Listed height: 6 ft 0 in (1.83 m)
- Listed weight: 208 lb (94 kg)

Career information
- College: Wake Forest
- NFL draft: 2009: undrafted

Career history

Playing
- Detroit Lions (2009)*; Montreal Alouettes (2009)*; Toronto Argonauts (2010–2011)
- * Offseason or practice squad member only

Coaching
- San Francisco 49ers (2013–2015) Offensive assistant; Middle College Program (2017) Offensive coordinator/quarterbacks coach; Saint Benedict at Auburndale High School (2018) Defensive coordinator/defensive backs coach; Pahokee High School (2019–2020) Head coach; Lake Erie College (2021) Wide receivers coach/co-special teams coordinator; Lake Erie College (2022–2023) Head coach; South Carolina State (2024–2025) Wide receivers coach; Hampton (2026–present) Offensive coordinator

Awards and highlights
- HBCU national champion (2025); Celebration Bowl champion (2025); MEAC champion (2024, 2025); EagleBank Bowl champion (2008); Meineke Car Care Bowl champion (2007); ACC champion (2006); First team All-ACC (2008); Sporting News ACC All-Freshman Team (2005)

Career CFL statistics
- Receptions: 3
- Receiving yards: 35
- Stats at CFL.ca (archived)

Head coaching record
- Career: 4–18 (.182)

Demir "D.J." Boldin (born June 20, 1986) is an American college football coach and former player. He is the offensive coordinator for Hampton University, a position he has held since 2024. He previously was the head football coach for Lake Erie College from 2022 to 2023. He has also served as an offensive assistant for the San Francisco 49ers of the National Football League. He played college football at Wake Forest. He signed with the Detroit Lions as an undrafted free agent in 2009.

== Early life ==
Boldin was selected as the Defensive Player of the Year by the Palm Beach Post. He was an A first-team all-state selection. He recorded 107 tackles, two interceptions and four forced fumbles as a senior in high school, along with 29 receptions for 691 yards and nine touchdowns as a wide receiver He was selected to the first-team all-state as a linebacker.

== College career ==
=== Redshirt Freshman ===
Boldin was named to The Sporting News' ACC All-Freshman Team. Boldin finished second on the team in receiving yards and fourth on the team in receptions. He played nine games and started six, where he recorded 15 receptions for 224 yards, a team-best 14.9 yards per catch. Boldin made his first career reception against Maryland, a 14-yard reception. He had three catches against Clemson for 36 yards. Boldin also had a season-high four receptions in Tallahassee against Florida State for 58 yards and Boldin caught three passes for 54 yards at Boston College. He had two receptions for 15 yards at Georgia Tech. He did not play in the season opener against Vanderbilt because of a coach's decision and missed the Miami game with injury.

=== Sophomore season ===
In 2006, Boldin sat out his sophomore season due to academic reasons, but was still a member of the football team.

=== Junior season ===
Boldin recorded 11 reception for 127 yards while appearing in all 13 games in which he had a successful return in 2007 after missing the 2006 season. Caught his first pass since 2005 when he snagged a 14-yarder in the season opener vs. Boston College (Sept. 1) ... Had two receptions vs. Virginia (Nov. 3) and Clemson (Nov. 10) ... Made two receptions for 47 yards in the Meineke Car Care Bowl ... His longest catch of the season was a 38-yarder that led to a first down on a third-and-17 against Connecticut.

=== Senior ===
Boldin led the ACC with 81 receptions and 848 yards, with 3 touchdowns. Boldin was second in the ACC with 65 yards per game, and averaged over 10 yards per catch. Boldin was second behind North Carolina wide receiver Hakeem Nicks. He finished his career with 107 receptions, 1,199 yards, and 3 touchdowns.

== Professional career ==
=== Detroit Lions ===
After going undrafted in the 2009 NFL draft, Boldin signed with the Detroit Lions as an undrafted free agent. In September 2009, Boldin was released on the day that final cuts were announced.

=== Toronto Argonauts ===
On October 19, 2010, Boldin signed with the Toronto Argonauts of the Canadian Football League. In the 2011 CFL season, Boldin recorded 3 receptions for 35 yards with the Argonauts.

== Personal life ==
Boldin's older brother is retired National Football League wide receiver Anquan Boldin. He is the cousin of four-time CFL All-Star defensive back Korey Banks.

== Head coaching record ==
Year	Team	Overall	Conference	Standing	Bowl/playoffs
Lake Erie Storm (Great Midwest Athletic Conference) (2022–2023)
2022	Lake Erie	3–8	3–5	6th	
2023	Lake Erie	1–10	0–9	10th	
Lake Erie:		4–18	3–14		
Total:		4–18			
