= 1996 Alabama A&M Bulldogs football team =

College football season

1996 Alabama A&M Bulldogs football
- Conference: Southern Intercollegiate Athletic Conference
- Record: 6–5 (3–3 SIAC)
- Head coach: Kenneth Pettiford (2nd season)
- Home stadium: Louis Crews Stadium

1996 Southern Intercollegiate Athletic Conference football standings
	Conf.			Overall
Team	W		L	W		L
No. 14 Albany State $^	5	–	1	8	–	3
Miles	3	–	3	6	–	4
Alabama A&M	3	–	3	6	–	5
Fort Valley State	3	–	3	6	–	5
Savannah State	3	–	3	6	–	5
Kentucky State	3	–	3	5	–	6
Clark Atlanta	3	–	3	5	–	6
Tuskegee	2	–	4	5	–	6
Morris Brown	2	–	4	3	–	8
Morehouse	0	–	6	2	–	9
$ – Conference champion; ^ – NCAA Division II playoff participant; Rankings from NCAA Division II Football Committee poll

The 1996 Alabama A&M Bulldogs football team represented Alabama A&M University as a member of the Southern Intercollegiate Athletic Conference (SIAC) during the 1996 NCAA Division II football season. Led by second-year head coach Kenneth Pettiford, the Bulldogs compiled an overall record of 6–5 with a mark of 3–3 in conference play, and finished tied for second place in the SIAC.

== Schedule ==
Date	Opponent	Site	Result	Attendance	Source
September 7	at No. 1 North Alabama*	Braly Municipal Stadium; Florence, AL	L 0–47	13,369	
September 14	Clark Atlanta	Louis Crews Stadium; Normal, AL	L 17–20 ^{OT}	12,500	
September 21	Savannah State	Louis Crews Stadium; Normal, AL	W 37–31	8,763	
September 28	at Morris Brown	Herndon Stadium; Atlanta, GA	L 8–16	2,520	
October 5	at Morehouse	B. T. Harvey Stadium; Atlanta, GA	W 44–11	4,982	
October 12	Albany State	Louis Crews Stadium; Normal, AL	L 7–14	4,123	
October 19	at Fort Valley State	Wildcat Stadium; Fort Valley, GA	W 17–13	10,015	
October 26	vs. Alabama State*	Legion Field; Birmingham, AL (Magic City Classic)	W 20–3	40,027	
November 2	Miles	Louis Crews Stadium; Normal, AL	W 36–22	3,821	
November 9	at Tuskegee	Abbott Memorial Alumni Stadium; Tuskegee, AL	W 21–7	22,879	
November 16	Kentucky State	Louis Crews Stadium; Normal, AL	L 29–30	4,337	
*Non-conference game; Rankings from NCAA Division II Football Committee Poll released prior to the game; Source:
