= Chennis Berry =

American football coach (born 1973)

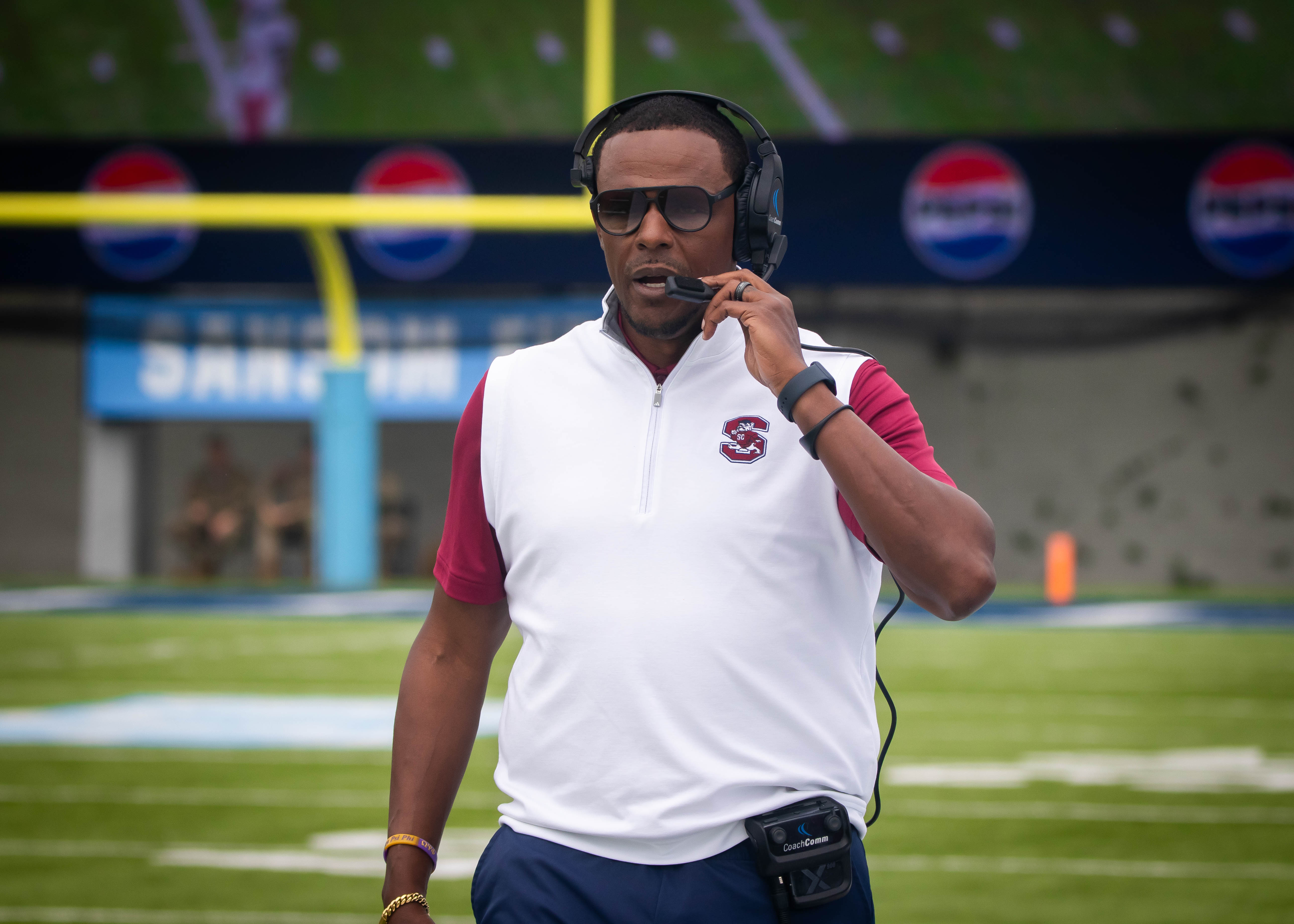

Current position
- Title: Head coach
- Team: South Carolina State
- Conference: MEAC
- Record: 29–8

Biographical details
- Born: April 16, 1973 (age 53); Cleveland, Ohio, U.S.

Playing career
- 1991–1994: Savannah State
- Position: Offensive tackle

Coaching career (HC unless noted)
- 1996: Morris Brown (assistant)
- 1997–2000: Kentucky State (OL/TE)
- 2001–2002: Fort Valley State (OL/TE)
- 2003–2005: North Carolina A&T (OL)
- 2006–2008: Morgan State (OC)
- 2009–2010: North Carolina A&T (AHC/OC/OL)
- 2011–2012: Howard (co-OC/OL)
- 2013–2015: Southern (OC/OL)
- 2016–2019: Southern (AHC/OC/OL)
- 2020–2023: Benedict
- 2024–present: South Carolina State

Head coaching record
- Overall: 56–15
- Bowls: 1–1
- Tournaments: 0–2 (NCAA D-II playoffs)

Accomplishments and honors

Championships
- 1 black college national (2025); 2 NCAA D-II black college national (2022–2023); 2 SIAC (2022–2023); SIAC East Division (2022); 3 MEAC (2024–2026)

Awards
- First Team All-SIAC (1994); Division II Region Two Coach of the Year (2022 & 2023); Division I FCS Region Two Coach of the Year (2024)

Chennis Berry Jr. (born April 16, 1973) is an American college football coach. He is the head football coach for South Carolina State University, a position he has held since December 2023. He was previously the head football coach for Benedict College from 2020 to 2023.

Berry also coached for Morris Brown, Kentucky State, Fort Valley State, North Carolina A&T, Morgan State, Howard, and Southern. He played college football for Savannah State as an offensive tackle.

== Head coaching record ==
Year	Team	Overall	Conference	Standing	Bowl/playoffs	AFCA/STATS^{#}	D2/Coaches'^{°}
Benedict Tigers (Southern Intercollegiate Athletic Conference) (2020–2023)
2020–21	No team—COVID-19						
2021	Benedict	5–5	2–4	5th (East)			
2022	Benedict	11–1	7–0	1st (East)	L NCAA Division II Second Round	12	
2023	Benedict	11–1	8–0	1st	L NCAA Division II Second Round	12	14
Benedict:		27–7	17–4				
South Carolina State Bulldogs (Mid-Eastern Athletic Conference) (2024–present)
2024	South Carolina State	9–3	5–0	1st	L Celebration	24	20
2025	South Carolina State	10–3	5–0	1st	W Celebration	21	25
2026	South Carolina State	10–2	5–0	1st	Celebration		
South Carolina State:		29–8	15–0				
Total:		56–15					
National championship Conference title Conference division title or championship game berth
