= Richard Basil =

American football player and coach (born 1967)

Biographical details
- Born: September 28, 1967 (age 59); Demopolis, Alabama, U.S.

Playing career
- 1988–1989: Savannah State
- Position: Quarterback

Coaching career (HC unless noted)
- 1993: Savannah State (QB)
- 1994–1995: Tennessee State (QB)
- 1996: Johnson C. Smith (assistant)
- 1997–2003: Savannah State (assistant)
- 2003–2005: Savannah State

Head coaching record
- Overall: 2–26

Richard Basil (September 28, 1967) is the former head football coach at Savannah State University in Savannah, Georgia.

== Playing career ==
Basil played a quarterback at East Central Community College before transferring to Savannah State. He quarterbacked the Tigers for two seasons (1988 and 1989) compiling a 16–3 record as a starter and rushed for 18 touchdowns and passed for 3,645 yards and 44 TDs. He was named the Southern Intercollegiate Athletic Conference Offensive Player of the Year and the George H. Hopson Offensive Back of the Year in 1988. In 1989, he led NCAA Division II in passing percentage, completing 120 of his 211 attempts (.569 percent) for 2,148 yards and 29 TDs.

== Coaching career ==
=== Assistant coach ===
Basil began his coaching career as an assistant coach at Savannah State College in 1993. He served as the quarterbacks and receivers coach under Joe Crosby. In 1994, he moved to Tennessee State University as quarterbacks coach under Bill Davis. In 1996, he accepted an assistant coaching position at Johnson C. Smith University under Daryl McNeill and joined McNeill's staff when he became the head coach at Savannah State in 1997. He remained at Savannah State following McNeill's departure, coaching quarterbacks and kickers for Steve Wilks (1999) and Bill Davis (2000–2001). In 2002 and 2003, Basil coached defensive backs for Ken Pettiford until he was named as the Tigers interim coach following the fourth game of the 2003 season.

=== Savannah State ===
Basil became the Tigers head football coach in 2003 after the firing of coach Ken Pettiford following the fourth game of the 2003 season. Basil resigned on March 14, 2006, after compiling a 2–26 record in 2 ½ seasons. His annual salary at Savannah State was $61,164.

== Personal life ==
Basil is married to the former Mary Daise of St. Helena, South Carolina. He was awarded the President's Volunteer Service Award for outstanding community service on December 14, 2009.
