= 2025 South Carolina State Bulldogs football team =

American college football season

2025 South Carolina State Bulldogs football
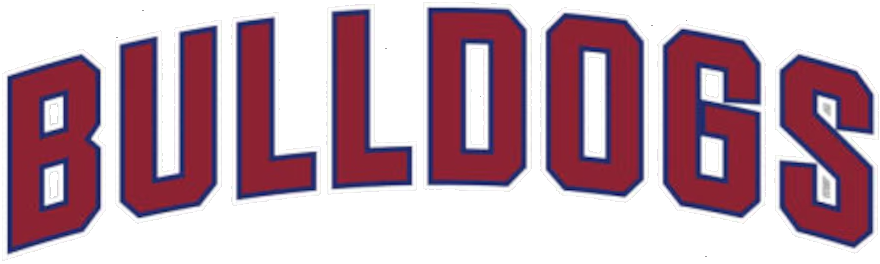

Black college national champion MEAC champion Celebration Bowl champion

Celebration Bowl, W 40–38 ^{4OT} vs. Prairie View A&M
- Conference: Mid-Eastern Athletic Conference

Ranking
- STATS: No. 21
- FCS Coaches: No. 25
- Record: 10–3 (5–0 MEAC)
- Head coach: Chennis Berry (2nd season)
- Offensive coordinator: Johnathan Williams (2nd season)
- Offensive scheme: Spread option
- Defensive coordinator: Jordan Odaffer (2nd season)
- Base defense: Multiple 4–2–5
- Home stadium: Oliver C. Dawson Stadium

2025 Mid-Eastern Athletic Conference football standings
	Conf.			Overall
Team	W		L	W		L
No. 21 South Carolina State $	5	–	0	10	–	3
Delaware State	4	–	1	8	–	4
North Carolina Central	3	–	2	8	–	4
Howard	2	–	3	5	–	7
Morgan State	1	–	4	4	–	8
Norfolk State	0	–	5	1	–	11
$ – Conference champion; Rankings from STATS Poll

The 2025 South Carolina State Bulldogs football team represented South Carolina State University as a member of the Mid-Eastern Athletic Conference (MEAC) during the 2025 NCAA Division I FCS football season. The Bulldogs were led by second-year head coach Chennis Berry. South Carolina State played their home games at Oliver C. Dawson Stadium in Orangeburg, South Carolina.

The Bulldogs finished the regular season with an overall record of 9–3. The team went 5–0 in MEAC play to win the program's second straight MEAC title. South Carolina State faced off against Prairie View A&M in the Celebration Bowl; the Bulldogs fell behind 21–0 entering halftime before coming back in the second half to tie the game at 35–35 and force overtime. The two teams traded field goals in the first overtime and in the second overtime period the Panthers intercepted a Ryan Stubblefield pass, but missed a 31-yard field goal on their ensuing possession. Both teams failed their respective two-point conversion in the third overtime. In the fourth overtime period, the Bulldogs converted their attempt while the Panthers' attempt fell incomplete, sealing a 40–38 victory for South Carolina State, the seventh Celebration Bowl victory for a MEAC team. This was also the seventh Black college national championship for the Bulldogs.

== Preseason ==
=== MEAC prediction poll ===
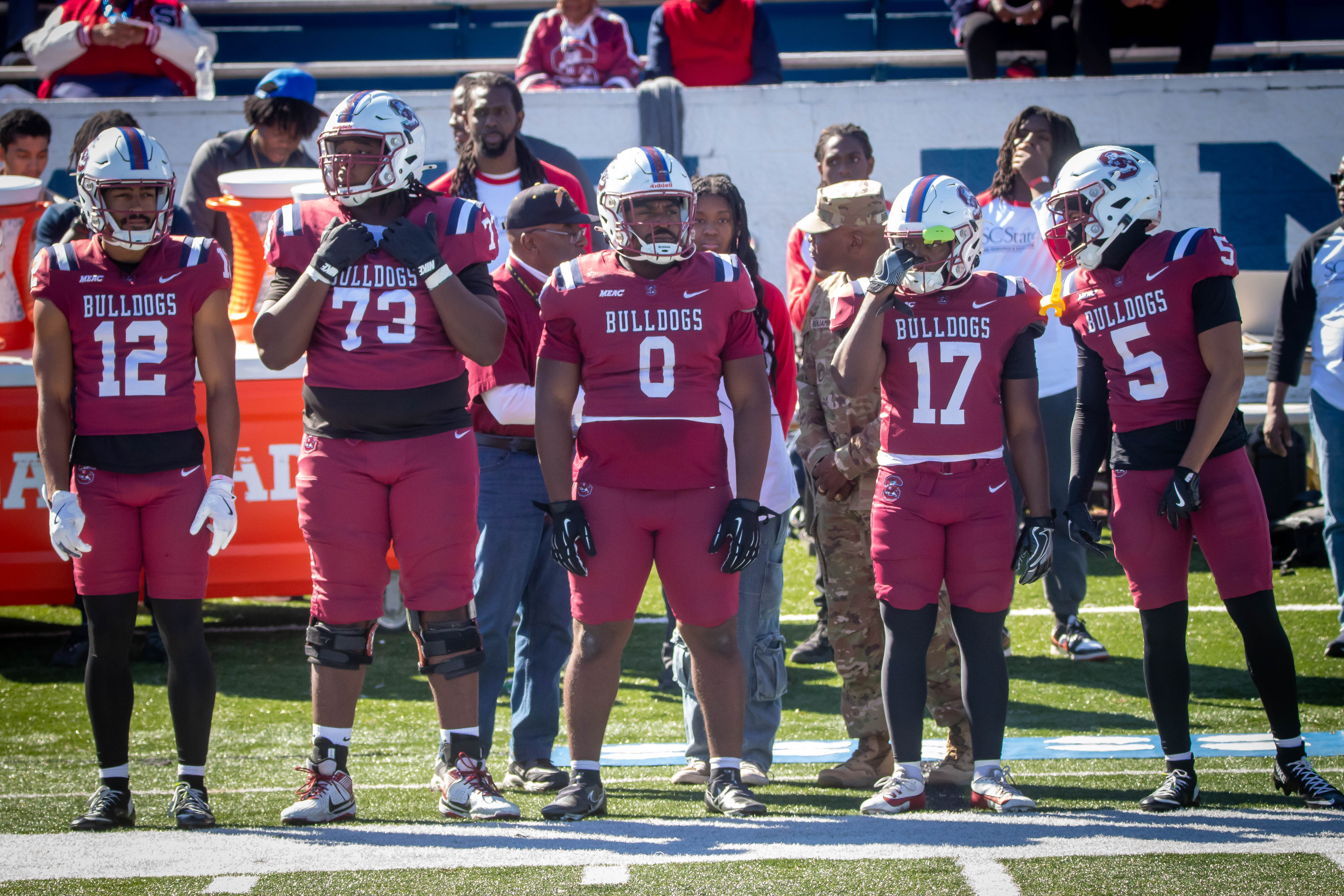
SC State University Football Team

The MEAC released its preseason prediction poll on July 22, 2025. The Bulldogs were predicted to finish first in the conference, receiving 63 overall points and 5 of the 9 first place votes, narrowly edging out North Carolina Central, who had 61 and 4, respectively.

=== Preseason All-MEAC team ===
First team defense

Jarod Washington (DB)

Second team offense

Roger Smith (OL)

Second team defense

Josh Barker (DL)

== Schedule ==
Date	Time	Opponent	Site	TV	Result	Attendance
August 30	6:00 p.m.	Wofford*	Oliver C. Dawson Stadium; Orangeburg, SC	ESPN+	W 16–15	6,208
September 6	7:00 p.m.	at No. 10 (FBS) South Carolina*	Williams–Brice Stadium; Columbia, SC	SECN+/ESPN+	L 10–38	79,705
September 13	6:00 p.m.	Bethune–Cookman*	Oliver C. Dawson Stadium; Orangeburg, SC	ESPN+	W 55–41	9,026
September 20	12:00 p.m.	at South Florida (FBS)*	Raymond James Stadium; Tampa, FL	ESPN+	L 14–63	28,461
September 27	6:00 p.m.	at Charleston Southern*	Buccaneer Field; North Charleston, SC	ESPN+	L 24–31	6,211
October 4	1:30 p.m.	Savannah State*^{†}	Oliver C. Dawson Stadium; Orangeburg, SC	ESPN+	W 49–6	24,322
October 11	1:00 p.m.	at North Carolina A&T*	Truist Stadium; Greensboro, NC (rivalry)	FloSports	W 22–16	21,500
October 25	2:00 p.m.	at Norfolk State	William "Dick" Price Stadium; Norfolk, VA	ESPN+	W 51–20	47,273
November 1	2:00 p.m.	Morgan State	Oliver C. Dawson Stadium; Orangeburg, SC	ESPN+	W 36–30	14,061
November 8	2:00 p.m.	Howard	Oliver C. Dawson Stadium; Orangeburg, SC	ESPN+	W 42–12	9,892
November 14	5:30 p.m.	at North Carolina Central	O'Kelly–Riddick Stadium; Durham, NC	ESPN2	W 34–27	7,291
November 22	1:00 p.m.	at Delaware State	Alumni Stadium; Dover, DE	ESPN+	W 28–17	4,077
December 13	12:00 p.m.	vs. Prairie View A&M*	Mercedes-Benz Stadium; Atlanta, GA (Celebration Bowl)	ABC	W 40–38 ^{4OT}	26,703
*Non-conference game; ^{†}Homecoming; Rankings from STATS Poll released prior to the game; All times are in Eastern time

== Rankings ==
Ranking movements Legend: ██ Increase in ranking ██ Decrease in ranking — = Not ranked RV = Received votes
	Week														
Poll	Pre	1	2	3	4	5	6	7	8	9	10	11	12	13	Final
STATS	RV	RV	RV	RV	—	—	—	—	—	—	—	RV	RV	RV	21
Coaches	RV	RV	RV	RV	—	—	—	—	—	—	RV	RV	RV	RV	25

== Game summaries ==
=== Wofford ===
Wofford Terriers (0–0) at South Carolina State Bulldogs (0–0) – Game summary

Quarter	1	2	3	4	Total
Terriers	0	7	0	8	15
Bulldogs	3	3	3	7	16

at Oliver C. Dawson Stadium • Orangeburg, South Carolina

- Date: August 30
- Game time: 6:00 p.m. EDT
- Game weather: Sunny, 85 °F (29 °C)
- Game attendance: 6,208
- Referee: Javarro Edwards
- TV: ESPN+
- Box score, Recap

Game information
First quarter
- SCST – Nico Cavanillas Alti 33-yard field goal, 6:47. Bulldogs 3–0. Drive: 18 plays, 63 yards, 8:08.

Second quarter

- SCST – Nico Cavanillas Alti 40-yard field goal, 2:51. Bulldogs 6–0. Drive: 8 plays, 35 yards, 1:12.
- WOF – Colby Alexander 89-yard kickoff return (Connor Deviney kick), 2:17. Terriers 7–6.

Third quarter

- SCST – Nico Cavanillas Alti 24-yard field goal, 8:33. Bulldogs 9–7. Drive: 11 plays, 54 yards, 4:29.

Fourth quarter

- WOF – C. J. Adams 0-yard blocked punt return (pass failed), 12:22. Terriers 13–9.
- WOF – William Atkins IV sacked in own end zone by Brandon Maina, 9:11. Terriers 15–9.
- SCST – Shamontae Burgess 12-yard pass from Ryan Stubblefield (Nico Cavanillas Alti kick), 1:29. Bulldogs 16–15. Drive: 10 plays, 74 yards, 3:11.

Statistics	WOF	SCST
First downs	10	23
Total yards	142	410
Rushing yards	86	111
Passing yards	56	299
Passing: Comp–Att–Int	6–21–0	27–50–0
Time of possession	25:47	34:13

Team	Category	Player	Statistics
Wofford	Passing	Jayden Whitaker	6/21, 56 yards
Wofford	Rushing	Gerald Modest	7 carries, 34 yards
Wofford	Receiving	C. J. Adams	1 reception, 16 yards
South Carolina State	Passing	William Atkins IV	17/33, 175 yards
South Carolina State	Rushing	K. Z. Adams	15 carries, 50 yards
South Carolina State	Receiving	Jalen Johnson	6 receptions, 93 yards

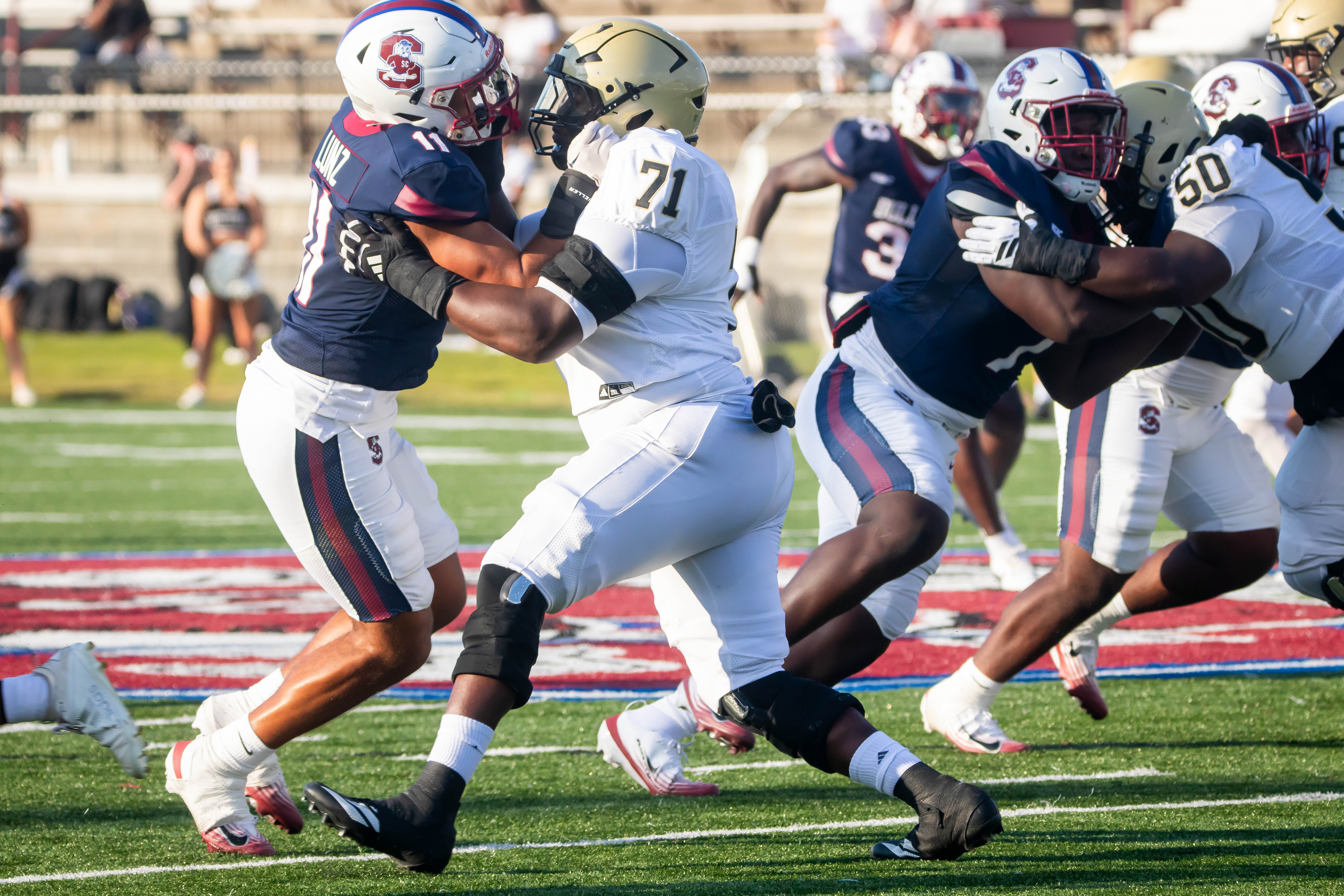
Wofford at SCSU 2025

=== at No. 10 (FBS) South Carolina ===
South Carolina State Bulldogs (1–0) at No. 10 (FBS) South Carolina Gamecocks (1–0) – Game summary

Quarter	1	2	3	4	Total
Bulldogs	3	0	0	7	10
No. 10 (FBS) Gamecocks	0	17	21	0	38

at Williams–Brice Stadium • Columbia, South Carolina

- Date: September 6
- Game time: 7:00 p.m. EDT
- Game weather: Clear, 86 °F (30 °C)
- Game attendance: 79,705
- Referee: Lee Hedrick
- TV announcers (SECN+/ESPN+): Kevin Fitzgerald (play-by-play), Charles Arbuckle (analyst), and Ashley Stroehlein (sideline reporter)

Game information
First quarter
- SCST – Nico Cavanillas Alti 21–yard field goal, 01:32. Bulldogs 3–0. Drive: 9 plays, 54 yards, 04:02.

Second quarter

- SC – Vicari Swain 65-yard punt return (William Joyce kick), 05:01. Gamecocks 7–3.
- SC – Vicari Swain 42-yard punt return (William Joyce kick), 03:07. Gamecocks 14–3.
- SC – William Joyce 49-yard field goal, 3:42. Gamecocks 17–3. Drive: 9 plays, 44 yards, 01:44.

Third quarter

- SC – Oscar Adaway III 5-yard run (William Joyce kick), 11:23. Gamecocks 24–3. Drive: 8 plays, 65 yards, 03:36.
- SC – Jaron Willis 46-yard fumble return (William Joyce kick), 06:02. Gamecocks 31–3.
- SC – Vandrevius Jacobs 35-yard pass from LaNorris Sellers (William Joyce kick), 02:25. Gamecocks 38–3. Drive: 5 plays, 52 yards, 02:05.

Fourth quarter

- SCST – Nicholas Sowell 9-yard pass from Ryan Stubblefield (Elliott Janish kick), 12:32. Gamecocks 38–10. Drive: 5 plays, 52 yards, 02:22.

Statistics	SCST	SC
First downs	13	16
Total yards	270	253
Rushing yards	62	125
Passing yards	208	128
Passing: Comp–Att–Int	18–28–0	11–20–0
Time of possession	34:39	25:21

Team	Category	Player	Statistics
South Carolina State	Passing	William Atkins IV	10/14, 118 yards
South Carolina State	Rushing	Kacy Fields	5 carries, 19 yards
South Carolina State	Receiving	Jalen Johnson	5 receptions, 67 yards
South Carolina	Passing	LaNorris Sellers	11/19, 128 yards, TD
South Carolina	Rushing	Jawarn Howell	7 carries, 30 yards
South Carolina	Receiving	Vandrevius Jacobs	4 receptions, 57 yards, TD

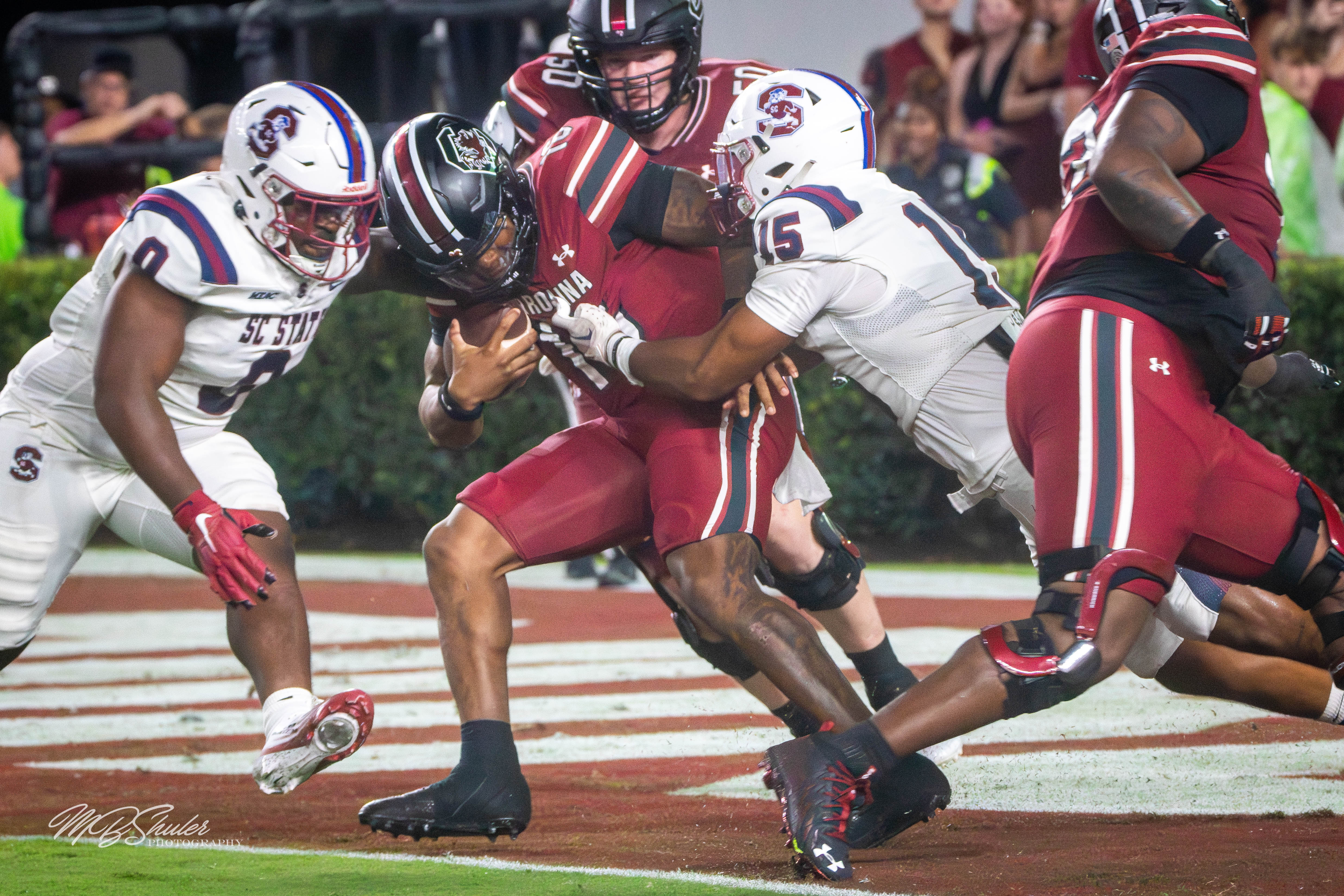
SCSU vs USC 2025

=== Bethune–Cookman ===
Bethune–Cookman Wildcats (0–2) at South Carolina State Bulldogs (1–1) – Game summary

Quarter	1	2	3	4	Total
Wildcats	0	7	6	28	41
Bulldogs	24	3	14	14	55

at Oliver C. Dawson Stadium • Orangeburg, South Carolina

- Date: September 13
- Game time: 6:00 p.m. EDT
- Game weather: Sunny, 85 °F (29 °C)
- Game attendance: 9,026
- Referee: Jason Soistman
- TV: ESPN+

Game information
First quarter
- SCST – Ryan Stubblefield 3-yard run (Nico Cavanillas Alti kick), 10:20. Bulldogs 7–0. Drive: 14 plays, 83 yards, 4:35.
- SCST – K. Z. Adams 1-yard run (Nico Cavanillas Alti kick), 6:09. Bulldogs 14–0. Drive: 7 plays, 63 yards, 2:22.
- SCST – Malik Harp 4-yard fumble return (Nico Cavanillas Alti kick), 4:39. Bulldogs 21–0.
- SCST – Nico Cavanillas Alti 44-yard field goal, 0:13. Bulldogs 24–0. Drive: 8 plays, 61 yards, 3:07.

Second quarter

- SCST – Nico Cavanillas Alti 41-yard field goal, 10:20. Bulldogs 27–0. Drive: 11 plays, 35 yards, 3:30.
- BCU – Cam'Ron Ransom 2-yard run (Juan Dominguez kick), 1:56. Bulldogs 27–7. Drive: 16 plays, 75 yards, 8:24.

Third quarter

- BCU – Myles Morales 19-yard pass from Cam'Ron Ransom (kick failed), 11:17. Bulldogs 27–13. Drive: 8 plays, 75 yards, 3:43.
- SCST – Ryan Stubblefield 13-yard run (Nico Cavanillas Alti kick), 7:53. Bulldogs 34–13. Drive: 9 plays, 67 yards, 3:16.
- SCST – Jordan Smith 8-yard pass from Ryan Stubblefield (Nico Cavanillas Alti kick), 0:04. Bulldogs 41–13. Drive: 7 plays, 80 yards, 3:51.

Fourth quarter

- BCU – Maleek Huggins 52-yard pass from Cam'Ron Ransom (Juan Dominguez kick), 13:50. Bulldogs 41–20. Drive: 3 plays, 84 yards, 1:10.
- BCU – Cam'Ron Ransom 11-yard run (Juan Dominguez kick), 9:01. Bulldogs 41–27. Drive: 7 plays, 67 yards, 3:17.
- SCST – Mason Pickett-Hicks 69-yard run (Nico Cavanillas Alti kick), 6:54. Bulldogs 48–27. Drive: 4 plays, 84 yards, 1:58.
- BCU – Lorenzo Jenkins 21-yard pass from Cam'Ron Ransom (Juan Dominguez kick), 3:58. Bulldogs 48–34. Drive: 7 plays, 75 yards, 2:51.
- SCST – Tyler Smith 2-yard run (Nico Cavanillas Alti kick), 0:41. Bulldogs 55–34. Drive: 8 plays, 74 yards, 3:16.
- BCU – Maleek Huggins 35-yard pass from Cam'Ron Ransom (Juan Dominguez kick), 0:07. Bulldogs 55–41. Drive: 4 plays, 35 yards, 0:23.

Statistics	BCU	SCST
First downs	29	28
Total yards	507	561
Rushing yards	182	226
Passing yards	325	335
Passing: Comp–Att–Int	23–38–1	22–37–0
Time of possession	31:26	28:34

Team	Category	Player	Statistics
Bethune–Cookman	Passing	Cam'Ron Ransom	20/30, 302 yards, 4 TD
Bethune–Cookman	Rushing	Cam'Ron Ransom	11 carries, 78 yards, TD
Bethune–Cookman	Receiving	Maleek Huggins	8 receptions, 148 yards, 2 TD
South Carolina State	Passing	Ryan Stubblefield	21/35, 286 yards, TD
South Carolina State	Rushing	Mason Pickett-Hicks	4 carries, 87 yards, TD
South Carolina State	Receiving	Jordan Smith	9 receptions, 87 yards, TD

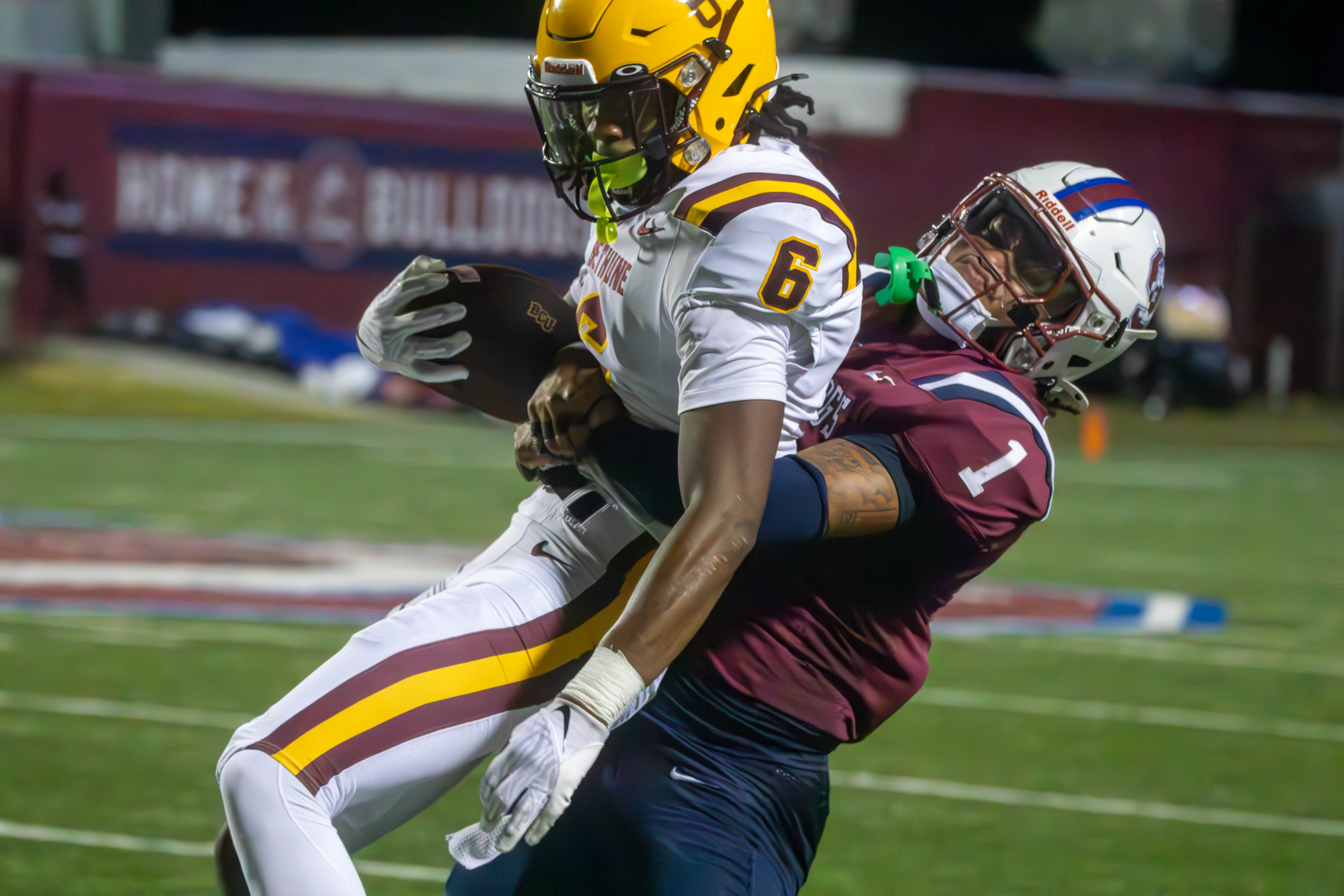
BCUvsSCSU 2025

=== at South Florida (FBS) ===
South Carolina State Bulldogs (2–1) at South Florida Bulls (FBS) (2–1) – Game summary

Quarter	1	2	3	4	Total
Bulldogs	0	7	0	7	14
Bulls (FBS)	7	14	35	7	63

at Raymond James Stadium • Tampa, Florida

- Date: September 20
- Game time: 12:00 p.m. EDT
- Game weather: Sunny • Temperature: 89 °F (32 °C) • Wind: NE at 6 miles per hour (9.7 km/h)
- Game attendance: 28,461
- Referee: Edwin Lee
- TV announcers (ESPN+): Chuckie Kempf (play-by-play), Darius Walker (analyst) and Maria Trivelpiece (sideline)

Game information
First quarter
- USF – Mac Harris 93-yard interception return (Nico Gramatica kick), 9:27. Bulls 7–0.

Second quarter

- USF – Jonathan Echols 22-yard pass from Byrum Brown (Nico Gramatica kick), 13:56. Bulls 14–0. Drive: 8 plays, 67 yards, 2:26.
- USF – Joshua Porter 26-yard pass from Byrum Brown (Nico Gramatica kick), 6:20. Bulls 21–0. Drive: 9 plays, 93 yards, 2:21.
- SCST – Kacy Fields 1-yard run (Nico Cavanillas Alti kick), 0:26. Bulls 21–7. Drive: 5 plays, 27 yards, 1:30.

Third quarter

- USF – Chas Nimrod 42-yard pass from Byrum Brown (Nico Gramatica kick), 13:53. Bulls 28–7. Drive: 5 plays, 53 yards, 0:59.
- USF – Nykahi Davenport 43-yard run (Nico Gramatica kick), 12:49. Bulls 35–7. Drive: 1 play, 43 yards, 0:08.
- USF – Ashton Mosley 4-yard blocked punt return (Nico Gramatica kick), 9:16. Bulls 42–7.
- USF – Chas Nimrod 22-yard pass from Byrum Brown (Nico Gramatica kick), 6:40. Bulls 49–7. Drive: 3 plays, 65 yards, 0:56.
- USF – Sam Franklin 30-yard run (Adam Zouagui kick), 5:28. Bulls 56–7. Drive: 1 play, 30 yards, 0:08.

Fourth quarter

- SCST – Julian Milligan 17-yard run (Nico Cavanillas Alti kick), 8:02. Bulls 56–14. Drive: 4 plays, 46 yards, 1:11.
- USF – Sam Franklin 54-yard run (Adam Zouagui kick), 6:28. Bulls 63–14. Drive: 5 plays, 68 yards, 1:27.

Statistics	SCST	USF
First downs	20	20
Plays–yards	80–305	54–504
Rushes–yards	38–70	28–252
Passing yards	235	252
Passing: comp–att–int	25–42–1	18–26–1
Turnovers	1	1
Time of possession	43:07	16:53

Team	Category	Player	Statistics
South Carolina State	Passing	William Atkins IV	18/28, 151 yards
South Carolina State	Rushing	Kacy Fields	7 carries, 24 yards, TD
South Carolina State	Receiving	Deyandre Ruffin	4 receptions, 41 yards
South Florida	Passing	Byrum Brown	14/20, 236 yards, 4 TD, INT
South Florida	Rushing	Sam Franklin	4 carries, 91 yards, 2 TD
South Florida	Receiving	Chas Nimrod	4 receptions, 119 yards, 2 TD

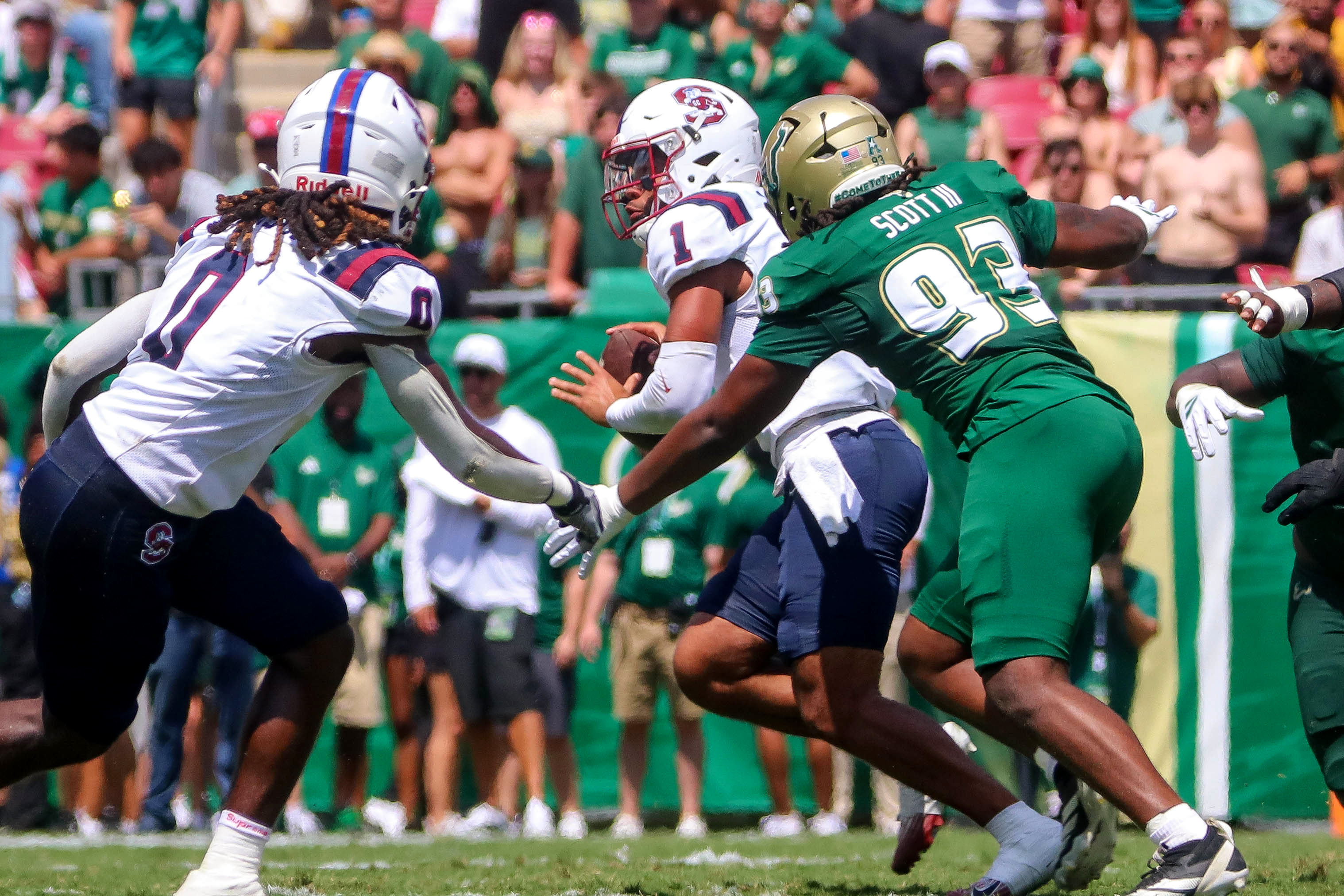
SCSU vs USF 2025

=== at Charleston Southern ===
South Carolina State Bulldogs (2–2) at Charleston Southern Buccaneers (0–4) – Game summary

Quarter	1	2	3	4	Total
Bulldogs	0	14	7	3	24
Buccaneers	14	7	0	10	31

at Buccaneer Field • North Charleston, South Carolina

- Date: September 27
- Game time: 6:00 p.m. EDT
- Game weather: Sunny
- Game attendance: 6,211
- Referee: Michael Causey
- TV announcers (ESPN+): Justin Biegel (play-by-play), Jack Delongchamps (analyst) and Ford Werness (sideline)

Game information
First quarter
- CHSO – Quay Kindell 38-yard pass from Zolten Osborne (Zach Gordon kick), 11:26. Buccaneers 7–0. Drive: 4 plays, 71 yards, 1:59.
- CHSO – Ke'Marion Baldwin 26-yard run (Zach Gordon kick), 6:26. Buccaneers 14–0. Drive: 6 plays, 79 yards, 3:06.

Second quarter

- SCST – Ryan Stubblefield 3-yard run (Nico Cavanillas Alti kick), 12:58. Buccaneers 14–7. Drive: 10 plays, 85 yards, 4:23.
- SCST – Ryan Stubblefield 4-yard run (Nico Cavanillas Alti kick), 4:56. Tied 14–14. Drive: 11 plays, 71 yards, 5:06.
- CHSO – Champ Bentley 0-yard fumble return (Zach Gordon kick), 1:06. Buccaneers 21–14.

Third quarter

- SCST – Tyler Smith 19-yard run (Nico Cavanillas Alti kick), 6:53. Tied 21–21. Drive: 6 plays, 80 yards, 2:16.

Fourth quarter

- CHSO – Zach Gordon 37-yard field goal, 8:40. Buccaneers 24–21. Drive: 13 plays, 61 yards, 5:35.
- SCST – Nico Cavanillas Alti 50-yard field goal, 3:56. Tied 24–24. Drive: 10 plays, 35 yards, 4:34.
- CHSO – Ke'Marion Baldwin 10-yard run (Zach Gordon kick), 1:03. Buccaneers 31–24. Drive: 6 plays, 65 yards, 2:53.

Statistics	SCST	CHSO
First downs	25	18
Total yards	449	345
Rushing yards	255	147
Passing yards	194	198
Passing: Comp–Att–Int	18–26–0	13–28–1
Time of possession	33:47	26:13

Team	Category	Player	Statistics
South Carolina State	Passing	Ryan Stubblefield	18/24, 194 yards
South Carolina State	Rushing	Tyler Smith	13 carries, 85 yards, TD
South Carolina State	Receiving	Jalen Johnson	8 receptions, 77 yards
Charleston Southern	Passing	Zolten Osbourne	13/28, 198 yards, TD, INT
Charleston Southern	Rushing	Ke'Marion Baldwin	18 carries, 122 yards, 2 TD
Charleston Southern	Receiving	Chris Rhone	5 receptions, 106 yards

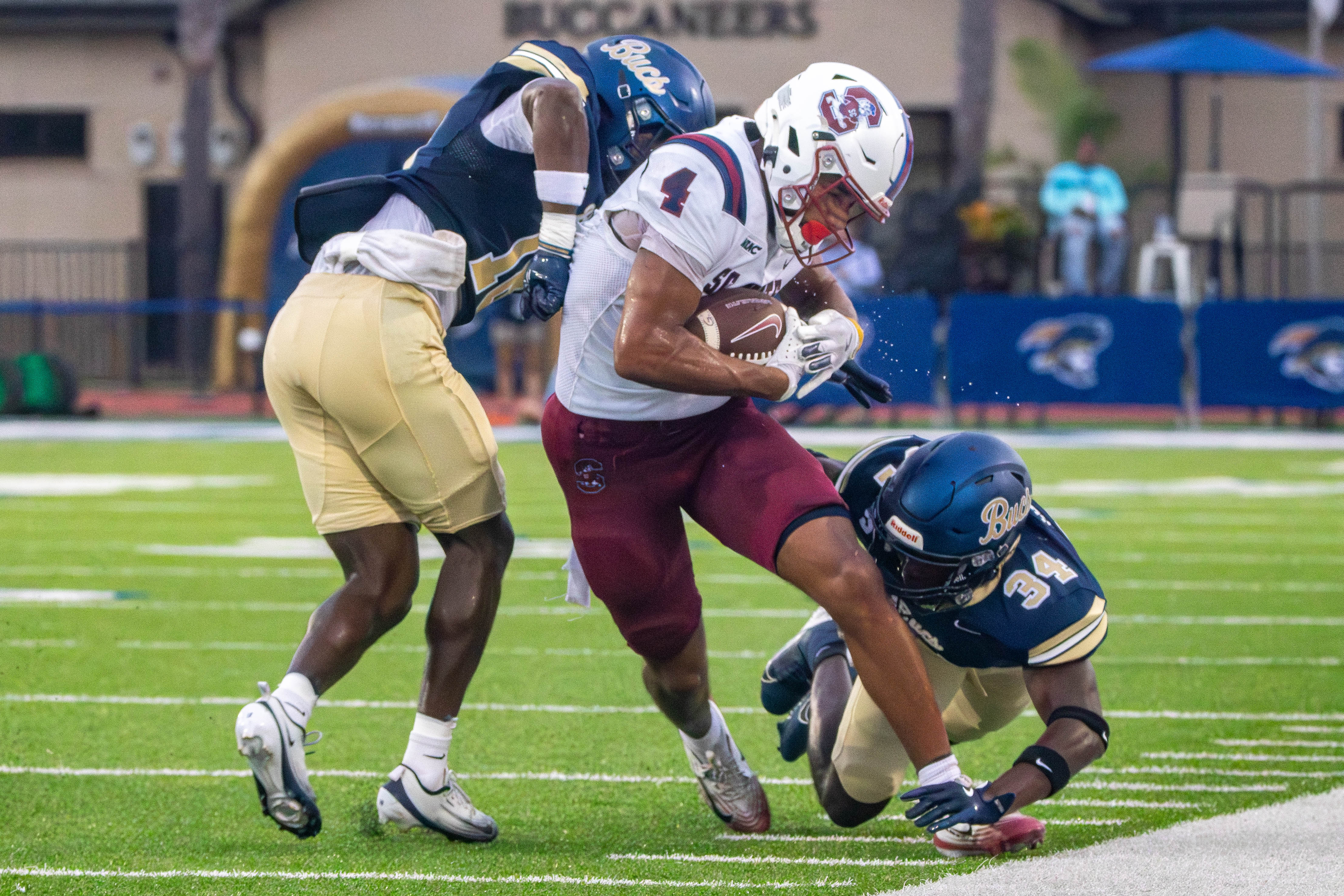
SCSU vs CSU 2025

=== Savannah State (DII) ===
Savannah State Tigers (DII) (2–2) at South Carolina State Bulldogs (2–3) – Game summary

Quarter	1	2	3	4	Total
Tigers (DII)	3	0	3	0	6
Bulldogs	14	7	14	14	49

at Oliver C. Dawson Stadium • Orangeburg, South Carolina

- Date: October 4
- Game time: 1:30 p.m. EDT
- Game weather: Sunny, 85 °F (29 °C)
- Game attendance: 24,322
- Referee: Derek Hatten
- TV: ESPN+

Game information

First quarter

- SAV – Jimmy Tran 41-yard field goal, 10:58. Tigers 3–0. Drive: 4 plays, -10 yards, 2:03.
- SCST – Charles Arnold 91-yard interception return (Nico Cavanillas Alti kick), 5:46. Bulldogs 7–3.
- SCST – Deyandre Ruffin 21-yard pass from Ryan Stubblefield (Nico Cavanillas Alti kick), 1:55. Bulldogs 14–3. Drive: 5 plays, 46 yards, 2:18.

Second quarter

- SCST – Nigel Johnson 19-yard pass from Ryan Stubblefield (Nico Cavanillas Alti kick), 2:58. Bulldogs 21–3. Drive: 11 plays, 78 yards, 5:08.

Third quarter

- SAV – Jimmy Tran 36-yard field goal, 7:02. Bulldogs 21–6. Drive: 5 plays, 19 yards, 0:42.
- SCST – Tyler Jones 23-yard blocked punt return (Nico Cavanillas Alti kick), 3:41. Bulldogs 28–6.
- SCST – Jalen Johnson 10-yard pass from William Atkins IV (Nico Cavanillas Alti kick), 2:29. Bulldogs 35–6. Drive: 6 plays, 59 yards, 2:29.

Fourth quarter

- SCST – Darius Thompson 22-yard pass from William Atkins IV (Nico Cavanillas Alti kick), 11:37. Bulldogs 42–6. Drive: 3 plays, 42 yards, 1:09.
- SCST – Darius Thompson 62-yard pass from William Atkins IV (Cedric Oglesby kick), 1:50. Bulldogs 49–6. Drive: 6 plays, 76 yards, 2:37.

Statistics	SAV	SCST
First downs	12	21
Total yards	198	414
Rushing yards	33	46
Passing yards	165	368
Passing: Comp–Att–Int	14–38–2	23–41–0
Time of possession	35:10	24:50

Team	Category	Player	Statistics
Savannah State	Passing	Christian Burks	11/21, 116 yards, INT
Savannah State	Rushing	Joseph Hampton	5 carries, 20 yards
Savannah State	Receiving	Cinsere Clark	4 receptions, 64 yards
South Carolina State	Passing	Ryan Stubblefield	14/30, 206 yards, 2 TD
South Carolina State	Rushing	Mason Pickett-Hicks	5 carries, 28 yards
South Carolina State	Receiving	Jordan Smith	5 receptions, 86 yards

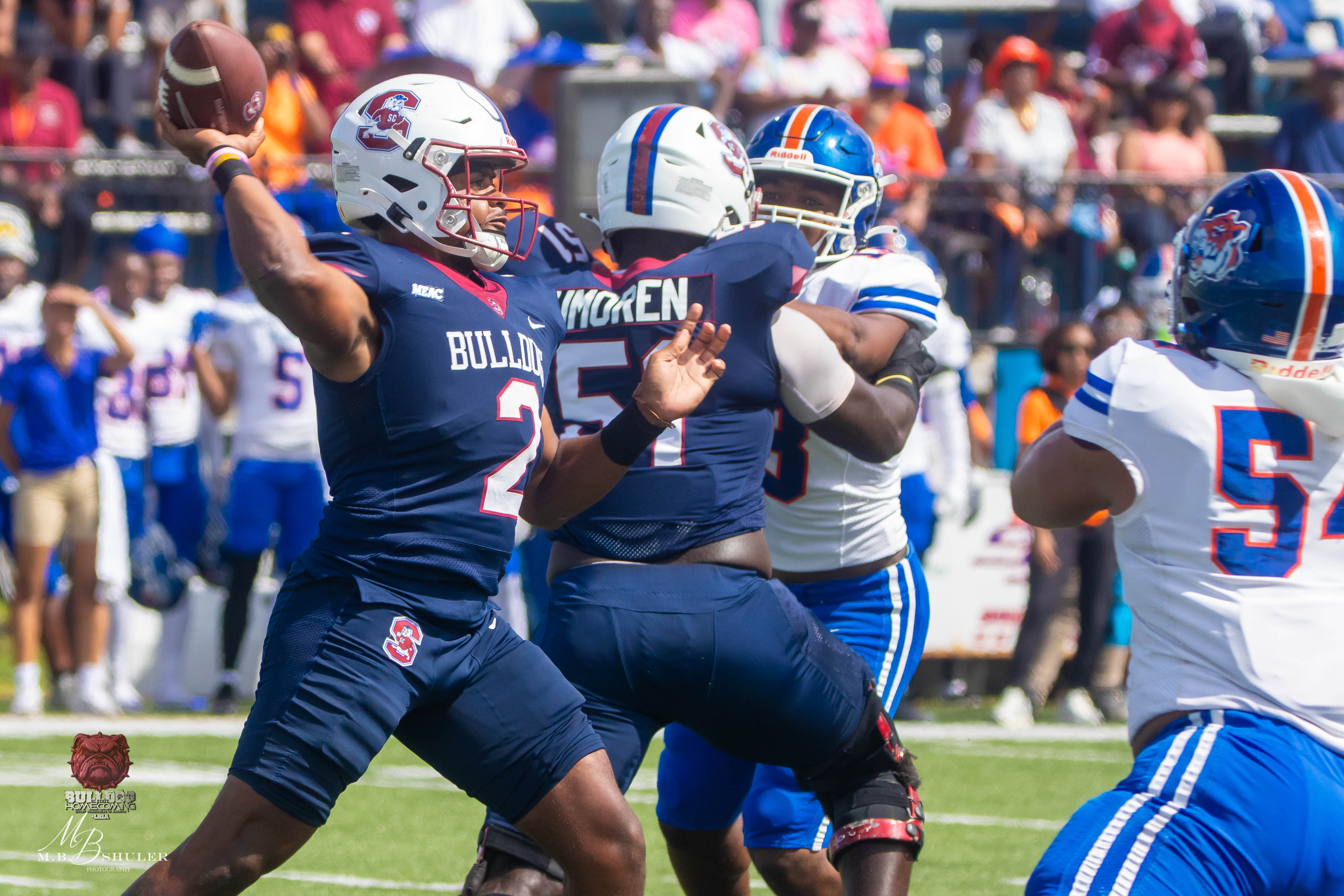
SSU vs SCSU 2025

=== at North Carolina A&T (rivalry) ===
South Carolina State Bulldogs (3–3) at North Carolina A&T Aggies (1–5) – Game summary

Quarter	1	2	3	4	Total
Bulldogs	0	0	7	15	22
Aggies	0	9	0	7	16

at Truist Stadium • Greensboro, North Carolina

- Date: October 11
- Game time: 1:00 p.m. EDT
- Game weather: Sunny, 62 °F (17 °C)
- Game attendance: 21,500
- Referee: Tony Jomes
- TV: FloSports

Game information
First quarter
- No scoring plays

Second quarter

- NCAT – Andrew Brown 43-yard field goal, 12:20. Aggies 3–0. Drive: 13 plays, 69 yards, 6:09.
- NCAT – Andrew Brown 55-yard field goal, 3:33. Aggies 6–0. Drive: 7 plays, 18 yards, 3:50.
- NCAT – Andrew Brown 33-yard field goal, 0:00. Aggies 9–0. Drive: 9 plays, 45 yards, 2:10.

Third quarter

- SCST – Cyrus Ellison 43-yard pass from William Atkins IV (Nico Cavanillas Alti kick), 6:42. Aggies 9–7. Drive: 8 plays, 86 yards, 3:29.

Fourth quarter

- SCST – Josh Shaw 1-yard run (William Atkins IV pass to Cyrus Ellison), 11:49. Bulldogs 15–9. Drive: 3 plays, 9 yards, 1:38.
- SCST – Jordan Smith 23-yard pass from William Atkins IV (Nico Cavanillas Alti kick), 9:27. Bulldogs 22–9. Drive: 5 plays, 33 yards, 2:13.
- NCAT – Thomas Brown 11-yard pass from Kevin White (Andrew Brown kick), 3:05. Bulldogs 22–16. Drive: 5 plays, 55 yards, 1:05.

Statistics	SCST	NCAT
First downs	17	20
Total yards	294	241
Rushing yards	129	47
Passing yards	165	194
Passing: Comp–Att–Int	15–31–1	17–34–1
Time of possession	27:55	32:05

Team	Category	Player	Statistics
South Carolina State	Passing	William Atkins IV	10/21, 101 yards, 2 TD
South Carolina State	Rushing	Mason Pickett-Hicks	15 carries, 67 yards
South Carolina State	Receiving	Cyrus Ellison	4 receptions, 54 yards, TD
North Carolina A&T	Passing	Kevin White	17/34, 194 yards, TD, INT
North Carolina A&T	Rushing	Wesley Graves	15 carries, 66 yards
North Carolina A&T	Receiving	Jamison Warren	5 receptions, 57 yards

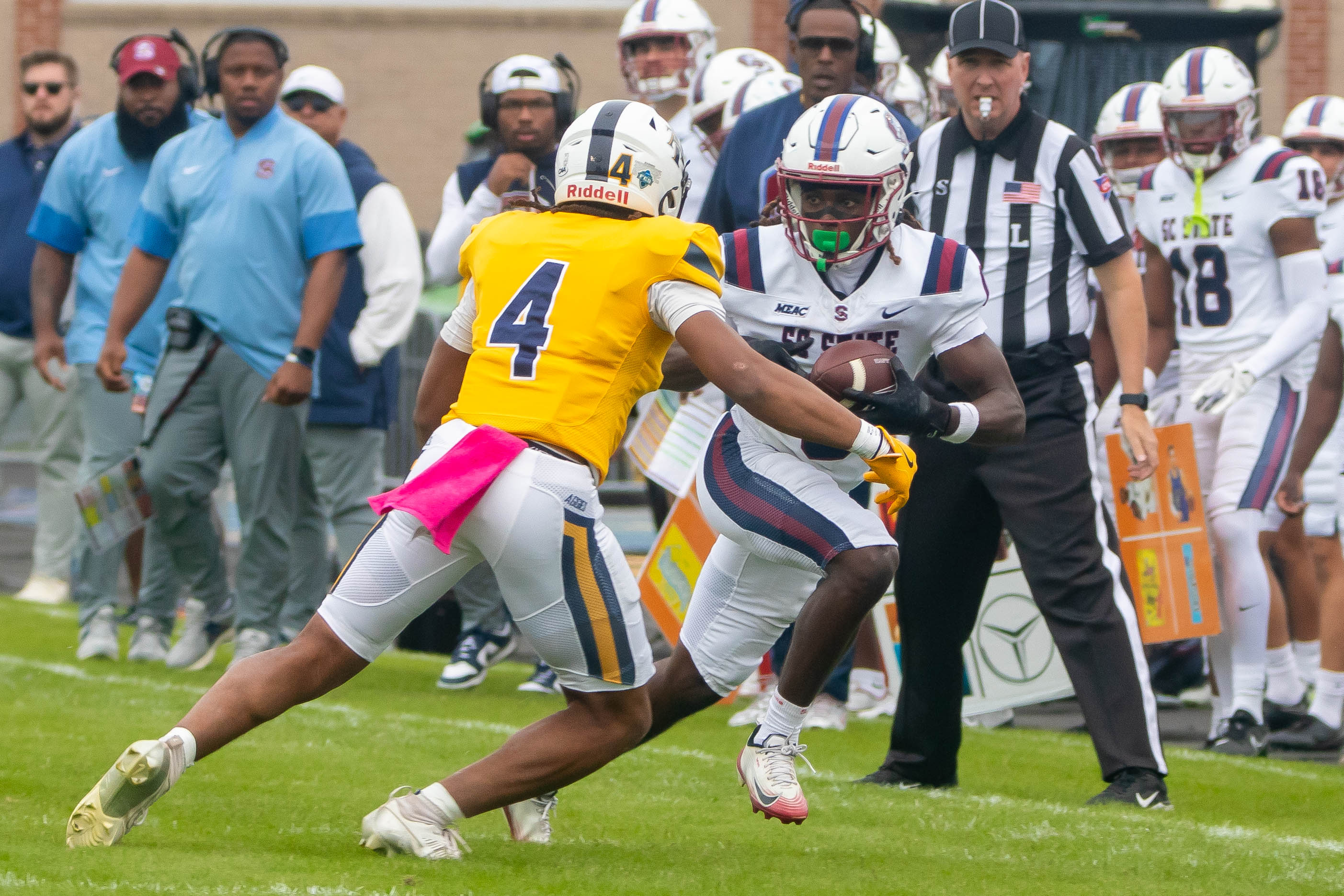
SCSU vs NCAT 2025

=== at Norfolk State ===
South Carolina State Bulldogs (4–3) at Norfolk State Spartans (1–6) – Game summary

Quarter	1	2	3	4	Total
Bulldogs	3	35	6	7	51
Spartans	7	7	0	6	20

at William "Dick" Price Stadium • Norfolk, Virginia

- Date: October 25
- Game time: 2:00 p.m. EDT
- Game weather: Sunny, 60 °F (16 °C)
- Game attendance: 47,273
- Referee: Javarro Edwards
- TV announcers (ESPN+): Ross Gordon (play-by-play), Don Carey (analyst) and Kendall Lanier (sideline)

Game information

First quarter

- (4:35) NORF – JJ Evans 22-yard pass from Otto Kuhns, Marco Peery kick (Drive: 5 plays, 44 yards, 2:12; Norfolk State 7-0)
- (1:12) SCST – Nico Cavanillas Alti 36-yard field goal (Drive: 7 plays, 34 yards, 3:16; Norfolk State 7-3)

Second quarter

- (11:42) SCST – Mason Pickett-Hicks 3-yard run, Nico Cavanillas Alti kick (Drive: 8 plays, 73 yards, 3:06; South Carolina State 10-7)
- (8:08) SCST – Nigel Johnson 15-yard pass from William Atkins IV, Nico Cavanillas Alti kick (Drive: 4 plays, 52 yards, 2:00; South Carolina State 17-7)
- (4:54) SCST – Jordan Smith 75-yard pass from William Atkins IV, Nico Cavanillas Alti kick (Drive: 3 plays, 80 yards, 1:04; South Carolina State 24-7)
- (1:07) SCST – Jordan Smith 36-yard pass from William Atkins IV, Nico Cavanillas Alti kick (Drive: 5 plays, 53 yards, 1:59; South Carolina State 31-7)
- (0:41) NORF – X'Zavion Evans 66-yard pass from Otto Kuhns, Marco Peery kick (Drive: 2 plays, 81 yards, 0:21; South Carolina State 31-14)
- (0:07) SCST – Mason Pickett-Hicks 8-yard pass from William Atkins IV, Nico Cavanillas Alti kick (Drive: 5 plays, 63 yards, 0:34; South Carolina State 38-14)

Third quarter

- (10:51) SCST – Nico Cavanillas Alti 26-yard field goal (Drive: 6 plays, 10 yards, 2:16; South Carolina State 41-14)
- (4:55) SCST – Nico Cavanillas Alti 31-yard field goal (Drive: 8 plays, 51 yards, 4:08; South Carolina State 44-14)

Fourth quarter

- (13:35) SCST – Tyler Smith 1-yard run, Nico Cavanillas Alti kick (Drive: 7 plays, 68 yards, 2:23; South Carolina State 51-14)
- (12:44) NORF – JJ Evans 48-yard pass from Otto Kuhns, Evan Helfrich PAT failed (Drive: 4 plays, 75 yards, 0:51; South Carolina State 51-20)

Statistics	SCST	NORF
First downs	30	13
Total yards	613	291
Rushing yards	185	61
Passing yards	428	230
Passing: Comp–Att–Int	24–36–1	10–20–1
Time of possession	37:52	22:08

Team	Category	Player	Statistics
South Carolina State	Passing	William Atkins IV	24/36, 428 yards, 4 TD, INT
South Carolina State	Rushing	Tyler Smith	19 carries, 113 yards, TD
South Carolina State	Receiving	Jordan Smith	7 receptions, 197 yards, 2 TD
Norfolk State	Passing	Otto Kuhns	10/18, 230 yards, 3 TD, INT
Norfolk State	Rushing	X'Zavion Evans	11 carries, 48 yards
Norfolk State	Receiving	J. J. Evans	4 receptions, 85 yards, 2 TD

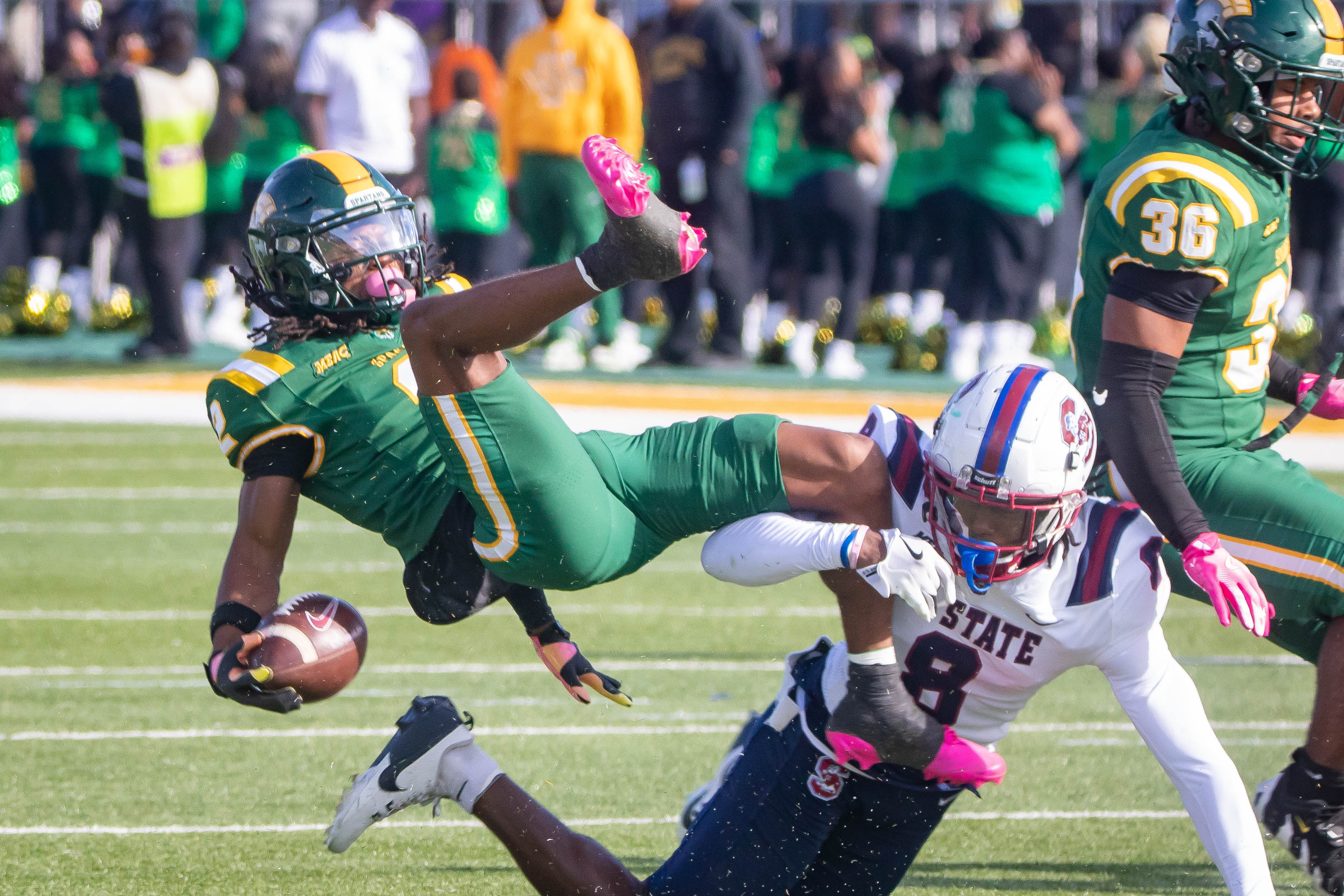
SCSU vs NSU 2025

=== Morgan State ===
Morgan State Bears (3–4) at South Carolina State Bulldogs (5–3) – Game summary

Quarter	1	2	3	4	Total
Bears	0	10	0	20	30
Bulldogs	7	21	5	3	36

at Oliver C. Dawson Stadium • Orangeburg, South Carolina

- Date: November 1
- Game time: 2:00 p.m. EDT
- Game weather: Sunny, 65 °F (18 °C)
- Game attendance: 14,061
- Referee: Toby Johnson
- TV: ESPN+

Game information

First quarter

- SCST – Tyler Smith 4-yard run (Nico Cavanillas Alti kick), 11:43. Bulldogs 7–0. Drive: 2 plays, 64 yards, 0:39.

Second quarter

- MORG – Alex Amaya 28-yard field goal, 14:57. Bulldogs 7–3. Drive: 5 plays, 29 yards, 2:36.
- SCST – Tyler Smith 1-yard run (Nico Cavanillas Alti kick), 9:30. Bulldogs 14–3. Drive: 5 plays, 74 yards, 2:02.
- MORG – Justin Perry 38-yard pass from Raymond Moore III (Alex Amaya kick), 8:38. Bulldogs 14–10. Drive: 3 plays, 48 yards, 0:44.
- SCST – Darius Thompson 69-yard pass from William Atkins IV (Nico Cavanillas Alti kick), 3:03. Bulldogs 21–10. Drive: 4 plays, 80 yards, 1:52.
- SCST – William Atkins IV 3-yard run (Nico Cavanillas Alti kick), 0:04. Bulldogs 28–10. Drive: 11 plays, 67 yards, 1:53.

Third quarter

- SCST – Nico Cavanillas Alti 23-yard field goal, 10:15. Bulldogs 31–10. Drive: 10 plays, 69 yards, 4:32.
- SCST – Kwantre Harry Safety, 1:12. Bulldogs 33—10.

Fourth quarter

- SCST – Nico Cavanillas Alti 36-yard field goal, 12:58. Bulldogs 36–10. Drive: 8 plays, 39 yards, 3:08.
- MORG – Dorian Harris 14-yard pass from Raymond Moore III (Alex Amaya kick), 8:29. Bulldogs 36–17. Drive: 7 plays, 70 yards, 4:21.
- MORG – Joseph Kennerly Jr. 25-yard pass from Raymond Moore III (pass failed), 2:03. Bulldogs 36–23. Drive: 7 plays, 55 yards, 2:08.
- MORG – Raymond Moore III 4-yard run (Alex Amaya kick), 1:08. Bulldogs 36–30. Drive: 7 plays, 51 yards, 0:52.

Statistics	MORG	SCST
First downs	18	21
Total yards	394	496
Rushing yards	165	133
Passing yards	229	363
Passing: Comp–Att–Int	17–30–2	21–32–1
Time of possession	30:27	29:33

Team	Category	Player	Statistics
Morgan State	Passing	Raymond Moore III	17/30, 229 yards, 3 TD, 2 INT
Morgan State	Rushing	Randall Nauden	12 carries, 81 yards
Morgan State	Receiving	Justin Perry	4 receptions, 77 yards, TD
South Carolina State	Passing	William Atkins IV	21/32, 363 yards, TD, INT
South Carolina State	Rushing	Tyler Smith	18 carries, 110 yards, 2 TD
South Carolina State	Receiving	Jordan Smith	4 receptions, 107 yards

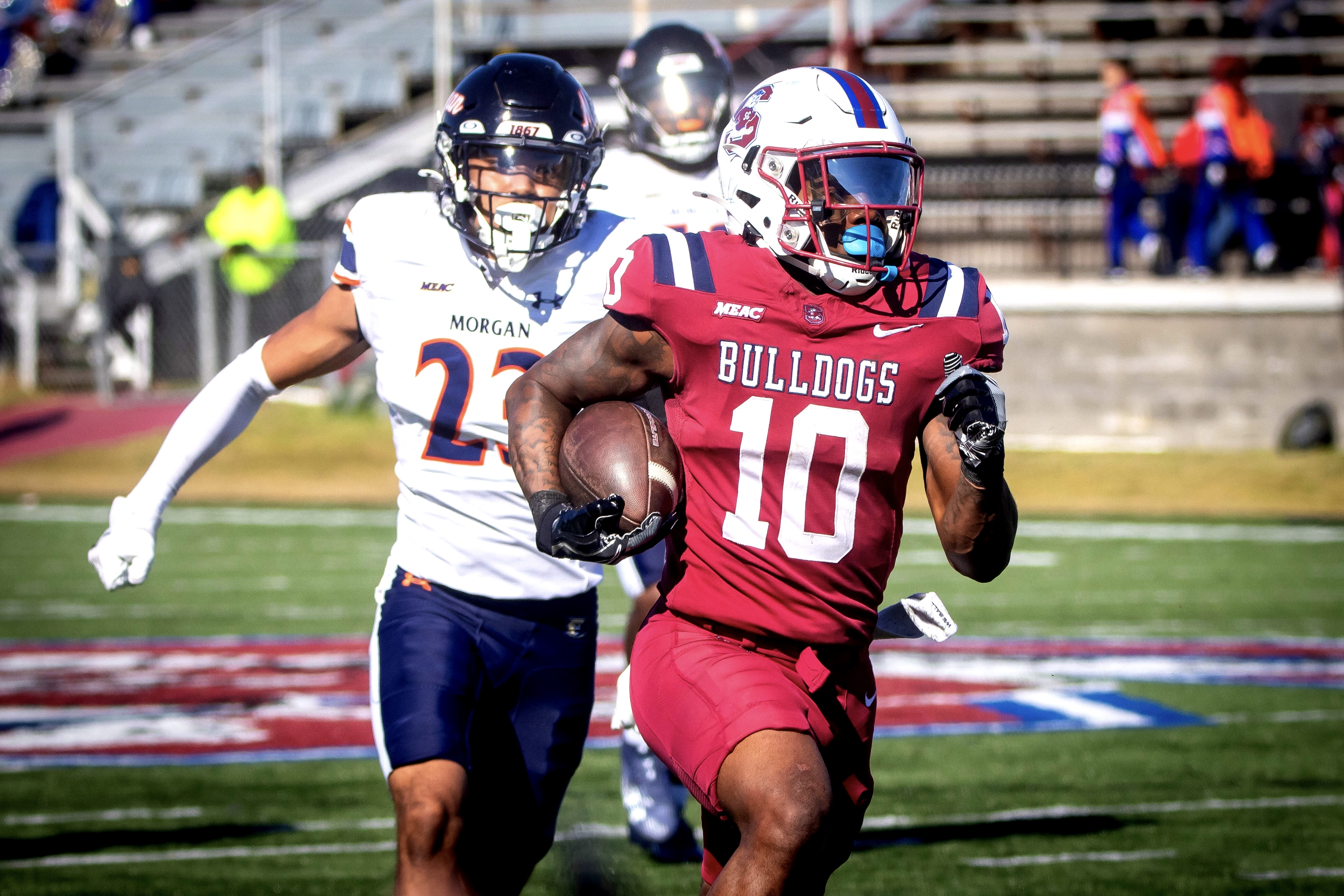
MSU vs SCSU 2025

=== Howard ===
Howard Bison (4–5) at South Carolina State Bulldogs (6–3) – Game summary

Quarter	1	2	3	4	Total
Bison	0	3	0	9	12
Bulldogs	21	7	14	0	42

at Oliver C. Dawson Stadium • Orangeburg, South Carolina

- Date: November 8
- Game time: 1:30 p.m. EST
- Game weather: Sunny, 75 °F (24 °C)
- Game attendance: 9,892
- Referee: David Cardell
- TV: ESPN+

Game information

First quarter

- SCST – Josh Shaw 1-yard run (Nico Cavanillas Alti kick), 10:15. Bulldogs 7–0. Drive: 6 plays, 60 yards, 2:57.
- SCST – Jarod Washington 27-yard interception return (Nico Cavanillas Alti kick), 9:23. Bulldogs 14–0.
- SCST – Jordan Smith 43-yard pass from William Atkins IV (Nico Cavanillas Alti kick), 1:45. Bulldogs 21–0. Drive: 7 plays, 72 yards, 3:26.

Second quarter

- HOW – Matt Conord 38-yard field goal, 14:16. Bulldogs 21–3. Drive: 5 plays, 26 yards, 2:21.
- SCST – Jarod Washington 56-yard blocked field goal return (Nico Cavanillas Alti kick), 0:04. Bulldogs 28–3.

Third quarter

- SCST – Jalen Johnson 34-yard pass from William Atkins IV (Nico Cavanillas Alti kick), 9:29. Bulldogs 35–3. Drive: 3 plays, 50 yards, 1:02.
- SCST – Jordan Smith 6-yard run (Nico Cavanillas Alti kick), 4:44. Bulldogs 42–3. Drive: 6 plays, 55 yards, 3:23.

Fourth quarter

- HOW – Team Safety, 5:03. Bulldogs 42–5.
- HOW – Eric Slater 48-yard pass from Terrell Russell (Matt Conord kick), 4:04. Bulldogs 42–12. Drive: 2 plays, 49 yards, 0:49.

Statistics	HOW	SCST
First downs	13	17
Total yards	209	337
Rushing yards	63	116
Passing yards	146	221
Passing: Comp–Att–Int	9–30–1	16–26–2
Time of possession	30:44	29:16

Team	Category	Player	Statistics
Howard	Passing	Tyriq Starks	7/22, 97 yards, INT
Howard	Rushing	Anthony Reagan Jr.	12 carries, 34 yards
Howard	Receiving	Eric Slater	1 reception, 48 yards, TD
South Carolina State	Passing	William Atkins IV	15/23, 213 yards, TD, INT
South Carolina State	Rushing	Josh Shaw	9 carries, 64 yards, TD
South Carolina State	Receiving	Jalen Johnson	6 receptions, 87 yards, TD

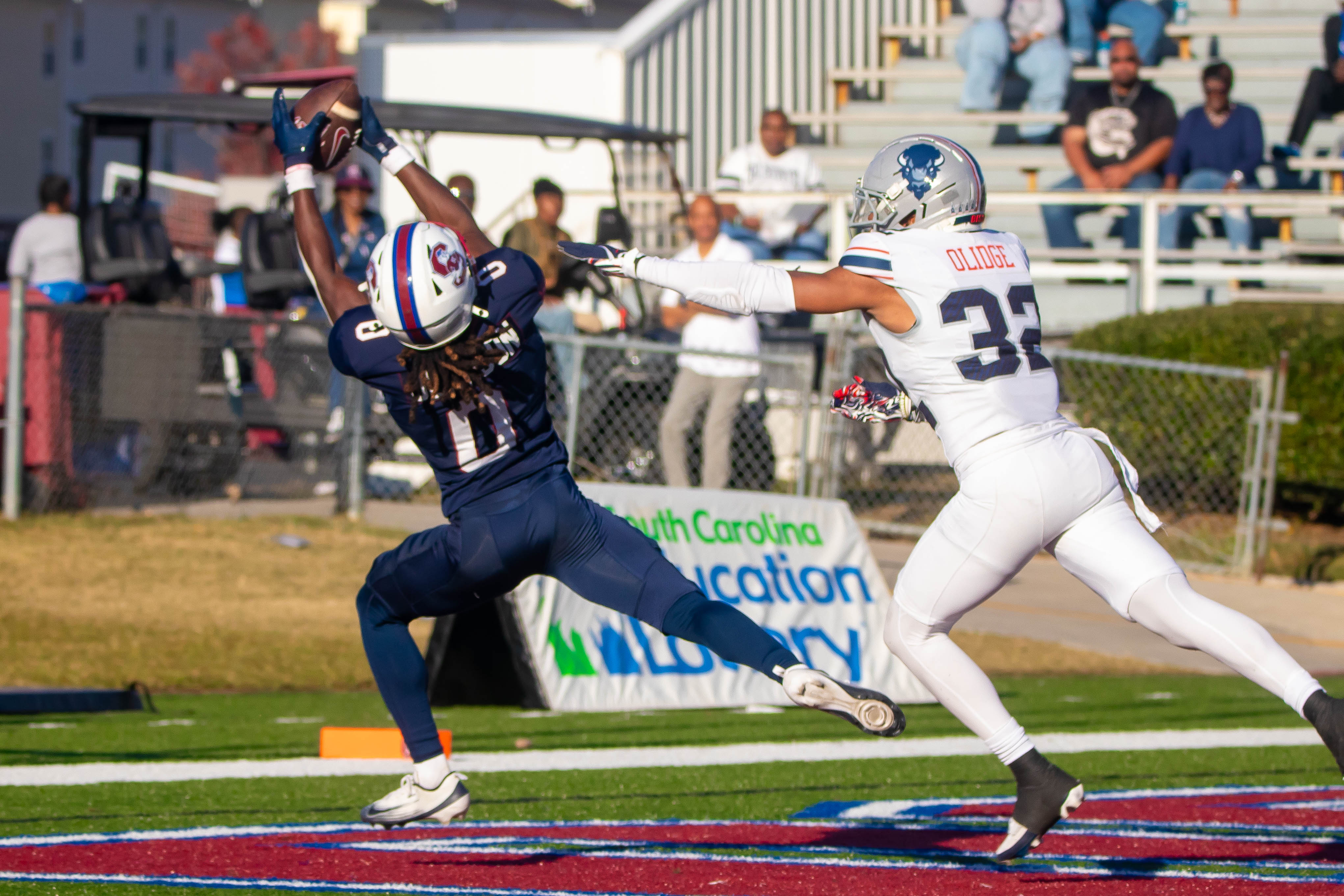
HU vs SCSU 2025

=== At North Carolina Central ===
South Carolina State Bulldogs (7–3) at North Carolina Central Eagles (7–3) – Game summary

Quarter	1	2	3	4	Total
Bulldogs	17	0	3	14	34
Eagles	3	17	7	0	27

at O'Kelly–Riddick Stadium • Durham, North Carolina

- Date: November 14
- Game time: 5:30 p.m. EST
- Game weather: Sunny
- Game attendance: 7,291
- Referee: Jason Soistman
- TV announcers (ESPN2): Tiffany Greene (play-by-play) and Jay Walker (analyst)

Game information

First quarter

- (6:34) SCST – Nico Cavanillas Alti 50-yard field goal (Drive: 10 plays, 27 yards, 5:07; South Carolina State 3–0)
- (4:36) NCCU – Kaleb Robison 41-yard field goal (Drive: 6 plays, 51 yards, 1:58; Tied 3–3)
- (0:10) SCST – Deyandre Ruffin 28-yard pass from William Atkins IV, Nico Cavanillas Alti kick (Drive: 9 plays, 75 yards, 4:26; South Carolina State 10–3)
- (0:00) SCST – Nigel Johnson 51-yard pass from William Atkins IV, Nico Cavanillas Alti kick (Drive: 1 play, 51 yards, 0:06; South Carolina State 17–3)

Second quarter

- (10:44) NCCU – Kaleb Robison 31-yard field goal (Drive: 10 plays, 53 yards, 4:08; South Carolina State 17–6)
- (9:53) NCCU – Eric Adams 33-yard interception, Kaleb Robison kick (South Carolina State 17–13)
- (2:58) NCCU – Chris Mosley 9-yard run, Kaleb Robison kick (Drive: 10 plays, 98 yards, 4:37; North Carolina Central 20–17)

Third quarter

- (11:39) SCST – Nico Cavanillas Alti 28-yard field goal (Drive: 7 plays, 35 yards, 3:13; Tied 20–20)
- (8:33) NCCU – Mehki Wall 35-yard pass from Walker Harris, Kaleb Robison kick (Drive: 7 plays, 66 yards, 3:00; North Carolina Central 27–20)

Fourth quarter

- (13:25) SCST – Jordan Smith 24-yard pass from William Atkins IV, Nico Cavanillas Alti kick (Drive: 13 plays, 80 yards, 5:24; Tied 27–27)
- (1:51) SCST – Josh Shaw 30-yard run, Nico Cavanillas Alti kick (Drive: 6 plays, 52 yards, 3:16; South Carolina State 34–27)

Statistics	SCST	NCCU
First downs	24	17
Total yards	454	306
Rushing yards	140	88
Passing yards	314	218
Passing: Comp–Att–Int	24–36–1	13–31–0
Time of possession	36:29	23:31

Team	Category	Player	Statistics
South Carolina State	Passing	William Atkins IV	24/36, 314 yards, 3 TD, INT
South Carolina State	Rushing	Josh Shaw	10 carries, 83 yards, TD
South Carolina State	Receiving	Jordan Smith	7 receptions, 72 yards, TD
North Carolina Central	Passing	Walker Harris	13/31, 218 yards, TD
North Carolina Central	Rushing	Chris Mosley	21 carries, 105 yards, TD
North Carolina Central	Receiving	Mehki Wall	5 receptions, 88 yards, TD

=== At Delaware State ===
South Carolina State Bulldogs (8–3) at Delaware State Hornets (8–3) – Game summary

Quarter	1	2	3	4	Total
Bulldogs	7	7	7	7	28
Hornets	3	0	7	7	17

at Alumni Stadium • Dover, Delaware

- Date: November 22
- Game time: 1:00 p.m. EST
- Game weather: Cloudy, 53 °F (12 °C)
- Game attendance: 4,077
- Referee: Jason Soistman
- TV: ESPN+

Game information
First quarter
- SCST – Jalen Levine 33-yard interception return (Nico Cavanillas Alti kick), 9:29. Bulldogs 7–0.
- DSU – Thomas Monnig 42-yard field goal, 3:05. Bulldogs 7–3. Drive: 8 plays, 45 yards, 3:36.

Second quarter

- SCST – Jordan Smith 10-yard pass from William Atkins IV (Nico Cavanillas Alti kick), 1:10. Bulldogs 14–3. Drive: 8 plays, 79 yards, 3:47.

Third quarter

- DSU – Marquis Gillis 68-yard run (Patrick Fisher-Butler kick), 10:15. Bulldogs 14–10. Drive: 5 plays, 99 yards, 2:29.
- SCST – Johnny Jones 52-yard pass from William Atkins IV (Nico Cavanillas Alti kick), 3:54. Bulldogs 21–10. Drive: 2 plays, 60 yards, 0:40.

Fourth quarter

- DSU – James Jones 10-yard run (Patrick Fisher-Butler kick), 10:56. Bulldogs 21–17. Drive: 5 plays, 51 yards, 1:37.
- SCST – Ryan Stubblefield 5-yard run (Nico Cavanillas Alti kick), 5:11. Bulldogs 28–17. Drive: 11 plays, 75 yards, 5:45.

Statistics	SCST	DSU
First downs	16	22
Total yards	406	526
Rushing yards	157	439
Passing yards	249	87
Passing: Comp–Att–Int	14–24–0	15–33–4
Time of possession	28:40	31:20

Team	Category	Player	Statistics
South Carolina State	Passing	William Atkins IV	14/24, 249 yards, 2 TD
South Carolina State	Rushing	Josh Shaw	16 carries, 99 yards
South Carolina State	Receiving	Nigel Johnson	2 receptions, 74 yards
Delaware State	Passing	Kaiden Bennett	8/20, 59 yards, 2 INT
Delaware State	Rushing	Marquis Gillis	14 carries, 159 yards, TD
Delaware State	Receiving	Kyree Benton	3 receptions, 37 yards

=== Vs. Prairie View A&M (Celebration Bowl) ===
2025 Cricket Celebration Bowl
South Carolina State Bulldogs (9–3) vs. Prairie View A&M Panthers (10–3) – Game summary

Quarter	1	2	3	4	OT	2OT	3OT	4OT	Total
Bulldogs	0	0	21	14	3	0	0	2	40
Panthers	7	14	7	7	3	0	0	0	38

at Mercedes-Benz Stadium, Atlanta, Georgia

- Date: December 13
- Game time: 12:00 p.m. EST
- Game weather: Sunny (retractable roof open)
- Game attendance: 26,703
- Referee: Scott Broadway
- TV announcers (ABC): Tiffany Greene, Jay Walker, Harry Lyles Jr., and Quint Kessenich
- Box score, Recap

Game information
First quarter
- PV – Ethan John 16-yard pass from Cameron Peters (Diego Alfaro kick), 1:02. Panthers 7–0. Drive: 6 plays, 69 yards, 2:17.

Second quarter

- PV – Cameron Peters 27-yard run (Diego Alfaro kick), 10:30. Panthers 14–0. Drive: 5 plays, 85 yards, 1:53.
- PV – Jyzaiah Rockwell 14-yard pass from Cameron Peters (Diego Alfaro kick), 1:05. Panthers 21–0. Drive: 11 plays, 95 yards, 4:32.

Third quarter

- SCST – Tyler Smith 5-yard run (Nico Cavanillas Alti kick), 11:19. Panthers 21–7. Drive: 1 play, 5 yards, 0:06.
- SCST – Jordan Smith 10-yard run (Nico Cavanillas Alti kick), 8:34. Panthers 21–14. Drive: 2 plays, 52 yards, 0:43.
- SCST – Jordan Smith 19-yard pass from Ryan Stubblefield (Nico Cavanillas Alti kick), 5:05. Tied 21–21. Drive: 4 plays, 49 yards, 2:07.
- PV – Andre Dennis 13-yard pass from Cameron Peters (Diego Alfaro kick), 2:38. Panthers 28–21. Drive: 6 plays, 75 yards, 2:27.

Fourth quarter

- SCST – Ryan Subblefield (Nico Cavanillas Alti kick), 10:44. Tied 28–28. Drive: 12 plays, 75 yards, 6:54.
- PV – Cameron Bonner 78-yard pass from Cameron Peters (Diego Alfaro kick), 9:53. Panthers 35–28. Drive: 2 plays, 75 yards, 0:51.
- SCST – Jordan Smith 10-yard pass from Ryan Subblefield (Nico Cavanillas Alti kick), 1:54. Tied 35–35. Drive: 13 plays, 62 yards, 5:14.

Overtime

- PV – Diego Alfaro 29-yard field goal. Panthers 38–35. Drive: 4 plays, 6 yards.
- SCST – Nico Cavanillas Alti 40-yard field goal. Tied 38–38. Drive: 4 plays, -5 yards.

2nd overtime

- No scoring plays

3rd overtime

- No scoring plays

4th overtime

- SCST – Ryan Subblefield two-point pass to Tyler Smith. Bulldogs 40–38.

Statistics	SCST	PV
First downs	22	21
Total yards	357	491
Rushing yards	78	55
Passing yards	279	436
Passing: Comp–Att–Int	22–39–1	25–37–0
Time of possession	34:15	25:45

Team	Category	Player	Statistics
South Carolina State	Passing	Ryan Stubblefield	15/29, 234 yards, 2 TD, INT
South Carolina State	Rushing	Jordan Smith	5 rushes, 28 yards, TD
South Carolina State	Receiving	Jordan Smith	9 receptions, 152 yards, 2 TD
Prairie View A&M	Passing	Cameron Peters	24/36, 412 yards, 4 TD
Prairie View A&M	Rushing	Cameron Peters	9 rushes, 35 yards, TD
Prairie View A&M	Receiving	Andre Dennis	7 receptions, 131 yards, TD

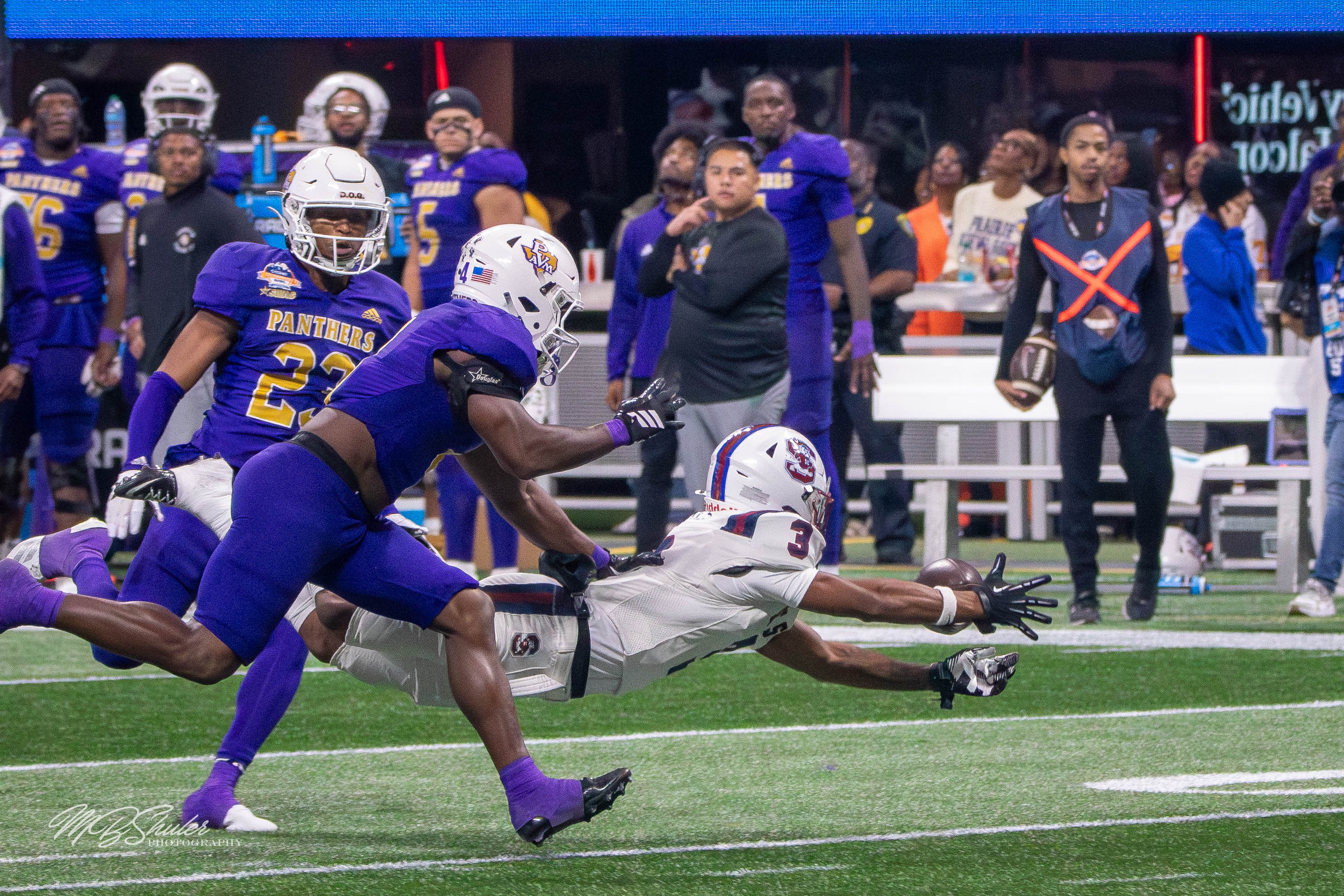
SCSU vs PVAM C2025
