= Wendell Avery =

American gridiron football player and coach (born 1956)

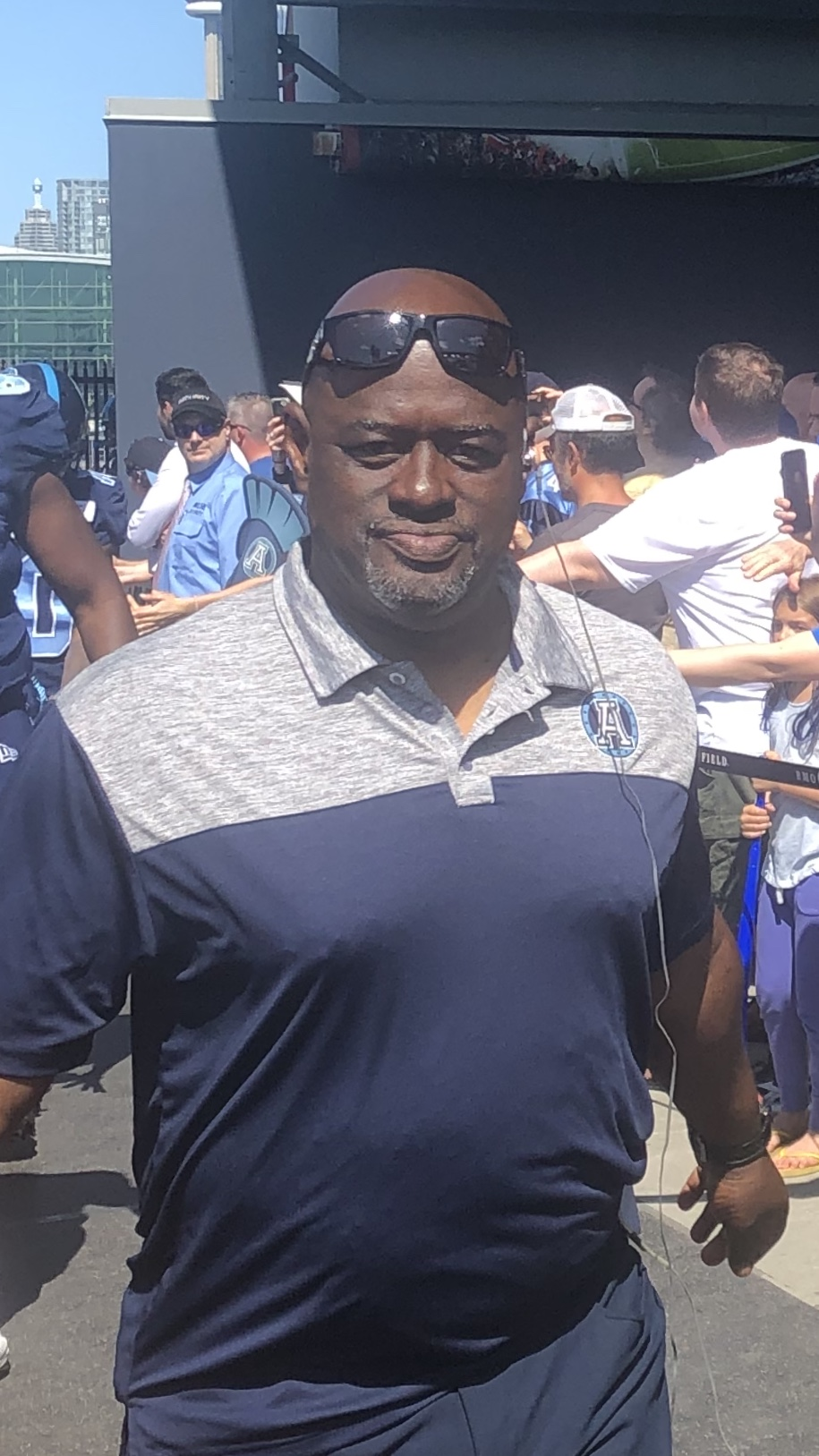
- Avery in 2019

Toronto Argonauts
- Title: Wide receivers coach

Personal information
- Born: October 20, 1956 (age 70); Corpus Christi, Texas, U.S.

Career information
- College: Minnesota (1977–1979)

Career history
- Macalester (1982–1983) Quarterbacks & wide receivers coach; Winona State (1990–1991) Offensive coordinator; Alabama A&M (1992–1993) Quarterbacks & wide receivers coach; Savannah State (1994) Offensive coordinator; Savannah State (1995–1996) Head coach; Fort Valley State (1998) Quarterbacks coach; Tampa Bay Buccaneers (1999–2000) Offensive assistant; Toronto Argonauts (2017–2018) Assistant special teams coordinator; Toronto Argonauts (2019–present) Wide receivers coach

Head coaching record
- Career: College: 13–9 (.591)

Wendell L. Avery (born October 20, 1956) is an American gridiron football coach and former player. He is the wide receivers coach for the Toronto Argonauts of the Canadian Football League (CFL). Avery served as the head football coach at Savannah State University (SSU) from 1995 to 1996, compiling a career college football record of 12–10.

== College career ==
Avery spent three years playing quarterback for the University of Minnesota, suiting up for 33 games, throwing for 1,194 yards, 7 touchdowns and 10 interceptions. His best season was in 1978 when he recorded a season-high 663 yards with three touchdowns and six picks.

== Head coaching record ==
Year	Team	Overall	Conference	Standing	Bowl/playoffs
Savannah State Tigers (Southern Intercollegiate Athletic Conference) (1995–1996)
1995	Savannah State	7–4	4–4	T–5th	
1996	Savannah State	6–5	3–3	T–2nd	
Savannah State:		13–9	7–7		
Total:		13–9			
