= Al Lavan =

American football player (1946–2018)

No. 49
- Position: Safety

Personal information
- Born: September 13, 1946; Fort Pierce, Florida, U.S.
- Died: April 23, 2018 (aged 71); Adams County, Colorado, U.S.
- Listed height: 6 ft 1 in (1.85 m)
- Listed weight: 202 lb (92 kg)

Career information
- High school: South Side (Newark, New Jersey); Union Academy (Bartow, Florida)
- College: Colorado State (1964-1967)
- NFL draft: 1968: 8th round, 204th overall pick

Career history

Playing
- Philadelphia Eagles (1968)*; Pottstown Firebirds (1968–1969); Atlanta Falcons (1969–1970)
- * Offseason or practice squad member only

Coaching
- Colorado St. (1972) Wide receivers / tight ends coach; Louisville (1973) Assistant coach; Iowa State (1974) Assistant coach; Atlanta Falcons (1975–1976) Defensive backs coach; Georgia Tech (1977) Wide receivers coach; Georgia Tech (1978) Running backs coach; Stanford (1979) Running backs coach; Dallas Cowboys (1980–1989) Running backs coach; San Francisco 49ers (1990) Running backs coach; Washington (1991-1995) Running backs coach; Baltimore Ravens (1996–1998) Running backs coach; Kansas City Chiefs (1999–2000) Running backs coach; Eastern Michigan (2001-2003) Running backs coach; Eastern Michigan (2003) Interim head coach; Delaware State (2004-2010) Head coach

Awards and highlights
- MEAC championship (2007)

Career NFL statistics
- Interceptions: 5
- Fumble recoveries: 3
- Stats at Pro Football Reference

Head coaching record
- Postseason: NCAA: 0–1 (.000)
- Career: 43–38 (.531)

Alton Lavan (September 13, 1946 – April 23, 2018) was an American football player and coach. He served as the head football coach at Delaware State University from 2004 to 2010. Lavan was also as the interim head football coach at Eastern Michigan University for the final three games of the 2003 season, after replacing Jeff Woodruff. He played college football at Colorado State University and professionally with the Atlanta Falcons of the National Football League (NFL).

Raised in Newark, New Jersey, Lavan played prep football at South Side High School, which has since been renamed Malcolm X Shabazz High School.

As a longtime running backs coach, he coached the following players throughout his various tenures: Tony Dorsett, Herschel Walker, Eddie Lee Ivery, Drew Hill, Bam Morris, Earnest Byner, Leroy Hoard, Priest Holmes, Napoleon Kaufman, Errict Rhett, Roosevelt Potts, Donnell Bennett, Tony Richardson, and Kimble Anders.

== Head coaching record ==
Year	Team	Overall	Conference	Standing	Bowl/playoffs	TSN^{#}	Coaches^{°}
Eastern Michigan Eagles (Mid-American Conference) (2003)
2003	Eastern Michigan	2–1	2–1	6th (West)			
Eastern Michigan:		2–1	2–1				
Delaware State Hornets (Mid-Eastern Athletic Conference) (2004–2010)
2004	Delaware State	4–7	4–3	T–3rd			
2005	Delaware State	7–4	6–2	3rd			
2006	Delaware State	8–3	6–2	T–2nd			
2007	Delaware State	10–2	9–0	1st	L NCAA Division I First Round	15	16
2008	Delaware State	5–6	5–3	T–2nd			
2009	Delaware State	4–7	3–4	6th			
2010	Delaware State	3–8	2–6	8th			
Delaware State:		41–37	35–20				
Total:		43–38					
National championship Conference title Conference division title or championship game berth
^{#}Rankings from final The Sports Network FCS Poll.; ^{°}Rankings from final FCS Coaches Poll.
