= Chadrick Cone =

American football player (born 1983)

Profile
- Position: Wide receiver

Personal information
- Born: August 10, 1983 (age 43); Waycross, Georgia, U.S.
- Listed height: 6 ft 2 in (1.88 m)
- Listed weight: 232 lb (105 kg)

Career information
- High school: Waycross (GA) Ware County
- College: Savannah State
- NFL draft: 2006: undrafted

Career history
- Georgia Force (2008)*
- * Offseason or practice squad member only

Awards and highlights
- First Team All-Region (Basketball); State Championship (Track)

Chadrick Cone (born August 10, 1983) is an American former football wide receiver.

== High school ==
Cone was a letterman in basketball and track at Ware County High School in Waycross, Georgia. In basketball, he was a first team All-Region selection. In track, he led his team to the State Championship as a senior.

== College career ==
Cone attended Paine College in Augusta, Georgia for one year with the intention of playing basketball, but ran track instead. Cone transferred to Savannah State University as a sophomore and joined the Tigers' football team as a running back. In his 27-game career with the Tigers he ran for 1,506 yards on 282 carries and eight touchdowns. He also had 36 receptions for 516 yards and two touchdowns.

In his first season with the Tigers he had nine carries for 50 yards and one reception (13 yards. As a junior, he ran for 862 rushing yards on 168 attempts (career highs) and scored six touchdowns. He had 19 receptions for 358 receiving yards. During his senior season, he had 105 rushing attempts for 594 yards and two touchdowns. He caught 16 passes for 145 yards and one touchdown.

== Professional career ==
Cone was signed to play wide receiver for the Arena Football League's Georgia Force on November 1, 2007. Cone was waived by the team on February 18, 2008.
