= Kenneth Pettiford =

American football player and coach (born 1950)

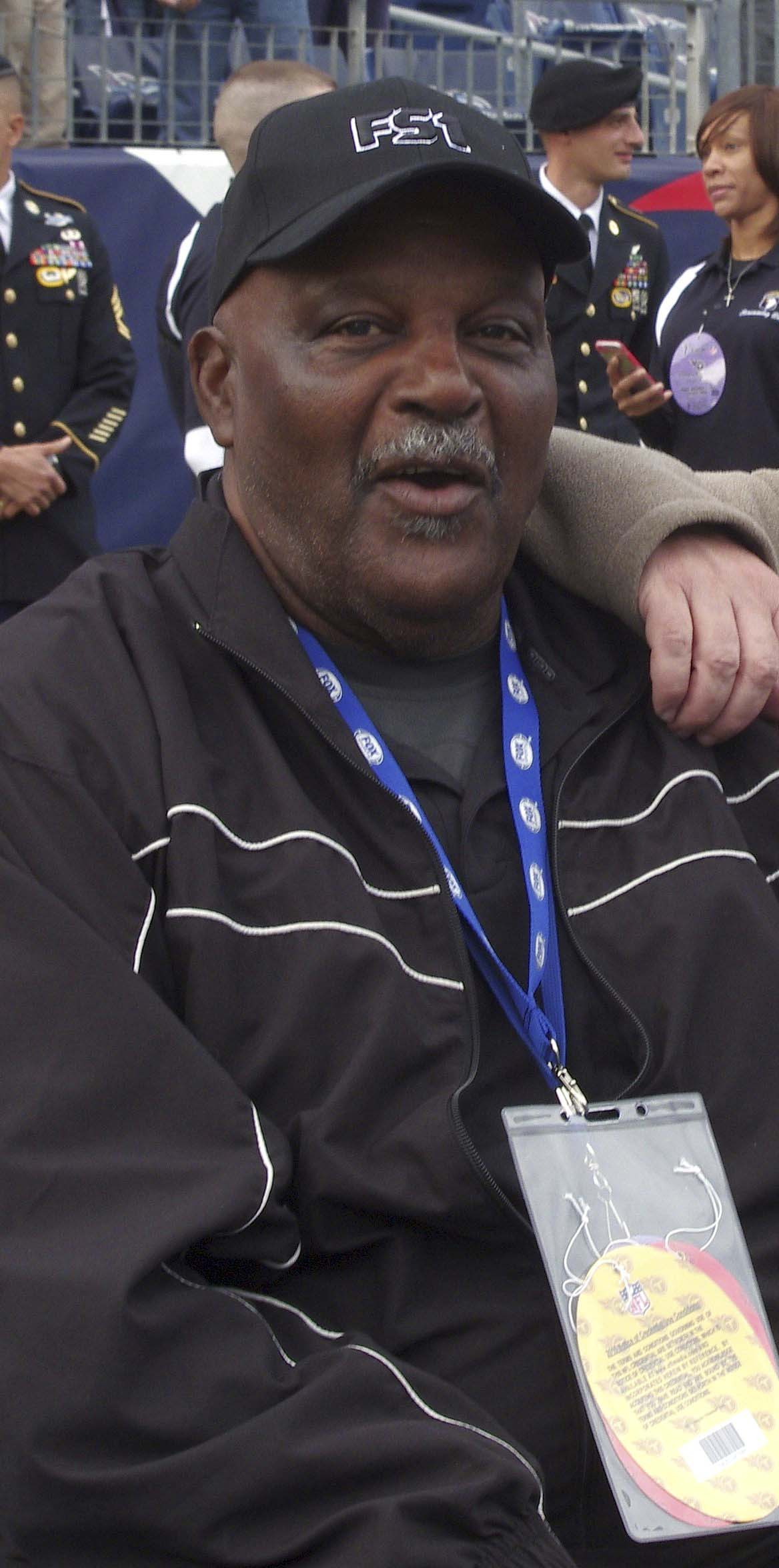
- Pettiford in Nashville, Tennessee, on November 15, 2015

Biographical details
- Born: July 9, 1950 (age 76); Nashville, Tennessee, U.S.

Playing career
- 1970–1973: Tennessee State
- Position: Quarterback

Coaching career (HC unless noted)
- 1984: Alcorn State (QB)
- 1986: Jackson State (assistant)
- 1987–1989: Mississippi Valley State
- 1991–1994: Albany State (OC)
- 1995–1997: Alabama A&M
- 2002–2003: Savannah State

Head coaching record
- Overall: 25–54

Kenneth Pettiford (born July 9, 1950) is a former American college football player and coach. He served as the head coach at Mississippi Valley State University (MVSU) from 1987 to 1989, Alabama Agricultural and Mechanical University (AAMU) from 1995 to 1997, and Savannah State University (SSU) from 2002 to 2003, compiling a career college football coaching record of 25–54. He currently works as a video production assistant at the Tennessee Titans games.

== Coaching career ==
=== Mississippi Valley State ===
Pettiford was the 11th head football coach at Mississippi Valley State University in Itta Bena, Mississippi and he held that position for three seasons, from 1987 until 1989. His coaching record at Mississippi Valley State was 5–2.

=== Alabama A&M ===
Pettiford served as head coach of the Bulldogs from 1995 to 1997 and compiled a 19–14 record.

=== Savannah State ===
Pettiford became the 19th head football coach for the Tigers in 2002. In Pettiford's first season as head coach, the Tigers compiled a 1–9 record. Pettiford was fired following the fifth game of the 2003 season with a 0–5 record.

== Head coaching record ==
Year	Team	Overall	Conference	Standing	Bowl/playoffs
Mississippi Valley State Delta Devils (Southwestern Athletic Conference) (1987–1989)
1987	Mississippi Valley State	1–10	0–7	8th	
1988	Mississippi Valley State	3–8	1–6	7th	
1989	Mississippi Valley State	1–9	0–7	8th	
Mississippi Valley State:		5–27	1–20		
Alabama A&M Bulldogs (Southern Intercollegiate Athletic Conference) (1995–1997)
1995	Alabama A&M	6–5	5–3	T–2nd	
1996	Alabama A&M	6–5	3–3	T–2nd	
1997	Alabama A&M	7–4	4–2	T–2nd	
Alabama A&M:		19–14	12–8		
Savannah State Tigers (NCAA Division I-AA independent) (2002–2003)
2002	Savannah State	1–8			
2003	Savannah State	0–5 (Note: Pettiford was fired after five games. Richard Basil served as head coach for the final seven games. Savannah State finished 0–12 on the season.)			
Savannah State:		1–13			
Total:		25–54			
