= Bobby Curtis (American football) =

American football player (born 1964)

No. 90, 61
- Position: Linebacker

Personal information
- Born: October 23, 1964 (age 62); Macon, Georgia, U.S.
- Listed height: 6 ft 5 in (1.96 m)
- Listed weight: 235 lb (107 kg)

Career information
- High school: Jones Co. (Gray, Georgia)
- College: Jackson State; The Citadel; Savannah State
- NFL draft: 1987: undrafted

Career history
- New York Jets (1987)*; Washington Redskins (1987); New York Jets (1988); Ohio Glory (1992)
- * Offseason or practice squad member only

Career NFL statistics
- Sacks: 1
- Fumble recoveries: 2
- Stats at Pro Football Reference

Robert Waymon Curtis (born October 23, 1964) is an American former professional football player who was a linebacker in the National Football League (NFL). He played three games for the Washington Redskins in 1987. He played college football for the Savannah State Tigers.
