= 2025 Celebration Bowl =

Postseason college football bowl game

2025 Cricket Celebration Bowl
- 10th Celebration Bowl
South Carolina State Bulldogs	Prairie View A&M Panthers
(9–3)	(10–3)
MEAC	SWAC
40	38
Head coach: Chennis Berry	Head coach: Tremaine Jackson
	1	2	3	4	OT	2OT	3OT	4OT	Total
South Carolina State	0	0	21	14	3	0	0	2	40
Prairie View A&M	7	14	7	7	3	0	0	0	38
- Date: December 13, 2025
- Season: 2025
- Stadium: Mercedes-Benz Stadium
- Location: Atlanta, Georgia
- MVP: Ryan Subblefield (QB, South Carolina State); Brenyen Scott (DB, South Carolina State)
- Referee: Scott Broadway (Sun Belt)
- Attendance: 26,703

United States TV coverage
- Network: ABC; ESPN Radio
- Announcers: Tiffany Greene (play-by-play), Jay Walker (analyst), Harry Lyles Jr. and Quint Kessenich (sideline reporters) (ABC); Jason Ross Jr. (play-by-play), Max Starks (analyst), and Jordan Reid (sideline reporter) (ESPN Radio)

The 2025 Celebration Bowl was a college football bowl game that was played on December 13, 2025, at Mercedes-Benz Stadium in Atlanta, Georgia. The tenth annual Celebration Bowl game featured the South Carolina State Bulldogs, champions of the Mid-Eastern Athletic Conference, and the Prairie View A&M Panthers, champions of the Southwestern Athletic Conference. South Carolina State beat Prairie View A&M in quadruple overtime by a score of 40–38.

The game began at noon EST and aired on ABC. The Celebration Bowl was the only one of the 2025–26 bowl games played by FCS teams. The game was sponsored by wireless service provider Cricket Wireless and was officially known as the Cricket Celebration Bowl.

== Teams ==
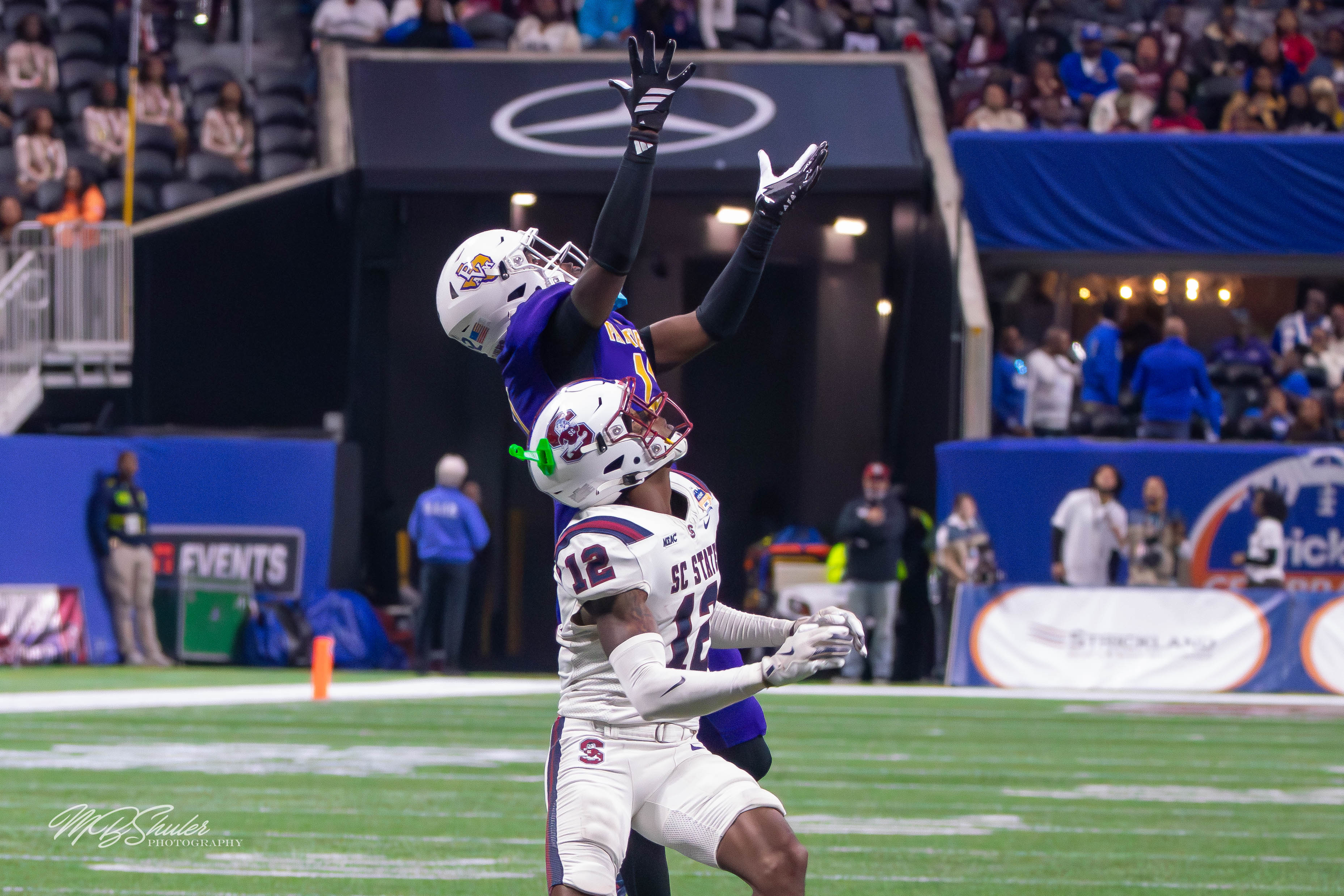
SCSU vs PVAMU 2025

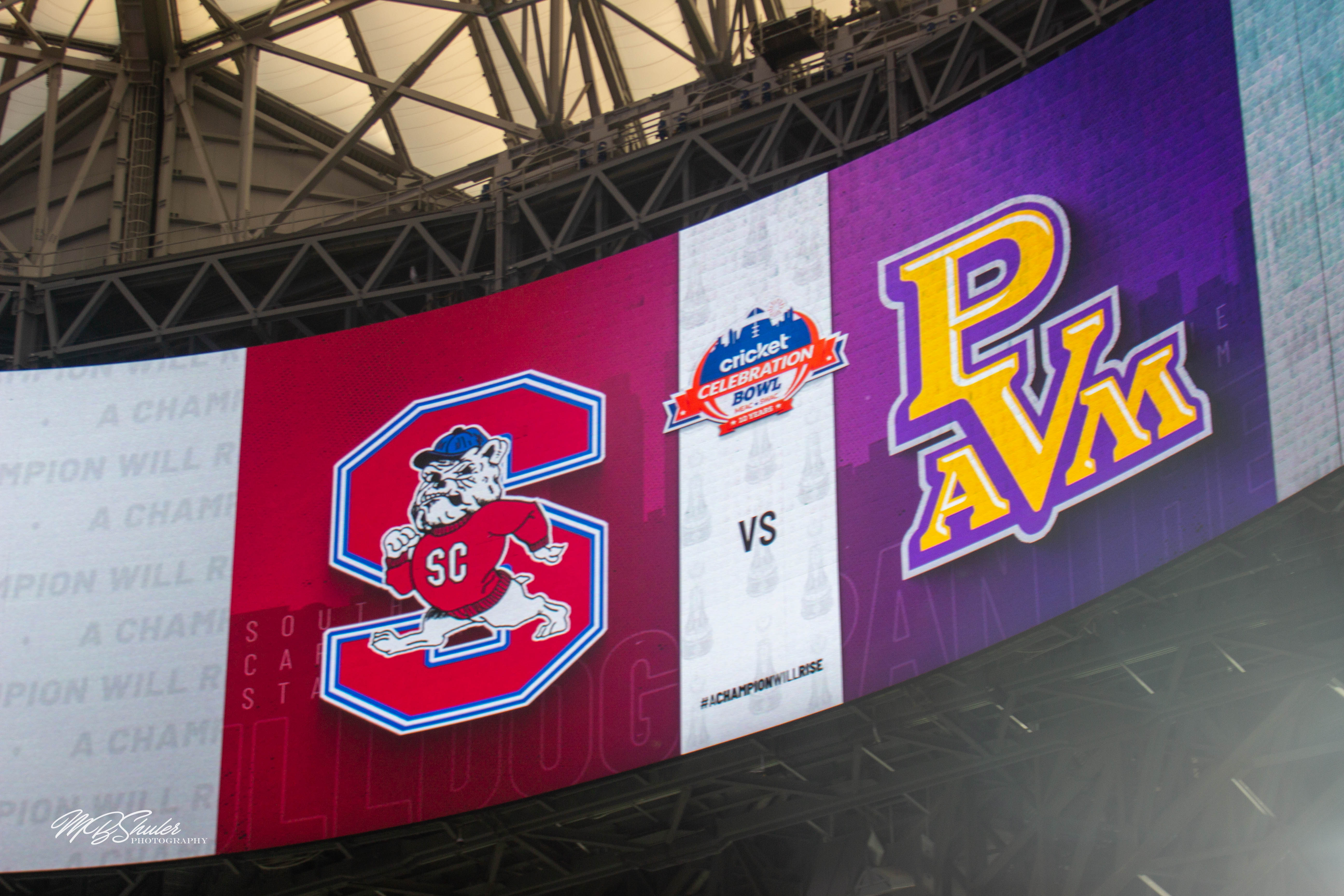
SCSU at PVAM 2025 Celebration Bowl

The SWAC and MEAC are the two NCAA Division I conferences of historically black colleges and universities (HBCUs). The Celebration Bowl thus serves as a de facto black college football national championship. This was the first ever meeting between South Carolina State and Prairie View A&M.

=== South Carolina State Bulldogs ===
South Carolina State, champions of the MEAC and led by second-year head coach Chennis Berry, made their third Celebration Bowl appearance, having previously won in 2021 and lost in 2024.

=== Prairie View A&M Panthers ===
Texas-based Prairie View A&M, champions of the SWAC for the first time since 2009 and led by first-year head coach Tremaine Jackson, made their first appearance and became the first team west of Louisiana to appear in the Celebration Bowl.

== Game summary ==
2025 Cricket Celebration Bowl

Quarter	1	2	3	4	OT	2OT	3OT	4OT	Total
South Carolina State	0	0	21	14	3	0	0	2	40
Prairie View A&M	7	14	7	7	3	0	0	0	38

at Mercedes-Benz Stadium • Atlanta, Georgia

- Date: December 13, 2025
- Game time: 12:00 p.m. EST
- Game weather: Sunny (retractable roof open)
- Game attendance: 26,703
- Referee: Scott Broadway
- TV announcers (ABC): Tiffany Greene (play-by-play), Jay Walker (analyst), Harry Lyles Jr. and Quint Kessenich (sideline reporters)
- Box score

Game information
First quarter
- PV – Ethan John 16-yard pass from Cameron Peters (Diego Alfaro kick), 1:02. Panthers 7–0. Drive: 6 plays, 69 yards, 2:17.

Second quarter

- PV – Cameron Peters 27-yard run (Diego Alfaro kick), 10:30. Panthers 14–0. Drive: 5 plays, 85 yards, 1:53.
- PV – Jyzaiah Rockwell 14-yard pass from Cameron Peters (Diego Alfaro kick), 1:05. Panthers 21–0. Drive: 11 plays, 95 yards, 4:32.

Third quarter

- SCST – Tyler Smith 5-yard run (Nico Cavanillas Alti kick), 11:19. Panthers 21–7. Drive: 1 play, 5 yards, 0:06.
- SCST – Jordan Smith 10-yard run (Nico Cavanillas Alti kick), 8:34. Panthers 21–14. Drive: 2 plays, 52 yards, 0:43.
- SCST – Jordan Smith 19-yard pass from Ryan Stubblefield (Nico Cavanillas Alti kick), 5:05. Tied 21–21. Drive: 4 plays, 49 yards, 2:07.
- PV – Andre Dennis 13-yard pass from Cameron Peters (Diego Alfaro kick), 2:38. Panthers 28–21. Drive: 6 plays, 75 yards, 2:27.

Fourth quarter

- SCST – Ryan Subblefield (Nico Cavanillas Alti kick), 10:44. Tied 28–28. Drive: 12 plays, 75 yards, 6:54.
- PV – Cameron Bonner 78-yard pass from Cameron Peters (Diego Alfaro kick), 9:53. Panthers 35–28. Drive: 2 plays, 75 yards, 0:51.
- SCST – Jordan Smith 10-yard pass from Ryan Subblefield (Nico Cavanillas Alti kick), 1:54. Tied 35–35. Drive: 13 plays, 62 yards, 5:14.

Overtime

- PV – Diego Alfaro 29-yard field goal. Panthers 38–35. Drive: 4 plays, 6 yards.
- SCST – Nico Cavanillas Alti 40-yard field goal. Tied 38–38. Drive: 4 plays, -5 yards.

2nd overtime

- No scoring plays

3rd overtime

- No scoring plays

4th overtime

- SCST – Ryan Subblefield two-point pass to Tyler Smith. Bulldogs 40–38.

=== Statistics ===
Statistics	SCST	PV
First downs	22	21
Plays–yards	80–357	67–491
Rushes–yards	41–78	28–55
Passing yards	279	436
Passing: comp–att–int	22–38–1	25–37–0
Time of possession	34:15	25:45

Team	Category	Player	Statistics
South Carolina State	Passing	Ryan Stubblefield	15/29, 234 yards, 2 TD, INT
South Carolina State	Rushing	Jordan Smith	5 carries, 28 yards, TD
South Carolina State	Receiving	Jordan Smith	9 receptions, 152 yards, 2 TD
Prairie View A&M	Passing	Cameron Peters	24/36, 412 yards, 4 TD
Prairie View A&M	Rushing	Cameron Peters	9 carries, 35 yards, TD
Prairie View A&M	Receiving	Andre Dennis	7 receptions, 131 yards, TD
