= Savannah State Tigers football =

Savannah State University college football team

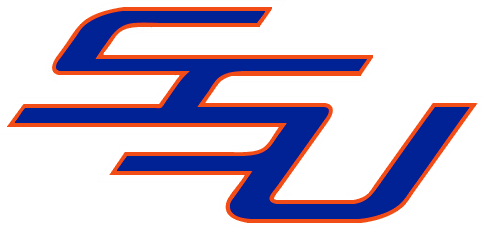
- First season: 1902; 124 years ago
- Athletic director: Opio Mashariki
- Head coach: Thomas Howard; 1st season, 1–4 (.200)
- Location: Savannah, Georgia
- Stadium: Ted Wright Stadium (capacity: 13,500)
- NCAA division: Division II
- Conference: Southern Intercollegiate Athletic Conference (SIAC)
- Colors: Burnt orange and reflex blue
- All-time record: 491–567–18 (.465)

Conference championships
- 12 (since 1940)
- Consensus All-Americans: 10
- Marching band: Savannah State Marching Tiger Band
- Website: ssuathletics.com

The Savannah State Tigers football team represents Savannah State University in college football. The Tigers are members of the Southern Intercollegiate Athletic Conference (SIAC). The football team is traditionally the most popular sport at Savannah State and home games are played at Ted A. Wright Stadium in Savannah, Georgia.

After moving to the NCAA Division I FCS in 2000, the Tigers compiled a record of 80–137. While in the FCS, the team competed in the Mid-Eastern Athletic Conference. In 2019, the Tigers moved back to NCAA Division II and rejoined the SIAC. Savannah State has played football since 1902, though they did not field a team in 1943 to 1945. Through the 2018 season, the Tigers compiled an all-time record of 491–567–18 (.465).

The program's largest margin of victory was 87 points in an 87–0 victory over Miles College in 1992. The largest margin of defeat was 98 points against Bethune-Cookman College in 1953 (Bethune-Cookman 98, Savannah State 0). Prior to a game against the Florida State Seminoles in 2012, the Seminoles were installed as 70.5 point favorites, reportedly making Savannah State the biggest underdogs in any college football game ever.

The team regularly participates in one or more black football classics each season, including the CSRA Football Classic and the Joe Turner Classic. The team has previously participated in the Gateway Classic, the Miami Classic, the Palmetto Capital City Classic, and the Circle City Classic.

== Conference affiliations ==
Conference	Joined	Left
Independent	1915	1928
Southeastern Athletic Conference	1929	1961
Independent	1962	1968
Southern Intercollegiate Athletic Conference (SIAC)	1969	1999
NCAA Division I-AA/FCS independent	2000	2009
Mid-Eastern Athletic Conference (MEAC)	2010	2018
Southern Intercollegiate Athletic Conference (SIAC)	2019	

No team: 1916–1922, 1924, 1943–1945

On September 8, 2010, Savannah State University was confirmed as a full member of the Mid-Eastern Athletic Conference (MEAC), making the Tigers eligible to participate in all conference championships and earn the conference's automatic berth to NCAA postseason competition in all sponsored sports.

== Conference championships and NCAA playoff appearances ==
The Tigers were Southeastern Athletic Conference champions in 1938, 1948, 1950, and 1956. The team's only playoff appearance occurred in 1992 The Tigers, led by head coach Bill Davis, were defeated by Jacksonville State in the first round of the NCAA Division II Football Championship playoffs, 41–16.

== Season-by-season records ==
NCAA I-AA MEAC NCAA I-AA Independent SIAC (NCAA Division II) NCAA Division III NAIA Southeastern

Season	Wins	Losses	Ties	Conference record	Head coach	Notes	References
2019	7	3	0		Shawn Quinn		
2013	4	8	0	3-5	Steve Davenport, Corey Barlow (Interim)		
2012	2	9	0	1-7	Steve Davenport		
2011	1	10	0	1-7	Steve Davenport		
2010	1	10	0		Julius Dixon (interim)		
2009	2	8	0		Robert Wells		
2008	5	7	0		Robert Wells		
2007	1	9	0		Theo Lemon		
2006	2	9	0		Theo Lemon	Savannah State University football program was placed on probation for three years by the NCAA in 2006. Prior to moving to Division I - FCS the team compiled a 97-108-4 record in NCAA Division II (1981–2000), a 15-20-0 record in NCAA Division III (1973–1980) and a 1-1-0 record as a member of the NAIA.	
2005	0	11	0		Richard Basil		
2004	2	8	0		Richard Basil		
2003	0	12	0		Kenneth Pettiford; Richard Basil		
2002	1	9	0		Kenneth Pettiford		
2001	2	7	0		Bill Davis		
2000	2	8	0		Bill Davis		
1999	5	6	0	3-4	Steven Wilks		
1998	7	4	0	7-2	Daryl McNeill	Savannah State placed on four years probation and scholarships reduced in six sports	
1997	3	8	0	2-6	Daryl McNeill		
1996	6	5	0	5-4	Wendell Avery		
1995	8	3	0	4-4	Wendell Avery		
1994	8	3	0	5-3	Joseph Crosby		
1993	7	3	0	6-2-0	Joseph Crosby		
1992	10	2	0	6-2	Bill Davis	Lost in first round of NCAA Division II playoffs	
1991	8	3	0	4-3	Bill Davis		
1990	7	4	0	5-2	Bill Davis		
1989	10	1	0		Bill Davis		
1988	8	3	0	6-1	Bill Davis		
1987	5	6	0	4-3	Bill Davis		
1986	7	4	0	5-3	Bill Davis		
1985	5	6	0	3-4	Frank Ellis		
1984	4	7	1	2-5-0	Frank Ellis		
1983	4	7	0		Frank Ellis		
1982	4	6	0	2-4	Frank Ellis		
1981	5	5	0	2-3	Frank Ellis		
1980	5	5	0		Frank Ellis		
1979	7	3	0	4-1-0	Frank Ellis		
1978	4	6	0	4-3	Frank Ellis		
1977	7	3	0	4-2	Frank Ellis		
1976	1	9	0	0-6	John H. Myles		
1975	3	7	0	2-3	John H. Myles		
1974	6	4	0	3-2	John H. Myles		
1973	4	6	0	2-4	John H. Myles		
1972	7	3	0	4-1	John H. Myles		
1971	6	4	0	4-1	John H. Myles		
1970	5	5	0	4-1	John H. Myles		
1969	5	5	0	3-2	John H. Myles		
1968	5	5	0		Leo Richardson		
1967	8	2	0		Leo Richardson		
1966	5	5	0		Leo Richardson		
1965	4	6	0		Leo Richardson		
1964	4	6	0		Leo Richardson		
1963	1	9	0		Leo Richardson		
1962	5	5	0	2-3	Richard K. Washington		
1961	6	4	0	3-2-0	Richard K. Washington		
1960	5	5	0	3-2	Richard K. Washington		
1959	7	3	0	4-1-0	Richard K. Washington		
1958	9	1	0	5-0	Richard K. Washington		
1957	7	3	0	3-2-0	Richard K. Washington		
1956	8	2	0	4-1	Ross F. Pearly	Southeastern Athletic Conference Co-Champions	
1955	6	4	0	3-2-0	Ross F. Pearly		
1954	3	7	0	1-5	Ross F. Pearly		
1953	5	5	0	2-3	Albert Frazier		
1952	2	8	0	1-4	John H. Martin		
1951	6	4	0	3-2-0	John H. Martin		
1950	5	3	0	4-0-0	John H. Martin	Southeastern Athletic Conference Champions	
1949	3	5	0	3-1	Theodore A. "Ted" Wright		
1948	5	3	0	4-1	Theodore A. "Ted" Wright	Southeastern Athletic Conference Champions	
1947	2	5	0	2-3-0	Theodore A. "Ted" Wright		
1946	6	1	0	6-1-0	John W. Myles		
1942	5	2	0		John W. Myles		
1941	4	3	0		W. McKinley King		
1940	4	3	0		W. McKinley King		
1939	6	0	0		Arthur Dwight		
1938	5	1	0		Arthur Dwight	Southeastern Athletic Conference Champions	
1937	3	2	1		Arthur Dwight		
1936	3	3	0		Arthur Dwight		
1935	3	3	0		Arthur Dwight		
1934	2	4	0		Richard Richardson		
1933	5	1	0		Richard Richardson		
1932	4	2	0		Richard Richardson		
1931	3	3	0		Richard Richardson		
1930	3	2	1		Richard Richardson		
1929	4	2	0		Richard Richardson		
1928	3	3	0		W.P. Tucker		
1927	3	3	0		W.P. Tucker		
1926	2	4	0		W.P. Tucker		
1925	6	0	0		W.P. Tucker		
1923	6	0	0		W.P. Tucker		
1915	3	3	0		W.P. Tucker		
Totals	11	74	0	NCAA Division I-AA Independent results			
Totals				NCAA Division II results			
Totals				NCAA Division III results			
Totals	44	72	11	NAIA results			
Totals	253	381	28	Regular season results			
Totals	0	1	0	Playoff results			
Totals	253	383	28	All games including playoffs			

== Retired numbers ==
The Tigers have retired only one number.

Savannah State Tigers retired numbers
No.	Player	Pos.	Tenure	Ref.
2	Shannon Sharpe	TE	1986–1989	

== Notable players and coaches ==
Some notable Savannah State football players and coaches include:

Name	Class year	Position	Notability	Reference(s)
Steven Aycock	1993	Offensive lineman	Head football coach at Johnson C. Smith University	
Eric Brown	1989	Cornerback/Safety	former NFL player with the Dallas Cowboys	
Chadrick Cone	2006	Running Back	Signed by the Georgia Force of the Arena Football League in 2006 and the Columbus Lions of the American Indoor Football Association in 2009	
Bobby Curtis	1987	Linebacker	former NFL player with the Washington Redskins and New York Jets	
Ken Dawson	1981	Running Back	10th round pick by the Seattle Seahawks; #252 overall pick	
Roy Ellison	1987	Guard/Center	NFL official and umpire during Super Bowl XLIII	
Aaron Fields	2000	Defensive End	former NFL player with the Dallas Cowboys	
Troy Hambrick	2000	Running Back	former NFL player who averaged 4.1 yards per carry in his 5 seasons with the Dallas Cowboys (2000–2003) and the Arizona Cardinals (2004).	
Britt Henderson	1996	Defensive Back	1996 First Team All American	
Patrick Jackson		unknown	former United Indoor Football player who played with the Rock River Raptors	
Jonathan Johnson		unknown	former United Indoor Football player who played with the Rock River Raptors	
Lemuel Ligdon		unknown	former NFL Europe player who played with the Rhein Fire	
Wesley McGriff	1990	Outside Linebacker	current defensive backs coach and defensive recruiting coordinator for the Vanderbilt Commodores. Former defensive backs coach for the Miami Hurricanes and former interim coach and defensive coordinator at Savannah State University.	
Ernest "The Cat" Miller		Linebacker	All-American linebacker and former professional wrestler	
Andrew Mitchell		unknown	former Arena Football League player who played with the Arizona Rattlers	
Tahj Mowry		Running Back	former child actor from the sitcom "Smart Guy", played football at SSU for 1 season	
Wes Phillips	1979	Offensive Tackle	former NFL player with the Houston Oilers	
Shannon Sharpe	1986–89	Wide Receiver / Tight End	1989 First team All American, former NFL player with the Denver Broncos and Baltimore Ravens, three-time Super Bowl champion, and former NFL's all-time leader in receptions (815) by a tight end (record now held by Tony Gonzalez). He was elected to the Pro Football Hall of Fame in 2011.	
Roosevelt Williams	1998	Cornerback	former NFL player with the Chicago Bears Denver Broncos and Cleveland Browns	
Tim Walker	1980	Linebacker	1979 First Team All American and former NFL player with the Seattle Seahawks	
Steve Wilks	1999	Defensive coordinator	former defensive coordinator for the San Francisco 49ers	
