= 2026 Maryland Terrapins football team =

American college football season

2026 Maryland Terrapins football
- Conference: Big Ten Conference
- Record: 4–7 (2–6 Big Ten)
- Head coach: Mike Locksley (8th season; first 7 games); Aazaar Abdul-Rahim (interim; remainder of season)
- Offensive coordinator: Clint Trickett (1st season)
- Offensive scheme: Run and gun
- Defensive coordinator: Ted Monachino (2nd season; first 7 games)
- Base defense: 3–4
- Home stadium: SECU Stadium

2026 Big Ten Conference football standings
	Conf.			Overall
Team	W		L	W		L
No. 4 UCLA	7	–	1	10	–	1
No. 8 Indiana	6	–	2	9	–	2
No. 15 Iowa	6	–	2	9	–	2
No. 13 Oregon	6	–	2	8	–	3
No. 18 USC	5	–	3	8	–	3
No. 14 Ohio State	5	–	3	7	–	4
Wisconsin	5	–	3	7	–	4
Nebraska	4	–	4	7	–	4
Washington	4	–	4	7	–	4
Illinois	4	–	4	6	–	5
Minnesota	4	–	4	6	–	5
Michigan	3	–	5	6	–	5
Northwestern	3	–	5	6	–	5
Penn State	3	–	5	6	–	5
Maryland	2	–	6	4	–	7
Purdue	2	–	6	3	–	8
Rutgers	2	–	6	3	–	8
Michigan State	1	–	7	3	–	8
Championship: December 5, 2026
^ – College Football Playoff participant; $ – Conference champion; y – Championship game participant; As of November 22, 2026; Rankings from CFP rankings

The 2026 Maryland Terrapins football team represents the University of Maryland, College Park in the Big Ten Conference during the 2026 NCAA Division I FBS football season. The Terrapins play their home games at SECU Stadium located in College Park, Maryland.

The Terrapins were led by eighth year head coach Mike Locksley for the first seven games of the season. Locksley was fired on October 21 with co-defensive coordinator Aazaar Abdul-Rahim being named interim head coach.

== Offseason ==
=== Transfers ===
Incoming

Name	Pos.	Height	Weight	Hometown	Prev. school
Harry Dalton	RB	5'11"	205 lbs	Dinwiddie, VA	USC
Na'eem Gladding	WR	5'11"	190 lbs	Middle Village, NY	Old Dominion
Derrick LeBlanc	DL	6'5"	265 lbs	Kissimmee, FL	UCF
Amari Jackson	CB	5'10"	170 lbs	McDonough, GA	Boston College
Lavon Johnson	DL	6'3"	295 lbs	Allentown, PA	Texas
Preston Howard	TE	6'5"	202 lbs	Owings Mills, MD	Auburn
Tellek Lockette	IOL	6'3"	285 lbs	Miami, FL	Texas State
Jayvon Parker	DL	6'4"	270 lbs	Dearborn, MI	Washington
Armon Parker	DL	6'4"	270 lbs	Dearborn, MI	Washington
Chris Durr	WR	5'11"	150 lbs	Chicago, IL	Wyoming
Callum Wither	QB	6'4"	210 lbs	Buffalo, NY	Ohio
Stephen Dean	LB	6'2"	225 lbs	Mineral, VA	VMI
Terrez Worthy	RB	5'8"	170 lbs	Salisbury, MD	Temple
Cardell Williams	QB	6'2"	170 lbs	Houston, TX	Sacramento State
Devin Kargman	QB	6'3"	225 lbs	Camden, NJ	Kent State
Callum Wither	QB	6'4"	211 lbs	Mississauga, ON	Wilfrid Laurier
Max Lawrence	QB	6'3"	200 lbs	Hialeah, FL	Graceland

Outgoing

Name	Pos.	Height	Weight	Hometown	New school
Shamar McIntosh	S	6'2"	185 lbs	Washington, D.C.	Charlotte
Khristian Martin	QB	6'2.5"	200 lbs	Highland Springs, VA	Fresno State
Neeo Avery	EDGE	6'4.5"	225 lbs	Glen Burnie, MD	South Dakota
Justyn Martin	QB	6'2"	201 lbs	Inglewood, CA	Ohio State
Lakhi Roland	CB	6'1"	175 lbs	Ellenwood, GA	Arkansas
Kevyn Humes	CB	5'11"	170 lbs	Baltimore, MD	Rutgers
Jahmari Powell-Wonson	WR	6'2"	185 lbs	Baltimore, MD	Florida Atlantic
Nolan Ray	RB	6'0"	198 lbs	Southfield, MI	Boston College
Dillan Fontus	DL	6'4"	260 lbs	Brooklyn, NY	Syracuse
Sedrick Smith	DL	6'4"	310 lbs	Atlanta, GA	Colorado
Braydon Lee	CB	5'11.5"	160 lbs	Springdale, MD	Arkansas
Michael Harris	LB	6'0"	185 lbs	Altamonte Springs, FL	South Florida
Aliou Bah	IOL	6'5"	325 lbs	Bradenton, FL	LSU
Leon Haughton Jr.	TE	6'4"	227 lbs	Richmond, VA	Old Dominion
Josiah McLaurin	RB	6'1"	188 lbs	Clinton, NC	Marshall
Dimitry Nicolas	DL	6'3"	294 lbs	Opa Locka, FL	Sam Houston
Roman Jensen	QB	6'1"	210 lbs	Lewisberry, PA	Shippensburg
Bud Coombs	RB	5'10"	185 lbs	Mechanicsville, MD	Vanderbilt
Elias Johnson	RB	6'0"	210 lbs	Tempe, AZ	Southwestern (CA)
Colin Reynolds	RB	6'0"	204 lbs	Bethesda, MD	TBA

=== NFL draft ===
Round	Pick	Player	Position	NFL Club
3	100	Jalen Huskey	S	Jacksonville Jaguars

== Schedule ==
Date	Time	Opponent	Site	TV	Result	Attendance
September 5	8:00 p.m.	Hampton*	SECU Stadium; College Park, MD	BTN	W 62–0	43,421
September 12	3:30 p.m.	at UConn*	Pratt & Whitney Stadium at Rentschler Field; East Hartford, CT	CBSSN	W 38–14	34,494
September 19	7:30 p.m.	Virginia Tech*	SECU Stadium; College Park, MD	FS1	L 26–35	46,185
September 26	1:30 p.m.	UCLA	SECU Stadium; College Park, MD	BTN	L 3–54	40,125
October 3	4:00 p.m.	at Nebraska	Memorial Stadium; Lincoln, NE	FS1	L 23–48	85,033
October 10	4:15 p.m.	at No. 5 Ohio State	Ohio Stadium; Columbus, OH	BTN	L 16–45	102,589
October 17	12:30 p.m.	Rutgers^{†}	SECU Stadium; College Park, MD (rivalry)	BTN	L 30–37	39,326
October 31	12:00 p.m.	Illinois	SECU Stadium; College Park, MD	FS1	L 17–20	27,207
November 7	12:30 p.m.	at Purdue	Ross–Ade Stadium; West Lafayette, IN	BTN	W 34–29	51,929
November 14	12:00 p.m.	Wisconsin	SECU Stadium; College Park, MD	FS1	W 24–21	28,885
November 21	6:15 p.m.	at No. 18 USC	Los Angeles Memorial Coliseum; Los Angeles, CA	BTN	L 21–35	53,694
November 28	3:30 p.m.	Penn State	SECU Stadium; College Park, MD (rivalry)	FS1		
*Non-conference game; ^{†}Homecoming; Rankings from AP Poll (and CFP Rankings, after November 3) – Released prior to game; All times are in Eastern time; Source:

== Game summaries ==
=== vs. Hampton (FCS) ===
Hampton Pirates (FCS) (1–0) at Maryland Terrapins (0–0) – Game summary

Quarter	1	2	3	4	Total
Pirates (FCS)	0	0	0	0	0
Terrapins	17	17	21	7	62

at SECU Stadium • College Park, Maryland

- Date: September 5
- Game time: 8:00 p.m. EST
- Game weather: Sunny • Temperature: 77 °F (25 °C) • Wind: NE at 3 miles per hour (4.8 km/h)
- Game attendance: 43,421
- Referee: Jeremy Valentine
- TV announcers (BTN): Joe Beninati, Matt Millen and Michella Chester

Game information

First quarter

- MD – DeJuan Williams 94-yard run (Sean O'Haire kick), 9:30. Terrapins 7–0. Drive: 1 play, 94 yards, 0:14.
- MD – DeJuan Williams 8-yard run (Sean O'Haire kick), 4:43. Terrapins 14–0. Drive: 5 plays, 36 yards, 1:47.
- MD – Sean O'Haire 26-yard field goal, 1:28. Terrapins 17–0. Drive: 4 plays, -1 yard, 0:49.

Second quarter

- MD – Sean O'Haire 36-yard field goal, 12:32. Terrapins 20–0. Drive: 6 plays, 49 yards, 2:16.
- MD – Iverson Howard 11-yard run (Sean O'Haire kick), 5:54. Terrapins 27–0. Drive: 11 plays, 75 yards, 4:33.
- MD – Na'eem Abdul-Rahim Gladding 10-yard pass from Malik Washington (Sean O'Haire kick), 0:06. Terrapins 34–0. Drive: 10 plays, 64 yards, 1:28.

Third quarter

- MD – Iverson Howard 8-yard run (Sean O'Haire kick), 11:24. Terrapins 41–0. Drive: 8 plays, 54 yards, 2:31.
- MD – Harry Dalton III 9-yard run (Sean O'Haire kick), 8:08. Terrapins 48–0. Drive: 4 plays, 56 yards, 1:16.
- MD – Jordan Scott 16-yard pass from Cardell Williams (Sean O'Haire kick), 2:32. Terrapins 55–0. Drive: 8 plays, 70 yards, 3:37.

Fourth quarter

- MD – Jianni Davis 5-yard run (Eli Fulcher kick), 13:19. Terrapins 62–0. Drive: 5 plays, 39 yards, 2:52.

Statistics	HAMP	MD
First downs	6	31
Plays–yards	50–85	78–646
Rushes–yards	31–10	40–365
Passing yards	75	281
Passing: comp–att–int	10–19–3	25–38–0
Turnovers	3	0
Time of possession	30:57	29:03

Team	Category	Player	Statistics
Hampton	Passing	Jalen Woods	7/12, 56 yards, 2 INT
Hampton	Rushing	Gracen Goldsmith	7 carries, 26 yards
Hampton	Receiving	Chaz Portis	2 receptions, 40 yards
Maryland	Passing	Malik Washington	19/31, 186 yards, TD
Maryland	Rushing	DeJuan Williams	3 carries, 116 yards, 2 TD
Maryland	Receiving	Na'eem Abdul-Rahim Gladding	6 receptions, 57 yards, TD

=== at UConn ===
Maryland Terrapins (1–0) at UConn Huskies (1–0) – Game summary

Quarter	1	2	3	4	Total
Terrapins	7	10	14	7	38
Huskies	7	0	7	0	14

at Pratt & Whitney Stadium at Rentschler Field • East Hartford, Connecticut

- Date: September 12
- Game time: 3:30 p.m. EST
- Game weather: Sunny • Temperature: 77 °F (25 °C) • Wind: S at 8 miles per hour (13 km/h)
- Game attendance: 34,494
- Referee: Jeff Servinski
- TV announcers (CBSSN): Jordan Kent, Ben DiNucci, Doug Pederson and Brandon Baylor

Game information

First quarter

- CONN - JD Willoughby 36-yard pass from Kalieb Osborne (Jack O'Connor kick), 4:39. Huskies 7–0. Drive: 3 plays, 47 yards, 01:21.
- MD - Na'eem Abdul-Rahim Gladding 60-yard pass from Malik Washington (Sean O'Haire kick), 3:24. Tied 7–7. Drive: 4 plays, 75 yards, 01:15.

Second quarter

- MD - Harry Dalton III 4-yard run (Sean O'Haire kick), 7:51. Terrapins 14–7. Drive: 9 plays, 92 yards, 05:09.
- MD - Sean O'Haire 19-yard field goal, 0:04. Terrapins 17–7. Drive: 15 plays, 91 yards, 03:52.

Third quarter

- MD - Iverson Howard 1-yard run (Sean O'Haire kick), 8:42. Terrapins 24–7. Drive: 10 plays, 71 yards, 04:53.
- CONN - Shamar Porter 39-yard pass from Kalieb Osborne (Jack O'Connor kick), 5:29. Terrapins 24–14. Drive: 7 plays, 77 yards, 03:04.
- MD - Harry Dalton III 2-yard run (Sean O'Haire kick), 1:53. Terrapins 31–14. Drive: 8 plays, 75 yards, 03:37.

Fourth quarter

- MD - Chris Durr Jr. 13-yard pass from Malik Washington (Sean O'Haire kick), 10:57. Terrapins 38–14. Drive: 2 plays, 18 yards, 00:41.

Statistics	MD	CONN
First downs	27	12
Plays–yards	78–475	52–223
Rushes–yards	36–125	31–67
Passing yards	350	156
Passing: comp–att–int	35–42–0	10–21–0
Turnovers	0	1
Time of possession	35:31	24:29

Team	Category	Player	Statistics
Maryland	Passing	Malik Washington	34/41, 347 yards, 2 TD
Maryland	Rushing	Iverson Howard	14 carries, 55 yards, TD
Maryland	Receiving	Na'eem Abdul-rahim Gladding	8 receptions, 130 yards, TD
UConn	Passing	Kalieb Osborne	10/21, 156 yards, 2 TD
UConn	Rushing	Kalieb Osborne	13 carries, 30 yards
UConn	Receiving	Shamar Porter	3 receptions, 62 yards, TD

=== vs. Virginia Tech ===
Virginia Tech Hokies (2–0) at Maryland Terrapins (2–0) – Game summary

Quarter	1	2	3	4	Total
Hokies	7	20	8	0	35
Terrapins	0	14	0	12	26

at SECU Stadium • College Park, Maryland

- Date: September 19
- Game time: 7:30 p.m. EST
- Game weather: Sunny • Temperature: 76 °F (24 °C) • Wind: NE at 5 miles per hour (8.0 km/h)
- Game attendance: 46,185
- Referee: Garrett Dickerson
- TV announcers (FS1): Eric Collins and Spencer Tillman

Game information

First quarter

- (8:15) VT – Luke Reynolds 14-yard pass from Ethan Grunkemeyer, John Love kick (Drive: 13 plays, 75 yards, 6:45; Hokies 7–0)

Second quarter

- (14:51) VT – Ethan Grunkemeyer 18-yard run (Drive: 11 plays, 74 yards, 5:49; Hokies 13–0)
- (12:31) MD – Iverson Howard 2-yard run, Sean O'Haire (Drive: 7 plays, 75 yards, 2:20; Hokies 13–7)
- (9:14) VT – Jeffrey Overton Jr. 49-yard pass from Ethan Grunkemeyer, John Love kick (Drive: 7 plays, 75 yards, 3:17; Hokies 20–7)
- (2:11) MD – Chris Durr Jr. 12-yard pass from Malik Washington, Sean O'Haire kick (Drive: 5 plays, 67 yards, 2:05; Hokies 20–14)
- (0:16) VT – Ja'Ricous Hairston 2-yard pass from Ethan Grunkemeyer, John Love kick (Drive: 11 plays, 75 yards, 1:55; Hokies 27–14)

Third quarter

- (0:16) VT – Jeffrey Overton Jr. 2-yard run, Que'Sean Brown pass (Drive: 11 plays, 67 yards, 6:12; Hokies 35–14)

Fourth quarter

- (12:36) MD – Dorian Fleming 2-yard pass from Malik Washington (Drive: 13 plays, 81 yards, 5:07; Hokies 35–20)
- (5:34) MD – Chris Durr Jr. 13-yard pass from Malik Washington (Drive: 9 plays, 80 yards, 3:19; Hokies 35–26)

Statistics	VT	MD
First downs	25	23
Total yards	445	423
Rushes–yards	36–131	21–64
Passing yards	314	359
Passing: comp–att–int	31–39–0	30–43–0
Time of possession	36:39	23:21

Team	Category	Player	Statistics
Virginia Tech	Passing	Ethan Grunkemeyer	31–39, 314 yards, 3 TD
Virginia Tech	Rushing	Marcellous Hawkins Jr.	16 carries, 75 yards
Virginia Tech	Receiving	Luke Reynolds	12 receptions, 107 yards, TD
Maryland	Passing	Malik Washington	30–43, 359 yards, 3 TD
Maryland	Rushing	Harry Dalton III	6 carries, 26 yards
Maryland	Receiving	Chris Durr Jr.	12 receptions, 109 yards, 2 TD

=== vs. UCLA ===
UCLA Bruins (3–0) at Maryland Terrapins (2–1) – Game summary

Quarter	1	2	3	4	Total
Bruins	0	20	14	20	54
Terrapins	0	3	0	0	3

at SECU Stadium • College Park, Maryland

- Date: September 26
- Game time: 1:30 p.m. EST
- Game weather: Cloudy • Temperature: 65 °F (18 °C) • Wind: N at 11 miles per hour (18 km/h)
- Game attendance: 40,125
- Referee: Gregory Blum
- TV announcers (BTN): Mark Followill (play-by-play), Rhett Lewis (analyst) and Caroline Hendershot (sideline)

Statistics	UCLA	MD
First downs	19	13
Plays–yards	63–475	69–181
Rushes–yards	39–266	30–39
Passing yards	209	142
Passing: comp–att–int	15–24–0	19–39–4
Time of possession	31:34	28:24

Team	Category	Player	Statistics
UCLA	Passing	Nico Iamaleava	15/24, 209 yards, TD
UCLA	Rushing	Wayne Knight	10 carries, 100 yards, TD
UCLA	Receiving	Aidan Mizell	1 reception, 83 yards, TD
Maryland	Passing	Malik Washington	18/38, 142 yards, 4 INT
Maryland	Rushing	Iverson Howard	12 carries, 34 yards
Maryland	Receiving	Chris Durr	7 receptions, 56 yards

=== at Nebraska ===
Maryland Terrapins (2–2) at Nebraska Cornhuskers (4–0) – Game summary

Quarter	1	2	3	4	Total
Terrapins	16	7	0	0	23
Cornhuskers	7	21	0	20	48

at Memorial Stadium • Lincoln, Nebraska

- Date: October 3
- Game time: 4:00 p.m. EST
- Game weather: Sunny, 69 degrees, Wind SW @ 12 mph
- Game attendance: 85,033
- Referee: Jim Wharrie
- TV announcers (FS1): Dan Hellie (play-by-play) and Robert Smith (analyst)

Game information

First Quarter

- (12:15) MD – Sean O'Haire 26-yard field goal (Drive: 9 plays, 67 yards, 02:45, Maryland 3–0)
- (9:11) NEB – Mekhi Nelson 19-yard rush (Kyle Cunanan kick) (Drive: 1 plays, 19 yards, 0:07, Nebraska 7-3)
- (8:33) MD - Chris Durr Jr. 65-yard pass from Malik Washington (Sean O'Haire kick) (Drive: 3 plays, 75 yards, 0:38, Maryland 10-7)
- (4:12) MD - Sean O'Haire 42-yard field goal (Drive: 7 plays, 37 yards, 2:54, Maryland 13-7)
- (2:22) MD - Sean O'Haire 32-yard field goal (Drive: 4 plays, 5 yards, 1:01, Maryland 16-7)

Second Quarter

- (12:37) NEB – Mekhi Nelson 5-yard rush (Kyle Cunanan kick) (Drive: 10 plays, 79 yards, 04:40, Maryland 16-14)
- (8:54) MD - DeJuan Williams 3-yard rush (Sean O'Haire kick) (Drive: 2 play, 59 yards, 0:31, Maryland 23-14)
- (2:41) NEB - Dwayne McDougle 81-yard interception return (Kyle Cunanan kick) (03:24, Maryland 23-21)
- (0:05) NEB - Luke Lindenmeyer 1-yard pass from Anthony Colandrea (Kyle Cunanan kick) (Drive: 8 plays, 80 yards, 1:44, Nebraska 28-23)

Third Quarter

- (No Scoring)

Fourth Quarter

- (14:58) NEB – Vincent Genatone 1-yard rush (Kyle Cunanan kick) (Drive: 11 plays, 58 yards, 4:36, Nebraska 35-23)
- (10:32) NEB - Kwazi Gilmer 5-yard pass from Anthony Colandrea (Kyle Cunanan kick) (Drive: 5 plays, 85 yards, 2:31, Nebraska 42-23)
- (6:35) NEB - Kwazi Gilmer 30-yard pass from Anthony Colandrea (Kyle Cunanan kick missed) (Drive: 5 plays, 43 yards, 2:52, Nebraska 48-23)

Statistics	MD	NEB
First downs	19	28
Plays–yards	69–395	75–447
Rushes–yards	25–141	36–209
Passing yards	254	238
Passing: comp–att–int	23–44–2	26–39–1
Time of possession	25:36	34:24

Team	Category	Player	Statistics
Maryland	Passing	Malik Washington	23/44, 254 yards, TD, 2 INT
Maryland	Rushing	DeJuan Williams	10 carries, 78 yards, TD
Maryland	Receiving	Chris Durr Jr	7 receptions, 149 yards, TD
Nebraska	Passing	Anthony Colandrea	26/39, 238 yards, 3 TD, INT
Nebraska	Rushing	Anthony Colandrea	10 carries, 108 yards
Nebraska	Receiving	Kwazi Gilmer	11 receptions, 147 yards, 2 TD

=== at No. 5 Ohio State ===
Maryland Terrapins (2–3) at No. 5 Ohio State Buckeyes (4–1) – Game summary

Quarter	1	2	3	4	Total
Terrapins	3	7	6	0	16
No. 5 Buckeyes	14	17	7	7	45

at Ohio Stadium • Columbus, Ohio

- Date: October 10
- Game time: 4:15 p.m. EST
- Game weather: Cloudy • Temperature: 71 °F (22 °C) • Wind: SE at 9 miles per hour (14 km/h)
- Game attendance: 102,589
- Referee: Jason Nickleby
- TV announcers (BTN): Mark Followill, Jake Butt, and Brooke Fletcher

Game information

First Quarter

- (8:40) Ohio State - Jeremiah Smith 33-yard pass from Julian Sayin (Connor Hawkins kick), (Drive: 2 plays, 36 yards, 1:07; Ohio State 7-0)
- (3:55) Maryland - Sean O'Haire 39-yard field goal (Drive: 7 plays, 11 yards, 2:29; Ohio State 7-3)
- (3:03) Ohio State - Nate Roberts 68-yard pass from Julian Sayin (Connor Hawkins kick), (Drive: 2 plays, 71 yards, 0:46; Ohio State 14-3)

Second Quarter

- (11:23) Maryland - Malik Washington 5-yard rush (Sean O'Haire kick), (Drive: 11 plays, 75 yards, 6:40; Ohio State 14-10)
- (8:32) Ohio State - Jeremiah Smith 40-yard pass from Julian Sayin (Connor Hawkins kick), (Drive: 5 plays, 77 yards, 2:46; Ohio State 21-10)
- (5:55) Ohio State - Connor Hawkins 40-yard field goal (Drive: 6 plays, 42 yards, 1:39; Ohio State 24-10)
- (0:24) Ohio State - Mason Williams 1-yard pass from Julian Sayin (Connor Hawkins kick), (Drive: 8 plays, 44 yards, 3:11; Ohio State 31-10)

Third Quarter

- (5:12) Maryland - Daniel Wingate returns a 52-yard interception for a touchdown (Two-Point Conversation pass failed), (Drive: 3 plays, 25 yards, 2:32; Ohio State 31-16)
- (2:38) Ohio State - Bo Jackson 25-yard rush (Connor Hawkins kick), (Drive: 7 plays, 64 yards, 2:32; Ohio State 38-16)

Fourth Quarter

- (4:52) Ohio State - Bo Jackson 2-yard rush (Connor Hawkins kick), (Drive: 16 plays, 72 yards, 9:59; Ohio State 45-19)

Statistics	MD	OSU
First downs	10	24
Plays–yards	53–146	69–449
Rushes–yards	28–82	48–207
Passing yards	64	242
Passing: comp–att–int	12–25–0	13–21–1
Turnovers	0	2
Time of possession	25:21	34:39

Team	Category	Player	Statistics
Maryland	Passing	Malik Washington	12/25, 64 yards
Maryland	Rushing	Dejuan Williams	16 carries, 48 yards
Maryland	Receiving	Chris Durr Jr.	4 receptions, 15 yards
Ohio State	Passing	Julian Sayin	13/21, 242 yards. 4 TD, INT
Ohio State	Rushing	Bo Jackson	23 carries, 107 yards, 2 TD
Ohio State	Receiving	Jeremiah Smith	4 receptions, 93 yards, 2 TD

=== vs. Rutgers ===
Rutgers Scarlet Knights (1–4) at Maryland Terrapins (2–4) – Game summary

Quarter	1	2	3	4	Total
Scarlet Knights	7	6	10	14	37
Terrapins	7	16	0	7	30

at SECU Stadium • College Park, Maryland

- Date: October 17
- Game weather: Sunny
- Game attendance: 39,326
- Referee: Chris Coyte
- TV announcers: Wayne Randazzo, Jake Butt, and Brooke Fletcher

Statistics	RUTG	MD
First downs	28	19
Plays–yards	74–442	64–378
Rushes–yards	39–151	26–115
Passing yards	291	263
Passing: comp–att–int	23–35–1	19–38–0
Time of possession	38:00	22:00

Team	Category	Player	Statistics
Rutgers	Passing	Dylan Lonergan	23/35, 291 yards, 3 TD, 1 INT
Rutgers	Rushing	Clay Thevenin	17 carries, 109 yards, 1 TD
Rutgers	Receiving	KJ Duff	9 receptions, 113 yards, 2 TD
Maryland	Passing	Malik Washington	19/38, 263 yards, 2 TD
Maryland	Rushing	Malik Washington	9 carries, 56 yards
Maryland	Receiving	Chris Durr Jr.	6 receptions, 104 yards

=== vs. Illinois ===
Illinois Fighting Illini (4–3) at Maryland Terrapins (2–5) – Game summary

Quarter	1	2	3	4	Total
Fighting Illini	0	7	3	10	20
Terrapins	7	0	7	3	17

at SECU Stadium • College Park, Maryland

- Date: October 31

Statistics	ILL	MD
First downs	20	17
Plays–yards	65–407	58–288
Rushes–yards	33–184	29–98
Passing yards	223	190
Passing: comp–att–int	18–32–1	19–29–1
Time of possession	29:46	30:14

Team	Category	Player	Statistics
Illinois	Passing	Katin Houser	18/32, 223 yards, 1 TD, 1 INT
Illinois	Rushing	Javari Barnett	6 carries, 80 yards, 1 TD
Illinois	Receiving	Collin Dixon	6 receptions, 103 yards
Maryland	Passing	Malik Washington	19/29, 190 yards, 1 INT
Maryland	Rushing	Dejuan Williams	19 carries, 57 yards, 1 TD
Maryland	Receiving	Chris Durr Jr.	6 receptions, 58 yards

=== at Purdue ===
Maryland Terrapins (2–6) at Purdue Boilermakers (3–5) – Game summary

Quarter	1	2	3	4	Total
Terrapins	0	7	21	6	34
Boilermakers	3	9	7	10	29

at Ross–Ade Stadium • West Lafayette, Indiana

- Date: November 7
- Game weather: Sunny
- Game attendance: 51,929

Statistics	MD	PUR
First downs	12	26
Plays–yards	45–390	80–425
Rushes–yards	27–137	42–129
Passing yards	253	296
Passing: comp–att–int	13–18–1	24–38–0
Time of possession	24:04	35:56

Team	Category	Player	Statistics
Maryland	Passing	Malik Washington	13/18, 253 yards, 2 TD, 1 INT
Maryland	Rushing	DeJuan Williams	14 carries, 99 yards, 1 TD
Maryland	Receiving	Chris Durr. Jr	4 receptions, 127 yards, 1 TD
Purdue	Passing	Ryan Browne	24/38, 296 yards
Purdue	Rushing	Antonio Harris	5 carries, 51 yards
Purdue	Receiving	Tra'Mar Harris	3 receptions, 76 yards

=== vs. Wisconsin ===
Wisconsin Badgers (6–3) at Maryland Terrapins (3–6) – Game summary

Quarter	1	2	3	4	Total
Badgers	7	3	3	8	21
Terrapins	0	7	7	10	24

at SECU Stadium • College Park, Maryland

- Date: November 14
- Game weather: Sunny
- Game attendance: 28,885

Statistics	WIS	MD
First downs	15	15
Plays–yards	56–201	62–290
Rushes–yards	31–102	39–107
Passing yards	99	183
Passing: comp–att–int	13–25–0	21–23–0
Time of possession	26:20	33:40

Team	Category	Player	Statistics
Wisconsin	Passing	Ryan Hopkins	11/22, 77 yards
Wisconsin	Rushing	Darrion Dupree	14 carries, 57 yards, 2 TD
Wisconsin	Receiving	Jaylon Domingeaux	2 receptions, 28 yards
Maryland	Passing	Cardell Williams	21/23, 183 yards, 1 TD
Maryland	Rushing	Dejuan Williams	22 carries, 79 yards
Maryland	Receiving	Preston Howard	4 receptions, 77 yards, 1 TD

=== at No. 18 USC ===
Maryland Terrapins (4–6) at No. 18 USC Trojans (7–3) – Game summary

Quarter	1	2	3	4	Total
Terrapins	0	14	0	7	21
No. 18 Trojans	10	3	7	15	35

at Los Angeles Memorial Coliseum • Los Angeles, California

- Date: November 21
- TV announcers (BTN): Wayne Randazzo, Rhett Lewis, and Caroline Hendershot

Statistics	MD	USC
First downs		
Plays–yards		
Rushes–yards		
Passing yards		
Passing: comp–att–int		
Time of possession		

Team	Category	Player	Statistics
Maryland	Passing		
Maryland	Rushing		
Maryland	Receiving		
USC	Passing		
USC	Rushing		
USC	Receiving		

=== vs. Penn State ===
Penn State Nittany Lions (0–0) at Maryland Terrapins (0–0) – Game summary

Quarter	1	2	3	4	Total
Nittany Lions	0	0	0	0	0
Terrapins	0	0	0	0	0

at SECU Stadium • College Park, Maryland

- Date: November 28

Statistics	PSU	MD
First downs		
Plays–yards		
Rushes–yards		
Passing yards		
Passing: comp–att–int		
Time of possession		

Team	Category	Player	Statistics
Penn State	Passing		
Penn State	Rushing		
Penn State	Receiving		
Maryland	Passing		
Maryland	Rushing		
Maryland	Receiving		

== Personnel ==
=== Roster ===
2026 Maryland Terrapins football team roster
Players
Coaches
Offense

Pos.	#	Name	Class
RB	0	DeJuan Williams	So
WR	1	Na'eem Gladding	Jr
WR	2	Kaleb Webb	Sr
QB	6	Cardell Williams	Sr
QB	7	Malik Washington	So
TE	8	Preston Howard	Sr
TE	9	Dorian Fleming	Jr
WR	10	Zymear Smith	Fr
WR	11	Ryan Manning	Jr
QB	12	Nathan Bernhard	Fr
WR	13	Chris Durr Jr.	Jr
WR	14	Jordan Scott	Sr
QB	15	Jackson Hamilton	Fr
TE	16	Damon Hall Jr.	Fr
WR	17	Jayden Kitchens	Fr
WR	18	Josiah Teasley	Fr
FB	20	DJ Samuels	Jr
WR	21	Sean Williams	Jr
QB	22	Jack Capaldi	GS
QB	23	Max Lawrence	Jr
RB	24	Iverson Howard	So
RB	25	Harry Dalton III	Fr
RB	29	Liam Willson	Jr
TE	39	Daniel Owens	Sr
RB	45	Solomon Foye	Fr
OL	50	Trevor Szymanski	So
OL	51	Michael McMonigle	Fr
OL	54	Lamar Williams	Fr
OL	55	Tellek Lockette	Sr
OL	57	Jesse Moody	Fr
OL	61	Michael Hershey	Jr
OL	64	Aaron Folivi	Sr
OL	66	Teagan Cox	Fr
OL	67	Jonathan Panagou	Fr
OL	68	Carlos Moore	Sr
OL	69	Logan Bennett	So
OL	70	Jaylen Gilchrist	Fr
OL	71	Ryan Howerton	So
OL	72	Ben Beymer	Fr
OL	73	Davon Watkins	So
OL	74	Isaiah Wright	GS
OL	75	Day'Jon Moore	Fr
OL	76	Rahtrel Perry	Sr
OL	77	Amory Hills	So
OL	78	Anthony Robsock	So
WR	80	Ejani Shakir	Jr
TE	81	Javonte Williams	Fr
WR	83	Emerson Smith	So
TE	84	Thomas McCluskey	Jr
TE	85	JT Taggart	So
TE	86	Brayden Marko	Fr
WR	88	Justin DeVaughn	Fr
TE	89	AJ Szymanski	Sr

Defense

Pos.	#	Name	Class
DL	0	Zion Elee	Fr
LB	1	Daniel Wingate	Sr
DB	2	Lavain Scruggs	Sr
LB	3	Trey Reddick	Jr
DB	4	Jamare Glasker	Sr
DB	5	Darrell Carey	Fr
DB	6	Dontay Joyner	Sr
DB	7	Gavin Edwards	Jr
DB	8	Mekhai White	So
DL	9	Zahir Mathis	So
DL	10	Cam Brickle II	Fr
DL	11	Sidney Stewart	So
DB	12	Jayden Shipps	So
DB	14	Sean Johnson	Fr
DB	15	Lloyd Irvin III	So
DB	18	Alex Moore	Jr
DB	20	Ontario Washington	Fr
DB	21	Judah Jenkins	So
DB	22	Zahir Cobb	Fr
DB	24	Amari Jackson	Sr
DB	25	Ricardo Cooper Jr.	Jr
DB	26	Hakim Satterwhite	Fr
LB	27	Kaden Carter	Fr
LB	30	Travares Daniels II	Fr
LB	32	Carlton Smith	So
DB	33	Messiah Delhomme	So
DL	34	Jianni Davis	Fr
LB	35	Keyari James	So
DB	38	Taylor Best	Jr
DL	40	Nahsir Taylor	So
DL	44	Joel Starlings	Jr
LB	48	Darius Grimes	Jr
LB	49	Chris Wells	Jr
DL	50	EJ Moore Jr.	Jr
LB	53	Kellen McConnell	So
DL	54	JaMarcus Whyce	Fr
DL	56	DD Holmes	So
DL	57	Bryce Jenkins	So
DL	58	Joshua Simmons	So
DL	88	Derrick LeBlanc	Jr
DL	90	Delmar White	Fr
DL	95	Armon Parker	Sr
DL	96	Jayvon Parker	Sr
DL	98	Eyan Thomas	Jr
DL	99	Lavon Johnson	Sr

Special teams

Pos.	#	Name	Class
P	34	Bryce McFerson	Sr
K	36	Sean O'Haire	So
P	43	Philip Noyes	So
LS	59	Rory Knipp	Fr
K	86	Eli Fulcher	Fr
LS	97	Luke O'Hare	Fr
K	98	Daniel Leahy	Fr

Head coach

- Aazaar Abdul–Rahim (interim)

Coordinators/assistant coaches

- Ted Monachino – Defensive coordinator/outside linebackers
- Clint Trickett – Offensive coordinator/quarterbacks
- Aazaar Abdul-Rahim – Co-defensive coordinator/associate head coach for defense/cornerbacks/Interim Head Coach
- Matt Barnes – Special teams coordinator
- Andre Powell – Running backs
- Latrell Scott – Wide receivers
- James Thomas Jr. – Safeties
- Zac Spavital – Inside linebackers
- Damian Wroblewski – Offensive linemen
- Randy Starks – Defensive line
- Kyle Schmidt – Tight ends
- Pep Hamilton – Special assistant to the head coach
- Hal Hunter – Senior offensive assistant

Legend

- (C) Team captain
- (S) Suspended
- (I) Ineligible
- Injured
- Redshirt

Roster
Last update: 2026-06-14
