= 2025 Maryland Terrapins football team =

American college football season

2025 Maryland Terrapins football
- Conference: Big Ten Conference
- Record: 4–8 (1–8 Big Ten)
- Head coach: Mike Locksley (7th season)
- Offensive coordinator: Pep Hamilton (1st season)
- Offensive scheme: West Coast
- Defensive coordinator: Ted Monachino (1st season)
- Co-defensive coordinator: Aazaar Abdul-Rahim (2nd season)
- Base defense: 3–4
- Home stadium: SECU Stadium

2025 Big Ten Conference football standings
	Conf.			Overall
Team	W		L	W		L
No. 1 Indiana y$#^	9	–	0	16	–	0
No. 5 Ohio State y^	9	–	0	12	–	2
No. 4 Oregon ^	8	–	1	13	–	2
No. 21 Michigan	7	–	2	9	–	4
No. 20 USC	7	–	2	9	–	4
No. 17 Iowa	6	–	3	9	–	4
Illinois	5	–	4	9	–	4
Washington	5	–	4	9	–	4
Minnesota	5	–	4	8	–	5
Nebraska	4	–	5	7	–	6
Northwestern	4	–	5	7	–	6
Penn State	3	–	6	7	–	6
UCLA	3	–	6	3	–	9
Rutgers	2	–	7	5	–	7
Wisconsin	2	–	7	4	–	8
Maryland	1	–	8	4	–	8
Michigan State	1	–	8	4	–	8
Purdue	0	–	9	2	–	10
Championship: Indiana 13, Ohio State 10
# – College Football Playoff champion; ^ – College Football Playoff participant; $ – Conference champion; y – Championship game participant; As of October 20, 2026; Rankings from AP Poll

The 2025 Maryland Terrapins football team represented the University of Maryland, College Park in the Big Ten Conference during the 2025 NCAA Division I FBS football season. The Terrapins were led by Mike Locksley in his seventh year as head coach. The Terrapins played their home games at SECU Stadium in College Park, Maryland.

== Transfers ==
Incoming

Name	Pos.	Height	Weight	Hometown	Prev. school
Kaleb Webb	WR	6'3"	204 lbs	Powder Springs, GA	Tennessee
Jalil Farooq	WR	6'1"	208 lbs	Upper Marlboro, MD	Oklahoma
Jayvin James	OT	6'4"	255 lbs	Pompano Beach, FL	Akron
Dorian Fleming	TE	6'3"	234 lbs	Colonial Heights, VA	Georgia State
Dontay Joyner	CB	5'11"	170 lbs	Lakeland, FL	Arkansas State
Justyn Martin	QB	6'2"	201 lbs	Inglewood, CA	UCLA
Jamare Glasker	CB	6'1"	185 lbs	Oxon Hill, MD	Wake Forest
Eyan Thomas	DL	6'4"	336 lbs	Marcus Hook, PA	Saint Francis (PA)
DD Holmes	EDGE	6'6"	240 lbs	Washington, D.C.	Florida State
Rahtrel Perry	OT	6'7"	323 lbs	New London, CT	Central Connecticut
Cam Rice	DL	6'2"	230 lbs	Morgantown, WV	Ohio
Joel Starlings	DL	6'5"	310 lbs	Richmond, VA	North Carolina
Sedrick Smith	DL	6'4"	310 lbs	Atlanta, GA	Alabama A&M
Jordan Scott	WR	6'7"	215 lbs	Lynchburg, VA	Florida State
Gavin Edwards	S	6'0"	180 lbs	St. Stephen, SC	Austin Peay
Sean O'Haire	K	6'2"	188 lbs	Kildare, Ireland	Richmond
Carlos Moore Jr.	OT	6'6"	302 lbs	Bowie, MD	Elon
EJ Moore Jr.	DL	6'2"	292 lbs	Decatur, GA	Western Carolina

Outgoing

Name	Pos.	Height	Weight	Hometown	New school
Leron Husbands	TE	6'3"	237 lbs	Washington, DC	Tulane
Brenden Segovia	P	6'2"	185 lbs	Westlake Village, CA	TBA
Cameron Edge	QB	6'1"	205 lbs	Smyrna, DE	Eastern Michigan
Brandon Jacob	S	6'1.5"	170 lbs	Orlando, FL	UCF
Ezekiel Avit	WR	6'3"	180 lbs	Potomac, MD	Fresno State
Perry Fisher	CB	6'2"	185 lbs	Tallahassee, FL	UAB
Lionell Whitaker	CB	5'11"	194 lbs	Tallahassee, FL	Coastal Carolina
Kyle Long	OT	6'6"	300 lbs	Florissant, MO	East Carolina
Kevis Thomas	CB	6'0"	180 lbs	Perry, FL	Kentucky
Chantz Harley	CB	6'1"	175 lbs	Bethesda, MD	James Madison
Jonathan Akins	CB	5'11"	170 lbs	Madison, FL	East Carolina
Billy Edwards Jr.	QB	6'2"	210 lbs	Burtonsville, MD	Wisconsin
Tayvon Nelson	CB	6'2"	187 lbs	Staten Island, NY	Marshall
Preston Howard	TE	6'5"	240 lbs	Baltimore, MD	Auburn
Alec Hughes	WR	6'1"	201 lbs	Round Hill, VA	Fordham
Josh Richards	WR	6'1"	190 lbs	Sicklerville, NJ	Arkansas–Pine Bluff
Roman Hemby	RB	6'0"	208 lbs	Bel Air, MD	Indiana
Jaiden Fair	WR	5'8"	168 lbs	Stafford, VA	Richmond
Khalid Jones	WR	6'1"	175 lbs	Baltimore, MD	TBA
DeAndre Duffus	OL	6'4"	330 lbs	Fort Lauderdale, FL	Georgia State
Kevin Kalonji	OT	6'5"	327 lbs	Silver Spring, MD	Sam Houston
Marcus Dumervil	OT	6'5"	310 lbs	Fort Lauderdale, FL	Arkansas
Dylan Wade	TE	6'2"	226 lbs	Orlando, FL	UCF
Parker Jones	WR	6'2"	216 lbs	Baltimore, MD	TBA
MJ Morris	QB	6'1"	209 lbs	Carrollton, GA	Coastal Carolina
Braeden Wisloski	WR	5'9"	184 lbs	Catawissa, PA	James Madison
Terez Davis	OT	6'7"	260 lbs	Hyattsville, MD	Ole Miss
Tamarus Walker	IOL	6'3"	315 lbs	Owings Mills, MD	UConn
Dylan Gooden	LB	6'4.5"	196 lbs	Olney, MD	Sacramento State
Kellen Wyatt	EDGE	6'2"	212 lbs	Severn, MD	Indiana
Lavon Johnson	DL	6'3"	295 lbs	Allentown, PA	Texas
Jayvin James	OT	6'4"	255 lbs	Pompano Beach, FL	Mississippi State
Robert Long	QB	6'0"	204 lbs	Fairfield, CT	TBA
Caleb Wheatland	LB	6'1"	226 lbs	Chantilly, VA	Auburn
Jayden Sauray	QB	5'11"	220 lbs	Upper Marlboro, MD	TBA
Andre Roye	OT	6'5"	322 lbs	Baltimore, MD	Colorado
Jack Howes	K	6'1"	205 lbs	Orlando, FL	Buffalo
Billy Molloy	OL	6'6"	296 lbs	Washington, D.C.	Holy Cross

== NFL draft ==
Round	Pick	Player	Position	NFL Club
3	102	Tai Felton	WR	Minnesota Vikings
4	132	Ruben Hyppolite II	LB	Chicago Bears
5	143	Jordan Phillips	DL	Miami Dolphins
5	155	Dante Trader Jr.	S	Miami Dolphins
7	240	Kaden Prather	WR	Buffalo Bills
7	247	Tommy Akingbesote	DT	Dallas Cowboys

== Schedule ==
Date	Time	Opponent	Site	TV	Result	Attendance
August 30	12:00 p.m.	Florida Atlantic*	SECU Stadium; College Park, MD	BTN	W 39–7	35,067
September 5	7:30 p.m.	Northern Illinois*	SECU Stadium; College Park, MD	BTN	W 20–9	35,331
September 13	12:00 p.m.	Towson*	SECU Stadium; College Park, MD	Peacock	W 44–17	36,780
September 20	12:00 p.m.	at Wisconsin	Camp Randall Stadium; Madison, WI	NBC	W 27–10	68,547
October 4	3:30 p.m.	Washington	SECU Stadium; College Park, MD	BTN	L 20–24	46,185
October 11	3:30 p.m.	Nebraska	SECU Stadium; College Park, MD	BTN	L 31–34	39,623
October 18	7:00 p.m.	at UCLA	Rose Bowl; Pasadena, CA	FS1	L 17–20	35,561
November 1	3:30 p.m.	No. 2 Indiana^{†}	SECU Stadium; College Park, MD	CBS	L 10–55	46,185
November 8	2:30 p.m.	at Rutgers	SHI Stadium; Piscataway, NJ (rivalry)	FS1	L 20–35	41,032
November 15	3:30 p.m.	at Illinois	Gies Memorial Stadium; Champaign, IL	FS1	L 6–24	56,416
November 22	4:00 p.m.	No. 18 Michigan	SECU Stadium; College Park, MD	BTN	L 20–45	46,185
November 29	7:00 p.m.	vs. Michigan State	Ford Field; Detroit, MI	FS1	L 28–38	30,317
*Non-conference game; ^{†}Homecoming; Rankings from AP Poll (and CFP Rankings, after November 4) - Released prior to game; All times are in Eastern time; Source:

== Game summaries ==
=== vs Florida Atlantic ===
Florida Atlantic Owls (0–0) at Maryland Terrapins (0–0) – Game summary

Quarter	1	2	3	4	Total
Owls	7	0	0	0	7
Terrapins	7	26	6	0	39

at SECU Stadium • College Park, Maryland

- Date: August 30
- Game time: 12:00 p.m.
- Game weather:
- Game attendance: 35,067
- Referee: Rick Warne
- TV announcers (BTN): Joe Beninati (play-by-play), Matt Millen (analyst), and Michella Chester (sideline)

Game information

First quarter

- MD – Daniel Wingate 20-yard interception return (Sean O'Haire kick), 6:38. Terrapins 7–0.
- FAU – Asaad Waseem 27-yard pass from Caden Veltkamp (Garrison Smith kick), 4:59. Tied 7–7. Drive: 5 plays, 58 yards, 1:32.

Second quarter

- MD – Sean O'Haire 49-yard field goal, 14:01. Terrapins 10–7. Drive: 6 plays, 24 yards, 1:29.
- MD – Team Safety, 10:42. Terrapins 12–7.
- MD – Shaleak Knotts 29-yard pass from Malik Washington (Sean O'Haire kick), 7:51. Terrapins 19–7. Drive: 6 plays, 50 yards, 2:51.
- MD – Kaleb Webb 29-yard pass from Malik Washington (Sean O'Haire kick), 3:17. Terrapins 26–7. Drive: 7 plays, 57 yards, 3:05.
- MD – Dorian Fleming 9-yard pass from Malik Washington (Sean O'Haire kick), 0:37. Terrapins 33–7. Drive: 8 plays, 67 yards, 1:14.

Third quarter

- MD – Sean O'Haire 24-yard field goal, 11:13. Terrapins 36–7. Drive: 9 plays, 69 yards, 3:43.
- MD – Sean O'Haire 42-yard field goal, 8:30. Terrapins 39–7. Drive: 5 plays, 16 yards, 1:32.

Fourth quarter

- No scoring plays.

Statistics	FAU	MD
First downs	23	22
Plays–yards	98–354	77–380
Rushes–yards	32–77	30–112
Passing yards	277	268
Passing: Comp–Att–Int	36–62–6	28–47–0
Turnovers	6	0
Time of possession	30:26	29:34

Team	Category	Player	Statistics
Florida Atlantic	Passing	Caden Veltkamp	30/49, 228 yards, TD, 4 INT
Florida Atlantic	Rushing	Gemari Sands	9 carries, 44 yards
Florida Atlantic	Receiving	Easton Messner	15 receptions, 87 yards
Maryland	Passing	Malik Washington	27/43, 258 yards, 3 TD
Maryland	Rushing	DeJuan Williams	10 carries, 54 yards
Maryland	Receiving	Shaleak Knotts	5 receptions, 59 yards, TD

=== vs Northern Illinois ===
Northern Illinois Huskies (1–0) at Maryland Terrapins (1–0) – Game summary

Quarter	1	2	3	4	Total
Huskies	0	3	6	0	9
Terrapins	3	7	3	7	20

at SECU Stadium • College Park, Maryland

- Date: September 5
- Game time: 7:30 p.m.
- Game weather:
- Game attendance: 35,331
- Referee: Matthew Richards
- TV announcers (BTN): Joe Beninati (play-by-play), Matt Millen (color analyst) and Kylen Mills (sideline)

Game information

First quarter

- MD – Sean O'Haire 36-yard field goal, 4:30. Terrapins 3–0. Drive: 8 plays, 62 yards, 2:57.

Second quarter

MD – Dorian Fleming 12-yard pass from Malik Washington (Sean O'Haire kick), 8:46. Terrapins 10–0. Drive: 6 plays, 47 yards, 2:51.

- NIU – Andrew Glass 20-yard field goal, 0:03. Terrapins 10–3. Drive: 19 plays, 75 yards, 8:37.

Third quarter

- MD – Sean O'Haire 29-yard field goal, 7:52. Terrapins 13–3. Drive: 12 plays, 56 yards, 5:09.
- NIU – Telly Johnson Jr. 74-yard run (pass failed), 6:22. Terrapins 13–9. Drive: 3 plays, 73 yards, 1:25.

Fourth quarter

- MD – Shaleak Knotts 42-yard pass from Malik Washington (Sean O'Haire kick), 9:20. Terrapins 20–9. Drive: 6 plays, 77 yards, 3:00.

Statistics	NIU	MD
First downs	13	20
Plays–yards	70–271	64–340
Rushes–yards	48–180	28–86
Passing yards	91	254
Passing: comp–att–int	14–22–0	19–36–0
Turnovers	0	1
Time of possession	33:35	26:25

Team	Category	Player	Statistics
Northern Illinois	Passing	Josh Holst	14/22, 91 yards
Northern Illinois	Rushing	Chavon Wright	27 carries, 90 yards
Northern Illinois	Receiving	Gary Givens	2 receptions, 26 yards
Maryland	Passing	Malik Washington	19/35, 254 yards, 2 TD
Maryland	Rushing	Nolan Ray	11 carries, 50 yards
Maryland	Receiving	Dorian Fleming	4 receptions, 70 yards, TD

=== vs Towson (FCS) ===
Towson Tigers (FCS) (2–0) at Maryland Terrapins (2–0) – Game summary

Quarter	1	2	3	4	Total
Tigers (FCS)	0	0	7	10	17
Terrapins	17	17	7	3	44

at SECU Stadium • College Park, Maryland

- Date: September 13
- Game time: 12:00 p.m.
- Game weather: Sunny • Temperature: 77 °F (25 °C) • Wind: SW at 3 miles per hour (4.8 km/h)
- Game attendance: 36,780
- Referee: David Siegle
- TV announcers (Peacock): Michael Grady (play-by-play), Michael Robinson (analyst) and Caroline Pineda (sideline)

Game information

First quarter

- (11:43) MD – Sean O'Haire 37-yard field goal (Drive: 5 plays, 14 yards, 1:42; Maryland 3–0)
- (8:11) MD – DeJuan Williams 2-yard run, Sean O'Haire kick (Drive: 5 plays, 73 yards, 2:18; Maryland 10–0)
- (3:14) MD – Malik Washington 2-yard run, Sean O'Haire kick (Drive: 7 plays, 78 yards, 3:24; Maryland 17–0)

Second quarter

- (12:24) MD – Shaleak Knotts 32-yard pass from Malik Washington, Sean O'Haire kick (Drive: 6 plays, 73 yards, 2:25; Maryland 24–0)
- (10:45) MD – Nolan Ray 5-yard run, Sean O'Haire kick (Drive: 4 plays, 25 yards, 1:39; Maryland 31–0)
- (0:00) MD – Sean O'Haire 39-yard field goal (Drive: 14 plays, 67 yards, 6:28; Maryland 34–0)

Third quarter

- (11:51) MD – La'khi Roland 100-yard interception, Sean O'Haire kick (Maryland 41–0)
- (5:42) TOW – Lukkas Londono 19-yard pass from Andrew Indorf, Caden Williams kick (Drive: 3 plays, 75 yards, 1:06; Maryland 41–7)

Fourth quarter

- (11:27) MD – Sean O'Haire 28-yard field goal (Drive: 4 plays, 5 yards, 1:25; Maryland 44–7)
- (11:11) TOW – Jaceon Doss 84-yard pass from Nathan Kent, Caden Williams kick (Drive: 1 play, 84 yards, 0:12; Maryland 44–14)
- (6:13) TOW – Caden Williams 29-yard field goal (Drive: 6 plays, 50 yards, 2:47; Maryland 44–17)

Statistics	TOW	MD
First downs	14	21
Plays–yards	55–281	71–428
Rushes–yards	26–51	42–152
Passing yards	230	276
Passing: comp–att–int	14–29–1	21–29–1
Turnovers	2	1
Time of possession	23:54	36:06

Team	Category	Player	Statistics
Towson	Passing	Andrew Indorf	12/25, 145 yards, TD, INT
Towson	Rushing	Kemarrion Battles	7 carries, 17 yards
Towson	Receiving	Jaceon Doss	1 reception, 84 yards, TD
Maryland	Passing	Malik Washington	16/22, 261 yards, TD, INT
Maryland	Rushing	Iverson Howard	15 carries, 60 yards
Maryland	Receiving	Octavian Smith Jr.	4 receptions, 103 yards

=== at Wisconsin ===
Maryland Terrapins (3–0) at Wisconsin Badgers (2–1) – Game summary

Quarter	1	2	3	4	Total
Terrapins	7	13	0	7	27
Badgers	0	0	3	7	10

at Camp Randall Stadium • Madison, Wisconsin

- Date: September 20
- Game time: 12:00 p.m.
- Game weather: Sunny, 70 °F (21 °C); Wind: S 6 mph
- Game attendance: 68,547
- Referee: Francisco Villar
- TV announcers (NBC): Paul Burmeister (play-by-play), Yogi Roth (analyst), and Caroline Pineda (sideline)

Game information

First quarter

- MD – Malik Washington 1-yard run (Sean O'Haire kick), 6:22 Maryland 7–0 Drive: 2 plays, 4 yards, 0:33.

Second quarter

- MD – Shaleak Knotts 9-yard pass from Malik Washington (Sean O'Haire kick), 13:41 Maryland 14–0 Drive: 5 plays, 28 yards, 1:24.
- MD – Sean O'Haire 49-yard field goal, 3:38. Maryland 17–0. Drive: 8 plays, 39 yards, 2:46.
- MD – Sean O'Haire 26-yard field goal, 0:00. Maryland 20–0. Drive: 5 plays, 57 yards, 0:25.

Third quarter

- WIS – Nathanial Vakos 33-yard field goal, 10:12. Maryland 20–3. Drive: 8 plays, 31 yards, 3:23.

Fourth quarter

- MD – Shaleak Knotts 62-yard pass from Malik Washington (Sean O'Haire kick), 9:03 Maryland 27–3 Drive: 6 plays, 99 yards, 3:22.
- WIS – Lance Mason 13-yard pass from Hunter Simmons (Nathanial Vakos kick), 0:28 Maryland 27–10 Drive: 10 plays, 80 yards, 2:44.

Statistics	MD	WIS
First downs	13	21
Plays–yards	57–326	77–296
Rushes–yards	23–61	42–61
Passing yards	265	235
Passing: comp–att–int	18–34–0	22–35–1
Turnovers	0	1
Time of possession	22:53	37:07

Team	Category	Player	Statistics
Maryland	Passing	Malik Washington	18/34, 265 yards, 2 TD
Maryland	Rushing	DeJaun Williams	15 carries, 62 yards
Maryland	Receiving	Shaleak Knotts	3 receptions, 80 yards, 2 TD
Wisconsin	Passing	Hunter Simmons	7/9, 70 yards, TD
Wisconsin	Rushing	Darrion Dupree	14 carries, 52 yards
Wisconsin	Receiving	Trech Kekahuna	5 receptions, 77 yards

=== vs Washington ===
Washington Huskies (3–1) at Maryland Terrapins (4–0) – Game summary

Quarter	1	2	3	4	Total
Huskies	0	0	3	21	24
Terrapins	10	3	7	0	20

at SECU Stadium • College Park, Maryland

- Date: October 4
- Game time: 3:30 p.m.
- Game weather: Sunny • Temperature: 77 °F (25 °C) • Wind: SW at 3 miles per hour (4.8 km/h)
- Game attendance: 46,185
- Referee: Bryan Banks
- TV announcers (BTN): Guy Haberman (play-by-play), Jake Butt (analyst) and Brooke Fletcher (sideline)

Game information

First quarter

- (11:22) MD – Sean O'Haire 26-yard field goal (Drive: 4 plays, 5 yards, 0:54; Maryland 3–0)
- (0:20) MD – Malik Washington 4-yard run, Sean O'Haire kick (Drive: 16 plays, 71 yards, 8:09; Maryland 10–0)

Second quarter

- (4:01) MD – Sean O'Haire 29-yard field goal (Drive: 16 plays, 57 yards, 8:03; Maryland 13–0)

Third quarter

- (11:25) MD – AJ Szymanski 2-yard pass from Malik Washington, Sean O'Haire kick (Drive: 9 plays, 75 yards, 3:35; Maryland 20–0)
- (3:44) WASH – Grady Gross 36-yard field goal (Drive: 16 plays, 55 yards, 7:37; Maryland 20–3)

Fourth quarter

- (14:23) WASH – Denzel Boston 3-yard pass from Demond Williams Jr., Grady Gross kick (Drive: 9 plays, 74 yards, 3:01; Maryland 20–10)
- (11:32) WASH – Dezmen Roebuck 34-yard pass from Demond Williams Jr., Grady Gross kick (Drive: 4 plays, 75 yards, 1:19; Maryland 20–17)
- (3:21) WASH – Jonah Coleman 1-yard run, Grady Gross kick (Drive: 11 plays, 80 yards, 5:17; Washington 24–20)

Statistics	WASH	MD
First downs	28	19
Plays–yards	77–390	69–274
Rushes–yards	36–115	20–55
Passing yards	275	219
Passing: comp–att–int	28–41–1	30–49–1
Turnovers	1	1
Time of possession	30:59	29:01

Team	Category	Player	Statistics
Washington	Passing	Demond Williams Jr.	28/41, 275 yards, 2 TD, INT
Washington	Rushing	Jonah Coleman	18 carries, 57 yards, TD
Washington	Receiving	Denzel Boston	6 receptions, 71 yards, TD
Maryland	Passing	Malik Washington	30/49, 219 yards, TD, INT
Maryland	Rushing	DeJuan Williams	12 carries, 26 yards
Maryland	Receiving	Octavian Smith Jr.	3 receptions, 57 yards

=== vs Nebraska ===
Nebraska Cornhuskers (4–1) at Maryland Terrapins (4–1) – Game summary

Quarter	1	2	3	4	Total
Cornhuskers	7	17	0	10	34
Terrapins	0	17	14	0	31

at SECU Stadium • College Park, Maryland

- Date: October 11
- Game time: 3:30 p.m.
- Game weather: Sunny, 71 degrees, Wind NE @ 9 mph
- Game attendance: 39,623
- Referee: Jason Nickleby
- TV announcers (BTN): Guy Haberman (play-by-play), Jake Butt (analyst) and Brooke Fletcher (sideline)

Game information

First Quarter

- (7:15) NEB – Nyziah Hunter 64-yard pass from Dylan Raiola, Kyle Cunanan kick (Drive: 1 plays, 64 yards, 0:12, Nebraska 7-0)

Second Quarter

- (14:55) NEB – Kyle Cunanan 43-yard field goal (Drive: 10 plays, 47 yards, 5:43, Nebraska 10-0)
- (11:32) MD - Nolan Ray 28-yard run, Sean O'Haire kick (Drive: 8 plays, 75 yards, 3:23. Nebraska 10-7)
- (8:25) MD - Leon Haughton Jr. 21-yard pass from Malik Washington, Sean O'Haire kick (Drive: 4 plays, 33 yards, 2:20, Maryland 14-10)
- (7:27) NEB - Luke Lindenmeyer 7-yard pass from Dylan Raiola, Kyle Cunanan kick (Drive: 2 plays, 10 yards, 0:46, Nebraska 17-14)
- (5:37) NEB - Nyziah Hunter 12-yard pass from Dylan Raiola, Kyle Cunanan kick (Drive: 3 plays, 46 yards, 0:53, Nebraska 24-14)
- (0:24) MD - Sean O'Haire 37-yard field goal (Drive: 13 plays, 66 yards, 3:00, Nebraska 24-17)

Third Quarter

- (9:58) MD - DeJuan Williams 1-yard run, Sean O'Haire kick (Drive: 10 plays, 75 yards, 4:58, 24-24)
- (6:40) MD - Dontay Joyner 67-yard interception return, Sean O'Haire kick (Drive: 3:18, Maryland 31-24)

Fourth Quarter

- (7:47) NEB - Kyle Cunanan 27-yard field goal (Drive: 12 plays, 83 yards, 6:15, Maryland 31-27)
- (1:08) NEB - Dane Key 3-yard pass from Dylan Raiola, Kyle Cunanan kick (Drive: 7 plays, 81 yards, 2:34, Nebraska 34-31)

Statistics	NEB	MD
First downs	23	18
Plays–yards	59–453	67–379
Rushes–yards	30–193	30–130
Passing yards	260	249
Passing: comp–att–int	20–29–3	27–37–0
Turnovers	3	0
Time of possession	28:33	31:27

Team	Category	Player	Statistics
Nebraska	Passing	Dylan Raiola	20/29, 260 yards, 4 TD, 3 INT
Nebraska	Rushing	Emmett Johnson	21 carries, 176 yards
Nebraska	Receiving	Nyziah Hunter	5 receptions, 125 yards, 2 TD
Maryland	Passing	Malik Washington	27/37, 249 yards, TD
Maryland	Rushing	Nolan Ray	11 carries, 62 yards, TD
Maryland	Receiving	Shaleak Knotts	5 receptions, 62 yards

=== at UCLA ===
Maryland Terrapins (4–2) at UCLA Bruins (2–4) – Game summary

Quarter	1	2	3	4	Total
Terrapins	0	3	7	7	17
Bruins	0	7	0	13	20

at Rose Bowl • Pasadena, California

- Date: October 18
- Game time: 7:05 p.m.
- Game weather: Sunny • Temperature: 83 °F (28 °C) • Wind: SW at 5 miles per hour (8.0 km/h)
- Game attendance: 35,561
- Referee: Tim O'Dey
- TV announcers (FS1): Noah Reed (play-by-play) and Robert Smith (analyst)
- ESPN box score

Game information

First quarter

- No scoring plays.

Second quarter

- (14:11) MD – Sean O'Haire 24-yard field goal (Drive: 17 plays, 88 yards, 8:09; Maryland 3–0)
- (12:05) UCLA – Anthony Frias II 55-yard run, Mateen Bhaghani kick (Drive: 4 plays, 71 yards, 2:03; UCLA 7–3)

Third quarter

- (4:40) MD – Jamare Glasker 8-yard interception return, Ryan Capriotti kick (Drive: 0:33; Maryland 10–7)

Fourth quarter

- (3:33) UCLA – Mikey Matthews 14-yard pass from Nico Iamaleava, Mateen Bhaghani kick (Drive: 8 plays, 80 yards, 2:06; UCLA 14–10)
- (2:04) UCLA – Mateen Bhaghani 42-yard field goal (Drive: 4 plays, −4 yards, 0:52; UCLA 17–10)
- (0:40) MD – Jalil Farooq 8-yard pass from Malik Washington, Ryan Capriotti kick (Drive: 9 plays, 75 yards, 1:24; Tie 17–17)
- (0:02) UCLA – Mateen Bhaghani 23-yard field goal (Drive: 5 plays, 68 yards, 0:33; UCLA 20–17)

Statistics	MD	UCLA
First downs	17	21
Plays–yards	74–337	70–414
Rushes–yards	26–127	35–193
Passing yards	210	221
Passing: comp–att–int	23–48–1	21–35–2
Turnovers	2	3
Time of possession	27:00	33:00

Team	Category	Player	Statistics
Maryland	Passing	Malik Washington	23/48, 210 yards, TD, INT
Maryland	Rushing	Malik Washington	6 carries, 67 yards
Maryland	Receiving	DeJuan Williams	7 receptions, 86 yards
UCLA	Passing	Nico Iamaleava	21/35, 221 yards, TD, 2 INT
UCLA	Rushing	Anthony Frias II	4 carries, 97 yards, TD
UCLA	Receiving	Titus Mokiao-Atimalala	6 receptions, 102 yards

=== vs No. 2 Indiana ===
No. 2 Indiana Hoosiers (8–0) at Maryland Terrapins (4–3) – Game summary

Quarter	1	2	3	4	Total
No. 2 Hoosiers	7	13	21	14	55
Terrapins	3	0	7	0	10

at SECU Stadium • College Park, Maryland

- Date: November 1
- Game time: 3:30 p.m.
- Game weather: Cloudy
- Game attendance: 46,185
- Referee: Jeff Servinski
- TV announcers (CBS): Brad Nessler (play-by-play), Gary Danielson (analyst), and Jenny Dell (sideline reporter)

Game information

First quarter

- MD – Sean O'Haire 24-yard field goal, 12:01. Terrapins 3–0. 4 plays, 6 yards, 1:35.
- IU – Fernando Mendoza 1-yard run (Nico Radicic kick), 2:11. Hoosiers 7–3. 13 plays, 93 yards, 6:42.

Second quarter

- IU – Nico Radicic 20-yard field goal, 10:30. Hoosiers 10-3. 8 plays, 76 yards, 4:25.
- IU – Omar Cooper Jr. 22-yard pass from Fernando Mendoza (Nico Radicic kick), 4:53. Hoosiers 17–3. 9 plays, 84 yards, 4:40.
- IU – Nico Radicic 46-yard field goal, 00:40. Hoosiers 20–3. 10 plays, 43 yards, 2:15.

Third quarter

- MD – DeJuan Williams 55-yard pass from Malik Washington (Sean O'Haire kick), 12:54. Hoosiers 20–10. 4 plays, 75 yards, 2:06.
- IU – Kaelon Black 31-yard run (Nico Radicic kick), 9:43. Hoosiers 27–10. 6 plays, 63 yards, 3:07.
- IU – Devan Boykin 32-yard fumble recovery (Nico Radicic kick), 8:41. Hoosiers 34–10.
- IU – Roman Hemby 16-yard run (Nico Radicic kick), 7:37. Hoosiers 41–10. 2 plays, 24 yards, 00:52.

Fourth quarter

- IU – Jonathan Brady 6-yard pass from Alberto Mendoza (Nico Radicic kick), 11:22. Hoosiers 48–10. 13 plays, 95 yards, 8:20.
- IU – Khobie Martin 1-yard run (Nico Radicic kick), 3:08. Hoosiers 55–10. 8 plays, 93 yards, 5:34.

Statistics	IU	MD
First downs	28	11
Plays–yards	75–588	50–293
Rushes–yards	52–367	17–37
Passing yards	221	256
Passing: comp–att–int	16–23–1	18–33–2
Turnovers	1	5
Time of possession	40:22	19:38

Team	Category	Player	Statistics
Indiana	Passing	Fernando Mendoza	14/21, 201 yards, TD, INT
Indiana	Rushing	Kaelon Black	14 carries, 110 yards, TD
Indiana	Receiving	Omar Cooper Jr.	7 receptions, 86 yards, TD
Maryland	Passing	Malik Washington	16/31, 242 yards, TD, 2 INT
Maryland	Rushing	Iverson Howard	4 carries, 12 yards
Maryland	Receiving	DeJuan Williams	4 receptions, 78 yards, TD

=== at Rutgers ===
Maryland Terrapins (4–4) at Rutgers Scarlet Knights (4–5) – Game summary

Quarter	1	2	3	4	Total
Terrapins	7	10	0	3	20
Scarlet Knights	0	21	7	7	35

at SHI Stadium • Piscataway, New Jersey

- Date: November 8
- Game time: 2:30 p.m.
- Game weather: Sunny • Temperature: 66 °F (19 °C) • Wind: NW at 7 miles per hour (11 km/h)
- Game attendance: 41,032
- Referee: Tim O'Dey
- TV announcers (FS1): Noah Reed (play-by-play) and Robert Smith (analyst)

Game information

First quarter

- (14:23) MD – Malik Washington 73-yard run, Sean O'Haire kick (Drive: 2 plays, 75 yards, 0:37; Maryland 7-0)

Second quarter

- (11:56) RUTG – DT Sheffield 9-yard pass from Athan Kaliakmanis, Jai Patel kick (Drive: 7 plays, 53 yards, 3:23; 7-7)
- (5:53) MD – Sean O'Haire 27-yard field goal (Drive: 10 plays, 71 yards, 5:58; Maryland 10-7)
- (4:14) RUTG – Ian Strong 45-yard pass from Athan Kaliakmanis, Jai Patel kick (Drive: 3 plays, 75 yards, 1:38; Rutgers 14-10)
- (3:08) MD – Kaleb Webb 21-yard pass from Malik Washington, Sean O'Haire kick (Drive: 3 plays, 80 yards, 1:00; Maryland 17-14)
- (0:34) RUTG – Ian Strong 5-yard pass from Athan Kaliakmanis, Jai Patel kick (Drive: 10 plays, 75 yards, 2:34; Rutgers 21-17)

Third quarter

- (10:26) RUTG – Ian Strong 14-yard pass from Athan Kaliakmanis, Jai Patel kick (Drive: 8 plays, 75 yards, 4:34; Rutgers 28-17)

Fourth quarter

- (13:34) MD – Sean O'Haire 44-yard field goal (Drive: 8 plays, 75 yards, 4:34; Rutgers 28-17)
- (4:10) RUTG – Antwan Raymond 5-yard run, Jai Patel kick (Drive: 9 plays, 66 yards, 5:24; Rutgers 35-20)

Statistics	MD	RUTG
First downs	14	25
Plays–yards	57–403	69–485
Rushes–yards	29–305	49–256
Passing yards	98	229
Passing: comp–att–int	15-28-1	13-20-2
Turnovers	1	2
Time of possession	25:02	34:58

Team	Category	Player	Statistics
Maryland	Passing	Malik Washington	15/28, 98 yards, TD, INT
Maryland	Rushing	Malik Washington	8 carries, 164 yards, TD
Maryland	Receiving	Dorian Fleming	4 receptions, 39 yards
Rutgers	Passing	Athan Kaliakmanis	13/20, 229 yards, 4 TD, 2 INT
Rutgers	Rushing	Antwan Raymond	41 carries, 240 yards, TD
Rutgers	Receiving	Ian Strong	5 receptions, 88 yards, 3 TD

=== at Illinois ===
Maryland Terrapins (4–5) at Illinois Fighting Illini (6–3) – Game summary

Quarter	1	2	3	4	Total
Terrapins	3	3	0	0	6
Fighting Illini	7	7	7	3	24

at Gies Memorial Stadium • Champaign, Illinois

- Date: November 15
- Game time: 3:30 p.m.
- Game weather: Cloudy • Temperature: 72 °F (22 °C) • Wind: W at 17 miles per hour (27 km/h)
- Game attendance: 56,416
- Referee: Mark Kluczynski
- TV announcers (FS1): Noah Reed (play-by-play) and Robert Smith (analyst)

Game information

First quarter

- (9:15) MD – Sean O'Haire 29-yard field goal (Drive: 13 plays, 65 yards, 5:45; Maryland 3-0)
- (0:00) ILL – Hudson Clement 22-yard pass from Luke Altmyer, David Olano kick (Drive: 7 plays, 51 yards, 4:05; Illinois 7-3)

Second quarter

- (6:12) MD – Sean O'Haire 43-yard field goal (Drive: 5 plays, 29 yards, 1:44; Illinois 7-6)
- (1:38) ILL – Kaden Feagin 3-yard run, David Olano kick (Drive: 13 plays, 75 yards, 4:34; Illinois 14-6)

Third quarter

- (10:05) ILL – Hudson Clement 23-yard pass from Luke Altmyer, David Olano kick (Drive: 7 plays, 67 yards, 4:00; Illinois 21-6)

Fourth quarter

- (4:19) ILL – David Olano 33-yard field goal (Drive: 12 plays, 82 yards, 5:53; Illinois 24-6)

Statistics	MD	ILL
First downs	18	24
Plays–yards	64–293	72–397
Rushes–yards	18–55	48–225
Passing yards	238	172
Passing: comp–att–int	25–46–1	15–25–1
Turnovers	1	1
Time of possession	24:03	35:57

Team	Category	Player	Statistics
Maryland	Passing	Malik Washington	25/46, 238 yards, INT
Maryland	Rushing	DeJuan Williams	9 carries, 43 yards
Maryland	Receiving	Shaleak Knotts	4 receptions, 62 yards
Illinois	Passing	Luke Altmyer	15/25, 172 yards, 2 TD, INT
Illinois	Rushing	Kaden Feagin	14 carries, 81 yards, TD
Illinois	Receiving	Hudson Clement	3 receptions, 72 yards, 2 TD

=== vs No. 18 Michigan ===
No. 18 Michigan Wolverines (8–2) at Maryland Terrapins (4–6) – Game summary

Quarter	1	2	3	4	Total
No. 18 Wolverines	7	14	14	10	45
Terrapins	7	3	3	7	20

at SECU Stadium • College Park, Maryland

- Date: November 22
- Game time: 4:00 p.m. EST
- Game weather: 56 °F (13 °C), cloudy, NW 6 miles per hour (9.7 km/h)
- Game attendance: 46,185
- Referee: Gregory Blum
- TV announcers (BTN): Jeff Levering (play-by-play), Jake Butt (analyst) and Brooke Fletcher (sideline)

Game information

First quarter

- (10:28) MD – Dorian Fleming 1-yard pass from Malik Washington (Sean O'Haire kick) (Drive: 10 plays, 75 yards, 4:32; MD 7–0)
- (7:05) MICH – Andrew Marsh 12-yard pass from Bryce Underwood (Dominic Zvada kick) (Drive: 7 plays, 47 yards, 3:21; Tied 7–7)

Second quarter

- (14:17) MICH – Bryson Kuzdzal 2-yard run (Dominic Zvada kick) (Drive: 12 plays, 83 yards, 5:25; MICH 14–7)
- (12:28) MICH – Donaven McCulley 22-yard pass from Bryce Underwood (Dominic Zvada kick) (Drive: 3 plays, 23 yards, 1:09; MICH 21–7)
- (7:03) MD – Sean O'Haire 34-yard field goal (Drive: 12 plays, 59 yards, 5:25; MICH 21–10)

Third quarter

- (11:35) MICH – Bryson Kuzdzal 19-yard run (Dominic Zvada kick) (Drive: 8 plays, 65 yards, 3:25; MICH 28–10)
- (7:34) MD – Sean O'Haire 29-yard field goal (Drive: 12 plays, 64 yards, 4:01; MICH 28–13)
- (4:09) MICH – Bryson Kuzdzal 1-yard run (Dominic Zvada kick) (Drive: 7 plays, 47 yards, 3:16; MICH 35–13)

Fourth quarter

- (13:19) MICH – Jasper Parker 6-yard run (Dominic Zvada kick) (Drive: 6 plays, 37 yards, 2:37; MICH 42–13)
- (7:20) MICH – Dominic Zvada 46-yard field goal (Drive: 7 plays, 14 yards, 4:21; MICH 45–13)
- (5:55) MD – Jalil Farooq 0-yard pass from Khristian Martin (Sean O'Haire kick) (Drive: 4 plays, 75 yards, 1:24; MICH 45–20)

Statistics	MICH	MD
First downs	27	21
Plays–yards	73–443	68–347
Rushes–yards	50–228	25–71
Passing yards	215	276
Passing: comp–att–int	16–23–0	22–43–1
Turnovers	0	1
Time of possession	35:38	24:22

Team	Category	Player	Statistics
Michigan	Passing	Bryce Underwood	16/23, 215 yards, 2 TD
Michigan	Rushing	Bryson Kuzdzal	20 carries, 100 yards, 3 TD
Michigan	Receiving	Andrew Marsh	5 receptions, 76 yards, TD
Maryland	Passing	Malik Washington	19/39, 210 yards, TD, INT
Maryland	Rushing	DeJuan Williams	12 carries, 40 yards
Maryland	Receiving	Shaleak Knotts	4 receptions, 82 yards

=== at Michigan State ===
Maryland Terrapins (4-7) at Michigan State Spartans (3-8) – Game summary

Quarter	1	2	3	4	Total
Terrapins	0	7	21	0	28
Spartans	7	17	7	7	38

at Ford Field • Detroit, Michigan

- Date: November 29
- Game time: 7:00 p.m.
- Game weather: Indoor
- Game attendance: 30,317
- Referee: Francisco Villar
- TV announcers (FS1): Dan Hellie (play-by-play) and Petros Papadakis (analyst)

Game information

First quarter

- (9:45) MSU – Kai Rios 1-yard pass from Alessio Milivojevic, Martin Connington kick (Drive: 10 plays, 70 yards, 5:09; Michigan State 7-0)

Second quarter

- (12:26) MSU – Martin Connington 25-yard field goal (Drive: 7 plays, 76 yards, 2:57; Michigan State 10-0)
- (8:40) MSU – Nick Marsh 15-yard pass from Alessio Milivojevic, Martin Connington kick (Drive: 6 plays, 64 yards, 2:30; Michigan State 17-0)
- (5:43) MD – Jalil Farooq 7-yard pass from Malik Washington, Sean O'Haire kick (Drive: 8 plays, 75 yards, 2:57; Michigan State 17-7)
- (0:04) MSU – Jack Velling 9-yard pass from Alessio Milivojevic, Martin Connington kick (Drive: 8 plays, 75 yards, 0:55; Michigan State 24-7)

Third quarter

- (11:36) MD – DeJuan Williams 5-yard run, Sean O'Haire kick (Drive: 10 plays, 75 yards, 3:24; Michigan State 24-14)
- (6:26) MD – Shaleak Knotts 25-yard pass from Malik Washington, Sean O'Haire kick (Drive: 8 plays, 73 yards, 2:15; Michigan State 24-21)
- (6:12) MSU – Alante Brown 92-yard kickoff return, Martin Connington kick (Drive: 0 plays, 0 yards, 0:00; Michigan State 31-21)
- (5:06) MD – Jalil Farooq 24-yard pass from Malik Washington, Sean O'Haire kick (Drive: 4 plays, 75 yards, 1:06; Michigan State 31-28)

Fourth quarter

- (1:56) MSU – Omari Kelly 10-yard pass from Alessio Milivojevic, Martin Connington kick (Drive: 6 plays, 35 yards, 1:05; Michigan State 38-28)

Statistics	MD	MSU
First downs	26	24
Plays–yards	77–534	70–453
Rushes–yards	16–75	31–161
Passing yards	459	292
Passing: comp–att–int	38–61–1	27–39–1
Turnovers	1	1
Time of possession	28:06	31:54

Team	Category	Player	Statistics
Maryland	Passing	Malik Washington	38/61, 459 yards, 3 TD, INT
Maryland	Rushing	DeJuan Williams	5 carries, 52 yards, TD
Maryland	Receiving	Shaleak Knotts	8 receptions, 139 yards, TD
Michigan State	Passing	Alessio Milivojevic	27/39, 292 yards, 4 TD, INT
Michigan State	Rushing	Elijah Tau-Tolliver	13 carries, 95 yards
Michigan State	Receiving	Nick Marsh	7 receptions, 85 yards, TD

== Personnel ==
=== Roster ===
2025 Maryland Terrapins football team roster
Players
Coaches
Offense

Pos.	#	Name	Class
RB	0	DeJuan Williams	Fr
WR	1	Jalil Farooq	Sr
WR	4	Shaleak Knotts	Sr
WR	5	Octavian Smith Jr.	Sr
QB	6	Justyn Martin	Jr
QB	7	Malik Washington	Fr
WR	8	Mekhai White	Fr
TE	9	Dorian Fleming	So
WR	10	Zymear Smith	Fr
WR	11	Ryan Manning	So
QB	12	Khristian Martin	Fr
WR	14	Jordan Scott	Jr
QB	15	Jackson Hamilton	Fr
TE	16	Leon Haughton Jr.	Jr
RB	17	Josiah McLaurin	So
QB	18	Roman Jensen	Fr
RB	19	Bud Coombs	Fr
WR	21	Sean Williams	So
RB	24	Iverson Howard	Fr
RB	25	Nolan Ray	So
RB	27	Eli Mason	Jr
RB	29	Colin Reynolds	Fr
RB	45	Solomon Foye	Fr
RB	47	Elias Johnson	Fr
TE	48	Thomas McCluskey	So
OL	50	Trevor Szymanski	Fr
OL	51	Michael McMonigle	Fr
OL	54	Lamar Williams	Fr
OL	61	Michael Hershey	So
OL	66	Aliou Bah	Jr
OL	68	Carlos Moore	Jr
OL	69	Logan Bennett	Fr
OL	70	Jaylen Gilchrist	Fr
OL	71	Alan Herron	Sr
OL	72	Ben Beymer	Fr
OL	73	Davon Watkins	Fr
OL	74	Isaiah Wright	Sr
OL	75	Ryan Howerton	Fr
OL	76	Rahtrel Perry	Jr
OL	77	Amory Hills	Fr
OL	78	Anthony Robsock	Fr
WR	81	Jahmari Powell-Wonson	Fr
WR	83	Emerson Smith	Fr
WR	84	Kaleb Webb	Jr
TE	85	JT Taggart	Fr
WR	88	Justin DeVaughn	Fr
TE	89	AJ Szymanski	Jr

Defense

Pos.	#	Name	Class
LB	0	Neeo Avery	So
LB	1	Daniel Wingate	Jr
DB	2	Braydon Lee	Fr
LB	3	Trey Reddick	So
DB	4	Kevyn Humes	So
DB	6	Dontay Joyner	Jr
DB	7	Gavin Edwards	So
DL	9	Zahir Mathis	Fr
DL	10	Cam Rice	GS
DB	12	Jayden Shipps	Fr
DB	13	Lavain Scruggs	Jr
DB	14	Jamare Glasker	Jr
DB	15	Lloyd Irvin III	Fr
DB	18	Alex Moore	So
DB	21	Judah Jenkins	So
DB	22	Jalen Huskey	Sr
LB	23	Keyshawn Flowers	So
DB	25	Ricardo Cooper Jr.	So
DB	26	Shamar McIntosh	So
DB	27	La'khi Roland	So
DL	29	Sidney Stewart	Fr
LB	30	Travares Daniels II	Fr
LB	31	Michael Harris	Jr
LB	32	Carlton Smith	Fr
DB	33	Messiah Delhomme	Fr
LB	35	Keyari James	So
DB	37	Carson Petitbon	So
DB	38	Taylor Best	So
DL	39	Daniel Owens	Jr
DL	40	Nahsir Taylor	Fr
LB	42	DJ Samuels	Jr
DL	44	Joel Starlings	So
DL	46	Dillan Fontus	Jr
DB	47	Sebastian Antoine-Pompey	So
LB	48	Darius Grimes	So
LB	49	Chris Wells	So
DL	50	EJ Moore Jr.	So
DL	52	Samuel Adu	Jr
DL	53	Akindele Dare	Jr
LB	53	Kellen McConnell	Fr
DL	56	DD Holmes	Fr
DL	57	Bryce Jenkins	Fr
DL	58	Joshua Simmons	Fr
DL	64	Aaron Folivi	Jr
DL	87	Dante Recker	Fr
DL	90	Delmar White	Fr
DL	91	Sedrick Smith	So
DL	98	Eyan Thomas	So
DL	99	Dimitry Nicolas	Fr

Special teams

Pos.	#	Name	Class
P	34	Bryce McFerson	Jr
K	36	Sean O'Haire	Fr
P	43	Philip Noyes	Fr
K	46	Gavin Marshall	Jr
LS	96	Ethan Gough	Sr
LS	97	Luke O'Hare	Fr
K	98	Ryan Capriotti	So

Head coach

- Mike Locksley

Coordinators/assistant coaches

- Pep Hamilton – Offensive coordinator/quarterbacks
- Ted Monachino – Defensive coordinator/outside linebackers
- Andre Powell – Special teams coordinator
- Aazaar Abdul-Rahim – Co-defensive coordinator/associate head coach for defense/cornerbacks
- Latrell Scott – Wide receivers
- James Thomas Jr. – Safeties
- Zac Spavital – Inside linebackers
- Damian Wroblewski – Offensive linemen
- Louis Swaba – Running backs
- Corey Liuget – Defensive line
- Hal Hunter – Tackles/tight ends

Legend

- (C) Team captain
- (S) Suspended
- (I) Ineligible
- Injured
- Redshirt

Roster
Last update: 2025-07-21
