= George Barlow (American football) =

American football player and coach (born 1967)

Current position
- Title: Secondary coach
- Team: Louisiana
- Conference: Sun Belt

Biographical details
- Born: November 18, 1967 (age 58); Chicago, Illinois, U.S.

Playing career
- 1986–1990: Marshall
- Position: Safety

Coaching career (HC unless noted)
- 1991: Marshall (GA)
- 1992–1993: Marshall (LB)
- 1994: Hutchinson (DL)
- 1995: West Virginia State (DC)
- 1996–1997: Oklahoma (GA)
- 1998: Oklahoma (OLB/S)
- 1999–2001: James Madison (RB)
- 2002–2003: James Madison (DL)
- 2004–2008: James Madison (AHC/DC/S)
- 2009–2010: New Mexico (AHC/DB)
- 2011: New Mexico (AHC/DC)
- 2012–2013: Vanderbilt (DB/RC)
- 2014–2015: NC State (CB)
- 2016–2020: NC State (AHC/CB)
- 2021–2022: South Florida (CB)
- 2024–present: Louisiana (Secondary)

Head coaching record
- Overall: 1–7

George Barlow (born November 18, 1967) is an American college football coach who is currently the secondary coach at the University of Louisiana at Lafayette. He was the interim head coach for the University of New Mexico Lobos. He was elevated from defensive coordinator to interim head coach following the firing of Mike Locksley on September 25, 2011. He coached the Lobos for their final eight games in 2011. He has also coached at Vanderbilt, NC State, and Oklahoma.

== Playing career ==
Barlow played college football at Marshall University from 1986 to 1990. Playing the safety position, he was part of the 1987 national championship runner-up team. He still shares the team record for the most interceptions in a single game with three against East Tennessee State in 1989.

== Coaching career ==
Following his playing career, Barlow began his coaching career as a graduate assistant at Marshall in 1991. In addition to Marshall, he has coached at Hutchinson Community College, West Virginia State, Oklahoma and James Madison, where as defensive coordinator he helped lead the Dukes to the 2004 Division I-AA National Championship and four other playoff appearances, prior to becoming defensive backs coach at New Mexico in 2009. Barlow was named interim head coach at New Mexico following the firing of Mike Locksley on September 25, 2011. During the final eight games of the season, Barlow led the Lobos to one win and seven losses (1–7). On January 13, 2012, Vanderbilt head coach James Franklin announced Barlow had been hired to serve as the Commodores' defensive backs coach. In his two seasons at Vanderbilt, Barlow mentored the team’s defensive backs into one of the SEC’s most productive units, finishing in the Top-25 in both passing defense and passing efficiency defense during his tenure. On January 16, 2014, NC State head coach Dave Doeren announced Barlow had been hired to serve as the Wolfpack's cornerbacks coach.

== Head coaching record ==
Year	Team	Overall	Conference	Standing
New Mexico Lobos (Mountain West Conference) (2011)
2011	New Mexico	1–7	1–6	T–6th
New Mexico:		1–7	1–6	
Total:		1–7		
