= Mike Locksley =

American football player and coach (born 1969)

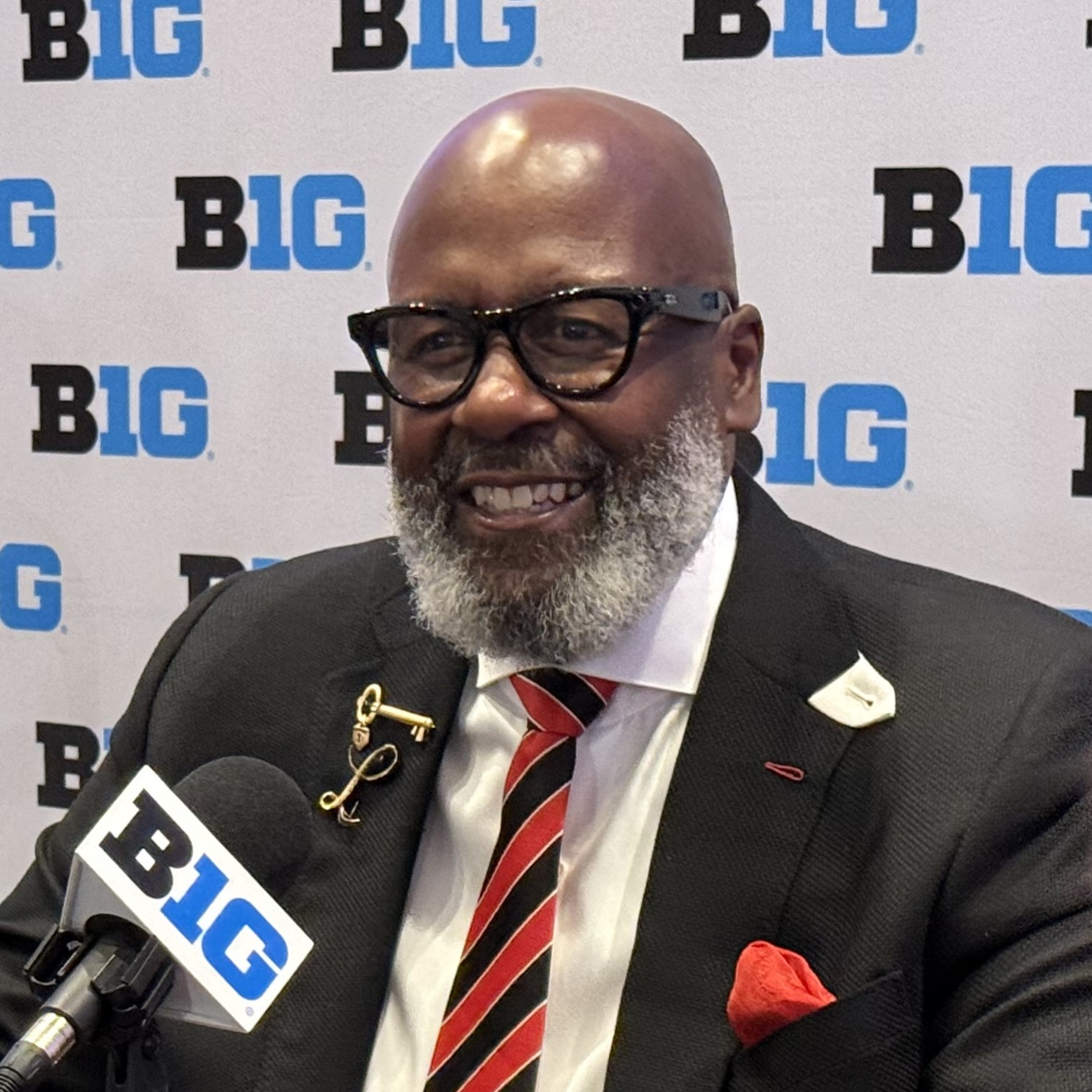
- Locksley at 2025 Big Ten Media Days

Biographical details
- Born: December 25, 1969 (age 56); Washington, D.C., U.S.

Playing career
- 1988–1992: Towson State
- Position: Defensive back

Coaching career (HC unless noted)
- 1992: Towson State (DB/ST)
- 1993: Navy Prep (RI) (DC/DB)
- 1994: Navy Prep (RI) (DC/DL)
- 1995: Pacific (CA) (OLB)
- 1996: Army (WR/TE)
- 1997: Maryland (RB)
- 1998–2002: Maryland (RB/RC)
- 2003–2004: Florida (RB/RC)
- 2005: Illinois (OC/TE)
- 2006–2008: Illinois (OC/QB)
- 2009–2011: New Mexico
- 2012–2015: Maryland (OC/QB)
- 2015: Maryland (interim HC)
- 2016: Alabama (OA)
- 2017: Alabama (co-OC/WR)
- 2018: Alabama (OC)
- 2019–2026: Maryland

Head coaching record
- Overall: 41–80
- Bowls: 3–0

Accomplishments and honors

Awards
- Broyles Award (2018)

Michael Anthony Locksley (born December 25, 1969) is an American college football coach. He was most recently the head football coach at the University of Maryland, College Park.

After serving as an assistant coach for several college football squads, he became the head football coach at the University of New Mexico in 2009, returning to Maryland as an offensive coordinator after his dismissal from New Mexico in 2011. In 2015, Locksley was named the interim head coach at Maryland after Randy Edsall was relieved of his duties. Locksley did not return to Maryland after that season, joining the University of Alabama as an offensive analyst. Locksley was promoted to offensive coordinator for the 2018 season, and that year received the Broyles Award, given to the nation's top assistant coach. Locksley returned to Maryland in December 2018 as head coach, following the firing of D. J. Durkin.

== Early life ==
Locksley grew up in inner-city Washington D.C., and attended Ballou High School.

== College playing career ==
Locksley played college football at Towson State University, now Towson University. He redshirted his first year on the Towson State Tigers and then spent two seasons sharing time at safety and cornerback, backing up Towson veteran Bryant Hall. For the 1990 season he had 43 tackles and two interceptions at safety, after he filled in for the injured Aaron Bates. He was named the Tigers' Defensive Player of the Year for his senior season. He graduated in the spring of 1992 with a degree in marketing.

== Coaching career ==
Locksley served as defensive backs coach and special teams coach at Towson State for the 1992 season, then defensive coordinator at Naval Academy Preparatory School in 1993 (defensive backs) and 1994 (defensive line), was outside linebackers coach at the University of the Pacific for 1995, then spent the 1996 season coaching tight ends and split ends at Army.

Locksley became the running backs coach for the University of Maryland under head coach Ron Vanderlinden in February 1997. Vanderlinden named Locksley to the additional post of recruiting coordinator, replacing Chris Cosh who left to take the defensive coordinator's job at Michigan State, in February 1998. After Vanderlinden was fired, in 2000, and Ralph Friedgen was named head coach, Locksley and wide receivers coach James Franklin were the only two assistants to be retained by Maryland.

In February 2003, after six years at Maryland, Locksley was named as running backs coach and recruiting coordinator at the University of Florida under Ron Zook, replacing Tyke Tolbert, who left to be a coach with the Arizona Cardinals of the NFL.

Locksley was named offensive coordinator at Illinois in January 2005, replacing Larry Fedora who went to Oklahoma State University, pairing Locksley again with head coach Ron Zook. He is credited with luring at least nine players from the Washington D.C. area for Illinois from 2005 through 2008, including wide receiver Arrelious Benn, 2007 Big Ten Freshman of the Year.

=== New Mexico ===
Locksley was named head coach of the New Mexico Lobos on December 9, 2008. He signed a six-year contract worth $750,000 annually.

In late May 2009, a former administrative assistant at New Mexico filed an age and sex discrimination complaint against Locksley with the Equal Opportunity Commission. The complaint was filed by Locksley's former administrative assistant Sylvia Lopez, who claimed to have been subjected to age and sexual discrimination before being transferred out of Locksley's office. The claims were later withdrawn.

In late September 2009, Locksley was reprimanded for an altercation with an assistant coach. He was subsequently suspended without pay for ten days. He was not on the sideline for the game against UNLV on October 24, 2009. Locksley led his Lobos to 1–11 records his first and second seasons. The high buyout was a large reason UNM chose at first not to fire him. New Mexico athletic director Paul Krebs, who made the decision to retain Locksley, expected improvement in the 2011 season. On September 25, 2011, Locksley was relieved of his duties following an 0–4 start that culminated in a loss at home to FCS Sam Houston State as well as the arrest of a minor for a DWI while driving a car registered to Locksley's 19-year-old son Meiko, a member of the Lobo football team. After an internal investigation by UNM, it was found the minor was not a recruit as erroneously reported. Instead, the minor was a childhood friend of Meiko Locksley from his Champaign, IL days, when his father served as offensive coordinator for the Illini from 2005 to 2008.

=== Second stint as assistant coach ===
==== Maryland ====
On December 22, 2011, Locksley returned to the University of Maryland to join Randy Edsall's staff as offensive coordinator and quarterbacks coach.

Locksley was named interim head coach at Maryland on October 11, 2015, after Edsall was terminated.

==== Alabama ====
On March 1, 2016, Locksley joined the University of Alabama staff as an offensive analyst. On January 13, 2017, he was promoted to an on-field coaching role helping the Tide win their 17th national championship. The following year, on January 17, 2018, he was promoted to offensive coordinator. Following the 2018 regular season, Locksley received the Broyles Award, given to the nation's top college football coaching assistant.

=== Maryland ===
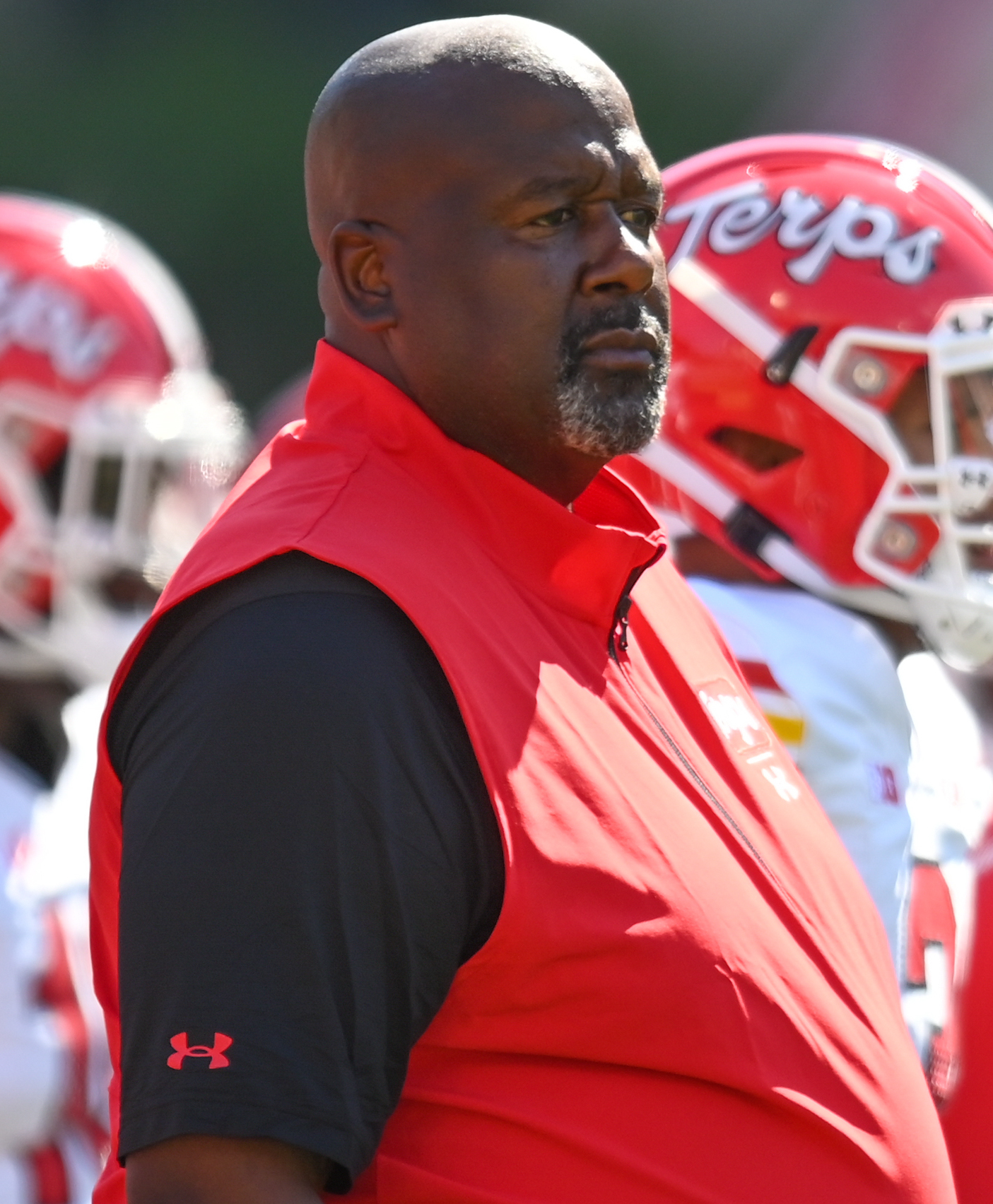
Locksley at Maryland Stadium in 2021.

==== 2019 season ====
On December 4, 2018, Locksley was named head football coach at the University of Maryland, becoming the 21st full-time head coach in program history. Locksley led Maryland to a strong offensive start. In the first game of the 2019 season, Maryland defeated FCS affiliate Howard 79–0, following that up with a victory against 21st-ranked Syracuse 63–20. The 142 points in its first two games marked the Terps' highest-ever scoring output in consecutive games, and the 63 points scored against Syracuse were the most points scored by a Maryland football team against a ranked opponent in program history. The Terps finished 3–9 in his first season as head coach.

==== 2020 season ====
In his second season as the head coach of the Terps, Locksley helped bring in Alabama quarterback transfer Taulia Tagovailoa. Locksley tested positive for COVID-19 on November 19, 2020. The Terps finished 2–3 after a highly condensed season due to the pandemic.

==== 2021 season ====
In his third season, Locksley led the Terps to victory over West Virginia in the season opener by a score of 30–24. In the following week, the Terps went 2–0 on the season after defeating Howard in a blowout by a score of 62–0. The Terps would finish the regular season 6–6 and would go on to win the 2021 New Era Pinstripe Bowl over Virginia Tech by a score of 54–10.

==== 2022 season ====
On April 29, 2022, Locksley signed a $21 million contract extension through the 2026 season. In his fourth season, Locksley started with 3–0 with wins over Buffalo, Charlotte, and SMU. He then finished the season going 4–5. The team would finish the year with a 8–5 overall record and a 4–5 conference record. He was bowl eligible for a second straight season which Maryland had not achieved since the 2007 and 2008 season. Locksley appeared and won the Duke's Mayo Bowl defeating NC State 16–12.

==== 2023 season ====
Locksley returned for his fifth season in 2023. In his fifth season, Locksley started the season with 5–0 record, the best start to a season since 2001. They would later finish conference play with a 4–5 record and 7–5 overall record. Locksley and the Terrapins were bowl eligible for a third straight season and played in the TransPerfect Music City Bowl winning over the Auburn Tigers, 31–13.

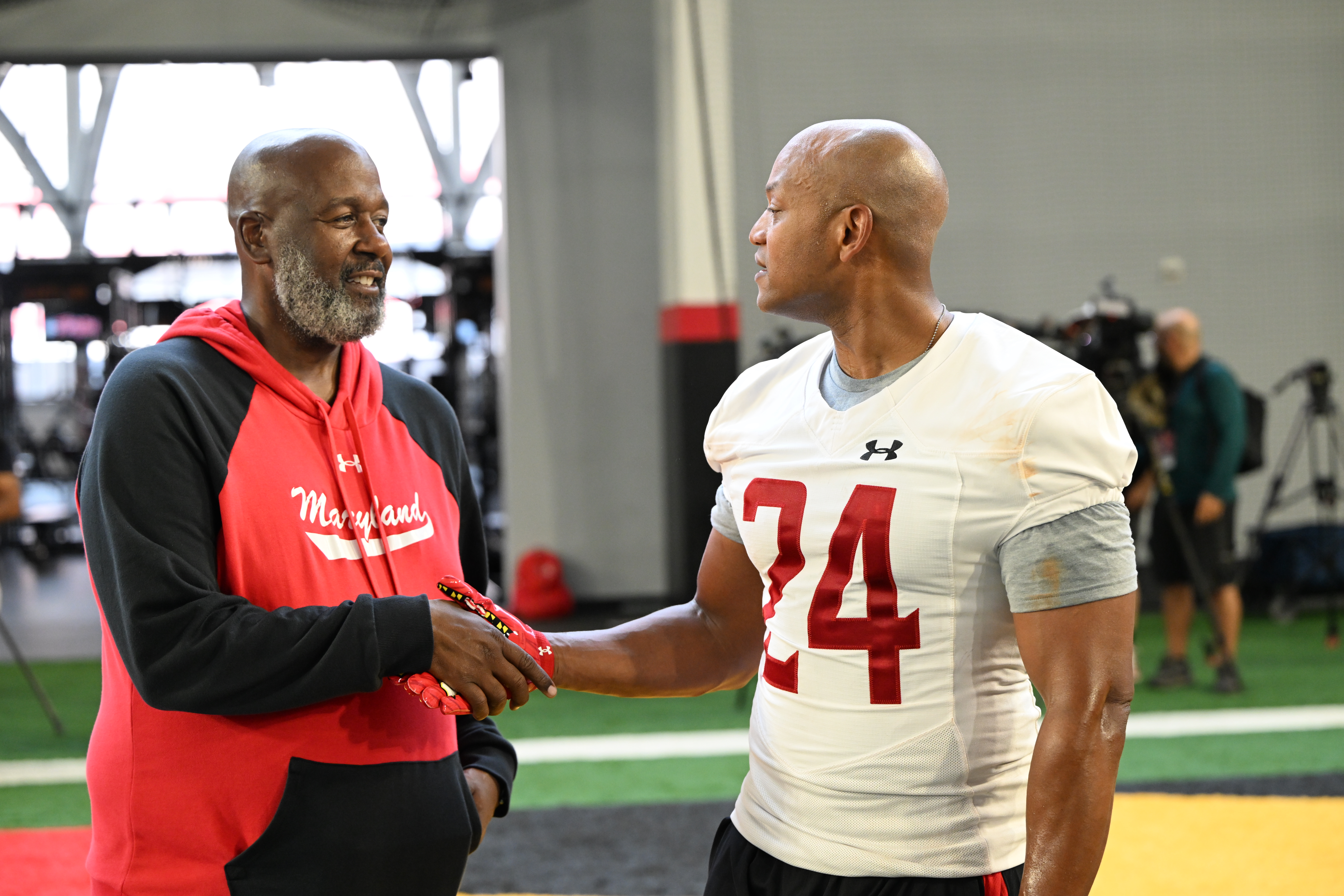
Locksley with Maryland governor Wes Moore in 2024.

==== 2024 season ====
Locksley returned for his sixth season as coach in 2024.The year was plagued with instability at the quarterback position after the departure of veteran quarterback Taulia Tagovailoa, and inconsistent defensive play. The team would finish with an overall record of 4–8 and a conference record on just 1–8. The poor performance on the year led to Locksley making multiple staff changes going into the following season.

==== 2025 season ====
Locksley returned as head coach for Maryland in 2025 for his seventh season.

==== 2026 season ====
After a 2–5 start to the regular season, Locksley was fired on October 21, 2026. Aazaar Abdul-Rahim was named interim head coach for the duration of the season.

== Personal life ==
Locksley and his wife Kia have four children: three sons (Mike Jr., Meiko, and Kai) and a daughter (Kori). On September 3, 2017, Meiko was fatally shot in Columbia, Maryland. Mike's son Kai was a college football quarterback who played at Texas and Iowa Western Community College, and finished his final two years of eligibility at UTEP. Kai now plays with the Hamilton Tiger-Cats in the Canadian Football League.

Kia Locksley is a yoga instructor. She helped teach some members of the Fighting Illini football team yoga in the summer of 2008.

== Head coaching record ==
Year	Team	Overall	Conference	Standing	Bowl/playoffs
New Mexico Lobos (Mountain West Conference) (2009–2011)
2009	New Mexico	1–11	1–7	8th	
2010	New Mexico	1–11	1–7	T–8th	
2011	New Mexico	0–4 (Note: Locksley was fired after the first four games of the 2011 season. George Barlow was named interim head coach and led New Mexico to a record of 1–7 over the final eight games of the season. The Lobos finished the year 1–11 overall and 1–6 in conference play, tying for sixth place in Mountain West Conference.)	0–1		
New Mexico:		2–26	2–15		
Maryland Terrapins (Big Ten Conference) (2015)
2015	Maryland	1–5 (Note: Randy Edsall served as Maryland's head coach for the first six games of the 2015 season before he was fired. Locksley was named interim head coach and led the team for the final six games of the season. The Terrapins finished the year 3–9 overall and 1–7 in Big Ten Conference play.)	1–5	T–6th (East)	
Maryland Terrapins (Big Ten Conference) (2019–2026)
2019	Maryland	3–9	1–8	6th (East)	
2020	Maryland	2–3	2–3	4th (East)	
2021	Maryland	7–6	3–6	5th (East)	W Pinstripe
2022	Maryland	8–5	4–5	4th (East)	W Duke's Mayo
2023	Maryland	8–5	4–5	4th (East)	W Music City
2024	Maryland	4–8	1–8	17th	
2025	Maryland	4–8	1–8	T–16th	
2026	Maryland	2–5 (Note: Locksley was fired after the first seven games of the 2026 season. Aazaar Abdul-Rahim was named interim head coach.)	0–4		
Maryland:		39–54	17–52		
Total:		41–80			
