= Malik Washington (quarterback) =

American football player (born 2006)

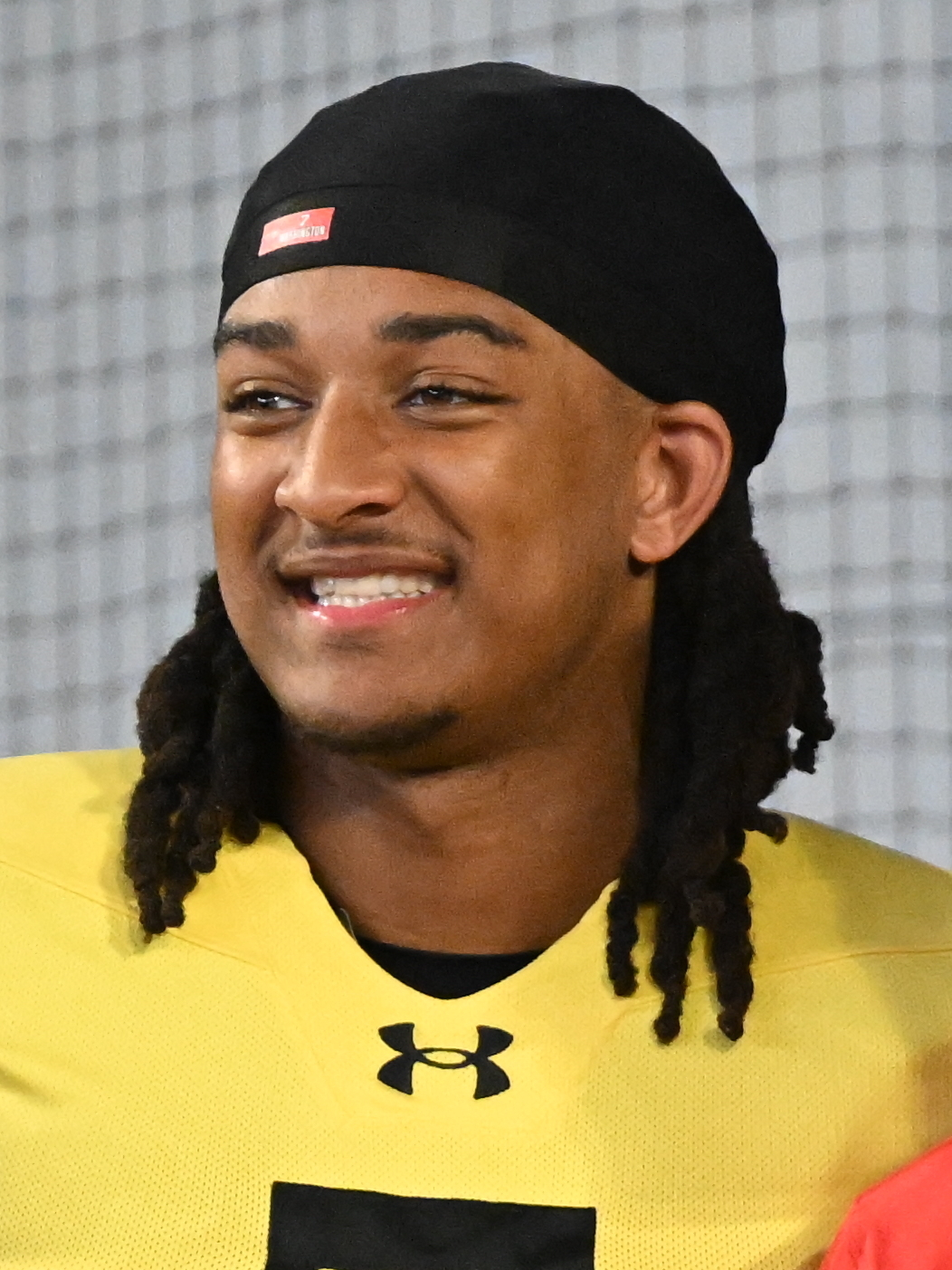
- Washington in 2025

No. 7 – Maryland Terrapins
- Position: Quarterback
- Class: Sophomore

Personal information
- Born: January 4, 2006 (age 20)
- Listed height: 6 ft 5 in (1.96 m)
- Listed weight: 231 lb (105 kg)

Career information
- High school: Archbishop Spalding (Severn, Maryland)
- College: Maryland (2025–present)

Malik Washington is an American college football quarterback for the Maryland Terrapins.

== Early life ==
Washington is from Glen Burnie, Maryland. He is one of six siblings and was raised in Freetown, Maryland, where his relatives helped run the community association and built a park named for an uncle. His great-grandfather left Fogo, Cape Verde in 1914, while his great-grandmother was born in Massachusetts and is from Brava, Cape Verde.

Washington started competing in several sports, including football, basketball and baseball, from a young age. He attended Archbishop Spalding High School in Severn, Maryland, where he was a top football and basketball player. A quarterback on the football team, he was backup as a freshman in 2021 before winning the starting job in 2022, leading his team to a record of 11–1 and the school's first-ever Maryland Interscholastic Athletic Association (MIAA) Conference A title, while throwing for 2,979 yards and 29 touchdowns.

As a junior, Washington threw for 2,093 yards, completed 62.3% of his passes, and led Spalding to a second-straight MIAA title. He was named The Baltimore Sun's 2023–24 boys athlete of the year. He then led Spalding to a third-straight title as a senior in 2024, throwing for 22 touchdowns and running for eight more while his school went 12–0 and were ranked top 10 in the nation. He was named the Gatorade Maryland Player of the Year and the Capital Gazette player of the year. He was the first quarterback to win three consecutive MIAA championships and finished as the MIAA all-time leading passer, additionally compiling a career conference record of 25–0 as a starter. Washington was invited to the Elite 11 quarterback competition and was a US Army and US Navy All-American.

Washington was also a top basketball player while at Spalding, and competed for Team Melo in the Nike Elite Youth Basketball League (EYBL). He received All–BCL second team honors for the 2022–2023 basketball season and All–BCL first team honors the following year in 2023–2024.

Washington was rated a four-star football recruit and one of the top quarterbacks in the class of 2025. On June 28, 2025, he committed to play college football for the Maryland Terrapins over offers from Virginia Tech, Penn State, Syracuse, and UCF.

== College career ==
=== Freshman year ===
Washington earned the starting role as a true freshman at the University of Maryland in 2025. In his collegiate debut against Florida Atlantic, Washington threw for 258 yards and 3 touchdowns in the 39-7 victory against the Owls. Following his impressive debut, Washington was named Big Ten Freshman of the Week. On September 20, Washington threw for 265 yards and two touchdowns to beat Wisconsin at Camp Randall Stadium. It was the Terps first win against the Badgers in program history. For his efforts, Washington was named Big Ten Freshman of the Week for a second time. Maryland ended the season losing its last eight games and finishing with a record of 4-8. Washington finished with 21 total touchdowns and 9 interceptions to end his freshman campaign.

=== Statistics ===
Year	Team	Games			Passing								Rushing			
Year	Team	GP	GS	Record	Cmp	Att	Pct	Yds	Avg	TD	INT	Rtg	Att	Yds	Avg	TD
2025	Maryland	12	12	4–8	273	473	57.7	2,963	6.3	17	9	118.4	56	303	5.4	4
2026	Maryland	10	10	3–7	211	346	61.0	2,309	6.7	11	10	122.0	55	172	3.1	5
Career		22	22	7–15	484	819	59.1	5,272	6.4	28	19	119.8	111	475	4.3	9
