= Chris Durr Jr. =

American football player

No. 13 – Maryland Terrapins
- Position: Wide receiver
- Class: Junior

Personal information
- Listed height: 5 ft 11 in (1.80 m)
- Listed weight: 173 lb (78 kg)

Career information
- High school: Morgan Park (Chicago, Illinois)
- College: Wyoming (2024–2025); Maryland (2026–present)
- Stats at ESPN

Chris Durr Jr. is an American college football wide receiver for the Maryland Terrapins. He previously played for the Wyoming Cowboys.

== Early life ==
Durr is from Morgan Park, Chicago, Illinois. He attended Morgan Park High School where he competed in football as a wide receiver and was a top player for the varsity team starting with his freshman year. Durr received the nickname "Slim Reaper" in high school. In his junior season, he caught 51 passes for 1,013 yards and 16 touchdowns, while as a senior, he caught 86 passes for 1,130 yards and 13 touchdowns. He was honored twice as a first-team Class 5A all-state at Morgan Park. A three-star prospect, Durr committed to play college football for the Wyoming Cowboys.

== College career ==
Durr impressed early at Wyoming and caught a touchdown pass in his first career game in 2024. Appearing in nine of 12 games, he posted 31 receptions for 348 yards and a touchdown. The following year, Durr was the team's leading receiver and posted 45 catches for 469 yards and four touchdowns. He entered the NCAA transfer portal after the season and transferred to the Maryland Terrapins. He entered the 2026 season as Maryland's top receiver.
