= DeJuan Williams =

American football player (born 2006)

No. 0 – Maryland Terrapins
- Position: Running back
- Class: Redshirt Sophomore

Personal information
- Born: January 26, 2006 (age 20)
- Listed height: 5 ft 11 in (1.80 m)
- Listed weight: 215 lb (98 kg)

Career information
- High school: Saint Frances (Baltimore, Maryland)
- College: Maryland (2024–present)
- Stats at ESPN

DeJuan Williams (born January 26, 2006) is an American football running back for the Maryland Terrapins.

== Early life ==
Williams attended Saint Frances Academy in Baltimore, Maryland. He played football and competed in track, setting a school record in the 55-meter dash. Williams had two consecutive 100 yards rushing in 2022, before missing the entire 2023 high school football season due to a torn ACL. He was rated as a four-star recruit and the No. 33 running back in the country by 247Sports. On July 4, 2023, Williams committed to play college football at the University of Maryland, over offers from Michigan, Ohio State, Oregon and Penn State, among others.

== College career ==
Williams played in three games in his freshman year, scoring his first touchdown in his first game for the Terps against UConn. He finished his redshirt year with 46 rushing yards and one touchdown with one catch for two yards.

As a redshirt freshman, Williams saw an expanded role in the offense, rushing for 501 yards and three touchdowns. In addition to being the leading rusher, he was also Maryland's fourth leading receiver with 426 yards and one touchdown.

=== College statistics ===
Legend
**Bold**	Career high

Year	Team	Games		Rushing				Receiving			
Year	Team	GP	GS	Att	Yds	Avg	TD	Rec	Yds	Avg	TD
2024	Maryland	3	0	8	46	**5.8**	1	1	2	2.0	0
2025	Maryland	**12**	**9**	**128**	**501**	3.9	**3**	**45**	**426**	**9.5**	**1**
Career		15	9	136	547	4.0	4	46	428	9.3	1
