= Kwazi Gilmer =

American football player

No. 3 – Nebraska Cornhuskers
- Position: Wide receiver
- Class: Junior

Personal information
- Listed height: 6 ft 2 in (1.88 m)
- Listed weight: 195 lb (88 kg)

Career information
- High school: Sierra Canyon School (Chatsworth, California)
- College: UCLA (2024–2025); Nebraska (2026–present)
- Stats at ESPN

Kwazi Gilmer is an American college football wide receiver for the Nebraska Cornhuskers. He previously played for the UCLA Bruins.

== Early life ==
Gilmer attended Chaminade College Preparatory in West Hills, Los Angeles, California before transferring to Sierra Canyon School in Chatsworth, Los Angeles, California. During his high school career he had 87 receptions for 1,630 yards and 18 touchdowns. He committed to the University of California, Los Angeles (UCLA) to play college football.

== College career ==
Gilmer earned immediate playing time his freshman year at UCLA in 2024, eventually becoming a starter. He appeared in all 12 games with seven starts and had 31 receptions for 345 yards and two touchdowns. Gilmer returned to UCLA as the teams number one receiver in 2025. He started all 12 games and led the team with 50 receptions for 535 yards and four touchdowns. After the season, Gilmer entered the transfer portal and committed to the University of Nebraska–Lincoln. He entered his first seson with the Cornhuskers in 2026 as the teams number one receiver.
