= Aazaar Abdul-Rahim =

American football player and coach (born 1976)

Current position
- Title: Interim head coach
- Team: Maryland
- Conference: Big Ten
- Record: 2–2

Biographical details
- Born: November 1, 1976 (age 50); Washington, D.C., U.S.

Playing career
- 1995–1996: Mesa (AZ)
- 1997–1999: San Diego State
- 2000–2002: San Diego Riptide
- Position: Defensive back

Coaching career (HC unless noted)
- 2003–2013: Friendship Collegiate (DC)
- 2014: Alabama (analyst)
- 2015: Alabama (asst. DPP)
- 2016–2017: Maryland (DB)
- 2018: Maryland (CB)
- 2019: UMass (DC/CB)
- 2020: Boston College (DB)
- 2021–2022: Boston College (AHC/PGC/DB)
- 2023: Boston College (co-DC/DB)
- 2024–2026: Maryland (co-DC/DB)
- 2026–present: Maryland (interim HC)

Head coaching record
- Overall: 2–2

Aazaar Abdul-Rahim (born November 1, 1976) is an American college football coach and former player who is the interim head coach at the University of Maryland, College Park. He has previously served as the co-defensive coordinator and defensive backs coach at Maryland, an assistant coach at Boston College, University of Massachusetts Amherst (UMass), and the University of Alabama.

Abdul-Rahim served as the head football coach at Friendship Collegiate Academy Public Charter School in his native Washington, D.C. from 2003 to 2013.

== Playing career ==
Abdul-Rahim played defensive back for Mesa Community College from 1995 through 1996, before transferring to San Diego State. He played for the Aztecs from 1997 through 1999. Following his college career, he competed for the San Diego Riptide.

== Coaching career ==
=== Friendship Collegiate Academy ===
Following his playing career, Abdul-Rahim founded the football program at Friendship Collegiate Academy in Washington, D.C. in 2003. The school had only been open since 2000. The Knights started play in the 2004 season. After a winless inaugural season, Abdul-Rahim turned FCA into a national powerhouse, routinely playing top ranked teams from the area. In 2012, Abdul-Rahim led the Knight to a District of Columbia State Athletic Association championship. During his tenure, he won 62 games, and produced over 100 Division I football players.

=== Alabama ===
Abdul-Rahim joined the Alabama football staff as a defensive analyst for the 2014 season. The next season, he was promoted to assistant director of player personnel. He was on the 2015 Alabama coaching staff that won the National Championship.

=== Maryland ===
In 2016, Abdul-Rahim joined new head coach D. J. Durkin's staff at Maryland as the defensive backs coach. He was also a huge part of the recruiting efforts, particularly for his ties to the D.C. area. Abdul-Rahim was named a top 25 recruiter by both Rivals.com and 247sports in 2017. In 2018, he shifted his focus from the entire secondary, to primarily working with the cornerbacks.

=== UMass ===
In 2019, new head coach Walt Bell hired Abdul-Rahim as the new defensive coordinator and cornerbacks coach at UMass.

=== Boston College ===
In 2020, new head coach Jeff Hafley hired Abdul-Rahim as the new defensive backs coach at Boston College Eagles football. Prior to the 2021 season, Abdul-Rahim was promoted to associate head coach and defensive pass game coordinator.

=== Return to Maryland ===
In 2024, he returned to the Maryland Terrapins as co-defensive coordinator. In October of 2026, he was named Interim Head Coach after Mike Locksley’s tenure ended.

== Personal life ==
Abdul-Rahim founded "Cover One", a defensive back training academy that has worked with dozens of NFL players.

== Head coaching record ==
| Year | Team | Overall | Conference | Standing | Bowl/playoffs |
|---|---|---|---|---|---|
Maryland Terrapins (Big Ten Conference) (2026–present)
| 2026 | Maryland | 2–2 (Note: Abdul-Rahim was named interim head coach for the remainder of the 2026 season after Mike Locksley was fired after seven games) | 2–2 | | |
| Maryland: | | 2–2 | 2–2 | | |
| Total: | | 2–2 | | | |
