= James Thomas Jr. =

American football coach

Current position
- Title: Special teams coordinator
- Team: Maryland Terrapins
- Conference: Big 10
- Annual salary: $300,000 (2023)

Biographical details
- Born: Orlando, Florida, U.S.
- Education: Graceland University; Western New Mexico University

Playing career
- 2004–2008: Graceland
- Position: Cornerback

Coaching career (HC unless noted)
- 2009: Graceland (GA)
- 2010–2011: Western New Mexico (WR)
- 2012–2013: Western New Mexico (STC/DB)
- 2014–2015: Western New Mexico (DC/DB)
- 2016–2018: Clarion (DC)
- 2019–2020: Angelo State (Co-DC/STC/DB)
- 2021: Maryland (STQC)
- 2022–2024: Maryland (STC/OLB)
- 2025–2026: Maryland (S)

James Edward Thomas Jr. is an American football coach and former player. He is currently the safeties coach at the University of Maryland. He has also coached at Graceland University, Western New Mexico University, Clarion University, and Angelo State University.

== Coaching career ==
=== Graceland ===
Thomas served as a graduate assistant defensive backs coach for the 2009 season, following his playing career.

=== Western New Mexico ===
The following year, Thomas began coaching the wide receivers coach for the Western New Mexico Mustangs as a graduate assistant. After two seasons, he moved back to the defensive side of the ball, coaching the defensive backs, while also adding special teams coordinator duties. Prior to the 2014 season, Thomas was again promoted. He served as the defensive coordinator for the 2014 and 2015 seasons. He was the youngest defensive coordinator in college football, at the age of 27 in 2014. During his time with the Mustangs, Thomas coached at least seven all-conference performers.

=== Clarion ===
For the 2016 season, Thomas joined the staff at Clarion as the defensive coordinator. He took over a young defense, starting four different freshmen for at least five games each. The following season, the youth movement paid off as the Golden Eagle defense ranked second in the PSAC West in total defense and third in passing defense. Three of Clarion's four all-conference selections were from the defensive side. The next year, led by Preseason All-American selections, Brandon Vocco and Alec Heldreth, the Golden Eagles were top 16 in the nation in interceptions, takeaways, red zone defense, and opponent fourth down conversions. They finished the year with 4 more all conference players.

=== Angelo State ===
Thomas spent the 2019 and 2020 seasons at Angelo State as the co-defensive coordinator, special teams coordinator, and defensive backs coach. With his help, the Rams defensive units third nationally in scoring defense, fifth in defensive pass efficiency, and tenth in interceptions.

=== Maryland ===
Thomas joined the Maryland staff as a special teams quality control coach for the 2021 season. The following season, he briefly joined the staff at Florida before rejoining the Terrapin staff as the special teams coordinator and outside linebackers coach.

== Playing career ==
Thomas was a stellar athlete during his time at Graceland. In football, he started at cornerback for the Yellowjackets all four seasons. Additionally, Thomas earned all-conference honors his final three seasons. In the football offseason, he starred for the Yellowjacket Track and Field team, becoming an indoor track All-American in the 60-meter dash and breaking the school record in the 100-meter dash with a blazing time of 10.52 seconds.

== Personal life ==
Originally from an area of poverty in Orlando, Florida, Thomas attended Graceland, in part, as an avenue to break out of the cycle. The relationships built while at the Lamoni, Iowa school continue to influence his life. He met his wife, Razanna, while at Graceland, as well as getting his start in coaching from one of his former Yellowjacket coaches, Adam Clark, whom he worked for both at Western New Mexico and Angelo State.

Thomas earned dual degrees in physical education and health from Graceland in 2009, and a master's degree in educational leadership from Western New Mexico in 2014. He and his wife have three children.
