= Ted Monachino =

American football coach (born 1966)

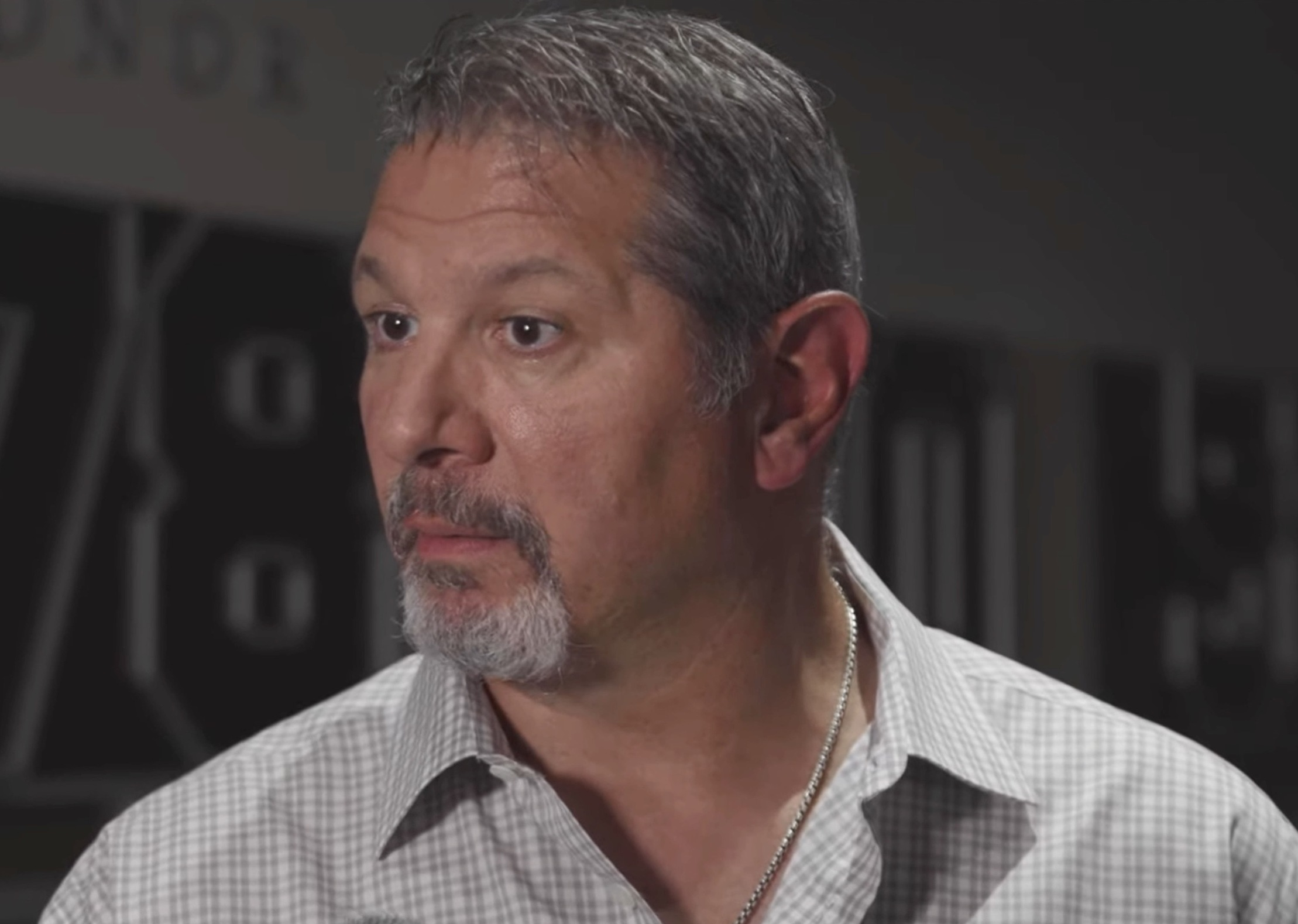
- Monachino in 2022

Personal information
- Born: October 15, 1966 (age 60); Council Bluffs, Iowa, U.S.

Career information
- High school: Bethany (MO) South Harrison
- College: Missouri

Career history
- Pacific HS (1991–1993) Defensive coordinator & linebackers coach; Hannibal HS (1994–1995) Defensive coordinator & special teams coordinator; Texas Christian (1996–1997) Defensive graduate assistant; James Madison (1998) Defensive line coach; Missouri State (1999) Outside linebackers coach; Boise State (2000) Defensive line coach; Arizona State (2001–2005) Defensive line coach; Jacksonville Jaguars (2006–2009) Defensive line coach; Baltimore Ravens (2010–2015) Outside linebackers coach; Indianapolis Colts (2016–2017) Defensive coordinator; Missouri (2018) Senior defensive analyst; Chicago Bears (2019–2020) Senior defensive assistant & outside linebackers coach; Atlanta Falcons (2021–2022) Outside linebackers coach; North Carolina (2023) Senior defensive analyst; North Carolina (2024) Defensive line coach; Maryland (2025–2026) Defensive coordinator

Awards and highlights
- Super Bowl champion (XLVII)
- Coaching profile at Pro Football Reference

Ted Monachino (born October 15, 1966) is an American football coach. He was previously the defensive coordinator at University of Maryland. He was hired by North Carolina in 2023 as a senior defensive analyst before being elevated to the defensive line position following the departures of Tim Cross and Gene Chizik. A longtime assistant in the National Football League (NFL), Monachino coached for several teams, including most recently as outside linebackers coach for the Atlanta Falcons. Monachino also coached for Missouri in 2018 and served as the defensive coordinator for the Indianapolis Colts from 2016 to 2017. He was also formerly the linebackers coach for the Baltimore Ravens from 2010 to 2015. He was part of the Ravens' coaching staff that won Super Bowl XLVII.

== Playing career ==
Monachino was a three-year letterman in football at the University of Missouri, graduating with a degree in health and physical education in 1990.

== Coaching career ==
=== Baltimore Ravens ===
After being fired from the Jaguars, he joined the Baltimore Ravens in 2010 as the outside linebackers coach. During the season, the Ravens went 12-4 and made the AFC Wild Card. After beating the Kansas City Chiefs in the wild card round, they would go on to lose in the AFC Divisional Round to the Pittsburgh Steelers 24–31. During the regular season they defeated 3 playoff teams; the AFC North champion Steelers, the New York Jets, and the New Orleans Saints. Under his coaching, Terrell Suggs finished third in tackles for loss and earned a Pro Bowl nod.

During the 2011 season, the Ravens went 12-4 and made the playoffs for the fourth straight year. They also won the AFC North, the third time in franchise history. After defeating the Houston Texans in the Divisional round they would go on to lose to the New England Patriots in the AFC Championship game 20–23. During the regular season they beat four playoff teams; the NFC West champion San Francisco 49ers, the AFC South champion Houston Texans, the Pittsburgh Steelers (twice), and the Cincinnati Bengals (twice). Under his coaching, Terrell Suggs led the league in forced fumbles, 4th in tackles for loss, and 5th in sacks. He was named an All-Pro and made the Pro Bowl as well as 2011 Defensive Player of the Year.

In 2012, the Ravens went 10–6, making the playoffs for the fifth straight year and won the AFC North for the second straight year for the first time in franchise history. After defeating Andrew Luck's Colts, Peyton Manning's Broncos, and Tom Brady's Patriots, the Ravens would go on to defeat the San Francisco 49ers in Super Bowl XLVII 34–31, winning their second Super Bowl in franchise history. During the regular season, they would defeat two playoff teams, the AFC East Champion New England Patriots, and the Cincinnati Bengals.

After winning the Super Bowl, the Ravens went 8–8 in 2013 and missed the playoffs for the first time since 2007. Under his coaching Terrell Suggs made the Pro Bowl.

In 2014, the Ravens went 10–6, and made the AFC Wild Card. After defeating the Steelers in the Wild Card round they would go on to lose to the New England Patriots in the Divisional Round 31–35. During the regular season they would defeat two playoff teams; the AFC North champion Pittsburgh Steelers & NFC South champion Carolina Panthers. Under his coaching Elvis Dumervil finished third in sacks with Terrell Suggs following in ninth. Dumervil was a 1st-team All-Pro and a Pro Bowler.

In Monachino's last year with the Ravens, the team went 5–11 in 2015, the worst record since 2007. Under his coaching Elvis Dumervil made the Pro Bowl. After 2015, he left the Ravens to reunite with his former defensive coordinator, the new head coach of the Indianapolis Colts, Chuck Pagano.

=== Indianapolis Colts ===
On January 7, 2016, Monachino was named the defensive coordinator of the Indianapolis Colts. During the 2016 season, the Colts went 8-8 and missed the playoffs for the second year in a row.

During the 2017 off-season, the Colts drafted defensive backs Malik Hooker, Quincy Wilson, and Nate Hairston, linebackers Tarell Basham, Anthony Walker Jr. and defensive lineman Grover Stewart in the 2017 NFL draft. The Colts let Erik Walden, Robert Mathis, and Mike Adams go, but signed defensive lineman Al Woods and Johnathan Hankins, linebackers John Simon, Jon Bostic and Jabaal Sheard. In the 2017 season, the Colts went 4-12 and the Colts missed the playoffs for the third consecutive year and head coach Chuck Pagano was fired.

=== Chicago Bears ===
After spending 2018 as a defensive analyst for Missouri, he joined Kansas State in to serve as defensive coordinator and linebackers coach under first-year coach Chris Klieman. A month later, however, he departed the position to become the Chicago Bears' senior defensive assistant and outside linebackers coach, reuniting him with Bears defensive coordinator Chuck Pagano whom he worked with in Baltimore and Indianapolis. The Bears went 8–8 in 2019 and missed the playoffs. Under his coaching, Khalil Mack made the Pro Bowl. Several weeks following the retirement of Pagano after the 2020 season, it was reported that Monachino would not return to the Bears' coaching staff the following year.

=== Atlanta Falcons ===
On January 26, 2021, Monachino was hired by the Atlanta Falcons as their outside linebackers coach under head coach Arthur Smith.

=== North Carolina ===
Monachino was hired by Mack Brown in 2023 as the Tar Heels' Senior Defensive Analyst. After in-season defensive struggles led to the dismissals of coordinator Gene Chizik and defensive line coach Tim Cross, Monachino was elevated to the defensive line coaching position.
