= Maryland–Rutgers football rivalry =

Maryland and Rutgers football rivalry

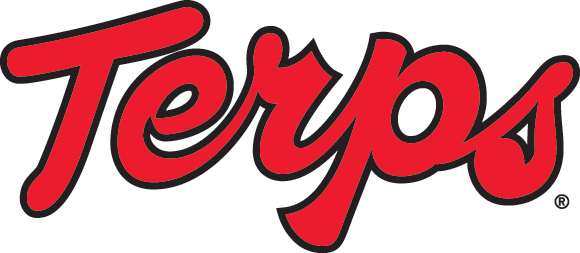
- Maryland Terrapins Rutgers Scarlet Knights
- Sport: College football
- First meeting: October 2, 1920; Rutgers 6, Maryland 0
- Latest meeting: October 17, 2026; Rutgers 37, Maryland 30
- Next meeting: 2027

Statistics
- Total meetings: 22 (played annually since 2014)
- All-time series: Maryland leads, 12–10
- Largest victory: Maryland: 48–7 (2019); Rutgers: 20–0 (1941)
- Longest win streak: Maryland: 3 (2021–2023); Rutgers: 3 (2024–present)
- Current win streak: Rutgers: 3 (2024–present)

Locations of (1) College Park (UMD) and (2) Piscataway (RU).

The Maryland–Rutgers football rivalry is an American college football rivalry between the Maryland Terrapins and the Rutgers Scarlet Knights of the Big Ten Conference.

The programs first met in 1920 and played nine nonconference games through 2009. Both joined the Big Ten in 2014, after which the game became an annual fixture; the conference designated it a protected annual matchup in 2024.

Through 2026, Maryland leads the series 12–10. The matchup has no trophy, and commentators have divided over whether it constitutes a rivalry, with national writers treating it as a product of conference realignment and regional coverage describing an emerging one.

== History ==
=== Early meetings (1920-2009) ===
The schools played nine nonconference games between 1920 and 2009, with Maryland holding a 5–4 record.

=== Big Ten era (2014-present) ===
When Maryland and Rutgers joined the Big Ten Conference together in 2014, they were placed in the conference's newly formed East Division.

In seven of their first ten Big Ten seasons (2014–23), Maryland and Rutgers were scheduled to play each other in the final week of the regular season.

In 2024, the expanded 18-team Big Ten eliminated divisions but designated Maryland–Rutgers as one of 12 protected annual matchups in the new Flex Protect XVIII model, ensuring the teams would continue to meet annually through at least 2028.

In September 2025, the Big Ten included Maryland at Rutgers among 17 games in the inaugural Big Ten Rivalry Series presented by Venmo.

Since joining the Big Ten on the same day, Maryland and Rutgers have remained its lowest-revenue athletic departments. Since 2014, the two have compiled the conference's worst records in league football play—Maryland 29–73 and Rutgers 22–84 through the 2025 season—and reported its two lowest football ticket-sales totals among Big Ten public schools. In fiscal year 2025, Maryland reported $124 million in athletic revenue, the lowest in the conference, ahead of only Rutgers' $146.64 million; Rutgers' athletic department had absorbed $518.9 million in losses, subsidies and student fees over its first 11 Big Ten seasons. Both schools hired new athletic directors in July 2025.

== 2017 Yankee Stadium Game ==
In 2017, Rutgers attempted to move their home game against Maryland to Yankee Stadium as part of a football and wrestling doubleheader. Marketed as "The Battle in the Bronx," the game was scheduled for November 4, but had to be moved back to their home field at High Point Solutions Stadium (now SHI Stadium) with just two weeks' notice due to the possibility of the New York Yankees hosting World Series games

The Yankees were eliminated from the 2017 American League Championship Series by the Houston Astros one day after Rutgers announced the venue change, meaning the stadium would have been available after all. Rutgers had paid a $750,000 stadium rental fee, which was refunded when the game was relocated. Fan response to the original Yankee Stadium plan had been lukewarm, with many expressing concerns about parking, tailgating, and sight lines, along with the fact that the tickets were a required component of 2017 season ticket packages

== Rivalry trophy discussions ==
In July 2016, Rutgers Athletic Director Patrick E. Hobbs and then-head coach Chris Ash publicly acknowledged having "initial conversations with Maryland" about creating a rivalry trophy. Maryland's response was notably tepid, with head coach DJ Durkin offering what media described as "a bit of a non-answer" at that year's Big Ten Media Days, saying such matters were "more for fans, people around the game."

The trophy discussions generated various suggestions from fans and media, including "The Market Capturer Cup" (referencing both schools' media market-driven addition to the Big Ten), "The Old Oaken Metro Area" (noting neither school's location in their claimed New York and Washington media markets), and "The Iron Traincar Full of Bros Arguing About Moe's and Chipotle" In a November 2014 NJ.com reader poll about potential trophy concepts, the most popular response was "Wait. When did Maryland-Rutgers become a rivalry?" receiving 24.74% of votes, while the top-earning concrete trophy was "Delaware!"

=== Delaware as a trophy ===
Initial fan trophy discussions centered on Delaware as a rivalry prize, given the state's position as a narrow buffer between Maryland and New Jersey, and on both states' colonial-era claims to its territory. (Note: Maryland's 1632 charter granted Cecil Calvert territory running north to "that Part of the Bay of Delaware on the North, which lieth under the Fortieth Degree of North Latitude," while describing the grant as covering "a Country hitherto uncultivated." Both clauses figured in the Penn–Calvert boundary dispute, which the Mason–Dixon line survey ultimately settled against Maryland. New Jersey's interest is narrower but more durable: Charles II's 1681 grant to William Penn excepted a twelve-mile circle around New Castle, then held by the Duke of York, who conveyed it to Penn the following year. Within that arc—and only within it—Delaware's territory runs to the low-water mark on the New Jersey shore rather than to the middle of the river. New Jersey has contested the resulting riparian jurisdiction repeatedly, most recently in New Jersey v. Delaware (2008), in which the Supreme Court ruled 6–2 for Delaware; Justices Scalia and Alito, both New Jersey natives, dissented.)

== Perception ==
Commentators have divided over whether the annual meeting constitutes a rivalry. Asked in 2022 whether he considered Maryland a rival, Rutgers head coach Greg Schiano said the programs had "good games" but that "I don't think we have enough history yet for it to become a rivalry," adding that such relationships develop "organically" through recruiting battles and repeated competitive meetings.

Critics cite the matchup as an example of how conference realignment forced manufactured rivalries. On the Banks argued that both programs were "fledglings in the Big Ten, sitting at the kids table in terms of Big Ten rivalries, while the elders, Ohio State, Penn State, Michigan, Michigan State, etc., have had more time to develop true rivalries amongst themselves." The Athletic noted that newer protected matchups have struggled to generate similar gravitas but are driven by geographic convenience. Surveying every Power Four program's chief rival in 2026, The Athletic's Joe Rexrode placed Maryland and Rutgers together by default—"What else to do with these two?"—and described them as "joined in mutual indifference," omitting the pairing from the outlet's ranking of the sport's 100 greatest rivalries.

Regional coverage has been warmer. Previewing the 2025 meeting, NJ.com's staff wrote that "there is no official moment where a matchup becomes a rivalry, but it feels like Rutgers and Maryland are approaching that territory," arguing that "rivalries are not created when a conference assigns them via a sponsorship deal" but by games with stakes for both sides. By 2026 beat coverage referred to the game as a rivalry without qualification.

The Know Rivalry Project, an academic survey conducted by Joe Cobbs of Northern Kentucky University and David Tyler of the University of Massachusetts Amherst, asks fans to allocate 100 "rivalry points" among their team's opponents. Its data record the relationship as asymmetric: Rutgers fans assigned Maryland 16.2 points, the second-highest total among Rutgers' listed opponents, while Maryland fans assigned Rutgers 6.7, the lowest among Maryland's. On the project's hostility measures, adapted in part from Pettigrew and Meertens's prejudice scales, Rutgers fans rated their prejudice toward Maryland fans at 3.8 and their willingness to discriminate against them in personal and professional relationships at 2.3, each on a seven-point scale; corresponding figures for Maryland fans are not reported.

== Statistics ==
Through 2026, Maryland leads the series 12–10, with a 7–6 record in conference play.

== Game results ==
Maryland victories	Rutgers victories

No.	Date	Location	Winner	Score
1	October 2, 1920	Piscataway	Rutgers	6–0
2	October 1, 1921	Piscataway	Maryland	3–0
3	October 10, 1925	Philadelphia	Maryland	16–0
4	October 21, 1939	Piscataway	Rutgers	25–12
5	November 21, 1940	Baltimore	Maryland	14–7
6	November 1, 1941	Piscataway	Rutgers	20–0
7	October 10, 1942	College Park	Maryland	27–13
8	September 29, 2007	Piscataway	Maryland	34–24
9	September 26, 2009	College Park	Rutgers	34–13
10	November 29, 2014	College Park	Rutgers	41–38
11	November 28, 2015	Piscataway	Maryland	46–41
12	November 26, 2016	College Park	Maryland	31–13

No.	Date	Location	Winner	Score
13	November 4, 2017	Piscataway	Rutgers	31–24
14	October 13, 2018	College Park	Maryland	34–7
15	October 5, 2019	Piscataway	Maryland	48–7
16	December 12, 2020	College Park	Rutgers	27–24
17	November 27, 2021	Piscataway	Maryland	40–16
18	November 26, 2022	College Park	Maryland	37–0
19	November 25, 2023	Piscataway	Maryland	42–24
20	November 16, 2024	College Park	Rutgers	31–17
21	November 8, 2025	Piscataway	Rutgers	35–20
22	October 17, 2026	College Park	Rutgers	37–30
Series: Maryland leads 12–10

== See also ==
- List of NCAA college football rivalry games
