= 2025 Delaware State Hornets football team =

American college football season

2025 Delaware State Hornets football
- Conference: Mid-Eastern Athletic Conference
- Record: 8–4 (4–1 MEAC)
- Head coach: DeSean Jackson (1st season)
- Offensive coordinator: Nyema Washington (1st season)
- Offensive scheme: Pro-style
- Defensive coordinator: Brandon Blackmon (1st season)
- Base defense: Multiple swarm
- Home stadium: Alumni Stadium

2025 Mid-Eastern Athletic Conference football standings
	Conf.			Overall
Team	W		L	W		L
No. 21 South Carolina State $	5	–	0	10	–	3
Delaware State	4	–	1	8	–	4
North Carolina Central	3	–	2	8	–	4
Howard	2	–	3	5	–	7
Morgan State	1	–	4	4	–	8
Norfolk State	0	–	5	1	–	11
$ – Conference champion; Rankings from STATS Poll

The 2025 Delaware State Hornets football team represents Delaware State University as a member of the Mid-Eastern Athletic Conference (MEAC) during the 2025 NCAA Division I FCS football season. The Hornets are led by first-year head coach DeSean Jackson and play at Alumni Stadium in Dover, Delaware.

== Schedule ==
Date	Time	Opponent	Site	TV	Result	Attendance
August 28	7:00 p.m.	at Delaware*	Delaware Stadium; Newark, DE (Route 1 Rivalry)	ESPN+	L 17–35	17,895
September 6	1:00 p.m.	Albany*	Alumni Stadium; Dover, DE	ESPN+	W 37–32	4,506
September 13	3:00 p.m.	Bowie State*	Alumni Stadium; Dover, DE	ESPN+	W 36–14	2,205
September 20	1:00 p.m.	at Saint Francis*	DeGol Field; Loretto, PA	NEC Front Row	W 39–10	2,007
September 27	12:00 p.m.	at Sacred Heart*	Campus Field; Fairfield, CT	ESPN+	L 31–35	6,456
October 4	1:00 p.m.	at No. 14 Monmouth*	Kessler Stadium; West Long Branch, NJ	FloSports	L 38–49	2,967
October 11	12:00 p.m.	Southern Connecticut*^{†}	Alumni Stadium; Dover, DE	ESPN+	W 70–23	3,385
October 25	1:00 p.m.	at North Carolina Central	O'Kelly–Riddick Stadium; Durham, NC	ESPN+	W 35–26	12,800
October 30	7:00 p.m.	vs. Norfolk State	Lincoln Financial Field; Philadelphia, PA	ESPNU	W 27–20	47,266
November 7	7:00 p.m.	at Morgan State	Hughes Stadium; Baltimore, MD	ESPNU	W 14–12	4,532
November 15	1:00 p.m.	Howard	Alumni Stadium; Dover, DE	ESPN+	W 26–13	2,771
November 22	1:00 p.m.	South Carolina State	Alumni Stadium; Dover, DE	ESPN+	L 17–28	4,077
*Non-conference game; ^{†}Homecoming; Rankings from STATS Poll released prior to the game; All times are in Eastern time

== Game summaries ==
=== at Delaware (FBS, Route 1 Rivalry) ===
Game One – Delaware State Hornets (0–0) at Delaware Fightin' Blue Hens (FBS) (0–0) – Game summary

Quarter	1	2	3	4	Total
Hornets	0	3	7	7	17
Fightin' Blue Hens (FBS)	0	14	7	14	35

at Delaware Stadium • Newark, Delaware

- Date: August 28
- Game time: 7:00 p.m. EDT
- Game weather: Sunny • Temperature: 76 °F (24 °C)
- Game attendance: 17,895
- Referee: Rory Bernard
- TV announcers (ESPN+): Scott Klatzkin (play-by-play) and Fritz Stueber (analyst)

Game information

First quarter

- No scoring plays.

Second quarter

- DSU – Patrick Fisher-Butler 40-yard field goal, 6:46. Hornets 3–0. Drive: 13 plays, 50 yards, 6:12.
- DEL – Nick Minicucci 8-yard run (Nate Reed kick), 3:44. Fightin' Blue Hens 7–3. Drive: 6 plays, 75 yards, 3:02.
- DEL – Kyre Duplessis 4-yard pass from Nick Minicucci (Nate Reed kick), 0:33. Fightin' Blue Hens 14–3. Drive: 11 plays, 77 yards, 2:07.

Third quarter

- DSU – Kaiden Bennett 23-yard run (Patrick Fisher-Butler kick), 10:29. Fightin' Blue Hens 14–10. Drive: 11 plays, 75 yards, 4:31.
- DEL – Ja'Carree Kelly 9-yard pass from Nick Minicucci (Nate Reed kick), 7:15. Fightin' Blue Hens 21–10. Drive: 7 plays, 34 yards, 3:01.

Fourth quarter

- DEL – Kahlil Ali 45-yard interception return (Nate Reed kick), 10:44. Fightin' Blue Hens 28–10.
- DSU – Marquis Gillis 39-yard pass from Kaiden Bennett (Patrick Fisher-Butler kick), 8:10. Fightin' Blue Hens 28–17. Drive: 6 plays, 76 yards, 2:25.
- DEL – Jake Thaw 50-yard pass from Nick Minicucci (Nate Reed kick), 6:15. Fightin' Blue Hens 35–17. Drive: 5 plays, 60 yards, 1:55.

Statistics	DSU	DEL
First downs	21	26
Plays–yards	67–349	70–409
Rushes–yards	41–200	26–137
Passing yards	149	272
Passing: Comp–Att–Int	13–26–2	31–44–0
Turnovers	2	1
Time of possession	31:53	28:07

Team	Category	Player	Statistics
Delaware State	Passing	Kaiden Bennett	11/23, 135 yards, TD, INT
Delaware State	Rushing	Marquis Gillis	17 carries, 123 yards
Delaware State	Receiving	Marquis Gillis	3 receptions, 46 yards, TD
Delaware	Passing	Nick Minicucci	28/36, 251 yards, 3 TD
Delaware	Rushing	Nick Minicucci	9 carries, 44 yards, TD
Delaware	Receiving	Jake Thaw	7 receptions, 92 yards, TD

=== Albany ===
Albany Great Danes (0–1) vs. Delaware State Hornets (0–1) – Game summary

Quarter	1	2	3	4	Total
Great Danes	14	6	0	12	32
Hornets	14	0	10	13	37

at Alumni Stadium • Dover, DE

- Date: September 6
- Game time: 1:00 p.m. EDT
- Game weather: Sunny • Temperature: 89 °F (32 °C) • Wind: SW at 12 miles per hour (19 km/h)
- Game attendance: 4,506
- Referee: Javarro Edwards
- TV announcers (ESPN+): Rodger Wyland (play-by-play) & Michael Johnson Jr. (analyst)

Game information

First Quarter

- ALB – Tavahri Groves 75-yard pass from Jack Shields (James Bozek kick), 14:18. Great Danes 3–0. Drive: 2 plays, 75 yards, 0:42
- DSU – Kaiden Bennett 19-yard run (Patrick Fisher-Butler kick), 8:15. Hornets 7–3. Drive: 6 plays, 80 yards, 1:32.
- ALB – Jack Shields 1-yard run (James Bozek kick), 7:16. Great Danes 14–7. Drive: 13 plays, 50 yards, 6:12.
- DSU – Kaiden Bennett 37-yard run (Patrick Fisher-Butler kick), 1:10. Tied 14–14. Drive: 8 plays, 75 yards, 3:14.

Second Quarter

- ALB – Caden Burti 75-yard pass from Jack Shields (kick failed), 1:03. Great Danes 20–14. Drive: 10 plays, 71 yards, 4:12

Third Quarter

- DSU – Marquis Gillis 26-yard run (Patrick Fisher-Butler kick), 12:00. Hornets 21–20. Drive: 7 plays, 68 yards, 2:50.
- DSU – Patrick Fisher-Butler 34-yard field goal, 4:46. Hornets 24–20. Drive: 13 plays, 50 yards, 6:12.

Fourth Quarter

- DSU – Sean Weston 7-yard run (Patrick Fisher-Butler kick), 9:21. Hornets 31–20. Drive: 16 plays, 86 yards, 7:23.
- ALB – Tavahri Groves 17-yard pass from Jack Shields (pass failed), 8:03. Hornets 31–26. Drive: 4 plays, 75 yards, 1:18
- ALB – Steven Mahar Jr. 7-yard pass from Jack Shields (pass failed), 4:38. Great Danes 32–31. Drive: 3 plays, 13 yards, 1:31
- DSU – Kaiden Bennett 27-yard run (pass failed), 0:34. Hornets 37–32. Drive: 14 plays, 72 yards, 4:04

Statistics	ALB	DSU
First downs	18	30
Total yards	431	548
Rushing yards	101	371
Passing yards	330	177
Passing: Comp–Att–Int	21–35–0	19–29–0
Time of possession	24:50	35:10

Team	Category	Player	Statistics
Albany	Passing	Jack Shields	21/35, 330 yards, 4 TD
Albany	Rushing	Jojo Uga	8 carries, 41 yards
Albany	Receiving	Tavahri Groves	3 receptions, 131 yards, TD
Delaware State	Passing	Kaiden Bennett	17/26, 141 yards
Delaware State	Rushing	Marquis Gillis	23 carries, 123 yards, TD
Delaware State	Receiving	Nathan Stewart	3 receptions, 39 yards

=== Bowie State (DII) ===
Bowie State Bulldogs (DII) (1–0) vs. Delaware State Hornets (1–1) – Game summary

Quarter	1	2	3	4	Total
Bulldogs (DII)	7	0	0	7	14
Hornets	21	9	6	0	36

at Alumni Stadium • Dover, DE

- Date: September 13
- Game time: 3:00 p.m. EDT
- Game weather: Sunny • Temperature: 79 °F (26 °C) • Wind: E at 6 miles per hour (9.7 km/h)
- Game attendance: 2,205
- Referee: Toby Johnson
- TV: ESPN+

Game information

First Quarter

- (14:23) DSU – Phillippe Wesley 64-yard pass from Kaiden Bennett, Patrick Fisher-Butler kick (Drive: 2 plays, 65 yards, 0:37; Delaware State 7–0)
- (12:04) DSU – NyGhee Lolley 58-yard run, Patrick Fisher-Butler kick (Drive: 4 plays, 71 yards, 1:18; Delaware State 14–0)
- (9:29) BSU – Antwain Banks 8-yard pass from Malakai Anthony, Chris Coleman kick (Drive: 7 plays, 37 yards, 2:27; Delaware State 14–7)
- (2:30) DSU – Kyree Benton 20-yard pass from Kaiden Bennett, Patrick Fisher-Butler kick (Drive: 10 plays, 13 yards, 3:07; Delaware State 21–7)

Second Quarter

- (8:35) DSU – Kyree Benton 20-yard pass from Kaiden Bennett, Patrick Fisher-Butler kick (Drive: 4 plays, 33 yards, 1:22; Delaware State 28–7)
- (5:21) DSU – Jadarrius Perkins 0-yard safety (Drive: 1 play, -2 yards, 0:08; Delaware State 30–7)

Third Quarter

- (10:50) DSU – Kaiden Bennett 24-yard run (Drive: 7 plays, 55 yards, 2:50; Delaware State 36–7)

Fourth Quarter

- (11:00) BSU – Micah Robinson 21-yard run, Chris Coleman kick (Drive: 15 plays, 80 yards, 7:12; Delaware State 36–14)

Statistics	BSU	DSU
First downs	20	21
Total yards	382	472
Rushing yards	206	278
Passing yards	176	194
Passing: Comp–Att–Int	28–46–0	18–35–0
Time of possession	29:59	30:01

Team	Category	Player	Statistics
Bowie State	Passing	Malakai Anthony	16/30, 114 yards, TD
Bowie State	Rushing	Micah Robinson	11 carries, 92 yards, TD
Bowie State	Receiving	Joseph Towler	9 receptions, 63 yards
Delaware State	Passing	Kaiden Bennett	17/29, 179 yards, 2 TD
Delaware State	Rushing	James Jones	8 carries, 100 yards
Delaware State	Receiving	Phillippe Wesley	6 receptions, 71 yards, TD

=== at Saint Francis (PA) ===
Delaware State Hornets (2–1) vs. Saint Francis Red Flash (0–3) – Game summary

Quarter	1	2	3	4	Total
Hornets	13	13	0	13	39
Red Flash	0	3	7	0	10

at DeGol Field • Loretto, PA

- Date: September 20
- Game time: 1:00 p.m. EDT
- Game weather: Sunny
- Game attendance: 2,007
- Referee: Travis Barta
- TV announcers (NEC Front Row): Pat Farabaugh (play-by-play) and Jay Roberts (analyst)

Game information

First Quarter

- (7:23) DSU – Marquis Gillis 3-yard run (Drive: 14 plays, 65 yards, 5:31; Delaware State 6–0)
- (0:13) DSU – James Jones 1-yard run, Patrick Fisher-Butler kick (Drive: 11 plays, 73 yards, 4:53; Delaware State 13–0)

Second Quarter

- (13:48) DSU – James Jones 90-yard run, Patrick Fisher-Butler kick (Drive: 1 play, 90 yards, 0:12; Delaware State 20–0)
- (9:49) SFU – Mac Plummer 25-yard field goal (Drive: 8 plays, 56 yards, 3:52; Delaware State 20–3)
- (0:48) DSU – Dasheen Jackson 1-yard run (Drive: 11 plays, 69 yards, 3:48; Delaware State 26–3)

Third Quarter

- (9:26) SFU – Kameron Chisholm 1-yard pass from Nick Whitfield Jr., Mac Plummer kick (Drive: 8 plays, 51 yards, 4:37; Delaware State 26–10)

Fourth Quarter

- (1:37) DSU – Kaiden Bennett 21-yard run, Patrick Fisher-Butler kick (Drive: 9 plays, 80 yards, 4:30; Delaware State 33–10)
- (0:00) DSU – Kaiden Bennett 1-yard run (Drive: 6 plays, 22 yards, 1:23; Delaware State 39–10)

Statistics	DSU	SFPA
First downs	23	16
Total yards	384	333
Rushing yards	292	62
Passing yards	92	271
Passing: Comp–Att–Int	8–21–1	26–36–2
Time of possession	32:04	27:16

Team	Category	Player	Statistics
Delaware State	Passing	Kaiden Bennett	8/21, 92 yards, INT
Delaware State	Rushing	James Jones	8 carries, 137 yards, 2 TD
Delaware State	Receiving	Kyree Benton	1 reception, 39 yards
Saint Francis (PA)	Passing	Nick Whitfield Jr.	26/36, 271 yards, TD, 2 INT
Saint Francis (PA)	Rushing	Nick Whitfield Jr.	6 carries, 28 yards
Saint Francis (PA)	Receiving	Brenden Hodge	9 receptions, 131 yards

=== at Sacred Heart ===
Delaware State Hornets (3–1) vs. Sacred Heart Pioneers (3–1) – Game summary

Quarter	1	2	3	4	Total
Hornets	14	17	0	0	31
Pioneers	7	13	8	7	35

at Campus Field • Fairfield, CT

- Date: September 27
- Game time: 12:00 p.m. EDT
- Game weather: Sunny • Temperature: 75 °F (24 °C)
- Game attendance: 6,456
- Referee: Jonathan Grande
- TV announcers (ESPN+): Randy Brochu (play-by-play), Freddie Coleman (analyst) and Jenna Reynolds (sideline)

Game information

First Quarter

- (14:49) DSU – Marquis Gillis 75-yard run, Patrick Fisher-Butler kick (Drive: 1 play, 75 yards, 0:00; Delaware State 7–0)
- (8:54) SHU – Mitchell Summers 4-yard run, Matt Kling kick (Drive: 11 plays, 75 yards, 5:55; Tied 7–7)
- (6:09) DSU – Kaiden Bennett 4-yard run, Matt Kling kick (Drive: 7 plays, 75 yards, 2:45; Delaware State 14–7)

Second Quarter

- (13:02) SHU – Matt Kling 31-yard field goal (Drive: 11 plays, 53 yards, 4:53; Delaware State 14–10)
- (9:03) DSU – Marquis Gillis 2-yard run, Patrick Fisher-Butler kick (Drive: 11 plays, 65 yards, 3:59; Delaware State 21–10)
- (5:50) SHU – Jack Snyder 15-yard run, Matt Kling kick (Drive: 8 plays, 75 yards, 3:05; Delaware State 21–17)
- (5:39) DSU – Ryan Pellum Taylor 75-yard pass from Jayden Sauray, Patrick Fisher-Butler kick (Drive: 1 play, 75 yards, 0:11; Delaware State 28–17)
- (1:55) DSU – Patrick Fisher-Butler 33-yard field goal (Drive: 5 plays, 12 yards, 2:52; Delaware State 31–17)
- (0:00) SHU – Matt Kling 31-yard field goal (Drive: 10 plays, 61 yards, 1:55; Delaware State 31–20)

Third Quarter

- (3:17) SHU – Jason Palmieri 41-yard pass from Jack Snyder, Tyler Picinic pass (Drive: 10 plays, 80 yards, 4:11; Delaware State 31–28)

Fourth Quarter

- (6:44) SHU – Jason Palmieri 6-yard pass from Jack Snyder, Matt Kling kick (Drive: 15 plays, 55 yards, 7:19; Sacred Heart 35–31)

Statistics	DSU	SHU
First downs	16	29
Total yards	466	456
Rushing yards	253	158
Passing yards	213	298
Passing: Comp–Att–Int	13–19–0	28–36–0
Time of possession	23:09	36:40

Team	Category	Player	Statistics
Delaware State	Passing	Jayden Sauray	12/18, 207 yards, TD
Delaware State	Rushing	Marquis Gillis	13 carries, 123 yards, 2 TD
Delaware State	Receiving	Ryan Pellum Taylor	2 receptions, 85 yards, TD
Sacred Heart	Passing	Jack Snyder	28/36, 298 yards, 2 TD
Sacred Heart	Rushing	Mitchell Summers	20 carries, 74 yards, TD
Sacred Heart	Receiving	Mitchell Summers	4 receptions, 93 yards

=== at No. 14 Monmouth ===
Delaware State Hornets (3–2) vs. No. 14 Monmouth Hawks (3–1) – Game summary

Quarter	1	2	3	4	Total
Hornets	7	14	14	3	38
No. 14 Hawks	14	14	14	7	49

at Kessler Stadium • West Long Branch, NJ

- Date: October 4
- Game time: 1:00 p.m. EDT
- Game weather: Sunny • Temperature: 76 °F (24 °C) • Wind: E at 6 miles per hour (9.7 km/h)
- Game attendance: 2,967
- Referee: Alex Perella
- TV announcers (FloFootball): Matt Harmon (play-by-play), Emory Hunt (analyst) and Brandon London (sideline)

Game information

First Quarter

- (11:55) MONM – Rodney Nelson 5-yard run, Hudson Fiene kick (Drive: 8 plays, 75 yards, 3:05; Monmouth 7-0)
- (6:51) MONM – TJ Speight 38-yard pass from Derek Robertson, Hudson Fiene kick (Drive: 8 plays, 73 yards, 3:05; Monmouth 14-0)
- (1:55) DSU – James Jones 10-yard run, Patrick Fisher-Butler kick (Drive: 11 plays, 76 yards, 4:48; Monmouth 14-7)

Second Quarter

- (11:35) DSU – James Jones 1-yard run, Patrick Fisher-Butler kick (Drive: 10 plays, 70 yards, 3:40; 14-14)
- (9:21) MONM – Gavin Nelson 23-yard pass from Derek Robertson, Hudson Fiene kick (Drive: 7 plays, 75 yards, 2:14; Monmouth 21-14)
- (7:49) DSU – James Jones 3-yard run, Patrick Fisher-Butler kick (Drive: 4 plays, 83 yards, 1:27; 21-21)
- (1:53) MONM – Tra Neal 9-yard pass from Derek Robertson, Hudson Fiene kick (Drive: 7 plays, 38 yards, 3:09; Monmouth 28-21)

Third Quarter

- (11:38) DSU – Kaiden Bennett 7-yard run, Patrick Fisher-Butler kick (Drive: 8 plays, 75 yards, 3:22; 28-28)
- (9:14) MONM – Rodney Nelson 4-yard run, Hudson Fiene kick (Drive: 6 plays, 71 yards, 2:15; Monmouth 35-28)
- (5:23) DSU – Marquis Gillis 8-yard run, Patrick Fisher-Butler kick (Drive: 9 plays, 73 yards, 3:44; 35-35)
- (4:09) MONM – Jack Neri 33-yard pass from Derek Robertson, Hudson Fiene kick (Drive: 3 plays, 75 yards, 1:14; Monmouth 42-35)

Fourth Quarter

- (13:11) DSU – Patrick Fisher-Butler 30-yard field goal (Drive: 12 plays, 69 yards, 5:51; Monmouth 42-38)
- (8:40) MONM – Tra Neal 25-yard pass from Derek Robertson, Hudson Fiene kick (Drive: 11 plays, 75 yards, 4:31; Monmouth 49-38)

Statistics	DSU	MONM
First downs	26	30
Total yards	393	636
Rushing yards	281	252
Passing yards	112	384
Passing: Comp–Att–Int	11-21-0	26-39-0
Time of possession	29:01	30:59

Team	Category	Player	Statistics
Delaware State	Passing	Kaiden Bennett	10/20, 94 yards
Delaware State	Rushing	Marquis Gillis	15 carries, 132 yards, TD
Delaware State	Receiving	Nathan Stewart	2 receptions, 27 yards
Monmouth	Passing	Derek Robertson	25/38, 351 yards, 4 TD
Monmouth	Rushing	Rodney Nelson	32 carries, 203 yards, 2 TD
Monmouth	Receiving	TJ Speight	7 receptions, 145 yards, TD

=== Southern Connecticut (DII) ===
Southern Connecticut Owls (DII) (1-3) vs. Delaware State Hornets (3-3) – Game summary

Quarter	1	2	3	4	Total
Owls (DII)	0	9	7	7	23
Hornets	15	14	14	27	70

at Alumni Stadium • Dover, DE

- Date: October 11
- Game time: 12:00 p.m. EDT
- Game weather: Rain • Temperature: 64 °F (18 °C) • Wind: E at 11 miles per hour (18 km/h)
- Game attendance: 3,385
- Referee: Jason Soistman
- TV: ESPN+

Game information

First Quarter

- (8:31) DSU – James Jones 90-yard run, Dyson Roberts rush (Drive: 2 plays, 95 yards, 0:30; Delaware State 8–0)
- (4:01) DSU – Marquis Gillis 55-yard run, Patrick Fisher-Butler kick (Drive: 4 plays, 80 yards, 1:29; Delaware State 15–0)

Second Quarter

- (14:57) SCSU – 0-yard safety (Delaware State 15–2)
- (11:05) DSU – James Jones 63-yard run, Patrick Fisher-Butler kick (Drive: 1 play, 63 yards, 0:12; Delaware State 22–2)
- (10:21) SCSU – Seth Westover 73-yard pass from John Giller, Daniel Benzi kick (Drive: 2 plays, 75 yards, 0:44; Delaware State 22–9)
- (7:38) DSU – Kaiden Bennett 44-yard run, Patrick Fisher-Butler kick (Drive: 5 plays, 85 yards, 2:34; Delaware State 29–9)

Third Quarter

- (9:51) DSU – Jayden Sauray 81-yard run, Patrick Fisher-Butler kick (Drive: 2 plays, 82 yards, 1:10; Delaware State 36–9)
- (4:59) SCSU – Divine Edwards 20-yard pass from John Giller, Daniel Benzi kick (Drive: 8 plays, 79 yards, 4:46; Delaware State 36–16)
- (2:40) DSU – Maurice Clark 22-yard pass from Jayden Sauray, Patrick Fisher-Butler kick (Drive: 4 plays, 83 yards, 2:12; Delaware State 43–16)

Fourth Quarter

- (11:25) SCSU – Kieran Falzon 4-yard run, Daniel Benzi kick (Drive: 12 plays, 75 yards, 6:08; Delaware State 43–23)
- (7:31) DSU – Alex Perry 1-yard run (Drive: 7 plays, 44 yards, 3:45; Delaware State 49–23)
- (7:16) DSU – Amir Andeson 29-yard interception, Thomas Monnig kick (Delaware State 56–23)
- (2:02) DSU – Kobe Boykin 69-yard run, Dyson Roberts rush (Drive: 3 plays, 80 yards, 1:26; Delaware State 64–23)
- (1:54) DSU – Jadyn Robinson 35-yard pass from Titus Lyles (Drive: 2 plays, 35 yards, 0:14; Delaware State 70–23)

Statistics	SCSU	DSU
First downs	23	22
Total yards	314	781
Rushing yards	70	598
Passing yards	244	183
Passing: Comp–Att–Int	16–27–1	10–12–0
Time of possession	39:16	20:44

Team	Category	Player	Statistics
Southern Connecticut	Passing	John Giller	16/26, 244 yards, 2 TD, INT
Southern Connecticut	Rushing	Kieran Falzon	25 carries, 101 yards, TD
Southern Connecticut	Receiving	Divine Edwards	6 receptions, 93 yards, TD
Delaware State	Passing	Kaiden Bennett	6/8, 93 yards
Delaware State	Rushing	James Jones	3 carries, 158 yards, 2 TD
Delaware State	Receiving	Nathan Stewart	4 receptions, 70 yards

=== at North Carolina Central ===
Delaware State Hornets (4-3) vs. North Carolina Central Eagles (5-2) – Game summary

Quarter	1	2	3	4	Total
Hornets	0	7	14	14	35
Eagles	3	7	7	9	26

at O'Kelly–Riddick Stadium • Durham, NC

- Date: October 25
- Game time: 1:00 p.m. EDT
- Game weather: Sunny • Temperature: 60 °F (16 °C) • Wind: NE at 5 miles per hour (8.0 km/h)
- Game attendance: 12,800
- Referee: Toby Johnson
- TV: ESPN+

Game information

First Quarter

- (3:34) NCCU – Kaleb Robison 33-yard field goal (Drive: 13 plays, 54 yards, 5:56; North Carolina Central 3-0)

Second Quarter

- (9:09) DSU – NyGhee Lolley 0-yard fumble recovery, Patrick Fisher-Butler kick (Drive: 7 plays, 58 yards, 2:34; Delaware State 7-3)
- (5:04) NCCU – Nasim Crosby 32-yard pass from Walker Harris, Kaleb Robison kick (Drive: 8 plays, 75 yards, 4:05; North Carolina Central 10-7)

Third Quarter

- (14:21) DSU – NyGhee Lolley 72-yard pass from Kaiden Bennett, Patrick Fisher-Butler kick (Drive: 2 plays, 75 yards, 0:39; Delaware State 14-10)
- (7:30) DSU – NyGhee Lolley 25-yard pass from Kaiden Bennett, Patrick Fisher-Butler kick (Drive: 10 plays, 89 yards, 5:26; Delaware State 21-10)
- (1:30) NCCU – Walker Harris 1-yard run, Kaleb Robison kick (Drive: 11 plays, 56 yards, 5:52; Delaware State 21-17)

Fourth Quarter

- (14:15) NCCU – Chauncey Spikes 10-yard pass from Walker Harris, Kaleb Robison kick (Drive: 2 plays, 65 yards, 0:39; North Carolina Central 24-21)
- (8:57) DSU – Marquis Gillis 33-yard run, Patrick Fisher-Butler kick (Drive: 11 plays, 87 yards, 5:11; Delaware State 28-24)
- (1:55) DSU – Marquis Gillis 2-yard run, Patrick Fisher-Butler kick (Drive: 8 plays, 79 yards, 5:18; Delaware State 35-24)
- (0:15) DSU – Team safety (Drive: 3 plays, -1 yard, 0:25; Delaware State 35-26)

Statistics	DSU	NCCU
First downs	23	22
Total yards	453	459
Rushing yards	241	105
Passing yards	212	354
Passing: Comp–Att–Int	10–16–1	22–33–1
Time of possession	32:35	27:25

Team	Category	Player	Statistics
Delaware State	Passing	Kaiden Bennett	9/15, 212 yards, 3 TD, INT
Delaware State	Rushing	Marquis Gillis	21 carries, 108 yards, 2 TD
Delaware State	Receiving	NyGhee Lolley	5 receptions, 124 yards, 3 TD
North Carolina Central	Passing	Walker Harris	22/32, 354 yards, 2 TD, INT
North Carolina Central	Rushing	Chris Mosley	18 carries, 83 yards
North Carolina Central	Receiving	Chance Peterson	6 receptions, 134 yards

=== vs. Norfolk State ===
Norfolk State Spartans (1-7) vs. Delaware State Hornets (5-3) – Game summary

Quarter	1	2	3	4	Total
Spartans	0	6	0	14	20
Hornets	3	7	3	14	27

at Lincoln Financial Field • Philadelphia, PA

- Date: October 30
- Game time: 7:00 PM EDT
- Game weather: Cloudy • Temperature: 64 °F (18 °C) • Wind: SW at 5 miles per hour (8.0 km/h)
- Game attendance: 47,266
- Referee: Derek Hatten
- TV announcers (ESPNU): Tiffany Greene (play-by-play) and Jay Walker (analyst)

Game information

First Quarter

- (0:18) DSU – Patrick Fisher-Butler 30-yard field goal (Drive: 16 plays, 67 yards, 7:51; Delaware State 3-0)

Second Quarter

- (9:53) NORF – JJ Evans 13-yard pass from Otto Kuhns, Evan Helfrich PAT failed (Drive: 10 plays, 75 yards, 5:25; Norfolk State 6-3)
- (5:53) DSU – Amir Anderson blocked punt recovered in end zone, Thomas Monnig kick (Drive: 3 plays, -1 yard, 1:05; Delaware State 10-6)

Third Quarter

- (6:37) DSU – Patrick Fisher-Butler 26-yard field goal (Drive: 9 plays, 69 yards, 4:46; Delaware State 13-6)

Fourth Quarter

- (9:40) DSU – Tahmir Ellis 24-yard pass from Kaiden Bennett, Patrick Fisher-Butler PAT failed (Drive: 17 plays, 97 yards, 9:37; Delaware State 19-6)
- (7:20) NORF – JJ Evans 70-yard pass from Otto Kuhns, Marco Peery kick (Drive: 5 plays, 90 yards, 2:10; Delaware State 19-13)
- (6:38) DSU – James Jones 76-yard run, Kaiden Bennett pass to NyGhee Lolley for two-point conversion (Drive: 2 plays, 13 yards, 5:36; Delaware State 27-13)
- (0:54) NORF – DreSean Kendrick 11-yard pass from Otto Kuhns, Marco Peery kick (Drive: 7 plays, 45 yards, 1:48; Delaware State 27-20)

Statistics	NORF	DSU
First downs	22	21
Total yards	356	364
Rushing yards	45	201
Passing yards	311	163
Passing: Comp–Att–Int	22-34-1	17-22-0
Time of possession	27:32	32:28

Team	Category	Player	Statistics
Norfolk State	Passing	Otto Kuhns	22/34, 311 yards, 3 TD, INT
Norfolk State	Rushing	Kevon King	5 carries, 30 yards
Norfolk State	Receiving	JJ Evans	5 receptions, 124 yards, 2 TD
Delaware State	Passing	Kaiden Bennett	16/18, 158 yards, TD
Delaware State	Rushing	James Jones	10 carries, 109 yards, TD
Delaware State	Receiving	Nathan Stewart	4 receptions, 46 yards

=== at Morgan State ===
Delaware State Hornets (6-3) vs. Morgan State Bears (3-6) – Game summary

Quarter	1	2	3	4	Total
Hornets	7	7	0	0	14
Bears	3	0	3	6	12

at Hughes Stadium • Baltimore, MD

- Date: November 7
- Game time: 7:00 PM EDT
- Game weather: Cloudy • Temperature: 55 °F (13 °C) • Wind: N at 10 miles per hour (16 km/h)
- Game attendance: 4,532
- Referee: Toby Johnson
- TV announcers (ESPNU): Tiffany Greene (play-by-play) and Jay Walker (analyst)

Game information

First Quarter

- (14:12) DSU – James Jones 68-yard run, Thomas Monnig kick (Drive: 2 plays, 79 yards, 0:43; Delaware State 7–0)
- (9:51) MORG – Alex Amaya 37-yard field goal (Drive: 10 plays, 41 yards, 4:14; Delaware State 7–3)

Second Quarter

- (14:54) DSU – Amori Francis 0-yard run, Thomas Monnig kick (Drive: 6 plays, 28 yards, 3:24; Delaware State 14–3)

Third Quarter

- (3:14) MORG – Alex Amaya 19-yard field goal (Drive: 5 plays, 18 yards, 1:44; Delaware State 14–6)

Fourth Quarter

- (14:50) MORG – Randall Nauden 67-yard run (Drive: 2 plays, 72 yards, 0:46; Delaware State 14–12)

Statistics	DSU	MORG
First downs	13	16
Total yards	283	285
Rushing yards	114	173
Passing yards	169	112
Passing: Comp–Att–Int	16–25–2	10–24–0
Time of possession	31:59	28:01

Team	Category	Player	Statistics
Delaware State	Passing	Kaiden Bennett	16/24, 169 yards, 2 INT
Delaware State	Rushing	James Jones	13 carries, 115 yards, TD
Delaware State	Receiving	Ryan Pellum Taylor	1 reception, 44 yards
Morgan State	Passing	Raymond Moore III	10/24, 112 yards
Morgan State	Rushing	Randall Nauden	7 carries, 104 yards, TD
Morgan State	Receiving	Joseph Kennerly Jr.	3 receptions, 40 yards

=== Howard ===
Howard Bison (4-6) vs. Delaware State Hornets (7-3) – Game summary

Quarter	1	2	3	4	Total
Bison	0	6	0	7	13
Hornets	0	17	6	3	26

at Alumni Stadium • Dover, DE

- Date: November 15
- Game time: 1:00 p.m. EDT
- Game weather: Cloudy • Temperature: 58 °F (14 °C)
- Game attendance: 2,771
- Referee: Javarro Edwards
- TV: ESPN+

Game information

First Quarter

No scoring plays

Second Quarter

- (10:55) DSU – Patrick Fisher-Butler 34-yard field goal (Drive: 9 plays, 43 yards, 3:09; Delaware State 3-0)
- (6:20) HOW – Matt Conord 28-yard field goal (Drive: 8 plays, 38 yards, 4:19; 3-3)
- (3:01) DSU – Jayden Sauray 5-yard run, Patrick Fisher-Butler kick (Drive: 9 plays, 68 yards, 3:11; Delaware State 10-3)
- (0:29) DSU – Ryan Pellum Taylor 4-yard run, Patrick Fisher-Butler kick (Drive: 4 plays, 61 yards, 0:54; Delaware State 17-3)
- (0:00) HOW – Matt Conord 32-yard field goal (Drive: 6 plays, 59 yards, 0:24; Delaware State 17-6)

Third Quarter

- (7:34) DSU – Wayne Favors III 91-yard interception return, Patrick Fisher-Butler PAT failed (Drive: 14 plays, 62 yards, 7:12; Delaware State 23-6)

Fourth Quarter

- (3:11) DSU – Patrick Fisher-Butler 39-yard field goal (Drive: 9 plays, 40 yards, 3:58; Delaware State 26-6)
- (2:32) HOW – Andre Cooper II 60-yard pass from Tyriq Starks, Matt Conord kick (Drive: 2 plays, 77 yards, 0:29; Delaware State 26-13)

Statistics	HOW	DSU
First downs	22	22
Total yards	295	374
Rushing yards	43	205
Passing yards	252	169
Passing: Comp–Att–Int	21-39-2	10-16-0
Time of possession	25:27	34:33

Team	Category	Player	Statistics
Howard	Passing	Tyriq Starks	21/39, 252 yards, TD, 2 INT
Howard	Rushing	Travis Kerney	8 carries, 30 yards
Howard	Receiving	Andre Cooper II	4 receptions, 117 yards, TD
Delaware State	Passing	Jayden Sauray	7/13, 144 yards
Delaware State	Rushing	Marquis Gillis	16 carries, 92 yards
Delaware State	Receiving	Terrence Rone	3 receptions, 90 yards

=== South Carolina State ===
South Carolina State Bulldogs (8-3) at Delaware State Hornets (8-3) – Game summary

Quarter	1	2	3	4	Total
Bulldogs	7	7	7	7	28
Hornets	3	0	7	7	17

at Alumni Stadium • Dover, DE

- Date: November 22
- Game time: 1:00 p.m. EDT
- Game weather: Cloudy • Temperature: 53 °F (12 °C) • Wind: N at 9 miles per hour (14 km/h)
- Referee: Jason Soistman

Game information
First quarter
- SCST – Jalen Levine 33-yard interception return (Nico Cavanillas Alti kick), 9:29. Bulldogs 7–0.
- DSU – Thomas Monnig 42-yard field goal, 3:05. Bulldogs 7–3. Drive: 8 plays, 45 yards, 3:36.

Second quarter

- SCST – Jordan Smith 10-yard pass from William Atkins IV (Nico Cavanillas Alti kick), 1:10. Bulldogs 14–3. Drive: 8 plays, 79 yards, 3:47.

Third quarter

- DSU – Marquis Gillis 68-yard run (Patrick Fisher-Butler kick), 10:15. Bulldogs 14–10. Drive: 5 plays, 99 yards, 2:29.
- SCST – Johnny Jones 52-yard pass from William Atkins IV (Nico Cavanillas Alti kick), 3:54. Bulldogs 21–10. Drive: 2 plays, 60 yards, 0:40.

Fourth quarter

- DSU – James Jones 10-yard run (Patrick Fisher-Butler kick), 10:56. Bulldogs 21–17. Drive: 5 plays, 51 yards, 1:37.
- SCST – Ryan Stubblefield 5-yard run (Nico Cavanillas Alti kick), 5:11. Bulldogs 28–17. Drive: 11 plays, 75 yards, 5:45.

Statistics	SCST	DSU
First downs	16	22
Total yards	406	526
Rushing yards	157	439
Passing yards	249	87
Passing: Comp–Att–Int	14-24-0	15-33-4
Time of possession	28:40	31:20

Team	Category	Player	Statistics
South Carolina State	Passing	William Atkins IV	14/24, 249 yards, 2 TD
South Carolina State	Rushing	Josh Shaw	16 carries, 99 yards
South Carolina State	Receiving	Nigel Johnson	2 receptions, 74 yards
Delaware State	Passing	Kaiden Bennett	8/20, 59 yards, 2 INT
Delaware State	Rushing	Marquis Gillis	14 carries, 159 yards, TD
Delaware State	Receiving	Kyree Benton	3 receptions, 37 yards

== Offseason ==
=== Transfers ===
==== Outgoing ====
Player	Position	Destination
Michel Bergeron	LS	Howard
BJ Wagner	S	Arkansas State
Kahleef Jimmison	DB	Norfolk State
Erik Sanchez	RB	Saint Francis
Kristian Tate	WR	Troy
Ebubedike Nnabugwu	OL	Unknown
Larrey Williams III	DB	Unknown
Marquise Brunson	DL	Unknown
Amir Anderson	DB	Unknown
Christian Garrett	ATH	Unknown
Ej Core	TE	Unknown
Malcolm Jefferies	TE	Unknown
Joseph Maxwell III	OL	Howard
Geo Fabian	DB	Unknown
Marqui Adams	QB	Unknown
Brian Bates Jr.	LB	Unknown
Isaiah Cook	OL	Withdrawn

==== Incoming ====
Player	Position	Previous school
Quinten Johnson	EDGE	UCF
Elijha Payne	OL	Arizona
Derek Boyd	LB	Hawaii
Rodney Leaks	OL	Houston Christian
Kobe Boykin	RB	Jackson State
Antonio Gates Jr.	WR	Michigan State
Alexander Cobbs	DE	San Jose State
Jason Stone	WR	Thiel
