= 2025 Morgan State Bears football team =

American college football season

2025 Morgan State Bears football
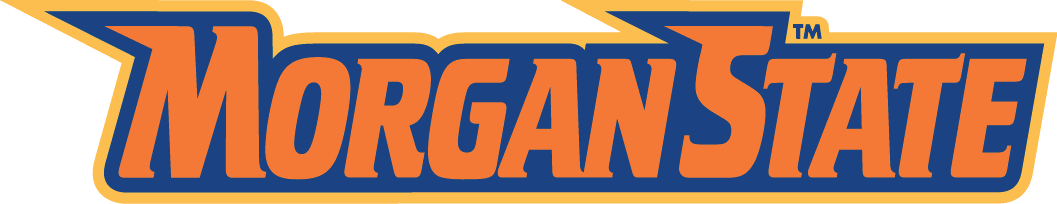
- Conference: Mid-Eastern Athletic Conference
- Record: 4–8 (1–4 MEAC)
- Head coach: Damon Wilson (4th season)
- Offensive coordinator: Apollo Wright (2nd season)
- Defensive coordinator: Antone' Sewell (4th season)
- Home stadium: Hughes Stadium

2025 Mid-Eastern Athletic Conference football standings
| | Conf. | | | Overall |
| Team | W | | L | W | | L |
|---|---|---|---|---|---|---|
| No. 21 South Carolina State $ | 5 | – | 0 | 10 | – | 3 |
| Delaware State | 4 | – | 1 | 8 | – | 4 |
| North Carolina Central | 3 | – | 2 | 8 | – | 4 |
| Howard | 2 | – | 3 | 5 | – | 7 |
| Morgan State | 1 | – | 4 | 4 | – | 8 |
| Norfolk State | 0 | – | 5 | 1 | – | 11 |
$ – Conference champion; Rankings from STATS Poll

The 2025 Morgan State Bears football team represented Morgan State University as a member of the Mid-Eastern Athletic Conference (MEAC) during the 2025 NCAA Division I FCS football season. The Bears were led by fourth-year head coach Damon Wilson, and played their home games at Hughes Stadium in Baltimore.

== Schedule ==
| Date | Time | Opponent | Site | TV | Result | Attendance |
|---|---|---|---|---|---|---|
| August 30 | 7:00 p.m. | at South Alabama* | Hancock Whitney Stadium; Mobile, AL | ESPN+ | L 21–38 | 14,017 |
| September 6 | 7:00 p.m. | Towson* | Hughes Stadium; Baltimore, MD (The Battle for Greater Baltimore) | ESPN+ | L 22–27 | 8,137 |
| September 13 | 3:30 p.m. | at Toledo* | Glass Bowl; Toledo, OH | ESPN+ | L 0–60 | 22,846 |
| September 20 | 12:00 p.m. | Central State (OH)* | Hughes Stadium; Baltimore, MD | ESPN+ | W 27–0 | 245 |
| September 27 | 3:00 p.m. | vs. Miles* | Lucas Oil Stadium; Indianapolis, IN (Circle City Classic) | | W 24–17 | 3,000 |
| October 4 | 1:00 p.m. | at Georgetown* | Cooper Field; Washington, D.C. | ESPN+ | L 24–27 | 1,337 |
| October 11 | 1:00 p.m. | VUL*^{†} | Hughes Stadium; Baltimore, MD | ESPN+ | W 44–6 | 6,500 |
| October 25 | 3:30 p.m. | at Howard | William H. Greene Stadium; Washington, D.C. (rivalry) | ESPN+ | L 27–33 ^{OT} | 9,995 |
| November 1 | 2:00 p.m. | at South Carolina State | Oliver C. Dawson Stadium; Orangeburg, SC | ESPN+ | L 30–36 | 14,061 |
| November 7 | 7:00 p.m. | Delaware State | Hughes Stadium; Baltimore, MD | ESPNU | L 12–14 | 4,532 |
| November 15 | 12:00 p.m. | at Norfolk State | William "Dick" Price Stadium; Norfolk, VA | ESPN+ | W 35–28 | 7,294 |
| November 22 | 12:00 p.m. | North Carolina Central | Hughes Stadium; Baltimore, MD | ESPN+ | L 14–33 | 1,386 |
*Non-conference game; ^{†}Homecoming; All times are in Eastern time

== Game summaries ==
=== at South Alabama (FBS) ===
Morgan State Bears (0-0) at South Alabama Jaguars (FBS) (0-0) – Game summary

| Quarter | 1 | 2 | 3 | 4 | Total |
|---|---|---|---|---|---|
| Bears | 7 | 0 | 7 | 7 | 21 |
| Jaguars (FBS) | 7 | 10 | 7 | 14 | 38 |

at Hancock Whitney Stadium • Mobile, AL

- Date: August 30
- Game time: 6:00 PM CDT
- Game weather: Cloudy • Temperature: 84 °F (29 °C)
- Game attendance: 14,017
- Referee: Michael Farmer
- TV announcers (ESPN+): Pat Greenwood (play-by-play) and Brian Genard (analyst)

Game information

First quarter

- (8:36) MORG – Jason Collins Jr. 2-yard run, Sahr Gbundema kick (Drive: 11 plays, 80 yards, 6:18; Morgan State 7–0)
- (5:01) USA – Kentrel Bullock 1-yard run, Hamilton DiBoyan kick (Drive: 9 plays, 75 yards, 3:35; Tied 7–7)

Second quarter

- (12:54) USA – Hamilton DiBoyan 23-yard field goal (Drive: 5 plays, 13 yards, 2:25; South Alabama 10–7)
- (1:54) USA – Anthony Eager 19-yard pass from Bishop Davenport, Hamilton DiBoyan kick (Drive: 5 plays, 45 yards, 2:01; South Alabama 17–7)

Third quarter

- (10:17) USA – PJ Martin 3-yard run, Hamilton DiBoyan kick (Drive: 10 plays, 75 yards, 4:43; South Alabama 24–7)
- (4:13) MORG – Jason Collins Jr. 3-yard run, Sahr Gbundema kick (Drive: 10 plays, 75 yards, 6:04; South Alabama 24–14)

Fourth quarter

- (9:27) USA – Kentrel Bullock 2-yard run, Hamilton DiBoyan kick (Drive: 2 plays, 4 yards, 0:31; South Alabama 31–14)
- (7:47) USA – Devin Voisin 31-yard pass from Bishop Davenport, Hamilton DiBoyan kick (Drive: 1 play, 31 yards, 0:07; South Alabama 38–14)
- (3:24) MORG – Randall Nauden 7-yard run, Sahr Gbundema kick (Drive: 9 plays, 75 yards, 4:23; South Alabama 38–21)

| Statistics | MORG | USA |
|---|---|---|
| First downs | 17 | 19 |
| Plays–yards | 65–326 | 56–367 |
| Rushes–yards | 40–167 | 41–193 |
| Passing yards | 159 | 174 |
| Passing: Comp–Att–Int | 15–25–1 | 13–15–0 |
| Turnovers | 4 | 1 |
| Time of possession | 33:38 | 26:22 |

| Team | Category | Player | Statistics |
|---|---|---|---|
| Morgan State | Passing | Kobe Muasau | 14/22, 156 yards, INT |
| Morgan State | Rushing | Jason Collins Jr. | 24 carries, 83 yards, 2 TD |
| Morgan State | Receiving | Joseph Kennerly Jr. | 2 receptions, 34 yards |
| South Alabama | Passing | Bishop Davenport | 12/14, 166 yards, 2 TD |
| South Alabama | Rushing | Kentrel Bullock | 23 carries, 127 yards, 2 TD |
| South Alabama | Receiving | Devin Voisin | 7 receptions, 69 yards, TD |

=== Towson ===
Towson Tigers (1-0) at Morgan State Bears (0-1) – Game summary

| Quarter | 1 | 2 | 3 | 4 | Total |
|---|---|---|---|---|---|
| Tigers | 7 | 14 | 0 | 6 | 27 |
| Bears | 3 | 13 | 0 | 6 | 22 |

at Hughes Stadium • Baltimore, MD

- Date: September 6
- Game time: 7:00 PM EDT
- Game weather: Cloudy
- Game attendance: 8,137
- Referee: Derek Hatten
- TV announcers (ESPN+): Phil Schoener (play-by-play) and Emory Hunt (analyst)

Game information

First Quarter

- (4:55) MORG – Sahr Gbundema 38-yard field goal (Drive: 8 plays, 41 yards, 3:25; Morgan State 3–0)
- (4:40) TOW – Lukkas London 96-yard kickoff return, Caden Williams kick (Towson 7–3)

Second Quarter

- (13:54) TOW – Myles Brodie 66-yard interception, Caden Williams kick (Towson 14–3)
- (9:24) MORG – Matt Lowe 5-yard pass from Kobe Muasau, Sahr Gbundema kick (Drive: 8 plays, 63 yards, 4:22; Towson 14–10)
- (3:02) MORG – Jason Collins Jr. 3-yard run (Drive: 9 plays, 60 yards, 4:18; Morgan State 16–14)
- (1:20) TOW – Kemarrion Battles 2-yard run, Caden Williams kick (Drive: 8 plays, 78 yards, 1:37; Towson 21–16)

Third Quarter

No scoring plays

Fourth Quarter

- (4:22) MORG – Jason Collins Jr. 2-yard run (Drive: 9 plays, 52 yards, 3:55; Morgan State 22–21)
- (0:24) TOW – John Dunmore 18-yard pass from Andrew Indorf (Drive: 13 plays, 65 yards, 3:58; Towson 27–22)

| Statistics | TOW | MORG |
|---|---|---|
| First downs | 13 | 20 |
| Total yards | 249 | 417 |
| Rushing yards | 63 | 203 |
| Passing yards | 186 | 214 |
| Passing: Comp–Att–Int | 18–23–0 | 17–28–1 |
| Time of possession | 24:29 | 35:31 |

| Team | Category | Player | Statistics |
|---|---|---|---|
| Towson | Passing | Andrew Indorf | 18/23, 186 yards, TD |
| Towson | Rushing | Kemarrion Battles | 14 carries, 53 yards, TD |
| Towson | Receiving | John Dunmore | 6 receptions, 67 yards, TD |
| Morgan State | Passing | Kobe Muasau | 17/28, 214 yards, TD, INT |
| Morgan State | Rushing | Jason Collins Jr. | 28 carries, 134 yards, 2 TD |
| Morgan State | Receiving | Malique Leatherbury | 4 receptions, 42 yards |

=== at Toledo (FBS) ===
Morgan State Bears (0-2) at Toledo Rockets (FBS) (1-1) – Game summary

| Quarter | 1 | 2 | 3 | 4 | Total |
|---|---|---|---|---|---|
| Bears | 0 | 0 | 0 | 0 | 0 |
| Rockets (FBS) | 3 | 43 | 7 | 7 | 60 |

at Glass Bowl • Toledo, OH

- Date: September 13
- Game time: 3:30 PM EDT
- Game weather: Cloudy • Temperature: 73 °F (23 °C) • Wind: SE at 1 mile per hour (1.6 km/h)
- Game attendance: 22,846
- Referee: Billy Williams
- TV announcers (ESPN+): Jim Barber (play-by-play) and Randy Buffington (analyst)

Game information

First quarter

- (12:37) TOL – Dylan Cunanan 28-yard field goal (Drive: 7 plays, 65 yards, 2:23; Toledo 3–0)

Second quarter

- (14:08) TOL – Junior Vandeross III 12-yard pass from Tucker Gleason, Connor Jones rush (Drive: 2 plays, 12 yards, 0:37; Toledo 11–0)
- (11:07) TOL – Chip Trayanum 1-yard run, Dylan Cunanan kick (Drive: 5 plays, 20 yards, 2:05; Toledo 18–0)
- (8:19) TOL – Kenji Christian 10-yard run, Dylan Cunanan kick (Drive: 5 plays, 36 yards, 1:22; Toledo 25–0)
- (4:54) TOL – Chip Trayanum 1-yard run, Dylan Cunanan kick (Drive: 4 plays, 42 yards, 1:55; Toledo 32–0)
- (2:18) TOL – Kenji Christian 2-yard run, Dylan Cunanan kick (Drive: 3 plays, 60 yards, 1:04; Toledo 39–0)
- (0:07) TOL – Junior Vandeross III 7-yard pass from John Alan Richter, Dylan Cunanan kick (Drive: 10 plays, 67 yards, 1:16; Toledo 46–0)

Third quarter

- (7:50) TOL – CC Ezirim 2-yard pass from John Alan Richter, Dylan Cunanan kick (Drive: 11 plays, 74 yards, 4:35; Toledo 53–0)

Fourth quarter

- (13:48) TOL – Kalieb Osborne 7-yard run, Anthony Ruggles kick (Drive: 11 plays, 80 yards, 5:59; Toledo 60–0)

| Statistics | MORG | TOL |
|---|---|---|
| First downs | 4 | 31 |
| Plays–yards | 48–56 | 84–557 |
| Rushes–yards | 32–36 | 47–260 |
| Passing yards | 20 | 297 |
| Passing: Comp–Att–Int | 9–16–0 | 27–37–0 |
| Turnovers | 1 | 1 |
| Time of possession | 26:01 | 33:59 |

| Team | Category | Player | Statistics |
|---|---|---|---|
| Morgan State | Passing | Kobe Muasau | 6/8, 18 yards |
| Morgan State | Rushing | Dae'Jeaun Dennis | 4 carries, 18 yards |
| Morgan State | Receiving | Joshua Smith | 1 reception, 21 yards |
| Toledo | Passing | Tucker Gleason | 13/17, 174 yards, TD |
| Toledo | Rushing | Kalieb Osborne | 7 carries, 49 yards, TD |
| Toledo | Receiving | Javon Brown | 5 receptions, 94 yards |

=== Central State (OH) (DII) ===
Central State Marauders (DII) (0-3) vs. Morgan State Bears (0-3) – Game summary

| Quarter | 1 | 2 | 3 | 4 | Total |
|---|---|---|---|---|---|
| Marauders (DII) | 0 | 0 | 0 | 0 | 0 |
| Bears | 6 | 14 | 0 | 7 | 27 |

at Hughes Stadium • Baltimore, MD

- Date: September 20
- Game time: 12:00 PM EDT
- Game weather: Cloudy • Temperature: 74 °F (23 °C) • Wind: SW at 9 miles per hour (14 km/h)
- Game attendance: 245
- Referee: Toby Johnson
- TV announcers (ESPN+): Phil Schoener (play-by-play), Abreon Scott (analyst) and Cayla Sweazie (sideline)

Game information

First Quarter

- (11:27) MORG – Tyler Wilkins 30-yard pass from Kobe Muasau (Drive: 4 plays, 76 yards, 1:42; Morgan State 6–0)

Second Quarter

- (13:28) MORG – Joshua Narh 27-yard punt return, Sahr Gbundema kick (Morgan State 13–0)
- (3:47) MORG – Jason Collins Jr. 7-yard run, Sahr Gbundema kick (Drive: 9 plays, 59 yards, 4:11; Morgan State 20–0)

Third Quarter

No scoring plays

Fourth Quarter

- (1:54) MORG – Randall Nauden 1-yard run, Sahr Gbundema kick (Drive: 6 plays, 37 yards, 3:09; Morgan State 27–0)

| Statistics | CEN | MORG |
|---|---|---|
| First downs | 9 | 18 |
| Total yards | 108 | 303 |
| Rushing yards | 15 | 138 |
| Passing yards | 93 | 165 |
| Passing: Comp–Att–Int | 14–23–2 | 17–27–1 |
| Time of possession | 31:54 | 28:06 |

| Team | Category | Player | Statistics |
|---|---|---|---|
| Central State | Passing | Tison Hill | 12/17, 83 yards, INT |
| Central State | Rushing | Dai'Vontay Young | 9 carries, 17 yards |
| Central State | Receiving | Damon Griffin Jr. | 3 receptions, 31 yards |
| Morgan State | Passing | Kobe Muasau | 15/22, 156 yards, TD, INT |
| Morgan State | Rushing | Jason Collins Jr. | 14 carries, 67 yards, TD |
| Morgan State | Receiving | Rahmise Jones | 1 reception, 41 yards |

=== vs. Miles (DII) ===
Miles Golden Bears (DII) (0-4) vs. Morgan State Bears (1-3) – Game summary

| Quarter | 1 | 2 | 3 | 4 | Total |
|---|---|---|---|---|---|
| Golden Bears (DII) | 0 | 0 | 7 | 10 | 17 |
| Bears | 7 | 3 | 7 | 7 | 24 |

at Lucas Oil Stadium • Indianapolis, IN

- Date: September 27
- Game time: 3:00 PM EDT
- Game weather: Indoor
- Game attendance: 3,000
- Referee: Javarro Edwards

Game information

First Quarter

- (0:34) MORG – Raymond Moore III 16-yard run, Alex Amaya kick (Drive: 5 plays, 52 yards, 2:29; Morgan State 7–0)

Second Quarter

- (1:46) MORG – Alex Amaya 23-yard field goal (Drive: 13 plays, 67 yards, 6:58; Morgan State 10–0)

Third Quarter

- (6:07) MORG – Malique Leatherbury 5-yard pass from Raymond Moore III, Alex Amaya kick (Drive: 15 plays, 74 yards, 6:32; Morgan State 17–0)
- (1:40) MILE – Roderick Thomas 2-yard pass from Brinley Vandiver, Reid Grek kick (Drive: 10 plays, 75 yards, 4:27; Morgan State 17–7)

Fourth Quarter

- (11:02) MILE – Glen Williams 67-yard pass from Brinley Vandiver, Reid Grek kick (Drive: 6 plays, 80 yards, 2:53; Morgan State 17–14)
- (5:15) MILE – Reid Grek 33-yard field goal (Drive: 8 plays, 59 yards, 3:10; Tied 17–17)
- (1:17) MORG – Jadon Carter 94-yard blocked field goal return, Alex Amaya kick (Morgan State 24–17)

| Statistics | MILE | MORG |
|---|---|---|
| First downs | 13 | 22 |
| Total yards | 289 | 329 |
| Rushing yards | 29 | 253 |
| Passing yards | 260 | 76 |
| Passing: Comp–Att–Int | 24–38–0 | 11–26–1 |
| Time of possession | 24:37 | 35:23 |

| Team | Category | Player | Statistics |
|---|---|---|---|
| Miles | Passing | Brinley Vandiver | 24/38, 260 yards, 2 TD |
| Miles | Rushing | Roderick Thomas | 8 carries, 14 yards |
| Miles | Receiving | Glen Williams | 9 receptions, 138 yards, TD |
| Morgan State | Passing | Raymond Moore III | 8/21, 63 yards, TD, INT |
| Morgan State | Rushing | Raymond Moore III | 10 carries, 83 yards, TD |
| Morgan State | Receiving | Jahlun Flud | 3 receptions, 30 yards |

=== at Georgetown ===
Morgan State Bears (2-3) vs. Georgetown Hoyas (2-3) – Game summary

| Quarter | 1 | 2 | 3 | 4 | Total |
|---|---|---|---|---|---|
| Bears | 0 | 7 | 17 | 0 | 24 |
| Hoyas | 14 | 0 | 7 | 6 | 27 |

at Cooper Field • Washington, DC

- Date: October 4
- Game time: 1:00 PM CDT
- Game weather: Sunny • Temperature: 75 °F (24 °C)
- Game attendance: 1,337
- Referee: Alexander Randolph
- TV announcers (ESPN+): Jeremy Huber (play-by-play) and Christian Taylor (analyst)

Game information

First Quarter

- (8:26) GTWN – Isaiah Grimes 2-yard pass from Dez Thomas II, Thomas Anderson kick (Drive: 12 plays, 75 yards, 6:34; Georgetown 7–0)
- (1:33) GTWN – Coen Sutton 10-yard pass from Dez Thomas II, Thomas Anderson kick (Drive: 10 plays, 62 yards, 5:04; Georgetown 14–0)

Second Quarter

- (1:24) MORG – Joshua Smith 1-yard pass from Kobe Muasau, Sahr Gbundema kick (Drive: 9 plays, 59 yards, 4:04; Georgetown 14–7)

Third Quarter

- (13:48) MORG – Malique Leatherbury 64-yard pass from Kobe Muasau, Sahr Gbundema kick (Drive: 2 plays, 59 yards, 1:04; Tied 14–14)
- (10:48) GTWN – Dez Thomas II 12-yard run, Thomas Anderson kick (Drive: 7 plays, 75 yards, 2:39; Georgetown 21–14)
- (6:13) MORG – Sahr Gbundema 32-yard field goal (Drive: 10 plays, 71 yards, 4:29; Georgetown 21–17)
- (0:20) MORG – Justin Perry 28-yard pass from Dante Archie, Sahr Gbundema kick (Drive: 11 plays, 98 yards, 4:23; Morgan State 24–21)

Fourth Quarter

- (0:00) GTWN – Jimmy Kibble 49-yard pass from Dez Thomas II (Drive: 6 plays, 65 yards, 0:32; Georgetown 27–24)

| Statistics | MORG | GTWN |
|---|---|---|
| First downs | 12 | 25 |
| Total yards | 341 | 411 |
| Rushing yards | 46 | 200 |
| Passing yards | 295 | 211 |
| Passing: Comp–Att–Int | 22–33–0 | 16–30–0 |
| Time of possession | 26:38 | 33:06 |

| Team | Category | Player | Statistics |
|---|---|---|---|
| Morgan State | Passing | Kobe Muasau | 21/32, 267 yards, 2 TD |
| Morgan State | Rushing | Keith Jenkins Jr. | 8 carries, 24 yards |
| Morgan State | Receiving | Justin Perry | 5 receptions, 127 yards, TD |
| Georgetown | Passing | Dez Thomas II | 16/30, 211 yards, 3 TD |
| Georgetown | Rushing | Dez Thomas II | 13 carries, 71 yards, TD |
| Georgetown | Receiving | Jimmy Kibble | 5 receptions, 110 yards, TD |

=== VUL (NCCAA) ===
VUL Dragons (NCCAA) (3-2) vs. Morgan State Bears (2-4) – Game summary

| Quarter | 1 | 2 | 3 | 4 | Total |
|---|---|---|---|---|---|
| Dragons (NCCAA) | 0 | 0 | 0 | 6 | 6 |
| Bears | 7 | 16 | 7 | 14 | 44 |

at Hughes Stadium • Baltimore, MD

- Date: October 11
- Game time: 1:00 PM EDT
- Game weather: Cloudy • Temperature: 67 °F (19 °C) • Wind: SW at 6 miles per hour (9.7 km/h)
- Game attendance: 7,683
- Referee: Toby Johnson
- TV announcers (ESPN+): Phil Schoener (play-by-play), Emory Hunt (analyst) and Cayla Sweazie (sideline)

Game information

First Quarter

- (10:45) MORG – Randall Nauden 3-yard run, Sahr Gbundema kick (Drive: 3 plays, 10 yards, 1:22; Morgan State 7–0)

Second Quarter

- (12:34) MORG – Raymond Moore III 3-yard run, Sahr Gbundema kick (Drive: 12 plays, 69 yards, 4:30; Morgan State 14–0)
- (7:46) MORG – Keith Jenkins Jr. 9-yard run, Sahr Gbundema kick (Drive: 5 plays, 45 yards, 1:53; Morgan State 21–0)
- (1:50) MORG – Erick Hunter 0-yard safety (Morgan State 23–0)

Third Quarter

- (10:39) MORG – Justin Perry 18-yard pass from Raymond Moore III, Sahr Gbundema kick (Drive: 9 plays, 76 yards, 4:15; Morgan State 30–0)

Fourth Quarter

- (11:36) MORG – Dae'Jeaun Dennis 7-yard run, Sahr Gbundema kick (Drive: 13 plays, 80 yards, 5:57; Morgan State 37–0)
- (7:34) VUL – Jacob Newman 4-yard pass from Max Zavala (Drive: 9 plays, 75 yards, 4:02; Morgan State 37–6)
- (3:12) MORG – Josiah Bushnell 38-yard run, Sahr Gbundema kick (Drive: 8 plays, 83 yards, 4:11; Morgan State 44–6)

| Statistics | VUL | MORG |
|---|---|---|
| First downs | 15 | 29 |
| Total yards | 202 | 538 |
| Rushing yards | 54 | 354 |
| Passing yards | 148 | 184 |
| Passing: Comp–Att–Int | 15–30–1 | 15–24–1 |
| Time of possession | 22:52 | 37:08 |

| Team | Category | Player | Statistics |
|---|---|---|---|
| VUL | Passing | Max Zavala | 15/27, 148 yards, TD, INT |
| VUL | Rushing | Max Zavala | 5 carries, 17 yards |
| VUL | Receiving | Montell Wright | 4 receptions, 71 yards |
| Morgan State | Passing | Raymond Moore III | 13/22, 173 yards, TD, INT |
| Morgan State | Rushing | Dorian Harris | 16 carries, 95 yards |
| Morgan State | Receiving | Justin Perry | 4 receptions, 76 yards, TD |

=== at Howard ===
Morgan State Bears (3-4) vs. Howard Bison (3-4) – Game summary

| Quarter | 1 | 2 | 3 | 4 | Total |
|---|---|---|---|---|---|
| Bears | - | - | - | - | 0 |
| Bison | - | - | - | - | 0 |

at Greene Stadium • Washington, DC

- Date: October 25
- Game time: 3:30 PM EDT
- TV: ESPN+

| Statistics | MORG | HOW |
|---|---|---|
| First downs | | |
| Total yards | | |
| Rushing yards | | |
| Passing yards | | |
| Passing: Comp–Att–Int | | |
| Time of possession | | |

| Team | Category | Player | Statistics |
|---|---|---|---|
| Morgan State | Passing | | |
| Morgan State | Rushing | | |
| Morgan State | Receiving | | |
| Howard | Passing | | |
| Howard | Rushing | | |
| Howard | Receiving | | |

=== at South Carolina State ===
Morgan State Bears (3-4) at South Carolina State Bulldogs (5-3) – Game summary

| Quarter | 1 | 2 | 3 | 4 | Total |
|---|---|---|---|---|---|
| Bears | 0 | 10 | 0 | 20 | 30 |
| Bulldogs | 7 | 21 | 5 | 3 | 36 |

at Oliver C. Dawson Stadium • Orangeburg, South Carolina

- Date: November 1
- Game time: 2:00 PM EDT
- Game weather: Sunny, 65 °F (18 °C)
- Game attendance: 14,061
- Referee: Toby Johnson
- TV: ESPN+

Game information

First quarter

- SCST – Tyler Smith 4-yard run (Nico Cavanillas Alti kick), 11:43. Bulldogs 7–0. Drive: 2 plays, 64 yards, 0:39.

Second quarter

- MORG – Alex Amaya 28-yard field goal, 14:57. Bulldogs 7–3. Drive: 5 plays, 29 yards, 2:36.
- SCST – Tyler Smith 1-yard run (Nico Cavanillas Alti kick), 9:30. Bulldogs 14–3. Drive: 5 plays, 74 yards, 2:02.
- MORG – Justin Perry 38-yard pass from Raymond Moore III (Alex Amaya kick), 8:38. Bulldogs 14–10. Drive: 3 plays, 48 yards, 0:44.
- SCST – Darius Thompson 69-yard pass from William Atkins IV (Nico Cavanillas Alti kick), 3:03. Bulldogs 21–10. Drive: 4 plays, 80 yards, 1:52.
- SCST – William Atkins IV 3-yard run (Nico Cavanillas Alti kick), 0:04. Bulldogs 28–10. Drive: 11 plays, 67 yards, 1:53.

Third quarter

- SCST – Nico Cavanillas Alti 23-yard field goal, 10:15. Bulldogs 31–10. Drive: 10 plays, 69 yards, 4:32.
- SCST – Kwantre Harry Safety, 1:12. Bulldogs 33—10.

Fourth quarter

- SCST – Nico Cavanillas Alti 36-yard field goal, 12:58. Bulldogs 36–10. Drive: 8 plays, 39 yards, 3:08.
- MORG – Dorian Harris 14-yard pass from Raymond Moore III (Alex Amaya kick), 8:29. Bulldogs 36–17. Drive: 7 plays, 70 yards, 4:21.
- MORG – Joseph Kennerly Jr. 25-yard pass from Raymond Moore III (pass failed), 2:03. Bulldogs 36–23. Drive: 7 plays, 55 yards, 2:08.
- MORG – Raymond Moore III 4-yard run (Alex Amaya kick), 1:08. Bulldogs 36–30. Drive: 7 plays, 51 yards, 0:52.

| Statistics | MORG | SCST |
|---|---|---|
| First downs | 18 | 21 |
| Total yards | 394 | 496 |
| Rushing yards | 165 | 133 |
| Passing yards | 229 | 363 |
| Passing: Comp–Att–Int | 17–30–2 | 21–32–1 |
| Time of possession | 30:27 | 29:33 |

| Team | Category | Player | Statistics |
|---|---|---|---|
| Morgan State | Passing | Raymond Moore III | 17/30, 229 yards, 3 TD, 2 INT |
| Morgan State | Rushing | Randall Nauden | 12 carries, 81 yards |
| Morgan State | Receiving | Justin Perry | 4 receptions, 77 yards, TD |
| South Carolina State | Passing | William Atkins IV | 21/32, 363 yards, TD, INT |
| South Carolina State | Rushing | Tyler Smith | 18 carries, 110 yards, 2 TD |
| South Carolina State | Receiving | Jordan Smith | 4 receptions, 107 yards |

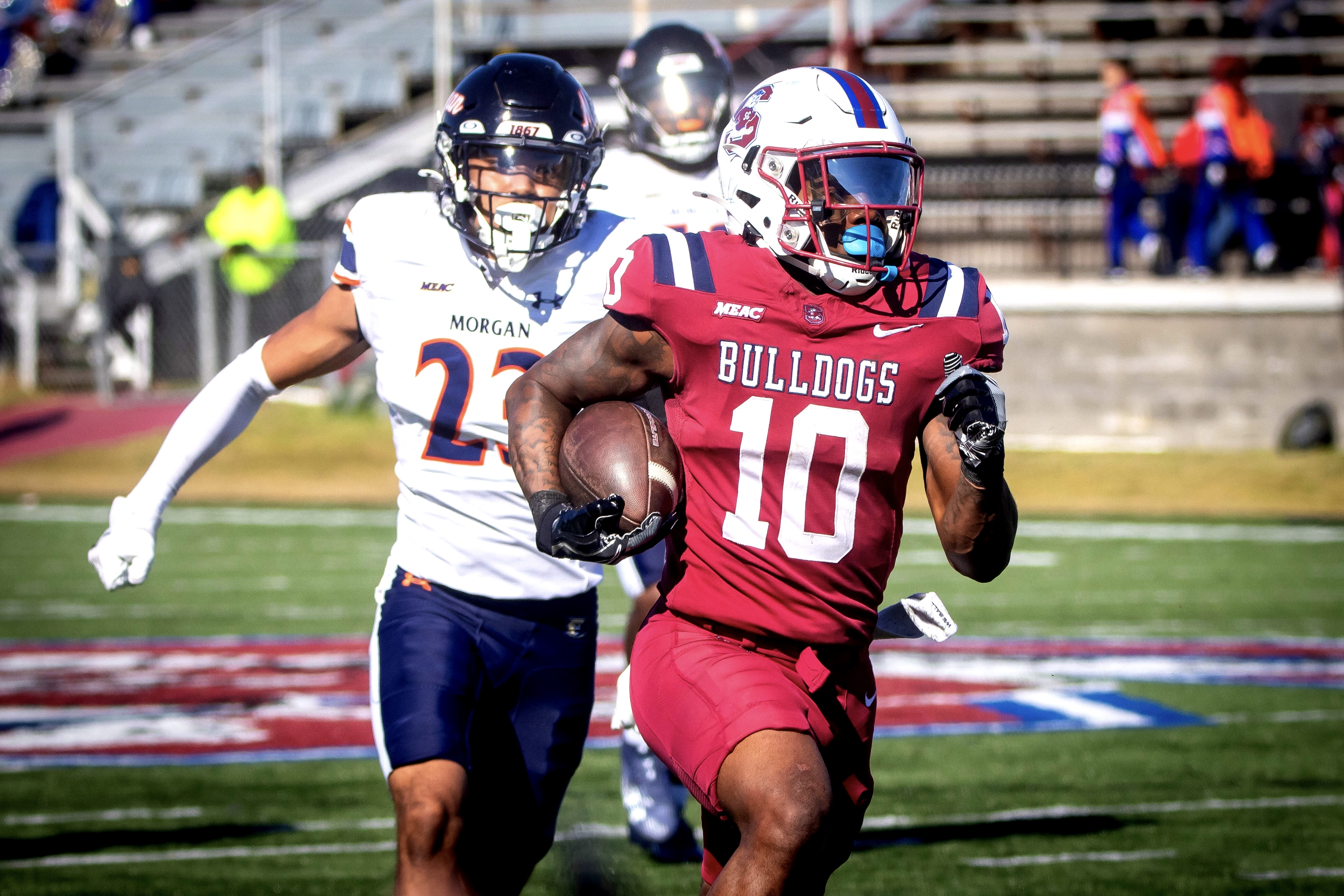
MSU vs SCSU 2025

=== Delaware State ===
Delaware State Hornets (6-3) vs. Morgan State Bears (3-6) – Game summary

| Quarter | 1 | 2 | 3 | 4 | Total |
|---|---|---|---|---|---|
| Hornets | 7 | 7 | 0 | 0 | 14 |
| Bears | 3 | 0 | 3 | 6 | 12 |

at Hughes Stadium • Baltimore, MD

- Date: November 7
- Game time: 7:00 PM EST
- Game weather: Cloudy • Temperature: 55 °F (13 °C) • Wind: N at 10 miles per hour (16 km/h)
- Game attendance: 4,532
- Referee: Toby Johnson
- TV announcers (ESPNU): Tiffany Greene (play-by-play) and Jay Walker (analyst)

Game information

First Quarter

- (14:12) DSU – James Jones 68-yard run, Thomas Monnig kick (Drive: 2 plays, 79 yards, 0:43; Delaware State 7–0)
- (9:51) MORG – Alex Amaya 37-yard field goal (Drive: 10 plays, 41 yards, 4:14; Delaware State 7–3)

Second Quarter

- (14:54) DSU – Amori Francis 0-yard run, Thomas Monnig kick (Drive: 6 plays, 28 yards, 3:24; Delaware State 14–3)

Third Quarter

- (3:14) MORG – Alex Amaya 19-yard field goal (Drive: 5 plays, 18 yards, 1:44; Delaware State 14–6)

Fourth Quarter

- (14:50) MORG – Randall Nauden 67-yard run (Drive: 2 plays, 72 yards, 0:46; Delaware State 14–12)

| Statistics | DSU | MORG |
|---|---|---|
| First downs | 13 | 16 |
| Total yards | 283 | 285 |
| Rushing yards | 114 | 173 |
| Passing yards | 169 | 112 |
| Passing: Comp–Att–Int | 16–25–2 | 10–24–0 |
| Time of possession | 31:59 | 28:01 |

| Team | Category | Player | Statistics |
|---|---|---|---|
| Delaware State | Passing | Kaiden Bennett | 16/24, 169 yards, 2 INT |
| Delaware State | Rushing | James Jones | 13 carries, 115 yards, TD |
| Delaware State | Receiving | Ryan Pellum Taylor | 1 reception, 44 yards |
| Morgan State | Passing | Raymond Moore III | 10/24, 112 yards |
| Morgan State | Rushing | Randall Nauden | 7 carries, 104 yards, TD |
| Morgan State | Receiving | Joseph Kennerly Jr. | 3 receptions, 40 yards |

=== at Norfolk State ===
Morgan State Bears (3-7) vs. Norfolk State Spartans (1-9) – Game summary

| Quarter | 1 | 2 | 3 | 4 | Total |
|---|---|---|---|---|---|
| Bears | 14 | 7 | 0 | 14 | 35 |
| Spartans | 14 | 6 | 8 | 0 | 28 |

at William "Dick" Price Stadium • Norfolk, VA

- Date: November 15
- Game time: 12:00 PM EST
- Game weather: Cloudy • Temperature: 64 °F (18 °C) • Wind: SW at 10 miles per hour (16 km/h)
- Game attendance: 7,924
- Referee: Derek Hatten
- TV: ESPN+

Game information

First Quarter

- (10:29) MORG – Randall Nauden 1-yard run, Alex Amaya kick (Drive: 1 play, 1 yard, 0:03; Morgan State 7-0)
- (6:33) NORF – Kevon King 79-yard run, Marco Peery kick (Drive: 3 plays, 89 yards, 1:23; 7-7)
- (2:32) NORF – Kam'Ryn Thomas 18-yard pass from Vinson Berry, Marco Peery kick (Drive: 6 plays, 51 yards, 2:28; Norfolk State 14-7)
- (0:31) MORG – Joshua Smith 8-yard pass from Raymond Moore III, Alex Amaya kick (Drive: 5 plays, 19 yards, 1:49; 14-14)

Second Quarter

- (6:58) NORF – JJ Evans 17-yard pass from Vinson Berry, Marco Peery PAT failed (Drive: 10 plays, 67 yards, 4:09; Norfolk State 20-14)
- (0:02) MORG – Erick Hunter 90-yard return of blocked field goal, Alex Amaya kick (Drive: 5 plays, 56 yards, 0:29; Morgan State 21-20)

Third Quarter

- (0:17) NORF – DreSean Kendrick 10-yard run, Vinson Berry pass to DreSean Kendrick for two-point conversion (Drive: 11 plays, 80 yards, 5:41; Norfolk State 28-21)

Fourth Quarter

- (10:15) MORG – Justin Perry 13-yard pass from Raymond Moore III, Sahr Gbundema kick (Drive: 9 plays, 65 yards, 5:03; 28-28)
- (6:07) MORG – Raymond Moore III 0-yard run, Sahr Gbundema kick (Drive: 3 plays, 13 yards, 1:38; Morgan State 35-28)

| Statistics | MORG | NORF |
|---|---|---|
| First downs | 21 | 23 |
| Total yards | 345 | 460 |
| Rushing yards | 162 | 286 |
| Passing yards | 183 | 174 |
| Passing: Comp–Att–Int | 16–22–1 | 17–31–2 |
| Time of possession | 32:15 | 27:45 |

| Team | Category | Player | Statistics |
|---|---|---|---|
| Morgan State | Passing | Raymond Moore III | 16/22, 183 yards, 2 TD, INT |
| Morgan State | Rushing | Randall Nauden | 22 carries, 87 yards, TD |
| Morgan State | Receiving | Malique Leatherbury | 6 receptions, 60 yards |
| Norfolk State | Passing | Vinson Berry | 17/31, 174 yards, 2 TD, 2 INT |
| Norfolk State | Rushing | Kevon King | 14 carries, 189 yards, TD |
| Norfolk State | Receiving | JJ Evans | 7 receptions, 98 yards, TD |

=== North Carolina Central ===
North Carolina Central Eagles (7-4) vs. Morgan State Bears (4-7) – Game summary

| Quarter | 1 | 2 | 3 | 4 | Total |
|---|---|---|---|---|---|
| Eagles | - | - | - | - | 0 |
| Bears | - | - | - | - | 0 |

at Hughes Stadium • Baltimore, MD

- Date: November 22
- Game time: 12:00 PM EST
- TV: ESPN+

| Statistics | NCCU | MORG |
|---|---|---|
| First downs | | |
| Total yards | | |
| Rushing yards | | |
| Passing yards | | |
| Passing: Comp–Att–Int | | |
| Time of possession | | |

| Team | Category | Player | Statistics |
|---|---|---|---|
| North Carolina Central | Passing | | |
| North Carolina Central | Rushing | | |
| North Carolina Central | Receiving | | |
| Morgan State | Passing | | |
| Morgan State | Rushing | | |
| Morgan State | Receiving | | |
