= 2025 North Carolina Central Eagles football team =

American college football season

2025 North Carolina Central Eagles football
- Conference: Mid-Eastern Athletic Conference
- Record: 8–4 (3–2 MEAC)
- Head coach: Trei Oliver (6th season)
- Offensive coordinator: Matt Leone (5th season)
- Defensive coordinator: Jesse Thompson (1st season)
- Home stadium: O'Kelly–Riddick Stadium

2025 Mid-Eastern Athletic Conference football standings
	Conf.			Overall
Team	W		L	W		L
No. 21 South Carolina State $	5	–	0	10	–	3
Delaware State	4	–	1	8	–	4
North Carolina Central	3	–	2	8	–	4
Howard	2	–	3	5	–	7
Morgan State	1	–	4	4	–	8
Norfolk State	0	–	5	1	–	11
$ – Conference champion; Rankings from STATS Poll

The 2025 North Carolina Central Eagles football team represented North Carolina Central University as a member of the Mid-Eastern Athletic Conference (MEAC) during the 2025 NCAA Division I FCS football season. The Eagles were led by sixth-year head coach Trei Oliver, and played their home games at O'Kelly–Riddick Stadium in Durham, North Carolina.

== Schedule ==
Date	Time	Opponent	Site	TV	Result	Attendance
August 23	7:30 p.m.	vs. Southern*	Center Parc Stadium; Atlanta, GA (MEAC/SWAC Challenge)	ABC/ESPN+	W 31–14	16,191
August 30	6:00 p.m.	New Hampshire*	O'Kelly–Riddick Stadium; Durham, NC	ESPN+	L 10–27	6,354
September 6	6:00 p.m.	at Old Dominion*	S.B. Ballard Stadium; Norfolk, VA	ESPN+	L 6–54	18,111
September 13	6:00 p.m.	Fayetteville State*	O'Kelly–Riddick Stadium; Durham, NC	ESPN+	W 49–19	7,639
September 20	4:00 p.m.	at North Carolina A&T*	Truist Stadium; Greensboro, NC (rivalry)	FloSports	W 62–20	17,477
September 27	7:00 p.m.	at East Texas A&M*	Ernest Hawkins Field at Memorial Stadium; Commerce, TX	ESPN+	W 50–42	3,284
October 11	3:00 p.m.	at Florida A&M*	Bragg Memorial Stadium; Tallahassee, FL	HBCU Go	W 45–7	10,012
October 25	1:00 p.m.	Delaware State^{†}	O'Kelly–Riddick Stadium; Durham, NC	ESPN+	L 26–35	12,800
November 1	1:00 p.m.	at Howard	William H. Greene Stadium; Washington, D.C.	ESPN+	W 35–14	7,651
November 8	2:00 p.m.	Norfolk State	O'Kelly–Riddick Stadium; Durham, NC	ESPN+	W 31–28	7,225
November 14	5:30 p.m.	South Carolina State	O'Kelly–Riddick Stadium; Durham, NC	ESPN2	L 27–34	7,291
November 22	12:00 p.m.	at Morgan State	Hughes Stadium; Baltimore, MD	ESPN+	W 33–14	1,386
*Non-conference game; ^{†}Homecoming; All times are in Eastern time

== Game summaries ==
=== vs. Southern ===
Game One – North Carolina Central Eagles (0-0) vs. Southern Jaguars (0-0) – Game summary

Quarter	1	2	3	4	Total
Eagles	7	10	14	0	31
Jaguars	7	7	0	0	14

at Center Parc Stadium • Atlanta, GA

- Date: August 23
- Game time: 7:30 PM EDT
- Game attendance: 16,191
- Referee: Y.N. Meyers
- TV announcers (ABC): Tiffany Greene (play-by-play), Jay Walker (analyst) and Quint Kessenich (sideline reporter)

Game information

First quarter

- NCCU – Arthur Rodgers Jr. 1-yard run (Kaleb Robison kick), 7:59. Eagles 7–0. Drive: 13 plays, 80 yards, 7:01.
- SOU – Cam'Ron McCoy 69-yard run (Nathan Zimmer kick), 6:26. Tied 7–7. Drive: 3 plays, 80 yards, 1:33.

Second quarter

- NCCU – Kaleb Robison 24-yard field goal, 3:24. Eagles 10–7. Drive: 12 plays, 75 yards, 6:01.
- SOU – Trey Holly 80-yard run (Nathan Zimmer kick), 1:57. Jaguars 14–10. Drive: 3 plays, 88 yards, 1:27.
- NCCU – Chris Mosley 49-yard run (Kaleb Robison kick), 1:40. Eagles 17–14. Drive: 1 play, 49 yards, 0:17.

Third quarter

- NCCU – Kyle Morgan 3-yard pass from Walker Harris (Kaleb Robison kick), 10:59. Eagles 24–14. Drive: 6 plays, 34 yards, 2:33.
- NCCU – Aleni Mageo 6-yard run (Kaleb Robison kick), 4:50. Eagles 31–14. Drive: 6 plays, 55 yards, 3:12.

Fourth quarter

No scoring plays.

Statistics	NCCU	SOU
First downs	21	15
Total yards	409	337
Rushes–yards	36–223	30–249
Passing yards	186	88
Passing: Comp–Att–Int	22–27–0	13–19–0
Turnovers	1	1
Time of possession	35:06	24:54

Team	Category	Player	Statistics
North Carolina Central	Passing	Walker Harris	22/27, 186 yards, TD
North Carolina Central	Rushing	Chris Mosley	17 carries, 182 yards, TD
North Carolina Central	Receiving	Mehki Wall	2 receptions, 41 yards
Southern	Passing	Cam'Ron McCoy	9/14, 70 yards
Southern	Rushing	Trey Holly	10 carries, 119 yards, TD
Southern	Receiving	Cam Jefferson	3 receptions, 23 yards

=== New Hampshire ===
Game Two – New Hampshire Wildcats (0–0) at North Carolina Central Eagles (1–0) – Game summary

Quarter	1	2	3	4	Total
Wildcats	0	10	14	3	27
Eagles	0	3	7	0	10

at O'Kelly–Riddick Stadium • Durham, NC

- Date: August 30
- Game time: 6:00 p.m.
- Game attendance: 6,354
- Referee: Derek Hatten
- TV announcers (ESPN+): Justin McIsaac (play-by-play) and Brian Espanet (analyst)

Game information

First quarter

- No scoring plays.

Second quarter

- UNH – Nick Reed 29-yard field goal, 9:17. Wildcats 3–0. Drive: 11 plays, 49 yards, 6:20.
- UNH – Denin Limouris 4-yard pass from Matt Vezza (Nick Reed kick), 3:00. Wildcats 10–0. Drive: 8 plays, 49 yards, 4:13.
- NCCU – Kaleb Robison 35-yard field goal, 0:10. Wildcats 10–3. Drive: 13 plays, 57 yards, 2:50.

Third quarter

- UNH – Matt Vezza 8-yard run (Nick Reed kick BLOCKED), 6:40. Wildcats 16–3. Drive: 7 plays, 65 yards, 3:06.
- UNH – Peyton Strickland 65-yard pass from Matt Vezza (Matt Vezza–Colby Ramshaw pass), 1:22. Wildcats 24–3. Drive: 4 plays, 56 yards, 1:17.
- NCCU – Mekhi Wall 65-yard pass from Walker Harris (Kaleb Robison kick), 0:36. Wildcats 24–10. Drive: 2 plays, 77 yards, 0:41.

Fourth quarter

- UNH – Nick Reed 39-yard field goal, 5:32. Wildcats 27–10. Drive: 4 plays, 8 yards, 0:25.

Statistics	UNH	NCCU
First downs	14	16
Plays–yards	56–304	63–275
Rushes–yards	39–118	30–103
Passing yards	186	172
Passing: Comp–Att–Int	10–17–1	13–33–1
Turnovers	0	1
Time of possession	34:52	25:08

Team	Category	Player	Statistics
New Hampshire	Passing	Matt Vezza	10/17, 186 yards, 2 TD
New Hampshire	Rushing	Myles Thomason	22 carries, 76 yards
New Hampshire	Receiving	Caleb Burke	5 receptions, 78 yards
North Carolina Central	Passing	Walker Harris	13/33, 172 yards, TD, INT
North Carolina Central	Rushing	Chris Mosley	19 carries, 106 yards
North Carolina Central	Receiving	Mekhi Wall	1 reception, 65 yards, TD

=== at Old Dominion (FBS) ===
Game Three – North Carolina Central Eagles (1–1) at Old Dominion Monarchs (FBS) (0–1) – Game summary

Quarter	1	2	3	4	Total
Eagles	0	3	3	0	6
Monarchs (FBS)	9	7	28	10	54

at S.B. Ballard Stadium • Norfolk, VA

- Date: September 6, 2025
- Game time: 6:00 p.m.
- Game weather: Partly Cloudy • Temperature: 90 °F (32 °C) • Wind: S 10 mph
- Game attendance: 18,111
- TV announcers (ESPN+): Scott Jackson (play-by-play) and Andy Mashaw (analyst)

Game information

First Quarter

- ODU – Tre' Brown III safety, 5:21. Monarchs 2–0. Drive: 4 plays, -9 yards, 2:00.
- ODU – Trequan Jones 39-yard run (Riley Callaghan kick), 1:59. Monarchs 9–0. Drive: 7 plays, 62 yards, 3:17.

Second Quarter

- ODU – Na'eem Abdul-Rahim Gladding III 6-yard pass from Colton Joseph (Riley Callaghan kick), 2:30. Monarchs 16–0. Drive: 7 plays, 69 yards, 2:26.
- NCCU – Kaleb Robison 39-yard field goal, 0:04. Monarchs 16–3. Drive: 8 plays, 61 yards, 2:18.

Third Quarter

- ODU – Trequan Jones 93-yard run (Riley Callaghan kick), 11:42. Monarchs 23–3. Drive: 1 play, 93 yards, 0:12.
- ODU – Ja'Cory Thomas 4-yard pass from Colton Joseph (Riley Callaghan kick), 7:09. Monarchs 30–3. Drive: 8 plays, 79 yards, 3:33.
- ODU – Colton Joseph 2-yard run (Riley Callaghan kick), 5:19. Monarchs 37–3. Drive: 3 plays, 18 yards, 1:23.
- ODU – TJ Lott 34-yard pass from Colton Joseph (Riley Callaghan kick), 2:24. Monarchs 44–3. Drive: 4 plays, 36 yards, 0:42.
- NCCU – Kaleb Robison 27-yard field goal, 0:13. Monarchs 44–6. Drive: 5 plays, 46 yards, 2:03.

Fourth Quarter

- ODU – Trequan Jones 14-yard run (Riley Callaghan kick), 10:22. Monarchs 51–6. Drive: 5 plays, 47 yards, 1:44.
- ODU – Riley Callaghan 47-yard field goal, 6:13. Monarchs 54–6. Drive: 5 plays, 19 yards, 2:32.

Win Probability

- NC Central +1000 / Old Dominion -2000

Line

- NC Central +21.5 / Old Dominion -21.5

Over/Under

- Over/Under 48.5

Statistics	NCCU	ODU
First downs	13	25
Total yards	237	544
Rushing yards	136	267
Passing yards	101	277
Passing: Comp–Att–Int	13–27–2	22–29–0
Time of possession	31:37	28:23

Team	Category	Player	Statistics
NC Central	Passing	Walker Harris	13/26, 101 yards, 2 INT
NC Central	Rushing	Joshua Jones	9 carries, 65 yards
NC Central	Receiving	Chance Peterson	5 receptions, 46 yards
Old Dominion	Passing	Colton Joseph	19/24, 257 yards, 3 TD
Old Dominion	Rushing	Trequan Jones	5 carries, 163 yards, 3 TD
Old Dominion	Receiving	Ja'Cory Thomas	6 receptions, 86 yards, TD

=== Fayetteville State (DII) ===
Game Four – Fayetteville State Broncos (DII) (0-2) at North Carolina Central Eagles (1-2) – Game summary

Quarter	1	2	3	4	Total
Broncos (DII)	3	0	7	9	19
Eagles	3	18	14	14	49

at O'Kelly–Riddick Stadium • Durham, NC

- Date: September 13
- Game time: 6:00 p.m.
- Game weather: Sunny • Temperature: 77 °F (25 °C) • Wind: NE at 6 miles per hour (9.7 km/h)
- Game attendance: 7,639
- Referee: Jay Edwards
- TV: ESPN+

Game information

First Quarter

- (8:25) NCC – Kaleb Robinson 23-yard field goal (Drive: 10 plays, 31 yards, 4:34; North Carolina Central 3–0)
- (0:15) FSU – John Hernandez-Vargas 40-yard field goal (Drive: 6 plays, 13 yards, 4:23; Tied 3–3)

Second Quarter

- (9:02) NCC – Luke Bracey 7-yard pass from Walker Harris, Kaleb Robinson kick (Drive: 6 plays, 15 yards, 3:18; North Carolina Central 10–3)
- (3:10) NCC – Kaleb Robinson 22-yard field goal (Drive: 8 plays, 48 yards, 3:47; North Carolina Central 13–3)
- (0:30) NCC – Walker Harris 2-yard run, Kyle Morgan pass (Drive: 6 plays, 46 yards, 1:24; North Carolina Central 21–3)

Third Quarter

- (9:41) FSU – Bryce Council 69-yard run, John Hernandez-Vargas kick (Drive: 2 plays, 74 yards, 0:52; North Carolina Central 21–10)
- (2:15) NCC – Quentin McCall 21-yard pass from Walker Harris, Kaleb Robinson kick (Drive: 8 plays, 89 yards, 3:45; North Carolina Central 28–10)
- (2:07) NCC – Tomondrey Braxton 28-yard interception, Kaleb Robinson kick (North Carolina Central 35–10)

Fourth Quarter

- (13:55) NCC – Mekhi Wall 63-yard pass from Walker Harris, Kaleb Robinson kick (Drive: 4 plays, 76 yards, 0:59; North Carolina Central 42–10)
- (7:35) FSU – John Hernandez-Vargas 40-yard field goal (Drive: 13 plays, 43 yards, 6:13; North Carolina Central 42–13)
- (3:09) NCC – Zion Dobson 11-yard run, Kaleb Robinson kick (Drive: 9 plays, 70 yards, 4:20; North Carolina Central 49–13)
- (0:02) FSU – Kahlil Ashley-Diarrah 6-yard pass from Joe Owens Jr. (Drive: 9 plays, 89 yards, 3:02; North Carolina Central 49–19)

Statistics	FAY	NCCU
First downs	10	24
Total yards	234	499
Rushing yards	150	101
Passing yards	84	398
Passing: Comp–Att–Int	10–17–1	24–37–1
Time of possession	29:07	30:53

Team	Category	Player	Statistics
Fayetteville State	Passing	Wilson Kargbo	7/10, 49 yards, INT
Fayetteville State	Rushing	Bryce Council	11 carries, 94 yards, TD
Fayetteville State	Receiving	Kahlil Ashley-Diarrah	3 receptions, 35 yards, TD
North Carolina Central	Passing	Walker Harris	23/36, 387 yards, 3 TD, INT
North Carolina Central	Rushing	Joshua Jones	3 carries, 28 yards
North Carolina Central	Receiving	Chance Peterson	3 receptions, 91 yards

=== at North Carolina A&T (rivalry) ===
Game Five – North Carolina Central Eagles (2-2) at North Carolina A&T Aggies (1-2) – Game summary

Quarter	1	2	3	4	Total
Eagles	-	-	-	-	0
Aggies	-	-	-	-	0

at Truist Stadium • Greensboro, NC

- Date: September 20
- Game time: 4:00 PM EDT
- TV: FloSports

Statistics	NCCU	NCAT
First downs		
Total yards		
Rushing yards		
Passing yards		
Passing: Comp–Att–Int		
Time of possession		

Team	Category	Player	Statistics
North Carolina Central	Passing		
North Carolina Central	Rushing		
North Carolina Central	Receiving		
North Carolina A&T	Passing		
North Carolina A&T	Rushing		
North Carolina A&T	Receiving		

=== at East Texas A&M ===
Game Six – North Carolina Central Eagles (3-2) vs. East Texas A&M Lions (0-3) – Game summary

Quarter	1	2	3	4	Total
Eagles	14	17	16	3	50
Lions	7	14	0	21	42

at Ernest Hawkins Field at Memorial Stadium • Commerce, TX

- Date: September 27
- Game time: 7:00 PM EDT
- Game weather: Sunny • Temperature: 86 °F (30 °C) • Wind: E at 6 miles per hour (9.7 km/h)
- Game attendance: 3,284
- Referee: Craig Helser
- TV announcers (ESPN+): Greg Higgins (play-by-play) and Adam Routon (analyst)

Game information

First Quarter

- (14:24) ETAM – Tanner Harrison 73-yard pass from Ron Peace, Ozlo Rigby kick (Drive: 2 plays, 75 yards, 0:36; East Texas A&M 7–0)
- (10:42) NCCU – Chance Peterson 22-yard pass from Walker Harris, Kaleb Robinson kick (Drive: 8 plays, 78 yards, 3:36; Tied 7–7)
- (3:55) NCCU – Chauncey Spikes 32-yard pass from Walker Harris, Kaleb Robinson kick (Drive: 11 plays, 80 yards, 4:30; North Carolina Central 14–7)

Second Quarter

- (14:56) NCCU – Chris Mosley 3-yard run, Kaleb Robinson kick (Drive: 5 plays, 13 yards, 2:22; North Carolina Central 21–7)
- (11:30) ETAM – EJ Oakmon 3-yard run, Ozlo Rigby kick (Drive: 7 plays, 61 yards, 3:25; North Carolina Central 21–14)
- (6:22) NCCU – Arthur Rodgers 3-yard run, Kaleb Robinson kick (Drive: 9 plays, 75 yards, 5:08; North Carolina Central 28–14)
- (4:52) ETAM – Devin Matthews 59-yard pass from Ron Peace, Ozlo Rigby kick (Drive: 5 plays, 84 yards, 1:25; North Carolina Central 28–21)
- (0:17) NCCU – Kaleb Robinson 20-yard field goal (Drive: 6 plays, 34 yards, 1:04; North Carolina Central 31–21)

Third Quarter

- (10:02) NCCU – Walker Harris 1-yard run, Kaleb Robinson kick (Drive: 10 plays, 44 yards, 4:54; North Carolina Central 38–21)
- (6:25) NCCU – 0-yard safety (North Carolina Central 40–21)
- (2:59) NCCU – Arthur Rodgers 2-yard run, Kaleb Robinson kick (Drive: 9 plays, 78 yards, 3:21; North Carolina Central 47–21)

Fourth Quarter

- (14:13) ETAM – Ron Peace 6-yard run, Ozlo Rigby kick (Drive: 5 plays, 30 yards, 1:56; North Carolina Central 47–28)
- (4:20) NCCU – Kaleb Robinson 24-yard field goal (Drive: 7 plays, 20 yards, 3:37; North Carolina Central 50–28)
- (1:56) ETAM – Devin Matthews 8-yard pass from Eric Rodriguez, Ozlo Rigby kick (Drive: 8 plays, 75 yards, 2:24; North Carolina Central 50–35)
- (0:51) ETAM – Christian Jourdain 21-yard pass from Eric Rodriguez, Ozlo Rigby kick (Drive: 8 plays, 47 yards, 1:03; North Carolina Central 50–42)

Statistics	NCCU	ETAM
First downs	25	22
Total yards	457	490
Rushing yards	169	34
Passing yards	288	456
Passing: Comp–Att–Int	21–34–0	26–51–1
Time of possession	36:57	23:03

Team	Category	Player	Statistics
North Carolina Central	Passing	Walker Harris	21/32, 288 yards, 2 TD
North Carolina Central	Rushing	Chris Mosley	26 carries, 72 yards, TD
North Carolina Central	Receiving	Chauncey Spikes	6 receptions, 113 yards, TD
East Texas A&M	Passing	Ron Peace	19/39, 356 yards, 2 TD, INT
East Texas A&M	Rushing	KJ Shankle	7 carries, 33 yards
East Texas A&M	Receiving	Christian Jourdain	7 receptions, 119 yards, TD

=== at Florida A&M ===
Game Seven – North Carolina Central Eagles (4-2) vs. Florida A&M Rattlers (1-3) – Game summary

Quarter	1	2	3	4	Total
Eagles	7	21	7	10	45
Rattlers	0	0	7	0	7

at Bragg Memorial Stadium • Tallahassee, FL

- Date: October 11
- Game time: 3:00 PM EDT
- TV announcers (HBCU Go): James Hadnot (play by play), Jon Kelley (analyst) and Nicole Hutchison (sideline reporter)

Statistics	NCCU	FAMU
First downs		
Total yards		
Rushing yards		
Passing yards		
Passing: Comp–Att–Int		
Time of possession		

Team	Category	Player	Statistics
North Carolina Central	Passing		
North Carolina Central	Rushing		
North Carolina Central	Receiving		
Florida A&M	Passing		
Florida A&M	Rushing		
Florida A&M	Receiving		

=== Delaware State ===
Game Eight – Delaware State Hornets (4-3) vs. North Carolina Central Eagles (5-2) – Game summary

Quarter	1	2	3	4	Total
Hornets	0	7	14	14	35
Eagles	3	7	7	9	26

at O'Kelly–Riddick Stadium • Durham, NC

- Date: October 25
- Game time: 1:00 p.m.
- Game weather: Sunny • Temperature: 60 °F (16 °C) • Wind: NE at 5 miles per hour (8.0 km/h)
- Game attendance: 12,800
- Referee: Toby Johnson
- TV: ESPN+

Game information

First Quarter

- (3:34) NCCU – Kaleb Robison 33-yard field goal (Drive: 13 plays, 54 yards, 5:56; North Carolina Central 3-0)

Second Quarter

- (9:09) DSU – NyGhee Lolley 0-yard fumble recovery, Patrick Fisher-Butler kick (Drive: 7 plays, 58 yards, 2:34; Delaware State 7-3)
- (5:04) NCCU – Nasim Crosby 32-yard pass from Walker Harris, Kaleb Robison kick (Drive: 8 plays, 75 yards, 4:05; North Carolina Central 10-7)

Third Quarter

- (14:21) DSU – NyGhee Lolley 72-yard pass from Kaiden Bennett, Patrick Fisher-Butler kick (Drive: 2 plays, 75 yards, 0:39; Delaware State 14-10)
- (7:30) DSU – NyGhee Lolley 25-yard pass from Kaiden Bennett, Patrick Fisher-Butler kick (Drive: 10 plays, 89 yards, 5:26; Delaware State 21-10)
- (1:30) NCCU – Walker Harris 1-yard run, Kaleb Robison kick (Drive: 11 plays, 56 yards, 5:52; Delaware State 21-17)

Fourth Quarter

- (14:15) NCCU – Chauncey Spikes 10-yard pass from Walker Harris, Kaleb Robison kick (Drive: 2 plays, 65 yards, 0:39; North Carolina Central 24-21)
- (8:57) DSU – Marquis Gillis 33-yard run, Patrick Fisher-Butler kick (Drive: 11 plays, 87 yards, 5:11; Delaware State 28-24)
- (1:55) DSU – Marquis Gillis 2-yard run, Patrick Fisher-Butler kick (Drive: 8 plays, 79 yards, 5:18; Delaware State 35-24)
- (0:15) DSU – Team safety (Drive: 3 plays, -1 yard, 0:25; Delaware State 35-26)

Statistics	DSU	NCCU
First downs	23	22
Total yards	453	459
Rushing yards	241	105
Passing yards	212	354
Passing: Comp–Att–Int	10–16–1	22–33–1
Time of possession	32:35	27:25

Team	Category	Player	Statistics
Delaware State	Passing	Kaiden Bennett	9/15, 212 yards, 3 TD, INT
Delaware State	Rushing	Marquis Gillis	21 carries, 108 yards, 2 TD
Delaware State	Receiving	NyGhee Lolley	5 receptions, 124 yards, 3 TD
North Carolina Central	Passing	Walker Harris	22/32, 354 yards, 2 TD, INT
North Carolina Central	Rushing	Chris Mosley	18 carries, 83 yards
North Carolina Central	Receiving	Chance Peterson	6 receptions, 134 yards

=== at Howard ===
Game Nine – North Carolina Central Eagles (5-3) vs. Howard Bison (4-4) – Game summary

Quarter	1	2	3	4	Total
Eagles	-	-	-	-	0
Bison	-	-	-	-	0

at William H. Greene Stadium • Washington, D.C.

- Date: November 1
- Game time: 1:00 PM EDT
- TV: ESPN+

Statistics	NCCU	HOW
First downs		
Total yards		
Rushing yards		
Passing yards		
Passing: Comp–Att–Int		
Time of possession		

Team	Category	Player	Statistics
North Carolina Central	Passing		
North Carolina Central	Rushing		
North Carolina Central	Receiving		
Howard	Passing		
Howard	Rushing		
Howard	Receiving		

=== Norfolk State ===
Game Ten – Norfolk State Spartans (1-8) vs. North Carolina Central Eagles (6-3) – Game summary

Quarter	1	2	3	4	Total
Spartans	-	-	-	-	0
Eagles	-	-	-	-	0

at O'Kelly–Riddick Stadium • Durham, NC

- Date: November 8
- Game time: 2:00 p.m.
- TV: ESPN+

Statistics	NORF	NCCU
First downs		
Total yards		
Rushing yards		
Passing yards		
Passing: Comp–Att–Int		
Time of possession		

Team	Category	Player	Statistics
Norfolk State	Passing		
Norfolk State	Rushing		
Norfolk State	Receiving		
North Carolina Central	Passing		
North Carolina Central	Rushing		
North Carolina Central	Receiving		

=== South Carolina State ===
Game Eleven – South Carolina State Bulldogs (7-3) at North Carolina Central Eagles (7-3) – Game summary

Quarter	1	2	3	4	Total
Bulldogs	17	0	3	14	34
Eagles	3	17	7	0	27

at O'Kelly–Riddick Stadium • Durham, NC

- Date: November 14
- Game time: 5:30 p.m.
- Game weather: Sunny
- Game attendance: 7,291
- Referee: Jason Soistman
- TV announcers (ESPN2): Tiffany Greene (play-by-play) and Jay Walker (analyst)

Game information

First Quarter

- (6:34) SCST – Nico Cavanillas Alti 50-yard field goal (Drive: 10 plays, 27 yards, 5:07; South Carolina State 3–0)
- (4:36) NCCU – Kaleb Robison 41-yard field goal (Drive: 6 plays, 51 yards, 1:58; Tied 3–3)
- (0:10) SCST – Deyandre Ruffin 28-yard pass from William Atkins IV, Nico Cavanillas Alti kick (Drive: 9 plays, 75 yards, 4:26; South Carolina State 10–3)
- (0:00) SCST – Nigel Johnson 51-yard pass from William Atkins IV, Nico Cavanillas Alti kick (Drive: 1 play, 51 yards, 0:06; South Carolina State 17–3)

Second Quarter

- (10:44) NCCU – Kaleb Robison 31-yard field goal (Drive: 10 plays, 53 yards, 4:08; South Carolina State 17–6)
- (9:53) NCCU – Eric Adams 33-yard interception, Kaleb Robison kick (South Carolina State 17–13)
- (2:58) NCCU – Chris Mosley 9-yard run, Kaleb Robison kick (Drive: 10 plays, 98 yards, 4:37; North Carolina Central 20–17)

Third Quarter

- (11:39) SCST – Nico Cavanillas Alti 28-yard field goal (Drive: 7 plays, 35 yards, 3:13; Tied 20–20)
- (8:33) NCCU – Mehki Wall 35-yard pass from Walker Harris, Kaleb Robison kick (Drive: 7 plays, 66 yards, 3:00; North Carolina Central 27–20)

Fourth Quarter

- (13:25) SCST – Jordan Smith 24-yard pass from William Atkins IV, Nico Cavanillas Alti kick (Drive: 13 plays, 80 yards, 5:24; Tied 27–27)
- (1:51) SCST – Josh Shaw 30-yard run, Nico Cavanillas Alti kick (Drive: 6 plays, 52 yards, 3:16; South Carolina State 34–27)

Statistics	SCST	NCCU
First downs	24	17
Total yards	454	306
Rushing yards	140	88
Passing yards	314	218
Passing: Comp–Att–Int	24–36–1	13–31–0
Time of possession	36:29	23:31

Team	Category	Player	Statistics
South Carolina State	Passing	William Atkins IV	24/36, 314 yards, 3 TD, INT
South Carolina State	Rushing	Josh Shaw	10 carries, 83 yards, TD
South Carolina State	Receiving	Jordan Smith	7 receptions, 72 yards, TD
North Carolina Central	Passing	Walker Harris	13/31, 218 yards, TD
North Carolina Central	Rushing	Chris Mosley	21 carries, 105 yards, TD
North Carolina Central	Receiving	Mehki Wall	5 receptions, 88 yards, TD

=== at Morgan State ===
Game Twelve – North Carolina Central Eagles (7-4) vs. Morgan State Bears (4-7) – Game summary

Quarter	1	2	3	4	Total
Eagles	-	-	-	-	0
Bears	-	-	-	-	0

at Hughes Stadium • Baltimore, MD

- Date: November 22
- Game time: 12:00 PM EDT
- TV: ESPN+

Statistics	NCCU	MORG
First downs		
Total yards		
Rushing yards		
Passing yards		
Passing: Comp–Att–Int		
Time of possession		

Team	Category	Player	Statistics
North Carolina Central	Passing		
North Carolina Central	Rushing		
North Carolina Central	Receiving		
Morgan State	Passing		
Morgan State	Rushing		
Morgan State	Receiving		
