= 2025 Howard Bison football team =

American college football season

2025 Howard Bison football
- Conference: Mid-Eastern Athletic Conference
- Record: 5–7 (2–3 MEAC)
- Head coach: Larry Scott (6th season)
- Co-offensive coordinators: Da'Vaun Johnson (2nd season); Brett Kean (1st season)
- Defensive coordinator: Kyshoen Jarrett (1st season)
- Home stadium: William H. Greene Stadium

2025 Mid-Eastern Athletic Conference football standings
	Conf.			Overall
Team	W		L	W		L
No. 21 South Carolina State $	5	–	0	10	–	3
Delaware State	4	–	1	8	–	4
North Carolina Central	3	–	2	8	–	4
Howard	2	–	3	5	–	7
Morgan State	1	–	4	4	–	8
Norfolk State	0	–	5	1	–	11
$ – Conference champion; Rankings from STATS Poll

The 2025 Howard Bison football team represented Howard University as a member of the Mid-Eastern Athletic Conference (MEAC) during the 2025 NCAA Division I FCS football season. The Bison were led by sixth-year head coach Larry Scott, and played home games at William H. Greene Stadium in Washington, D.C.

== Schedule ==
Date	Time	Opponent	Site	TV	Result	Attendance
August 30	4:00 p.m.	vs. Florida A&M*	Hard Rock Stadium; Miami Gardens, FL (Orange Blossom Classic)	ESPNU	W 10–9	22,455
September 6	2:00 p.m.	at Temple*	Lincoln Financial Field; Philadelphia, PA	ESPN+	L 7–55	15,655
September 13	1:00 p.m.	vs. Morehouse*	MetLife Stadium; East Rutherford, NJ (HBCU NYC Football Classic)	HBCU Go	W 38–10	16,248
September 20	4:00 p.m.	vs. Hampton*	Audi Field; Washington, DC (The Real HU / Truth and Service Classic)	HBCU Go	W 34–7	18,672
September 27	2:00 p.m.	at Richmond*	E. Claiborne Robins Stadium; Richmond, VA	ESPN+	L 12–13	6,293
October 11	1:00 p.m.	at Sacred Heart*	Campus Field; Fairfield, CT	ESPN+	L 14–32	3,231
October 18	4:30 p.m.	at Tennessee State*	Nissan Stadium; Nashville, TN	ESPN+	L 7–24	14,056
October 25	3:30 p.m.	Morgan State^{†}	William H. Greene Stadium; Washington, DC (rivalry)	ESPN+	W 33–27 ^{OT}	9,995
November 1	3:30 p.m.	North Carolina Central	William H. Greene Stadium; Washington, DC	ESPN+	L 14–35	7,651
November 8	1:30 p.m.	at South Carolina State	Oliver C. Dawson Stadium; Orangeburg, SC	ESPN+	L 12–42	9,892
November 15	1:00 p.m.	at Delaware State	Alumni Stadium; Dover, DE	ESPN+	L 13–26	2,771
November 22	3:30 p.m.	vs. Norfolk State	Audi Field; Washington, DC	ESPN+	W 44–15	1,968
*Non-conference game; ^{†}Homecoming; All times are in Eastern time

== Game summaries ==
=== vs. Florida A&M (Orange Blossom Classic) ===
Florida A&M Rattlers (0-0) vs. Howard Bison (0-0) – Game summary

Quarter	1	2	3	4	Total
Bison	0	7	0	3	10
Rattlers	0	3	0	6	9

at Hard Rock Stadium • Miami Gardens, FL

- Date: August 30
- Game time: 4:00 PM EDT
- Game weather: Cloudy • Temperature: 84 °F (29 °C) • Wind: E at 6 miles per hour (9.7 km/h)
- Game attendance: 22,455
- Referee: Eric Bluntson
- TV announcers (ESPNU): Tiffany Greene (play-by-play) and Jay Walker (analyst)

Game information

First Quarter

- No scoring plays

Second Quarter

- HOW – C. J. Neely 2-yard 2-yard pass from Tyriq Starks (Matt Conord kick), 10:31. Bison 7–0. Drive: 10 plays, 53 yards, 4:49.
- FAMU – Daniel Porto 37-yard field goal, 2:03. Bison 7–3. Drive: 7 plays, 34 yards, 2:35.

Third Quarter

- No scoring plays

Fourth Quarter

- FAMU – Daniel Porto 33-yard field goal, 7:46. Bison 7–6. Drive: 12 plays, 29 yards, 7:37.
- FAMU – Daniel Porto 18-yard field goal, 1:49. Rattlers 9–7. Drive: 11 plays, 61 yards, 4:13.
- HOW – Matt Conord 43-yard field goal, 0:00. Bison 10–9. Drive: 10 plays, 49 yards, 1:49.

Statistics	HOW	FAMU
First downs	12	15
Total yards	195	272
Rushing yards	50	89
Passing yards	145	183
Passing: Comp–Att–Int	17–29–1	17–33–0
Time of possession	26:24	33:36

Team	Category	Player	Statistics
Howard	Passing	Tyriq Starks	17/28, 145 yards, TD, INT
Howard	Rushing	Tyriq Starks	12 rushes, 30 yards
Howard	Receiving	K. D. Mosley	3 receptions, 33 yards
Florida A&M	Passing	R. J. Johnson III	17/32, 183 yards
Florida A&M	Rushing	Levontai Summersett	9 rushes, 37 yards
Florida A&M	Receiving	Jalen Rogers	4 receptions, 51 yards

=== at Temple (FBS) ===
Howard Bison (1–0) at Temple Owls (FBS) (1–0) – Game summary

Quarter	1	2	3	4	Total
Bison	0	7	0	0	7
Owls (FBS)	21	10	14	10	55

at Lincoln Financial Field • Philadelphia, Pennsylvania

- Date: September 6
- Game time: 2:00 PM EDT
- Game weather: Cloudy • Temperature: 88 °F (31 °C) • Wind: NE at 12 miles per hour (19 km/h)
- Game attendance: 15,655
- Referee: Matt Beck
- TV announcers (ESPN+): Shawn Kenney and Jay Sonnhalter

Game information

First quarter

- TEM – Terrez Worthy 13-yard run (Carl Hardin kick), 10:04. Owls 7–0. Drive: 9 plays, 72 yards, 4:51.
- TEM – JoJo Bermudez 24-yard pass from Evan Simon (Carl Hardin kick), 4:37. Owls 14–0. Drive: 6 plays, 63 yards, 3:11.
- TEM – Colin Chase 8-yard pass from Evan Simon (Carl Hardin kick), 0:36. Owls 21–0. Drive: 4 plays, 75 yards, 2:10.

Second quarter

- HOW – KD Mosley 1-yard pass from Tyriq Starks (Matt Conord kick), 9:05. Owls 21–7. Drive: 13 plays, 75 yards, 6:31.
- TEM – Carl Hardin 45-yard field goal, 3:54. Owls 24–7. Drive: 10 plays, 54 yards, 5:07.
- TEM – Kajiya Hollowayne 4-yard pass from Evan Simon (Carl Hardin kick), 0:43. Owls 31–7. Drive: 5 plays, 53 yards, 1:05.

Third quarter

- TEM – Jay Ducker 15-yard run (Carl Hardin kick), 10:32. Owls 38–7. Drive: 2 plays, 47 yards, 0:51.
- TEM – Joquez Smith 12-yard pass from Gevani McCoy (Carl Hardin kick), 0:57. Owls 45–7. Drive: 13 plays, 78 yards, 7:38.

Fourth quarter

- TEM – Carl Hardin 31-yard field goal, 9:42. Owls 48–7. Drive: 9 plays, 19 yards, 5:12.
- TEM – Hunter Smith 65-yard run (Lucas Glassburn kick), 7:17. Owls 55–7. Drive: 2 plays, 63 yards, 0:56.

Statistics	HOW	TEM
First downs	9	28
Plays–yards	48–121	66–560
Rushes–yards	28–82	50–329
Passing yards	39	231
Passing: comp–att–int	8–20–1	14–16–0
Turnovers	1	0
Time of possession	23:46	36:14

Team	Category	Player	Statistics
Howard	Passing	Tyriq Starks	7/14, 39 yards, TD
Howard	Rushing	Travis Kerney	8 carries, 28 yards
Howard	Receiving	John Simmons III	1 reception, 15 yards
Temple	Passing	Evan Simon	8/10, 174 yards, 3 TD
Temple	Rushing	Jay Ducker	10 carries, 87 yards, TD
Temple	Receiving	Xavier Irvin	3 receptions, 78 yards

=== vs. Morehouse (DII) ===
Morehouse Maroon Tigers (DII) (0-1) at Howard Bison (1-1) – Game summary

Quarter	1	2	3	4	Total
Maroon Tigers (DII)	7	7	3	21	38
Bison	3	0	7	0	10

at MetLife Stadium • East Rutherford, NJ

- Date: September 13
- Game time: 1:00 PM EDT
- Game weather: Sunny • Temperature: 79 °F (26 °C) • Wind: S at 2 miles per hour (3.2 km/h)
- Game attendance: 16,248
- Referee: Derek Hatton
- TV announcers (HBCU Go): Charlie Neal (play-by-play), Jon Kelley (analyst) and Lawrencia Moten (sideline)

Game information

First Quarter

- (8:24) HOW – John Simmons III 19-yard pass from Tyriq Starks, Matt Conord kick (Drive: 5 plays, 37 yards, 2:21; Howard 7–0)
- (3:33) MOR – Davis Rowe 43-yard field goal (Drive: 10 plays, 39 yards, 4:51; Howard 7–3)

Second Quarter

- (3:40) HOW – Zaden Jackson 52-yard pass from Tyriq Starks, Matt Conord kick (Drive: 2 plays, 58 yards, 0:41; Howard 14–3)

Third Quarter

- (10:13) MOR – Eric Stephens 24-yard pass from Miles Scott, Davis Rowe kick (Drive: 10 plays, 69 yards, 4:43; Howard 14–10)
- (4:36) HOW – Matt Conord 22-yard field goal (Drive: 8 plays, 24 yards, 3:24; Howard 17–10)

Fourth Quarter

- (14:02) HOW – Anthony Reagan Jr. 1-yard run, Matt Conrad kick (Drive: 4 plays, 35 yards, 1:04; Howard 24–10)
- (12:17) HOW – Tyriq Starks 1-yard run, Matt Conord kick (Drive: 2 plays, 2 yards, 0:41; Howard 31–10)
- (1:16) HOW – Anthony Reagan Jr. 2-yard run, Matt Conord kick (Drive: 13 plays, 76 yards, 6:30; Howard 38–10)

Statistics	MOR	HOW
First downs	23	11
Total yards	425	182
Rushing yards	156	54
Passing yards	269	128
Passing: Comp–Att–Int	20–33–0	10–30–1
Time of possession	31:55	28:05

Team	Category	Player	Statistics
Morehouse	Passing	Tyriq Starks	16/27, 241 yards, 2 TD
Morehouse	Rushing	Travis Kerney	12 carries, 53 yards
Morehouse	Receiving	Andre Cooper II	4 receptions, 80 yards
Howard	Passing	Miles Scott	8/21, 80 yards, TD, INT
Howard	Rushing	Chase DeVaughn	14 carries, 26 yards
Howard	Receiving	Kamrin Brunson	2 receptions, 39 yards

=== vs. Hampton (The Real HU) ===
Howard Bison (2-1) vs. Hampton Pirates (1-2) – Game summary

Quarter	1	2	3	4	Total
Bison	7	13	14	0	34
Pirates	0	0	0	7	7

at Audi Field • Washington, DC

- Date: September 20
- Game time: 4:00 PM EDT
- Game weather: Cloudy • Temperature: 77 °F (25 °C) • Wind: E at 8 miles per hour (13 km/h)
- Game attendance: 18,672
- Referee: Jason Soistman
- TV announcers (HBCU Go): James Hadnot (play-by-play), Steve Wyche (analyst) and Nia Symone (sideline)

Game information

First Quarter

- (13:23) HOW – Travus Kerney 38-yard run, Matt Conord kick (Drive: 3 plays, 65 yards, 1:12; Howard 7–0)

Second Quarter

- (14:50) HOW – KD Mosley 17-yard pass from Kaden Cobb, Matt Conord kick (Drive: 7 plays, 54 yards, 3:21; Howard 14-0'
- (9:11) HOW – Tyriq Starks 15-yard run, Matt Conord PAT failed (Drive: 8 plays, 73 yards, 3:44; Howard 20–0)

Third Quarter

- (6:56) HOW – Travus Kerney 8-yard run, Matt Conord kick (Drive: 6 plays, 75 yards, 2:47; Howard 27–0)
- (0:26) HOW – Billy Roberson II 23-yard run, Matt Conord kick (Drive: 8 plays, 78 yards, 2:47; Howard 34–0)

Fourth Quarter

- (6:56) HAMP – Earl Woods III 53-yard run, Brett Starling kick (Drive: 3 plays, 87 yards, 1:08; Howard 34–7)

Statistics	HOW	HAMP
First downs	24	11
Total yards	456	215
Rushing yards	274	144
Passing yards	182	71
Passing: Comp–Att–Int	13-17-0	8-15-1
Time of possession	35:54	24:06

Team	Category	Player	Statistics
Howard	Passing	Tyriq Starks	12/15, 165 yards
Howard	Rushing	Travis Kerney	16 carries, 113 yards, 2 TD
Howard	Receiving	Montrell Walker	2 receptions, 44 yards
Hampton	Passing	Braden Davis	3/4, 32 yards
Hampton	Rushing	Earl Woods III	1 carry, 53 yards, TD
Hampton	Receiving	Khaioz Watford	2 receptions, 26 yards

=== at Richmond ===
Howard Bison (3-1) vs. Richmond Spiders (2-2) – Game summary

Quarter	1	2	3	4	Total
Bison	0	12	0	0	12
Spiders	0	0	0	13	13

at E. Claiborne Robins Stadium • Richmond, VA

- Date: September 27
- Game time: 2:00 PM EDT
- Game weather: Rain • Temperature: 75 °F (24 °C) • Wind: E at 4 miles per hour (6.4 km/h)
- Game attendance: 6,293
- Referee: Marc Queen
- TV announcers (ESPN+): Bob Black (play-by-play), Chris Anderson (analyst) and Guerin Austin (sideline)

Game information

First Quarter

No scoring

Second Quarter

- (14:16) HOW - Anthony Reagan Jr. 52-yard run, Matt Conord kick (Drive: 3 Plays, 62 yards, 1:08; HOW 7–0)
- (3:14) HOW - 0-yard safety (HOW 9–0)
- (0:23) HOW - Matt Conord 36-yard field goal (Drive: 9 Plays, 45 yards, 2:51; HOW 12–0)

Third Quarter

- no scoring

Fourth Quarter

- (11:50) RICH - Isaiah Dawson 42-yard run, Jayden Alsheskie kick (Drive: 1 Play, 42 yards, 0:11; HOW 12–7)
- (10:17) RICH - Ashten Snelsire 7-yard pass to Aziz Foster-Powell, 2-point conversion failed (Drive: 1 Play, 7 yards, 0:06; RICH 13–12)

Statistics	HOW	RICH
First downs	22	10
Total yards	297	152
Rushing yards	213	117
Passing yards	84	35
Passing: Comp–Att–Int	11–24–2	4–17–1
Time of possession	42:09	17:51

Team	Category	Player	Statistics
Howard	Passing	Tyriq Starks	11–24, 84 yards
Howard	Rushing	Anthony Reagan Jr.	20 carries, 129 yards, 1 TD
Howard	Receiving	Breylin Smith	4 receptions, 27 yards
Richmond	Passing	Ashten Snelsire	4–14, 35 yards, 1 TD
Richmond	Rushing	Isaiah Dawson	1 carry, 42 yards, 1 TD
Richmond	Receiving	Jamaal Brown	1 reception, 12 yards

=== at Sacred Heart ===
Howard Bison (3-2) vs. Sacred Heart Pioneers (4-2) – Game summary

Quarter	1	2	3	4	Total
Bison	7	7	0	0	14
Pioneers	0	3	13	16	32

at Campus Field • Fairfield, CT

- Date: October 11
- Game time: 1:00 PM EDT
- Game weather: Cloudy • Temperature: 65 °F (18 °C) • Wind: E at 9 miles per hour (14 km/h)
- Game attendance: 3,231
- Referee: Michael Davis
- TV announcers (ESPN+): Randy Brochu (play-by-play), Freddie Coleman (analyst) and Morgan Bedard (sideline)

Game information

First Quarter

- (2:02) HOW – Anthony Reagan Jr. 35-yard run, Matt Conord kick (Drive: 2 plays, 38 yards, 0:39; Howard 7–0)

Second Quarter

- (2:05) HOW – Tyriq Starks 14-yard run, Matt Conord kick (Drive: 8 plays, 57 yards, 5:01; Howard 14–0)
- (0:00) SHU – Matt Kling 49-yard field goal (Drive: 3 plays, 30 yards, 0:15; Howard 14–3)

Third Quarter

- (14:48) SHU – Mitchell Summers 80-yard run, Matt Kling kick (Drive: 1 play, 75 yards, 0:12; Howard 14–10)
- (6:20) SHU – Matt Kling 19-yard field goal (Drive: 9 plays, 82 yards, 4:36; Howard 14–13)
- (0:54) SHU – Matt Kling 25-yard field goal (Drive: 8 plays, 26 yards, 3:25; Sacred Heart 16–14)

Fourth Quarter

- (7:36) SHU – Payton Rhoades 15-yard pass from Jack Snyder, Matt Kling kick (Drive: 11 plays, 54 yards, 5:58; Sacred Heart 23–14)
- (3:26) SHU – Mitchell Summers 49-yard run, Matt Kling kick (Drive: 2 plays, 48 yards, 0:50; Sacred Heart 30–14)
- (3:04) SHU – Peter Schanne 0-yard safety (Sacred Heart 32–14)

Statistics	HOW	SHU
First downs	12	21
Total yards	233	476
Rushing yards	153	329
Passing yards	80	147
Passing: Comp–Att–Int	11–21–0	11–18–0
Time of possession	29:27	30:33

Team	Category	Player	Statistics
Howard	Passing	Tyriq Starks	11/21, 80 yards
Howard	Rushing	Anthony Reagan Jr.	17 carries, 116 yards, TD
Howard	Receiving	Anthony Reagan Jr.	4 receptions, 39 yards
Sacred Heart	Passing	Jack Snyder	11/18, 147 yards, TD
Sacred Heart	Rushing	Mitchell Summers	18 carries, 243 yards, 2 TD
Sacred Heart	Receiving	Payton Rhoades	4 receptions, 71 yards, TD

=== at Tennessee State ===
Howard Bison (3-3) vs. Tennessee State Tigers (1-5) – Game summary

Quarter	1	2	3	4	Total
Bison	0	7	0	0	7
Tigers	7	7	7	3	24

at Nissan Stadium • Nashville, TN

- Date: October 18
- Game time: 4:30 PM CDT
- Game weather: Sunny • Temperature: 82 °F (28 °C) • Wind: SW at 14 miles per hour (23 km/h)
- Game attendance: 14,056
- Referee: Matt Jones
- TV announcers (ESPN+): Dan Laing (play-by-play) and Dean Cokinos (analyst)

Game information

First Quarter

- (10:59) TNST – Snap Reed 10-yard pass from Byron McNair, Freddy Perez kick (Drive: 6 plays, 79 yards, 3:54; Tennessee State 7–0)

Second Quarter

- (7:01) HOW – Anthony Reagan Jr. 2-yard run, Matt Conord kick (Drive: 9 plays, 32 yards, 5:16; Tied 7–7)
- (0:24) TNST – Connor Ruth 6-yard pass from Byron McNair, Freddy Perez kick (Drive: 5 plays, 32 yards, 1:27; Tennessee State 14–7)

Third Quarter

- (1:28) TNST – DeVaughn Slaughter 8-yard pass from Byron McNair, Freddy Perez kick (Drive: 6 plays, 51 yards, 3:34; Tennessee State 21–7)

Fourth Quarter

- (3:17) TNST – Freddy Perez 34-yard field goal (Drive: 4 plays, -1 yards, 1:02; Tennessee State 24–7)

Statistics	HOW	TNST
First downs	10	7
Total yards	183	262
Rushing yards	67	88
Passing yards	116	174
Passing: Comp–Att–Int	14–27–2	18–22–0
Time of possession	31:37	28:23

Team	Category	Player	Statistics
Howard	Passing	Tyriq Starks	14/27, 116 yards, 2 INT
Howard	Rushing	Anthony Reagan Jr.	12 carries, 44 yards, TD
Howard	Receiving	CJ Neely	4 receptions, 56 yards
Tennessee State	Passing	Byron McNair	18/22, 174 yards, 3 TD
Tennessee State	Rushing	Byron McNair	6 carries, 47 yards
Tennessee State	Receiving	Kendric Rhymes	2 receptions, 46 yards

=== Morgan State (rivalry) ===
Morgan State Bears (3-4) vs. Howard Bison (3-4) – Game summary

Quarter	1	2	3	4	Total
Bears	-	-	-	-	0
Bison	-	-	-	-	0

at Greene Stadium • Washington, DC

- Date: October 25
- Game time: 3:30 p.m. EDT
- TV: ESPN+

Statistics	MORG	HOW
First downs		
Total yards		
Rushing yards		
Passing yards		
Passing: Comp–Att–Int		
Time of possession		

Team	Category	Player	Statistics
Morgan State	Passing		
Morgan State	Rushing		
Morgan State	Receiving		
Howard	Passing		
Howard	Rushing		
Howard	Receiving		

=== North Carolina Central ===
North Carolina Central Eagles (5-3) vs. Howard Bison (4-4) – Game summary

Quarter	1	2	3	4	Total
Eagles	-	-	-	-	0
Bison	-	-	-	-	0

at Greene Stadium • Washington, DC

- Date: November 1
- Game time: 3:30 p.m. EDT
- TV: ESPN+

Statistics	NCCU	HOW
First downs		
Total yards		
Rushing yards		
Passing yards		
Passing: Comp–Att–Int		
Time of possession		

Team	Category	Player	Statistics
North Carolina Central	Passing		
North Carolina Central	Rushing		
North Carolina Central	Receiving		
Howard	Passing		
Howard	Rushing		
Howard	Receiving		

=== at South Carolina State ===
Howard Bison (4-5) at South Carolina State Bulldogs (6-3) – Game summary

Quarter	1	2	3	4	Total
Bison	0	3	0	9	12
Bulldogs	21	7	14	0	42

at Oliver C. Dawson Stadium • Orangeburg, South Carolina

- Date: November 8
- Game time: 1:30 p.m. EST
- Game weather: Sunny, 75 °F (24 °C)
- Game attendance: 9,892
- Referee: David Cardell
- TV: ESPN+

Game information

First quarter

- SCST – Josh Shaw 1-yard run (Nico Cavanillas Alti kick), 10:15. Bulldogs 7–0. Drive: 6 plays, 60 yards, 2:57.
- SCST – Jarod Washington 27-yard interception return (Nico Cavanillas Alti kick), 9:23. Bulldogs 14–0.
- SCST – Jordan Smith 43-yard pass from William Atkins IV (Nico Cavanillas Alti kick), 1:45. Bulldogs 21–0. Drive: 7 plays, 72 yards, 3:26.

Second quarter

- HOW – Matt Conord 38-yard field goal, 14:16. Bulldogs 21–3. Drive: 5 plays, 26 yards, 2:21.
- SCST – Jarod Washington 56-yard blocked field goal return (Nico Cavanillas Alti kick), 0:04. Bulldogs 28–3.

Third quarter

- SCST – Jalen Johnson 34-yard pass from William Atkins IV (Nico Cavanillas Alti kick), 9:29. Bulldogs 35–3. Drive: 3 plays, 50 yards, 1:02.
- SCST – Jordan Smith 6-yard run (Nico Cavanillas Alti kick), 4:44. Bulldogs 42–3. Drive: 6 plays, 55 yards, 3:23.

Fourth quarter

- HOW – Team Safety, 5:03. Bulldogs 42–5.
- HOW – Eric Slater 48-yard pass from Terrell Russell (Matt Conord kick), 4:04. Bulldogs 42–12. Drive: 2 plays, 49 yards, 0:49.

Statistics	HOW	SCST
First downs	13	17
Total yards	209	337
Rushing yards	63	116
Passing yards	146	221
Passing: Comp–Att–Int	9–30–1	16–26–2
Time of possession	30:44	29:16

Team	Category	Player	Statistics
Howard	Passing	Tyriq Starks	7/22, 97 yards, INT
Howard	Rushing	Anthony Reagan Jr.	12 carries, 34 yards
Howard	Receiving	Eric Slater	1 reception, 48 yards, TD
South Carolina State	Passing	William Atkins IV	15/23, 213 yards, TD, INT
South Carolina State	Rushing	Josh Shaw	9 carries, 64 yards, TD
South Carolina State	Receiving	Jalen Johnson	6 receptions, 87 yards, TD

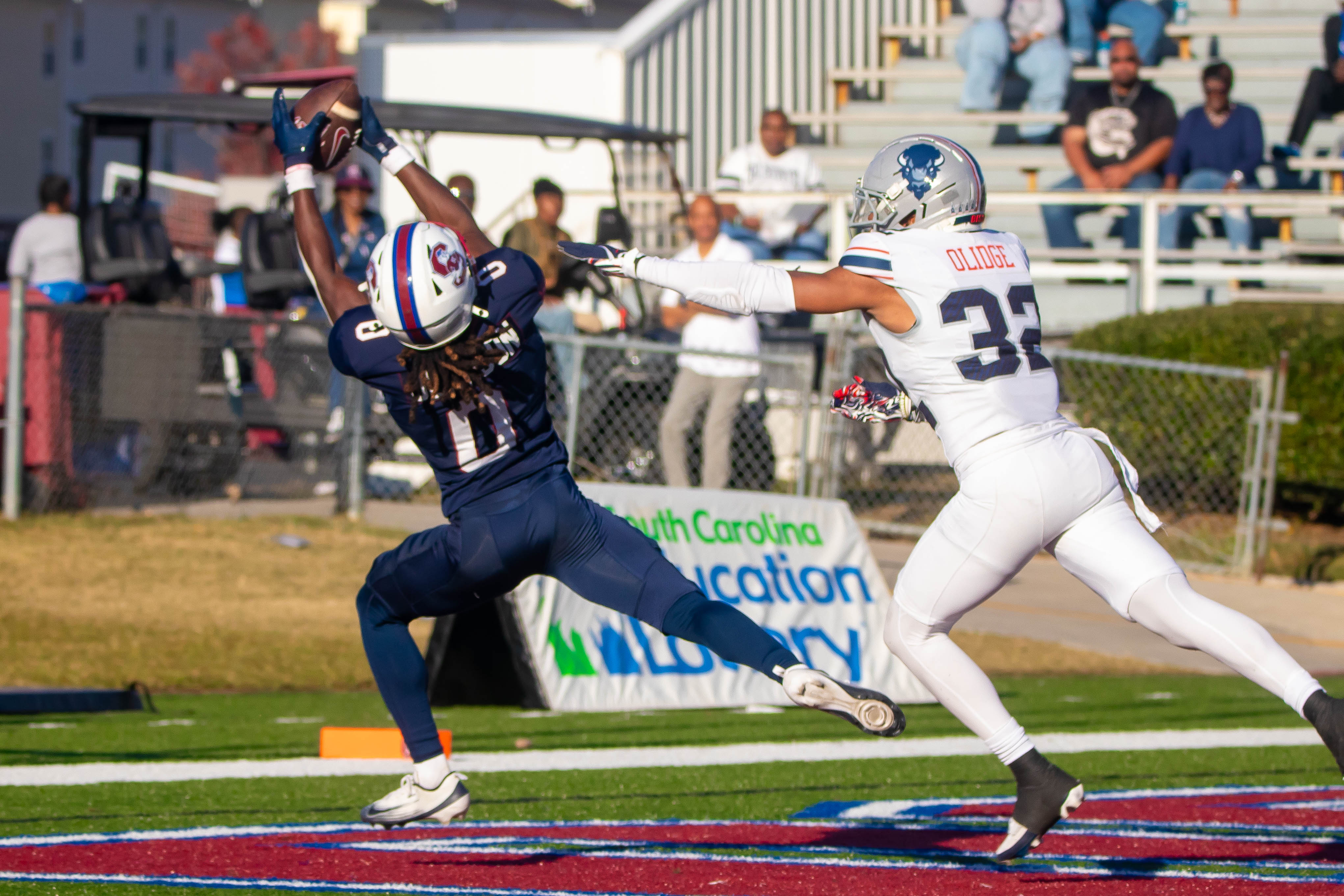
HU vs SCSU 2025

=== at Delaware State ===
Howard Bison (4-6) vs. Delaware State Hornets (7-3) – Game summary

Quarter	1	2	3	4	Total
Bison	-	-	-	-	0
Hornets	-	-	-	-	0

at Alumni Stadium • Dover, DE

- Date: November 15
- Game time: 1:00 p.m. EDT
- TV: ESPN+

Statistics	HOW	DSU
First downs		
Total yards		
Rushing yards		
Passing yards		
Passing: Comp–Att–Int		
Time of possession		

Team	Category	Player	Statistics
Howard	Passing		
Howard	Rushing		
Howard	Receiving		
Delaware State	Passing		
Delaware State	Rushing		
Delaware State	Receiving		

=== vs. Norfolk State ===
Norfolk State Spartans (0-0) vs. Howard Bison (0-0) – Game summary

Quarter	1	2	3	4	Total
Spartans	-	-	-	-	0
Bison	-	-	-	-	0

at Audi Field • Washington, DC

- Date: November 22
- Game time: 3:30 p.m. EDT
- TV announcers (ESPN+): Trevin A. Jones (play by play) and Nate Henry (analyst)

Statistics	NORF	HOW
First downs		
Total yards		
Rushing yards		
Passing yards		
Passing: Comp–Att–Int		
Time of possession		

Team	Category	Player	Statistics
Norfolk State	Passing		
Norfolk State	Rushing		
Norfolk State	Receiving		
Howard	Passing		
Howard	Rushing		
Howard	Receiving		
