= Kaj =

Kaj may refer to:

== Places ==
- Kaj River, a river of Afghanistan

=== Places in Iran ===
- Kaj, Chaharmahal and Bakhtiari
- Kaj, Hamadan
- Kaj, Isfahan
- Kaj, Qom
- Kaj, Razavi Khorasan
- Kaj, Sistan and Baluchestan

== People and characters ==
- Kaj (name)
- A fictional frog on the Danish TV series Kaj & Andrea
- Kareem Abdul-Jabbar, American basketball player
- The pen name of Kazimierz Andrzej Jaworski, a Polish author and publisher

== Other uses ==
- KAJ (group), a musical trio from Finland
- Kaj, a conjunction in Esperanto

== See also ==
- KAJ (disambiguation)
- Kai (disambiguation)
- Kay (disambiguation)
