= Kaj (name) =

Kaj is a given name of unknown origin, particularly common in the Nordic countries, loaned from the Continent. It might be derived from Frisian Kaye (hen) or Latin Caius. In Denmark, Finland and Norway, the name is predominantly male, while in Sweden the name is unisex (with the female name possibly having a different origin).

Notable persons with the given name include:

== Given name ==
- Kaj Arnö (born 1963), Finland-Swedish IT-entrepreneur
- Kaj Birket-Smith (1893–1977), Danish philologist and anthropologist
- Kaj Birksted (1915–1996), Danish fighter pilot
- Kaj Björk (1918–2014), Swedish Social Democratic politician
- Kaj Busch (21st century), Australian television presenter
- Kaj Christiansen (1921–2008), Danish football forward
- Kaj Chydenius (1939–2024), Finnish composer
- Kaj Czarnecki (1936–2018), Finnish Olympic fencer
- Kaj Falkman (1934–2018), Swedish diplomat
- Kaj Franck (1911–1989), Finnish designer
- Kaj Gnudtzmann (1880–1948), Danish gymnast
- Kaj Aksel Hansen (1917–1987), Danish footballer
- Kaj Hansen (footballer born 1940) (1940–2009), Danish footballer
- Kaj Hasselriis (born 1974), Canadian journalist
- Kaj Ikast (1935–2020), Danish politician
- Niels Kaj Jerne (1911–1994), Danish immunologist
- Kaj Leo Johannesen (born 1964), Prime Minister of the Faroe Islands
- Kølig Kaj (born 1971), artist name, meaning "cool Kaj", for the Danish rapper Thomas Lægård
- Kaj Ulrik Linderstrøm-Lang (1896–1959), Danish scientist
- Kaj Munk (1898–1944), Danish playwright
- Kaj Poulsen (born 1942), Danish footballer in the striker position
- Kaj Ramsteijn (born 1990), Dutch footballer
- Kaj Sanders (born 2006), American football player
- Kaj Schmidt (1926–2004), Danish Olympic sprint canoer who competed in the early 1960s
- Kaj Skagen (born 1949), Norwegian writer
- Kaj Stenvall (born 1951), Finnish artist
- Kaj Sundberg (1924–1993), Swedish diplomat
- Kaj Aage Gunnar Strand (1907–2000), Danish astronomer
- Kaj Sylvan (1923–2020), Danish Olympic sprint canoer who competed in the late 1950s
- Kaj Uldaler (1906–1987), Danish amateur football player

== Surname ==
- András Kaj (born 1977), Hungarian footballer

== See also ==
- Kai (name)
- Kaja (name)
- Kaj (disambiguation)
