= 2025 Norfolk State Spartans football team =

American college football season

2025 Norfolk State Spartans football
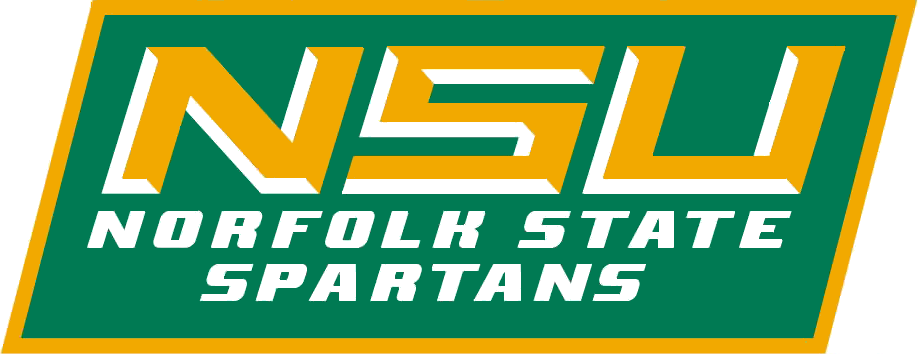
- Conference: Mid-Eastern Athletic Conference
- Record: 1–11 (0–5 MEAC)
- Head coach: Michael Vick (1st season)
- Offensive coordinator: Brian Sheppard (1st season)
- Defensive coordinator: Terence Garvin (1st season)
- Home stadium: William "Dick" Price Stadium

2025 Mid-Eastern Athletic Conference football standings
	Conf.			Overall
Team	W		L	W		L
No. 21 South Carolina State $	5	–	0	10	–	3
Delaware State	4	–	1	8	–	4
North Carolina Central	3	–	2	8	–	4
Howard	2	–	3	5	–	7
Morgan State	1	–	4	4	–	8
Norfolk State	0	–	5	1	–	11
$ – Conference champion; Rankings from STATS Poll

The 2025 Norfolk State Spartans football team represented Norfolk State University as a member of the Mid-Eastern Athletic Conference (MEAC) during the 2025 NCAA Division I FCS football season. The Spartans were led by first-year head coach Michael Vick and played their home games at William "Dick" Price Stadium in Norfolk, Virginia.

== Offseason ==
=== Transfers ===
==== Outgoing ====
Player	Position	Destination
Jaden Bryant	OL	Alcorn State
Alvin Williams	DE	Chattanooga
Samuel Eskridge	OL	Eastern Kentucky
Marcus Mauney	DL	Elon
Jaden Kelly	LB	Kennesaw State
AJ Richardson	LB	NC State
Eric Etienne	DL	Western Kentucky
Keshawn Lynch	DE	Unknown
Jalen Daniels	QB	Unknown

==== Incoming ====
Player	Position	Previous school
Keyonte Arrington	OL	Alabama A&M
Stemarion Edwards	LB	Alcorn State
Jaden Kelly	LB	Arkansas–Pine Bluff
Khalib Gilmore	LB	Ball State
Major Dillard	DT	Chowan
Kahleef Jimmison	DB	Delaware State
Caleb Turner	S	Eastern Michigan
Kendric Nowling	LB	Eastern Michigan
Kahlil Bradford	DT	Florida Memorial
Tormon Laprade	DB	Florida Memorial
Kymari Gray	WR	Hampton
Abe Williams	WR	Hampton
Armand Vinson	DB	Hampton
Guan Price II	OL	Hampton
Tyler Leinberger	OL	Hampton
Earl Woods III	QB	Kennesaw State
BJ Blake	DB	Louisiana Tech
RJ Evans	DT	Mercer
David Ojiegbe	DE	Pittsburgh
Israel Carter	QB	South Florida
Elijah Simley-Flores	WR	Utah Tech
Nick Booker-Brown	DL	UTSA
Drake Hatcher	DT	Valdosta State
DreSean Kendrick	WR	William & Mary
Stephon Hall	S	Youngstown State

=== Coaching staff additions ===
Name	New Position	Previous Team	Previous Position	Source
Michael Vick	Head coach	Atlanta Legends	Offensive coordinator/Advisor	
Terence Garvin	Defensive coordinator	Florida Memorial	Co-defensive coordinator	
Elton Brown	Offensive line	The Apprentice School	Offensive coordinator	
Jabo Smith	Defensive backs	Florida Memorial	Co-defensive coordinator	
Izaan Cross	Defensive line	Georgia Knights Prep. Academy	Head coach	
LaRoy Reynolds	Linebackers	–	–	
Darryl Bullock	Assistant head coach	Hampton	Offensive line	
Andre Kendrick	Running backs	–	–	
Tory Woodbury	Special teams	Howard	Tight ends/Special teams	

== Schedule ==
Date	Time	Opponent	Site	TV	Result	Attendance
August 28	7:00 p.m.	Towson*	William "Dick" Price Stadium; Norfolk, VA	ESPNU	L 7–27	1,469
September 6	6:00 p.m.	Virginia State*	William "Dick" Price Stadium; Norfolk, VA	ESPN+	W 34–31 ^{OT}	22,396
September 13	3:30 p.m.	at Rutgers*	SHI Stadium; Piscataway, NJ	BTN	L 10–60	41,011
September 20	4:00 p.m.	Sacred Heart*	William "Dick" Price Stadium; Norfolk, VA	ESPN+	L 28–31	8,127
September 27	12:00 p.m.	at Wagner*	Wagner College Stadium; Staten Island, NY	NEC Front Row	L 13–18	3,135
October 4	4:00 p.m.	at Hampton*	Armstrong Stadium; Hampton, VA (Battle of the Bay)	FloSports	L 34–41	9,710
October 11	1:30 p.m.	at Wofford*	Gibbs Stadium; Spartanburg, SC	ESPN+	L 14–31	4,844
October 25	2:00 p.m.	South Carolina State^{†}	William "Dick" Price Stadium; Norfolk, VA	ESPN+	L 20–51	47,273
October 30	7:00 p.m.	vs. Delaware State	Lincoln Financial Field; Philadelphia, PA	ESPNU	L 20–27	47,266
November 8	2:00 p.m.	at North Carolina Central	O'Kelly–Riddick Stadium; Durham, NC	ESPN+	L 28–31	7,225
November 15	12:00 p.m.	Morgan State	William "Dick" Price Stadium; Norfolk, VA	ESPN+	L 28–35	7,294
November 22	3:30 p.m.	vs. Howard	Audi Field; Washington, D.C.	ESPN+	L 15–44	1,968
*Non-conference game; ^{†}Homecoming; All times are in Eastern time

== Game summaries ==
=== Towson ===
Towson Tigers (0-0) at Norfolk State Spartans (0-0) – Game summary

Quarter	1	2	3	4	Total
Tigers	10	3	0	14	27
Spartans	0	0	0	7	7

at William "Dick" Price Stadium • Norfolk, VA

- Date: August 28
- Game time: 7:00 p.m. EDT
- Game attendance: 1,469
- Referee: Jason Soistman
- TV announcers (ESPNU): Tiffany Greene (play-by-play) and Jay Walker (analyst)

Game information

First quarter

- TOW – Jaceon Doss 33-yard pass from Andrew Indorf (Caden Williams kick), 10:37. Tigers 7–0. Drive: 8 plays, 76 yards, 3:09.
- TOW – Caden Williams 24-yard field goal, 2:45. Tigers 10–0. Drive: 11 plays, 43 yards, 5:20.

Second quarter

- TOW – Caden Williams 50-yard field goal, 10:41. Tigers 13–0. Drive: 11 plays, 43 yards, 5:11.

Third quarter

No scoring plays.

Fourth quarter

- NORF – Jaylen Laudermilk 8-yard run (Evan Helfrich kick), 14:17. Tigers 13–7. Drive: 6 plays, 43 yards, 0:43.
- TOW – Zay Perkins 36-yard pass from Andrew Indorf (Caden Williams kick), 11:06. Tigers 20–7. Drive: 8 plays, 67 yards, 3:02.
- TOW – John Dunmore 15-yard pass from Andrew Indorf (Caden Williams kick), 3:15. Tigers 27–7. Drive: 6 plays, 33 yards, 3:06.

Statistics	TOW	NORF
First downs	18	16
Total yards	323	279
Rushing yards	136	39
Passing yards	187	240
Passing: Comp–Att–Int	14–26–0	21–31–0
Time of possession	31:05	27:35

Team	Category	Player	Statistics
Towson	Passing	Andrew Indorf	14/26, 187 yards, 3 TD
Towson	Rushing	Kemarrion Battles	16 carries, 79 yards
Towson	Receiving	John Dunmore	5 receptions, 61 yards, TD
Norfolk State	Passing	Otto Kuhns	19/27, 219 yards
Norfolk State	Rushing	Kevon King	11 carries, 30 yards
Norfolk State	Receiving	Dresean Kendrick	11 receptions, 125 yards

=== Virginia State (DII) ===
Virginia State Trojans (DII) (1–0) at Norfolk State Spartans (0–1) – Game summary

Quarter	1	2	3	4	OT	Total
Trojans (DII)	3	13	7	8	0	31
Spartans	7	0	3	21	3	34

at William "Dick" Price Stadium • Norfolk, VA

- Date: September 6
- Game time: 6:00 p.m. EDT
- Game weather: Sunny • Temperature: 89 °F (32 °C) • Wind: SW at 15 miles per hour (24 km/h)
- Game attendance: 23,899
- Referee: Toby Johnson
- TV announcers (ESPN+): Ross Gordon (play-by-play) and Matt Michalec (analyst)

Game information

First quarter

- (9:42) VIR – Joshua Campbell 22-yard field goal (Drive: 11 plays, 62 yards, 5:11; Virginia State 7–0)
- (5:43) NORF – Jason Wonodi 0-yard punt return, Evan Helfrich kick (Tied 7–7)

Second quarter

- (13:55) VIR – Ajenavi Byrd 41-yard pass from Rahsaan Matthews Jr., Joshua Campbell kick (Drive: 8 plays, 76 yards, 2:03; Virginia State 14–7)
- (11:20) VIR – Donovan Howard 57-yard fumble recovery (Virginia State 16–7)

Third quarter

- (10:15) NORF – Marco Peery 36-yard field goal (Drive: 9 plays, 51 yards, 4:39; Virginia State 16–10)
- (3:27) VIR – Rahsaan Matthews Jr. 14-yard pass from Malik Hunter, Joshua Campbell kick (Drive: 6 plays, 86 yards, 3:49; Virginia State 23–10)

Fourth quarter

- (14:57) NORF – J. J. Evans 6-yard pass from Otto Kuhns, Evan Helfrich kick (Drive: 9 plays, 70 yards, 3:24; Virginia State 23–17)
- (8:54) NORF – DreSean Kendrick 18-yard pass from Otto Kuhns, Evan Helfrich kick (Drive: 6 plays, 78 yards, 2:52; Norfolk State 24–23)
- (2:14) VIR – Marquis Smith 28-yard pass from Rahsaan Matthews Jr., Rahsaan Matthews Jr. rush (Drive: 5 plays, 66 yards, 2:50; Virginia State 31–24)
- (0:53) NORF – Jaylen Laudermilk 33-yard run, Evan Helfrich kick (Drive: 7 plays, 63 yards, 1:14; Tied 31–31)

Overtime

- NORF – Evan Helfrich 29-yard field goal (Drive: 5 plays, 14 yards, 0:00; Norfolk State 34–31)

Statistics	VIR	NORF
First downs	24	25
Total yards	440	490
Rushing yards	127	237
Passing yards	313	25
Passing: Comp–Att–Int	22–43–0	23–37–0
Time of possession	30:24	29:25

Team	Category	Player	Statistics
Virginia State	Passing	Rahsaan Matthews Jr.	21/42, 299 yards, 2 TD
Virginia State	Rushing	Brandon Rose	12 carries, 66 yards
Virginia State	Receiving	Marquis Smith	6 receptions, 105 yards, TD
Norfolk State	Passing	Otto Kuhns	13/20, 173 yards, 2 TD
Norfolk State	Rushing	Kevon King	9 carries, 63 yards
Norfolk State	Receiving	Kam'Ryn Thomas	5 receptions, 82 yards

=== at Rutgers (FBS) ===
Norfolk State Spartans (1-1) at Rutgers Scarlet Knights (FBS) (2-0) – Game summary

Quarter	1	2	3	4	Total
Spartans	0	3	7	0	10
Scarlet Knights (FBS)	13	13	20	14	60

at SHI Stadium • Piscataway, NJ

- Date: September 13
- Game time: 3:30 PM EDT
- Game weather: Sunny • Temperature: 81 °F (27 °C) • Wind: SW at 6 miles per hour (9.7 km/h)
- Game attendance: 41,011
- Referee: Francisco Villar
- TV announcers (BTN): Jason Horowitz (play-by-play), Matt Millen (analyst) and Anthony Fucilli (sideline)

Game information

First Quarter

- (14:09) RUTG – Dylan Braithwaite 6-yard punt return (Rutgers 6–0)
- (0:48) RUTG – Kaj Sanders 22-yard punt return, Jai Patel kick (Rutgers 13–0)

Second Quarter

- (12:24) NORF – Evan Helfrich 34-yard field goal (Drive: 9 plays, 59 yards, 3:24; Rutgers 13–3)
- (8:04) RUTG – Antwan Raymond 3-yard run, Jai Patel kick (Drive: 9 plays, 62 yards, 4:15; Rutgers 20–3)
- (3:50) RUTG – Jai Patel 31-yard field goal (Drive: 7 plays, 62 yards, 2:14; Rutgers 23–3)
- (0:03) RUTG – Jai Patel 44-yard field goal (Drive: 12 plays, 57 yards, 1:44; Rutgers 26–3)

Third Quarter

- (11:08) RUTG – Ben Black 37-yard pass from Athan Kaliakmanis (Drive: 9 plays, 80 yards, 3:45; Rutgers 32–3)
- (9:34) NORF – Kevon King 25-yard run, Evan Helfrich kick (Drive: 5 plays, 75 yards, 1:34; Rutgers 32–10)
- (7:29) RUTG – Antwan Raymond 1-yard run, Jai Patel kick (Drive: 5 plays, 75 yards, 2:05; Rutgers 39–10)
- (0:14) RUTG – Ja'shon Benjamin 11-yard run, Jai Patel kick (Drive: 8 plays, 85 yards, 4:04; Rutgers 46–10)

Fourth Quarter

- (7:40) RUTG – Dino Kaliakmanis 9-yard pass from AJ Surace, Dane Pizzaro kick (Drive: 10 plays, 48 yards, 6:20; Rutgers 53–10)
- (4:59) RUTG – Michael Thomas III 25-yard pass from AJ Surace, Dane Pizzaro kick (Drive: 6 plays, 34 yards, 2:18; Rutgers 60–10)

Statistics	NORF	RUTG
First downs	12	33
Plays–yards	50–220	81–563
Rushes–yards	27–128	46–185
Passing yards	92	378
Passing: comp–att–int	9–23–1	23–35–0
Turnovers	2	0
Time of possession	23:55	36:05

Team	Category	Player	Statistics
Norfolk State	Passing	Otto Kuhns	8/20, 90 yards, INT
Norfolk State	Rushing	Kevon King	7 carries, 56 yards, TD
Norfolk State	Receiving	DreSean Kendrick	3 receptions, 48 yards
Rutgers	Passing	Athan Kaliakmanis	18/26, 309 yards, TD
Rutgers	Rushing	Antwan Raymond	16 carries, 79 yards, 2 TD
Rutgers	Receiving	KJ Duff	6 receptions, 119 yards

=== Sacred Heart ===
Sacred Heart Pioneers (2-1) vs. Norfolk State Spartans (1-2) – Game summary

Quarter	1	2	3	4	Total
Pioneers	7	14	3	7	31
Spartans	7	7	0	14	28

at William "Dick" Price Stadium • Norfolk, VA

- Date: September 20
- Game time: 4:00 p.m. EDT
- Game weather: Sunny • Temperature: 80 °F (27 °C) • Wind: SW at 15 miles per hour (24 km/h)
- Game attendance: 8,127
- Referee: Javarro Edwards
- TV announcers (ESPN+): Ross Gordon (play-by-play), Don Carey (analyst) and Kendall Lanier (sideline)

Game information

First Quarter

- (10:55) SHU – Jack Snyder 18-yard run, Matt Kling kick (Drive: 9 plays, 70 yards, 4:00; Sacred Heart 7-0)
- (4:36) NORF – X'Zavion Evans 18-yard run, Evan Helfrich kick (Drive: 14 plays, 75 yards, 6:19; 7-7)

Second Quarter

- (14:55) NORF – X'Zavion Evans 7-yard run, Evan Helfrich kick (Drive: 8 plays, 73 yards, 3:06; Norfolk State 14-7)
- (2:42) SHU – Trey Eberhart III 28-yard run, Matt Kling kick (Drive: 8 plays, 71 yards, 3:05; 14-14)
- (0:48) SHU – Mitchell Summers 22-yard run, Matt Kling kick (Drive: 3 plays, 29 yards, 1:06; Sacred Heart 21-14)

Third Quarter

- (1:45) SHU – Matt Kling 19-yard field goal (Drive: 11 plays, 52 yards, 6:47; Sacred Heart 24-14)

Fourth Quarter

- (11:40) NORF – Kevon King 57-yard run, Evan Helfrich kick (Drive: 3 plays, 81 yards, 1:25; Sacred Heart 24-21)
- (5:32) SHU – Jack Snyder 7-yard run, Matt Kling kick (Drive: 6 plays, 49 yards, 2:41; Sacred Heart 31-21)
- (3:55) NORF – DreSean Kendrick 29-yard pass from Otto Kuhns, Evan Helfrich kick (Drive: 7 plays, 74 yards, 1:36; Sacred Heart 31-28)

Statistics	SHU	NORF
First downs	18	29
Total yards	390	550
Rushing yards	295	210
Passing yards	95	340
Passing: Comp–Att–Int	9–14–0	27–42–1
Time of possession	34:37	25:23

Team	Category	Player	Statistics
Sacred Heart	Passing	Jack Snyder	8/13, 92 yards
Sacred Heart	Rushing	Mitchell Summers	26 carries, 119 yards, TD
Sacred Heart	Receiving	Payton Rhoades	2 receptions, 46 yards
Norfolk State	Passing	Otto Kuhns	27/42, 340 yards, TD, INT
Norfolk State	Rushing	Kevon King	11 carries, 72 yards, TD
Norfolk State	Receiving	JJ Evans	7 receptions, 113 yards

=== at Wagner ===
Wagner Seahawks (0-4) vs. Norfolk State Spartans (1-3) – Game summary

Quarter	1	2	3	4	Total
Spartans	13	0	0	0	13
Seahawks	0	0	12	6	18

at Wagner College Stadium • Staten Island, NY

- Date: September 27
- Game time: 12 p.m. EDT
- Game weather: Sunny • Temperature: 80 °F (27 °C)
- Game attendance: 3,135
- Referee: Michael Quinn
- TV announcers (NEC Front Row): Marc Ernay (play-by-play) and Ray Martel (analyst)

Game information

First Quarter

- (13:04) NORF – X'Zavion Evans 14-yard run, Evan Helfrich PAT failed (Drive: 3 plays, 29 yards, 1:10; Norfolk State 6-0)
- (11:32) NORF – Kevon King 1-yard run, Marco Peery kick (Drive: 4 plays, 46 yards, 0:54; Norfolk State 13-0)

Second Quarter

No scoring plays

Third Quarter

- (5:37) WAG – Andre Hines Jr. 1-yard run, Nicholas Romero PAT failed (Drive: 8 plays, 41 yards, 3:29; Norfolk State 13-6)
- (2:41) WAG – Malik Redd 62-yard pass from Jordan Barton, Nicholas Romero PAT failed (Drive: 3 plays, 73 yards, 1:12; Norfolk State 13-12)

Fourth Quarter

- (11:30) WAG – Johans Bars 24-yard pass from Jordan Barton, Two-point pass conversion failed (Drive: 10 plays, 80 yards, 3:44; Wagner 18-12)

Statistics	NORF	WAG
First downs	19	22
Total yards	288	398
Rushing yards	140	215
Passing yards	148	183
Passing: Comp–Att–Int	22–37–2	14–22–2
Time of possession	29:48	30:12

Team	Category	Player	Statistics
Norfolk State	Passing	Otto Kuhns	17/28, 119 yards, INT
Norfolk State	Rushing	Kevon King	14 carries, 48 yards, TD
Norfolk State	Receiving	DreSean Kendrick	5 receptions, 33 yards
Wagner	Passing	Jordan Barton	14/22, 183 yards, 2 TD, 2 INT
Wagner	Rushing	Andre Hines Jr.	22 carries, 108 yards, TD
Wagner	Receiving	Malik Redd	3 receptions, 89 yards, TD

=== at Hampton (Battle of the Bay) ===
Norfolk State Spartans (1-4) vs. Hampton Pirates (1-4) – Game summary

Quarter	1	2	3	4	Total
Spartans	14	7	3	10	34
Pirates	10	17	7	7	41

at Armstrong Stadium • Hampton, VA

- Date: October 4
- Game time: 4:00 p.m. EDT
- Game weather: Sunny • Temperature: 72 °F (22 °C)
- Game attendance: 9,710
- Referee: Jeremy DeAngulo
- TV announcers (FloSports): Nathan Epstein (play-by-play), Terence Green (analyst) and Tamara Brown (sideline)

Game information

First Quarter

- (11:49) HAMP – Brett Starling 39-yard field goal (Drive: 8 plays, 28 yards, 3:06; Hampton 3–0)
- (10:46) NORF – DreSean Kendrick 65-yard pass from Otto Kuhns, Marco Peery kick (Drive: 3 plays, 75 yards, 1:03; Norfolk State 7–3)
- (5:15) NORF – Jaylen Laudermilk 9-yard pass from Otto Kuhns, Marco Peery kick (Drive: 5 plays, 49 yards, 3:08; Norfolk State 14–3)
- (1:57) HAMP – Donovan Shepard 7-yard pass from Braden Davis, Brett Starling kick (Drive: 9 plays, 75 yards, 3:18; Norfolk State 14–10)

Second Quarter

- (12:17) NORF – Xzavion Evans 1-yard run, Marco Peery kick (Drive: 7 plays, 65 yards, 4:33; Norfolk State 21–10)
- (9:33) HAMP – Gracen Goldsmith 30-yard run, Brett Starling kick (Drive: 6 plays, 73 yards, 2:37; Norfolk State 21–17)
- (5:08) HAMP – Brett Starling 25-yard field goal (Drive: 7 plays, 30 yards, 2:54; Norfolk State 21–20)
- (1:29) HAMP – MarShawn Ferguson Jr. 14-yard run, Brett Starling kick (Drive: 5 plays, 53 yards, 0:43; Hampton 27–21)

Third Quarter

- (11:16) NORF – Marco Peery 28-yard field goal (Drive: 6 plays, 65 yards, 3:39; Hampton 27–24)
- (6:57) HAMP – Jah'Kei Chavis 4-yard run, Brett Starling kick (Drive: 9 plays, 68 yards, 4:18; Hampton 34–24)

Fourth Quarter

- (10:23) NORF – Ikeem Wright 18-yard pass from Otto Kuhns, Marco Peery kick (Drive: 7 plays, 72 yards, 2:21; Hampton 34–31)
- (8:52) HAMP – Braden Davis 21-yard run, Brett Starling kick (Drive: 3 plays, 50 yards, 1:23; Hampton 41–31)
- (4:02) NORF – Marco Peery 29-yard field goal (Drive: 11 plays, 60 yards, 4:43; Hampton 41–34)

Statistics	NORF	HAMP
First downs	27	29
Total yards	415	438
Rushing yards	173	236
Passing yards	242	202
Passing: Comp–Att–Int	15–25–0	16–28–1
Time of possession	28:21	31:39

Team	Category	Player	Statistics
Norfolk State	Passing	Otto Kuhns	15/25, 242 yards, 3 TD
Norfolk State	Rushing	Xzavion Evans	21 carries, 93 yards, TD
Norfolk State	Receiving	DreSean Kendrick	2 receptions, 120 yards, TD
Hampton	Passing	Braden Davis	16/28, 202 yards, TD, INT
Hampton	Rushing	Gracen Goldsmith	11 carries, 75 yards, TD
Hampton	Receiving	Maxwell Moss	4 receptions, 73 yards

=== at Wofford ===
Norfolk State Spartans (1-5) vs. Wofford Terriers (0-5) – Game summary

Quarter	1	2	3	4	Total
Spartans	7	0	7	0	14
Terriers	7	7	7	10	31

at Gibbs Stadium • Spartanburg, SC

- Date: October 11
- Game time: 1:30 p.m. EDT
- Game weather: Cloudy • Temperature: 68 °F (20 °C) • Wind: NE at 10 miles per hour (16 km/h)
- Game attendance: 4,843
- Referee: Brian Hilpisch
- TV announcers (ESPN+): Jim Noble (play-by-play), Thom Henson (analyst) and Van Hipp (sideline)

Game information

First Quarter

- (9:15) NORF – Elyjah Mitchell 12-yard pass from Otto Kuhns, Marco Peery kick (Drive: 11 plays, 82 yards, 5:38; Norfolk State 7-0)
- (7:40) WOF – Isaiah Scott 22-yard pass from JT Fayard, Sam Spence kick (Drive: 3 plays, 65 yards, 1:28; 7-7)

Second Quarter

- (5:35) WOF – Ihson Jackson-Anderson 3-yard run, Sam Spence kick (Drive: 8 plays, 80 yards, 4:31; Wofford 14-7)

Third Quarter

- (11:48) NORF – Kam'Ryn Thomas 33-yard pass from Otto Kuhns, Marco Peery kick (Drive: 5 plays, 67 yards, 1:54; 14-14)
- (2:42) WOF – CJ Adams 23-yard pass from JT Fayard, Sam Spence kick (Drive: 6 plays, 76 yards, 2:39; Wofford 21-14)

Fourth Quarter

- (9:07) WOF – Sam Spence 46-yard field goal (Drive: 13 plays, 40 yards, 6:48; Wofford 24-14)
- (1:55) WOF – Gerald Modest 2-yard run, Sam Spence kick (Drive: 11 plays, 52 yards, 5:56; Wofford 31-14)

Statistics	NORF	WOF
First downs	12	23
Total yards	242	435
Rushing yards	73	187
Passing yards	169	248
Passing: Comp–Att–Int	16-29-1	23-34-1
Time of possession	23:09	36:51

Team	Category	Player	Statistics
Norfolk State	Passing	Otto Kuhns	16/29, 169 yards, 2 TD, INT
Norfolk State	Rushing	X'Zavion Evans	16 carries, 45 yards
Norfolk State	Receiving	Kam'Ryn Thomas	8 receptions, 112 yards, TD
Wofford	Passing	JT Fayard	23/34, 248 yards, 2 TD, INT
Wofford	Rushing	Ihson Jackson-Anderson	17 carries, 113 yards, TD
Wofford	Receiving	CJ Adams	2 receptions, 63 yards, TD

=== South Carolina State ===
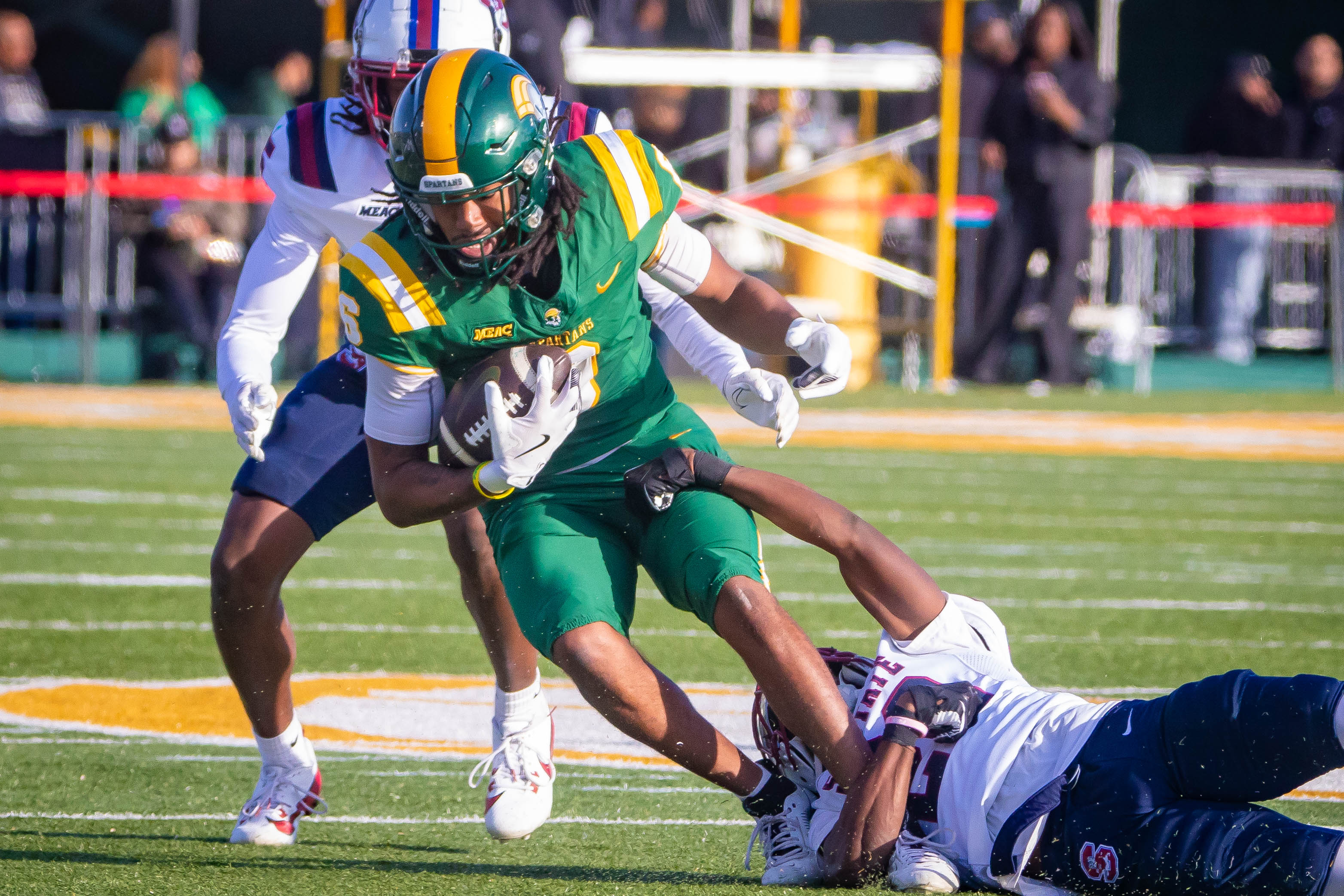
NSU vs SC State University in 2025

South Carolina State Bulldogs (4-3) at Norfolk State Spartans (1-6) – Game summary

Quarter	1	2	3	4	Total
Bulldogs	3	35	6	7	51
Spartans	7	7	0	6	20

at William "Dick" Price Stadium • Norfolk, VA

- Date: October 25
- Game time: 2:00 p.m. EDT
- Game weather: Sunny • Temperature: 60 °F (16 °C) • Wind: N at 7 miles per hour (11 km/h)
- Game attendance: 47,273
- Referee: Javarro Edwards
- TV announcers (ESPN+): Ross Gordon (play-by-play), Don Carey (analyst) and Kendall Lanier (sideline)

Game information

First Quarter

- (4:35) NORF – JJ Evans 22-yard pass from Otto Kuhns, Marco Peery kick (Drive: 5 plays, 44 yards, 2:12; Norfolk State 7-0)
- (1:12) SCST – Nico Cavanillas Alti 36-yard field goal (Drive: 7 plays, 34 yards, 3:16; Norfolk State 7-3)

Second Quarter

- (11:42) SCST – Mason Pickett-Hicks 3-yard run, Nico Cavanillas Alti kick (Drive: 8 plays, 73 yards, 3:06; South Carolina State 10-7)
- (8:08) SCST – Nigel Johnson 15-yard pass from William Atkins IV, Nico Cavanillas Alti kick (Drive: 4 plays, 52 yards, 2:00; South Carolina State 17-7)
- (4:54) SCST – Jordan Smith 75-yard pass from William Atkins IV, Nico Cavanillas Alti kick (Drive: 3 plays, 80 yards, 1:04; South Carolina State 24-7)
- (1:07) SCST – Jordan Smith 36-yard pass from William Atkins IV, Nico Cavanillas Alti kick (Drive: 5 plays, 53 yards, 1:59; South Carolina State 31-7)
- (0:41) NORF – X'Zavion Evans 66-yard pass from Otto Kuhns, Marco Peery kick (Drive: 2 plays, 81 yards, 0:21; South Carolina State 31-14)
- (0:07) SCST – Mason Pickett-Hicks 8-yard pass from William Atkins IV, Nico Cavanillas Alti kick (Drive: 5 plays, 63 yards, 0:34; South Carolina State 38-14)

Third Quarter

- (10:51) SCST – Nico Cavanillas Alti 26-yard field goal (Drive: 6 plays, 10 yards, 2:16; South Carolina State 41-14)
- (4:55) SCST – Nico Cavanillas Alti 31-yard field goal (Drive: 8 plays, 51 yards, 4:08; South Carolina State 44-14)

Fourth Quarter

- (13:35) SCST – Tyler Smith 1-yard run, Nico Cavanillas Alti kick (Drive: 7 plays, 68 yards, 2:23; South Carolina State 51-14)
- (12:44) NORF – JJ Evans 48-yard pass from Otto Kuhns, Evan Helfrich PAT failed (Drive: 4 plays, 75 yards, 0:51; South Carolina State 51-20)

Statistics	SCST	NORF
First downs	30	13
Total yards	613	291
Rushing yards	185	61
Passing yards	428	230
Passing: Comp–Att–Int	24-36-1	10-20-1
Time of possession	37:52	22:08

Team	Category	Player	Statistics
South Carolina State	Passing	William Atkins IV	24/36, 428 yards, 4 TD, INT
South Carolina State	Rushing	Tyler Smith	19 carries, 113 yards, TD
South Carolina State	Receiving	Jordan Smith	7 receptions, 197 yards, 2 TD
Norfolk State	Passing	Otto Kuhns	10/18, 230 yards, 3 TD, INT
Norfolk State	Rushing	X'Zavion Evans	11 carries, 48 yards
Norfolk State	Receiving	JJ Evans	4 receptions, 85 yards, 2 TD

=== vs. Delaware State ===
Norfolk State Spartans (1-7) vs. Delaware State Hornets (5-3) – Game summary

Quarter	1	2	3	4	Total
Spartans	0	6	0	14	20
Hornets	3	7	3	14	27

at Lincoln Financial Field • Philadelphia, PA

- Date: October 30
- Game time: 7:00 PM EDT
- Game weather: Cloudy • Temperature: 64 °F (18 °C) • Wind: SW at 5 miles per hour (8.0 km/h)
- Game attendance: 47,266
- Referee: Derek Hatten
- TV announcers (ESPNU): Tiffany Greene (play-by-play) and Jay Walker (analyst)

Game information

First Quarter

- (0:18) DSU – Patrick Fisher-Butler 30-yard field goal (Drive: 16 plays, 67 yards, 7:51; Delaware State 3-0)

Second Quarter

- (9:53) NORF – JJ Evans 13-yard pass from Otto Kuhns, Evan Helfrich PAT failed (Drive: 10 plays, 75 yards, 5:25; Norfolk State 6-3)
- (5:53) DSU – Amir Anderson blocked punt recovered in end zone, Thomas Monnig kick (Drive: 3 plays, -1 yard, 1:05; Delaware State 10-6)

Third Quarter

- (6:37) DSU – Patrick Fisher-Butler 26-yard field goal (Drive: 9 plays, 69 yards, 4:46; Delaware State 13-6)

Fourth Quarter

- (9:40) DSU – Tahmir Ellis 24-yard pass from Kaiden Bennett, Patrick Fisher-Butler PAT failed (Drive: 17 plays, 97 yards, 9:37; Delaware State 19-6)
- (7:20) NORF – JJ Evans 70-yard pass from Otto Kuhns, Marco Peery kick (Drive: 5 plays, 90 yards, 2:10; Delaware State 19-13)
- (6:38) DSU – James Jones 76-yard run, Kaiden Bennett pass to NyGhee Lolley for two-point conversion (Drive: 2 plays, 13 yards, 5:36; Delaware State 27-13)
- (0:54) NORF – DreSean Kendrick 11-yard pass from Otto Kuhns, Marco Peery kick (Drive: 7 plays, 45 yards, 1:48; Delaware State 27-20)

Statistics	NORF	DSU
First downs	22	21
Total yards	356	364
Rushing yards	45	201
Passing yards	311	163
Passing: Comp–Att–Int	22-34-1	17-22-0
Time of possession	27:32	32:28

Team	Category	Player	Statistics
Norfolk State	Passing	Otto Kuhns	22/34, 311 yards, 3 TD, INT
Norfolk State	Rushing	Kevon King	5 carries, 30 yards
Norfolk State	Receiving	JJ Evans	5 receptions, 124 yards, 2 TD
Delaware State	Passing	Kaiden Bennett	16/18, 158 yards, TD
Delaware State	Rushing	James Jones	10 carries, 109 yards, TD
Delaware State	Receiving	Nathan Stewart	4 receptions, 46 yards

=== at North Carolina Central ===
Norfolk State Spartans (1-8) vs. North Carolina Central Eagles (6-3) – Game summary

Quarter	1	2	3	4	Total
Spartans	7	0	7	14	28
Eagles	10	7	3	11	31

at O'Kelly–Riddick Stadium • Durham, NC

- Date: November 8
- Game time: 2:00 pm edt
- Game weather: Sunny • Temperature: 73 °F (23 °C) • Wind: S at 3 miles per hour (4.8 km/h)
- Game attendance: 7,225
- Referee: Jason Soistman

Game information

First Quarter

- (7:20) NCCU – Kaleb Robinson 32-yard field goal (Drive: 7 plays, 34 yards, 2:40; North Carolina Central 3-0)
- (5:14) NORF – X'Zavion Evans 7-yard run, Marco Peery kick (Drive: 8 plays, 83 yards, 4:16; Norfolk State 7-3)
- (0:58) NCCU – Mekhi Wall 33-yard pass from Walker Harris, Kaleb Robinson kick (Drive: 2 plays, 54 yards, 0:44; North Carolina Central 10-7)

Second Quarter

- (6:36) NCCU – Chauncey Spikes 5-yard pass from Walker Harris, Kaleb Robinson kick (Drive: 7 plays, 41 yards, 3:16; North Carolina Central 17-7)

Third Quarter

- (9:15) NCCU – Kaleb Robinson 26-yard field goal (Drive: 13 plays, 56 yards, 5:42; North Carolina Central 20-7)
- (5:12) NORF – Kam'Ryn Thomas 17-yard pass from Otto Kuhns, Marco Peery kick (Drive: 8 plays, 85 yards, 3:58; North Carolina Central 20-14)

Fourth Quarter

- (12:51) NCCU – Chauncey Spikes 3-yard pass from Walker Harris, Wade Harris pass to Nasim Cosby for two-point conversion (Drive: 4 plays, 13 yards, 2:09; North Carolina Central 28-14)
- (11:52) NORF – Kam'Ryn Thomas 18-yard pass from Vinson Berry, Marco Peery kick (Drive: 3 plays, 75 yards, 0:59; North Carolina Central 28-21)
- (6:52) NCCU – Kaleb Robinson 48-yard field goal (Drive: 9 plays, 44 yards, 5:00; North Carolina Central 31-21)
- (2:29) NORF – DreSean Kendrick 15-yard pass from Vinson Berry, Marco Peery kick (Drive: 4 plays, 71 yards, 1:04; North Carolina Central 31-28)

Statistics	NORF	NCCU
First downs	21	24
Total yards	403	350
Rushing yards	164	80
Passing yards	239	270
Passing: Comp–Att–Int	22-35-1	25-40-1
Time of possession	26:54	33:06

Team	Category	Player	Statistics
Norfolk State	Passing	Otto Kuhns	18/26, 197 yards, TD, INT
Norfolk State	Rushing	Kevon King	8 carries, 149 yards
Norfolk State	Receiving	Kam'Ryn Thomas	6 receptions, 96 yards, 2 TD
North Carolina Central	Passing	Walker Harris	24/39, 265 yards, 3 TD, INT
North Carolina Central	Rushing	Arthur Rodgers Jr.	24 carries, 80 yards
North Carolina Central	Receiving	Chauncey Spikes	8 receptions, 71 yards, 2 TD

=== Morgan State ===
Morgan State Bears (3-7) vs. Norfolk State Spartans (1-9) – Game summary

Quarter	1	2	3	4	Total
Bears	14	7	0	14	35
Spartans	14	6	8	0	28

at William "Dick" Price Stadium • Norfolk, VA

- Date: November 15
- Game time: 12:00 p.m. EDT
- Game weather: Cloudy • Temperature: 64 °F (18 °C) • Wind: SW at 10 miles per hour (16 km/h)
- Game attendance: 7,294
- Referee: Derek Hatten
- TV: ESPN+

Game information

First Quarter

- (10:29) MORG – Randall Nauden 1-yard run, Alex Amaya kick (Drive: 1 play, 1 yard, 0:03; Morgan State 7-0)
- (6:33) NORF – Kevon King 79-yard run, Marco Peery kick (Drive: 3 plays, 89 yards, 1:23; 7-7)
- (2:32) NORF – Kam'Ryn Thomas 18-yard pass from Vinson Berry, Marco Peery kick (Drive: 6 plays, 51 yards, 2:28; Norfolk State 14-7)
- (0:31) MORG – Joshua Smith 8-yard pass from Raymond Moore III, Alex Amaya kick (Drive: 5 plays, 19 yards, 1:49; 14-14)

Second Quarter

- (6:58) NORF – JJ Evans 17-yard pass from Vinson Berry, Marco Peery PAT failed (Drive: 10 plays, 67 yards, 4:09; Norfolk State 20-14)
- (0:02) MORG – Erick Hunter 90-yard return of blocked field goal, Alex Amaya kick (Drive: 5 plays, 56 yards, 0:29; Morgan State 21-20)

Third Quarter

- (0:17) NORF – DreSean Kendrick 10-yard run, Vinson Berry pass to DreSean Kendrick for two-point conversion (Drive: 11 plays, 80 yards, 5:41; Norfolk State 28-21)

Fourth Quarter

- (10:15) MORG – Justin Perry 13-yard pass from Raymond Moore III, Sahr Gbundema kick (Drive: 9 plays, 65 yards, 5:03; 28-28)
- (6:07) MORG – Raymond Moore III 0-yard run, Sahr Gbundema kick (Drive: 3 plays, 13 yards, 1:38; Morgan State 35-28)

Statistics	MORG	NORF
First downs	21	23
Total yards	345	460
Rushing yards	162	286
Passing yards	183	174
Passing: Comp–Att–Int	16–22–1	17–31–2
Time of possession	32:15	27:45

Team	Category	Player	Statistics
Morgan State	Passing	Raymond Moore III	16/22, 183 yards, 2 TD, INT
Morgan State	Rushing	Randall Nauden	22 carries, 87 yards, TD
Morgan State	Receiving	Malique Leatherbury	6 receptions, 60 yards
Norfolk State	Passing	Vinson Berry	17/31, 174 yards, 2 TD, 2 INT
Norfolk State	Rushing	Kevon King	14 carries, 189 yards, TD
Norfolk State	Receiving	JJ Evans	7 receptions, 98 yards, TD

=== vs. Howard ===
Norfolk State Spartans (0-0) vs. Howard Bison (0-0) – Game summary

Quarter	1	2	3	4	Total
Spartans	7	2	6	0	15
Bison	0	23	14	7	44

at Audi Field • Washington, DC

- Date: November 22
- Game time: 3:30 p.m. EDT
- Game weather: Cloudy • Temperature: 58 °F (14 °C)
- Game attendance: 1,968
- TV announcers (ESPN+): Trevin A. Jones (play by play) and Nate Henry (analyst)

Game information

First Quarter

- (10:32) NORF – X'Zavion Evans 11-yard run, Evan Helfrich kick (Drive: 8 plays, 78 yards, 4:22; Norfolk State 7-0)

Second Quarter

- (13:26) HOW – Travis Kerney 4-yard run, Matt Conord PAT failed (Drive: 8 plays, 74 yards, 4:08; Norfolk State 7-6)
- (13:26) NORF – Daylan Long defensive PAT conversion (Drive: 8 plays, 74 yards, 4:08; Norfolk State 9-6)
- (6:32) HOW – Anthony Reagan 4-yard run, Matt Conord kick (Drive: 11 plays, 82 yards, 5:18; Howard 13-9)
- (4:16) HOW – Anthony Reagan 7-yard pass from Tyriq Starks, Matt Conord kick (Drive: 6 plays, 12 yards, 3:58; Howard 20-9)
- (0:19) HOW – Matt Conord 27-yard field goal (Drive: 5 plays, 30 yards, 1:03; Howard 23-9)

Third Quarter

- (15:00) HOW – Montrell Walker 4-yard pass from Tyriq Starks, Matt Conord kick (Drive: 11 plays, 51 yards, 6:12; Howard 30-9)
- (6:55) HOW – Anthony Reagan 56-yard run, Matt Conord kick (Drive: 1 play, 56 yards, 0:09; Howard 37-9)
- (3:59) NORF – Kam'Ryn Thomas 34-yard pass from Parker Lancaster, two-point run conversion failed (Drive: 2 plays, 45 yards, 0:35; Howard 37-15)

Fourth Quarter

- (9:19) HOW – Andre Cooper II 11-yard pass from Tyriq Starks, Matt Conord kick (Drive: 8 plays, 60 yards, 5:10; Howard 44-15)

Statistics	NORF	HOW
First downs	17	23
Total yards	323	434
Rushing yards	141	155
Passing yards	182	279
Passing: Comp–Att–Int	10-20-0	24-35-2
Time of possession	25:13	34:47

Team	Category	Player	Statistics
Norfolk State	Passing	Vinson Berry	7/13, 94 yards
Norfolk State	Rushing	Kevon King	12 carries, 96 yards
Norfolk State	Receiving	Kam'Ryn Thomas	3 receptions, 90 yards, TD
Howard	Passing	Tyriq Starks	24/34, 279 yards, 3 TD, INT
Howard	Rushing	Anthony Reagan Jr.	16 carries, 113 yards, 2 TD
Howard	Receiving	Montrell Walker	6 receptions, 103 yards, TD
