= Kaj Mosque =

Former mosque in Isfahan, Iran

- مسجد جامع کاج
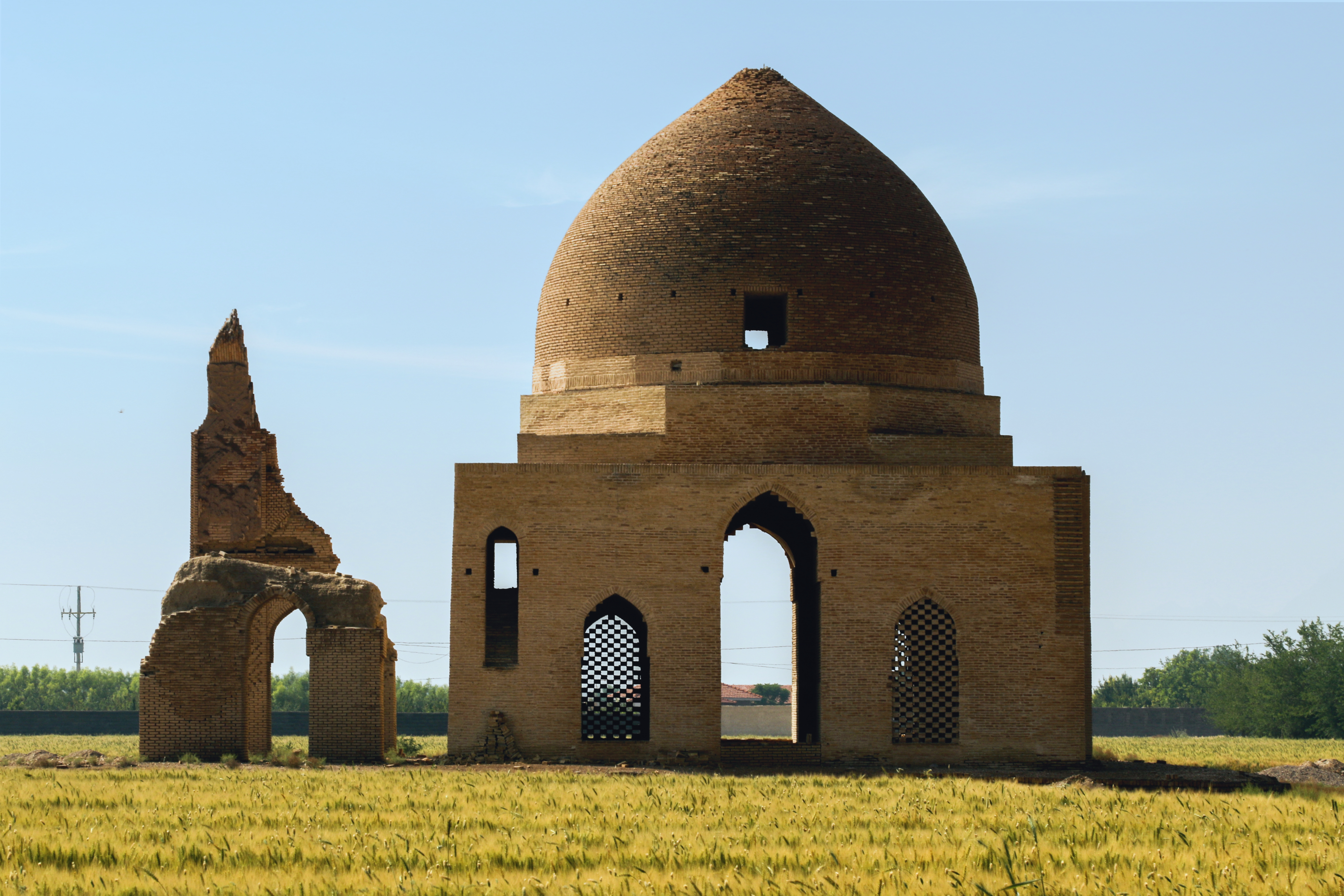
- Partial ruins of the former mosque

- Location of the former mosque in Iran

Religion
- Affiliation: Islam (former)
- Ecclesiastical or organisational status: Friday mosque (former)
- Status: Inactive (partial ruinous state)

Location
- Location: Kaj, Isfahan County, Isfahan Province
- Country: Iran
- Coordinates: 32°31′19″N 51°50′25″E

Architecture
- Type: Mosque architecture
- Style: Azari / Ilkhanid
- Completed: 1325 CE

Specifications
- Dome: One
- Minaret: One (since destroyed)
- Materials: Bricks; plaster; tiles

Iran National Heritage List
- Official name: Friday Mosque of Kaj
- Type: Friday Mosque
- Designated: 1940
- Reference no.: 328
- Conservation organization: Cultural Heritage, Handicrafts and Tourism Organization of Iran

The Kaj Mosque (Persian: مسجد جامع کاج), also known as the Jameh Mosque of Kaj, is a former Friday mosque in a partial ruinous state, located in the village of Kaj, in Isfahan County, in the province of Isfahan, Iran, Kaj is located approximately 24 kilometres (15 mi) east of Esfahan, on the northern bank of Zayandeh Rud.

The mosque was completed in 1325 CE, during the Ilkhanid era. Only some half-ruined walls and a dome remains from the mosque's original structure.. The remnants of the former mosque were added to the Iran National Heritage List on 10 February 1940, administered by the Cultural Heritage, Handicrafts and Tourism Organization of Iran.

Brick was used for the external structure and the interior decorations. The mosque had probably a minaret, but it has subsequently been destroyed.

== See also ==
- Islam in Iran
- List of mosques in Iran
