= 2025 Rutgers Scarlet Knights football team =

American college football season

2025 Rutgers Scarlet Knights football
- Conference: Big Ten Conference
- Record: 5–7 (2–7 Big Ten)
- Head coach: Greg Schiano (17th season)
- Offensive coordinator: Kirk Ciarrocca (5th season)
- Offensive scheme: Spread
- Co-defensive coordinators: Robb Smith (4th season); Zach Sparber (1st season)
- Base defense: 4–2–5
- Home stadium: SHI Stadium

Uniform

2025 Big Ten Conference football standings
	Conf.			Overall
Team	W		L	W		L
No. 1 Indiana y$#^	9	–	0	16	–	0
No. 5 Ohio State y^	9	–	0	12	–	2
No. 4 Oregon ^	8	–	1	13	–	2
No. 21 Michigan	7	–	2	9	–	4
No. 20 USC	7	–	2	9	–	4
No. 17 Iowa	6	–	3	9	–	4
Illinois	5	–	4	9	–	4
Washington	5	–	4	9	–	4
Minnesota	5	–	4	8	–	5
Nebraska	4	–	5	7	–	6
Northwestern	4	–	5	7	–	6
Penn State	3	–	6	7	–	6
UCLA	3	–	6	3	–	9
Rutgers	2	–	7	5	–	7
Wisconsin	2	–	7	4	–	8
Maryland	1	–	8	4	–	8
Michigan State	1	–	8	4	–	8
Purdue	0	–	9	2	–	10
Championship: Indiana 13, Ohio State 10
# – College Football Playoff champion; ^ – College Football Playoff participant; $ – Conference champion; y – Championship game participant; As of November 5, 2026; Rankings from AP Poll

The 2025 Rutgers Scarlet Knights football team represented Rutgers University as a member of the Big Ten Conference during the 2025 NCAA Division I FBS football season. The Scarlet Knights were led by 17th-year head coach Greg Schiano and played home games at SHI Stadium located in Piscataway, New Jersey. Despite going 5-7, Rutgers received an invitation to play against Georgia Southern in the Birmingham Bowl, but declined.

== Schedule ==
Date	Time	Opponent	Site	TV	Result	Attendance
August 28	6:00 p.m.	Ohio*	SHI Stadium; Piscataway, NJ	BTN	W 34–31	46,907
September 6	3:30 p.m.	Miami (OH)*	SHI Stadium; Piscataway, NJ	Peacock	W 45–17	45,981
September 13	3:30 p.m.	Norfolk State*	SHI Stadium; Piscataway, NJ	BTN	W 60–10	41,011
September 19	8:00 p.m.	Iowa	SHI Stadium; Piscataway, NJ	FOX	L 28–38	55,942
September 27	12:00 p.m.	at Minnesota	Huntington Bank Stadium; Minneapolis, MN	BTN	L 28–31	46,234
October 10	9:00 p.m.	at Washington	Husky Stadium; Seattle, WA	FS1	L 19–38	63,743
October 18	6:30 p.m.	No. 8 Oregon^{†}	SHI Stadium; Piscataway, NJ	BTN	L 10–56	53,127
October 25	12:00 p.m.	at Purdue	Ross–Ade Stadium; West Lafayette, IN	BTN	W 27–24	55,289
November 1	12:00 p.m.	at Illinois	Gies Memorial Stadium; Champaign, IL	NBC	L 13–35	60,670
November 8	2:30 p.m.	Maryland	SHI Stadium; Piscataway, NJ (rivalry)	FS1	W 35–20	41,032
November 22	12:00 p.m.	at No. 1 Ohio State	Ohio Stadium; Columbus, OH	FOX	L 9–42	100,023
November 29	3:30 p.m.	Penn State	SHI Stadium; Piscataway, NJ	BTN	L 36–40	55,212
*Non-conference game; ^{†}Homecoming; Rankings from AP Poll (and CFP Rankings, after November 4) - Released prior to game; All times are in Eastern time; Source:

== Game summaries ==
=== vs Ohio ===
Ohio Bobcats (0–0) at Rutgers Scarlet Knights (0–0) – Game summary

Quarter	1	2	3	4	Total
Bobcats	7	10	14	0	31
Scarlet Knights	7	24	0	3	34

at SHI Stadium • Piscataway, New Jersey

- Date: August 28
- Game time: 6:00 p.m.
- Game weather: Sunny, 77°F (25°C)
- Game attendance: 46,907
- Referee: Mark Kluczynski
- TV announcers (BTN): Jason Horowitz (play-by-play), Brock Vereen (analyst), and Caroline Hendershot (sideline)

Game information

First quarter

- (9:52) RUTG - Antwan Raymond 14-yd run (Jai Patel kick) (Drive: 12 plays, 75 yards, 5:08; Rutgers 7-0)
- (4:58) OHIO - Mason Williams 4-yd pass from Parker Navarro (David Dellenbach kick) (Drive: 10 plays, 65 yards, 4:54; TIED 7-7)

Second quarter

- (14:52) RUTG - Jai Patel 23-yd field goal (Drive: 10 plays, 53 yards, 5:01; Rutgers 10-7)
- (13:52) RUTG - DT Sheffield 54-yd pass from Athan Kaliakmanis (Jai Patel kick) (Drive: 1 play, 54 yards, 0:07; Rutgers 17-7)
- (8:34) OHIO - Jake Bruno 14-yd pass from Parker Navarro (David Dellenbach kick) (Drive: 10 plays, 75 yards, 5:18; Rutgers 17-14)
- (5:20) RUTG - KJ Duff 6-yd pass from Athan Kaliakmanis (Jai Patel kick) (Drive: 6 plays, 75 yards, 3:14; Rutgers 24-14)
- (3:22) RUTG - Cam Miller 0-yd punt return (Jai Patel kick) (Drive: 4 plays, 87 yards, 1:55; Rutgers 31-14)
- (0:08) OHIO - David Dellenbach 30-yd field goal (Drive: 13 plays, 82 yards, 3:14; Rutgers 31-17)

Third quarter

- (11:10) OHIO - Parker Navarro 17-yd run (David Dellenbach kick) (Drive: 9 plays, 75 yards, 3:50; Rutgers 31-24)
- (4:07) OHIO - Jake Bruno 13-yd pass from Parker Navarro (David Dellenbach kick) (Drive: 7 plays, 90 yards, 3:38; TIED 31-31)

Fourth quarter

- (11:11) RUTG - Jai Patel 26-yd field goal (Drive: 14 plays, 67 yards, 7:56; Rutgers 34-31)

Statistics	OHIO	RUTG
First downs	24	24
Plays–yards	62-440	59-399
Rushes–yards	31-201	36-147
Passing yards	239	252
Passing: comp–att–int	21-31-0	18-23-0
Turnovers	0	0
Time of possession	28:15	31:45

Team	Category	Player	Statistics
Ohio	Passing	Parker Navarro	21/31, 239 yards, 3 TD
Ohio	Rushing	Parker Navarro	9 carries, 93 yards, TD
Ohio	Receiving	Chase Hendricks	9 receptions, 115 yards
Rutgers	Passing	Athan Kaliakmanis	18/23, 252 yards, 2 TD
Rutgers	Rushing	Antwan Raymond	14 carries, 88 yards, TD
Rutgers	Receiving	Ian Strong	7 receptions, 100 yards

=== vs Miami (OH) ===
Miami RedHawks (0–1) at Rutgers Scarlet Knights (1–0) – Game summary

Quarter	1	2	3	4	Total
RedHawks	7	3	7	0	17
Scarlet Knights	7	17	7	14	45

at SHI Stadium • Piscataway, New Jersey

- Date: September 6
- Game time: 3:30 p.m.
- Game attendance: 45,981
- Referee: Billy Williams
- TV announcers (Peacock): Paul Burmeister (play-by-play), Phil Simms (analyst) and Zora Stephenson (sideline)

Game information

First quarter

- RUTG – Ian Strong 14-yard pass from Athan Kaliakmanis (Jai Patel kick), 7:25. Scarlet Knights 7–0. Drive: 11 plays, 75 yards, 6:09.
- MOH – D'Shawntae Jones 1-yard run (Dom Dzioban kick), 5:11. Tied 7–7. Drive: 4 plays, 75 yards, 2:14.

Second quarter

- RUTG – Jai Patel 39-yard field goal, 12:34. Scarlet Knights 10–7. Drive: 16 plays, 54 yards, 7:37.
- RUTG – Antwan Raymond 2-yard run (Jai Patel kick), 8:18. Scarlet Knights 17–7. Drive: 3 plays, 12 yards, 0:59.
- RUTG – KJ Duff 11-yard pass from Athan Kaliakmanis (Jai Patel kick), 1:20. Scarlet Knights 24–7. Drive: 10 plays, 70 yards, 4:25.
- MOH – Dom Dzioban 40-yard field goal, 0:02. Scarlet Knights 24–10. Drive: 8 plays, 53 yards, 1:18.

Third quarter

- MOH – Dequan Finn 5-yard run (Dom Dzioban kick), 10:21. Scarlet Knights 24–17. Drive: 3 plays, 84 yards, 1:36.
- RUTG – Ian Strong 17-yard pass from Athan Kaliakmanis (Jai Patel kick), 6:08. Scarlet Knights 31–17. Drive: 9 plays, 65 yards, 4:06.

Fourth quarter

- RUTG – DT Sheffield 5-yard pass from Athan Kaliakmanis (Jai Patel kick), 5:42. Scarlet Knights 38–17. Drive: 10 plays, 78 yards, 6:29.
- RUTG – Antwan Raymond 4-yard run (Jai Patel kick), 1:53. Scarlet Knights 45–17. Drive: 4 plays, 48 yards, 1:49.

Statistics	M-OH	RUTG
First downs	14	31
Plays–yards	45–368	77–421
Rushes–yards	22–117	41–162
Passing yards	251	259
Passing: comp–att–int	14–23–1	26–36–0
Turnovers	1	0
Time of possession	20:54	39:06

Team	Category	Player	Statistics
Miami (OH)	Passing	Dequan Finn	14/23, 251 yards, INT
Miami (OH)	Rushing	Dequan Finn	11 carries, 85 yards, TD
Miami (OH)	Receiving	Keith Reynolds	7 receptions, 120 yards
Rutgers	Passing	Athan Kaliakmanis	26/36, 259 yards, 4 TD
Rutgers	Rushing	Antwan Raymond	13 carries, 82 yards, 2 TD
Rutgers	Receiving	Ian Strong	9 receptions, 116 yards, 2 TD

=== vs Norfolk State (FCS) ===
Norfolk State Spartans (FCS) (1–1) at Rutgers Scarlet Knights (2–0) – Game summary

Quarter	1	2	3	4	Total
Spartans (FCS)	0	3	7	0	10
Scarlet Knights	13	13	20	14	60

at SHI Stadium • Piscataway, New Jersey

- Date: September 13
- Game time: 3:30 p.m.
- Game weather: Sunny • Temperature: 81 °F (27 °C) • Wind: SW at 6 miles per hour (9.7 km/h)
- Game attendance: 41,011
- Referee: Francisco Villar
- TV announcers (BTN): Jason Horowitz (play-by-play), Matt Millen (analyst) and Anthony Fucilli (sideline)

Game information

First quarter

- (14:09) RUTG – Dylan Braithwaite 6-yard punt return (Rutgers 6–0)
- (0:48) RUTG – Kaj Sanders 22-yard punt return, Jai Patel kick (Rutgers 13–0)

Second quarter

- (12:24) NORF – Evan Helfrich 34-yard field goal (Drive: 9 plays, 59 yards, 3:24; Rutgers 13–3)
- (8:04) RUTG – Antwan Raymond 3-yard run, Jai Patel kick (Drive: 9 plays, 62 yards, 4:15; Rutgers 20–3)
- (3:50) RUTG – Jai Patel 31-yard field goal (Drive: 7 plays, 62 yards, 2:14; Rutgers 23–3)
- (0:03) RUTG – Jai Patel 44-yard field goal (Drive: 12 plays, 57 yards, 1:44; Rutgers 26–3)

Third quarter

- (11:08) RUTG – Ben Black 37-yard pass from Athan Kaliakmanis (Drive: 9 plays, 80 yards, 3:45; Rutgers 32–3)
- (9:34) NORF – Kevon King 25-yard run, Evan Helfrich kick (Drive: 5 plays, 75 yards, 1:34; Rutgers 32–10)
- (7:29) RUTG – Antwan Raymond 1-yard run, Jai Patel kick (Drive: 5 plays, 75 yards, 2:05; Rutgers 39–10)
- (0:14) RUTG – Ja'shon Benjamin 11-yard run, Jai Patel kick (Drive: 8 plays, 85 yards, 4:04; Rutgers 46–10)

Fourth quarter

- (7:40) RUTG – Dino Kaliakmanis 9-yard pass from AJ Surace, Dane Pizzaro kick (Drive: 10 plays, 48 yards, 6:20; Rutgers 53–10)
- (4:59) RUTG – Michael Thomas III 25-yard pass from AJ Surace, Dane Pizzaro kick (Drive: 6 plays, 34 yards, 2:18; Rutgers 60–10)

Statistics	NORF	RUTG
First downs	12	33
Plays–yards	50–220	81–563
Rushes–yards	27–128	46–185
Passing yards	92	378
Passing: comp–att–int	9–23–1	23–35–0
Turnovers	2	0
Time of possession	23:55	36:05

Team	Category	Player	Statistics
Norfolk State	Passing	Otto Kuhns	8/20, 90 yards, INT
Norfolk State	Rushing	Kevon King	7 carries, 56 yards, TD
Norfolk State	Receiving	DreSean Kendrick	3 receptions, 48 yards
Rutgers	Passing	Athan Kaliakmanis	18/26, 309 yards, TD
Rutgers	Rushing	Antwan Raymond	16 carries, 79 yards, 2 TD
Rutgers	Receiving	KJ Duff	6 receptions, 119 yards

=== vs Iowa ===
Iowa Hawkeyes (2–1) at Rutgers Scarlet Knights (3–0) – Game summary

Quarter	1	2	3	4	Total
Hawkeyes	14	7	0	17	38
Scarlet Knights	14	7	0	7	28

at SHI Stadium • Piscataway, New Jersey

- Date: September 19
- Game time: 8:00 p.m.
- Game weather: Clear • Temperature: 76 °F (24 °C) • Wind: N at 5 miles per hour (8.0 km/h)
- Game attendance: 55,942
- Referee: Jason Nickleby
- TV announcers (FOX): Connor Onion (play-by-play), Mark Helfrich (analyst), and Jen Hale (sideline)

Game information

First quarter

- IOWA - Kaden Wetjen 100-yard kickoff return (Drew Stevens kick), 14:48. Hawkeyes 7–0.
- RUTG - Antwan Raymond 5-yard run (Jai Patel kick), 12:39. Tied 7–7. Drive: 6 plays, 75 yards, 2:09.
- RUTG - Athan Kaliakmanis 4-yard run (Jai Patel kick), 6:03. Rutgers 14–7. Drive: 12 plays, 63 yards, 5:31.
- IOWA - Kamari Moulton 6-yard run (Drew Stevens kick), 2:24. Tied 14–14. Drive: 6 plays, 75 yards, 3:39.

Second quarter

- RUTG - Athan Kaliakmanis 1-yard run (Jai Patel kick), 12:07. Rutgers 21–14. Drive: 9 plays, 75 yards, 5:17.
- RUTG - Mark Gronowski 2-yard run (Drew Stevens kick), 8:00. Tied 21–21. Drive: 7 plays, 73 yards, 4:08.

Third quarter

- No scoring plays.

Fourth quarter

- IOWA - Drew Stevens 26-yard field goal, 14:02. Hawkeyes 24–21. Drive: 10 plays, 69 yards, 4:44.
- RUTG - Antwan Raymond 1-yard run (Jai Patel kick), 9:44. Rutgers 28–24. Drive: 9 plays, 75 yards, 4:18.
- IOWA - Mark Gronowski 2-yard run (Drew Stevens kick), 5:39. Hawkeyes 31–28. Drive: 7 plays, 80 yards, 3:55.
- IOWA - Mark Gronowski 1-yard run (Drew Stevens kick), 2:14. Hawkeyes 38–28. Drive: 6 plays, 35 yards, 2:04.

Statistics	IOWA	RUTG
First downs	22	20
Plays–yards	56–346	70–400
Rushes–yards	38–160	30–70
Passing yards	186	330
Passing: comp–att–int	12–18–0	24–40–1
Turnovers	0	1
Time of possession	28:54	31:06

Team	Category	Player	Statistics
Iowa	Passing	Mark Gronowski	12/18, 186 yards
Iowa	Rushing	Kamari Moulton	14 carries, 68 yards, TD
Iowa	Receiving	Dayton Howard	1 reception, 42 yards
Rutgers	Passing	Athan Kaliakmanis	24/40, 330 yards, INT
Rutgers	Rushing	Antwan Raymond	18 carries, 62 yards, 2 TD
Rutgers	Receiving	Ian Strong	8 receptions, 151 yards

=== at Minnesota ===
Rutgers Scarlet Knights (3–1) at Minnesota Golden Gophers (2–1) – Game summary

Quarter	1	2	3	4	Total
Scarlet Knights	7	14	0	7	28
Golden Gophers	0	14	10	7	31

at Huntington Bank Stadium • Minneapolis, Minnesota

- Date: September 27
- Game time: 12:00 p.m.
- Game weather: Sunny • Temperature: 66 °F (19 °C) • Wind: N 11 mph
- Game attendance: 46,234
- Referee: Jeff Servinski
- TV announcers (BTN): Guy Haberman (play-by-play), Yogi Roth (analyst), and Rhett Lewis (sideline)

Game information

First quarter

- (3:16) RUTG – DT Sheffield 4-yard pass from Athan Kaliakmanis, Jai Patel kick (Drive: 8 plays, 62 yards, 4:14; Rutgers 7–0)

Second quarter

- (10:43) RUTG – KJ Duff 14-yard pass from Athan Kaliakmanis, Jai Patel kick (Drive: 12 plays, 68 yards, 4:41; Rutgers 14–0)
- (8:52) MINN – Fame Ijeboi 2-yard run, Brady Denaburg kick (Drive: 3 plays, 81 yards, 1:44; Rutgers 14–7)
- (7:58) MINN – Lemeke Brockington 8-yard pass from Drake Lindsey, Brady Denaburg kick (Drive: 1 play, 8 yards, 0:07; Tied 14–14)
- (0:18) RUTG – Athan Kaliakmanis 2-yard run, Jai Patel kick (Drive: 7 plays, 63 yards, 0:48; Rutgers 21–14)

Third quarter

- (9:18) MINN – Jalen Smith 9-yard pass from Drake Lindsey, Brady Denaburg kick (Drive: 13 plays, 85 yards, 5:39; Rutgers 21–21)
- (0:11) MINN – Brady Denaburg 26-yard field goal (Drive: 14 plays, 75 yards, 6:59; Minnesota 24–21)

Fourth quarter

- (11:28) RUTG – Athan Kaliakmanis 4-yard run, Jai Patel kick (Drive: 9 plays, 75 yards, 3:43; Rutgers 28–24)
- (3:19) MINN – Javon Tracy 4-yard pass from Drake Lindsey, Brady Denaburg kick (Drive: 7 plays, 72 yards, 3:05; Minnesota 31–28)

Statistics	RUTG	MINN
First downs	29	20
Plays–yards	76–387	59–359
Rushes–yards	42–138	18–35
Passing yards	249	324
Passing: comp–att–int	21–34–1	31–41–0
Turnovers	1	0
Time of possession	31:05	28:55

Team	Category	Player	Statistics
Rutgers	Passing	Athan Kaliakmanis	21/34, 249 yards, 2 TD, INT
Rutgers	Rushing	Antwan Raymond	26 carries, 161 yards, 2 TD
Rutgers	Receiving	KJ Duff	6 receptions, 84 yards, TD
Minnesota	Passing	Drake Lindsey	31/41, 324 yards, 3 TD
Minnesota	Rushing	Fame Ijeboi	12 carries, 37 yards, TD
Minnesota	Receiving	Jalen Smith	4 receptions, 103 yards, TD

=== at Washington ===
Rutgers Scarlet Knights (3–2) at Washington Huskies (4–1) – Game summary

Quarter	1	2	3	4	Total
Scarlet Knights	10	3	6	0	19
Huskies	0	10	21	7	38

at Husky Stadium • Seattle, Washington

- Date: October 10
- Game time: 9:00 p.m.
- Game weather: Cloudy • Temperature: 60 °F (16 °C) • Wind: S at 7 miles per hour (11 km/h)
- Game attendance: 63,743
- Referee: Kole Knueppel
- TV announcers (FS1): Noah Reed (play-by-play) and Robert Smith (analyst)

Game information

First quarter

- (13:42) RUTG – KJ Duff 20-yard pass from Athan Kaliakmanis, Jai Patel kick (Drive: 4 plays, 75 yards, 1:18; Rutgers 7–0)
- (5:38) RUTG – Jai Patel 35-yard field goal (Drive: 12 plays, 62 yards, 5:15; Rutgers 10–0)

Second quarter

- (13:21) WASH – Denzel Boston 23-yard pass from Demond Williams Jr., Grady Gross kick (Drive: 3 plays, 50 yards, 1:20; Rutgers 10–7)
- (0:39) RUTG – Jai Patel 37-yard field goal (Drive: 8 plays, 78 yards, 1:21; Rutgers 13–7)
- (0:00) WASH – Grady Gross 36-yard field goal (Drive: 5 plays, 57 yards, 0:39; Rutgers 13–10)

Third quarter

- (13:01) WASH – Jonah Coleman 1-yard run, Grady Gross kick (Drive: 4 plays, 75 yards, 1:54; Washington 17–13)
- (10:06) WASH – Denzel Boston 38-yard pass from Demond Williams Jr., Grady Gross kick (Drive: 3 plays, 60 yards, 1:13; Washington 24–13)
- (9:17) RUTG – Antwan Raymond 48-yard pass from Athan Kaliakmanis (Drive: 2 plays, 75 yards, 0:49; Washington 24–19)
- (2:53) WASH – Demond Williams Jr. 11-yard run, Grady Gross kick (Drive: 12 plays, 75 yards, 6:24; Washington 31–19)

Fourth quarter

- (6:52) WASH – Demond Williams Jr. 7-yard run, Grady Gross kick (Drive: 8 plays, 97 yards, 4:54; Washington 38–19)

Statistics	RUTG	WASH
First downs	25	26
Plays–yards	77–493	59–579
Rushes–yards	27–107	32–177
Passing yards	386	402
Passing: comp–att–int	31–50–1	21–27–0
Turnovers	1	1
Time of possession	30:12	29:48

Team	Category	Player	Statistics
Rutgers	Passing	Athan Kaliakmanis	31/50, 386 yards, 2 TD, INT
Rutgers	Rushing	Antwan Raymond	15 carries, 89 yards
Rutgers	Receiving	Ian Strong	7 receptions, 124 yards
Washington	Passing	Demond Williams Jr.	21/27, 402 yards, 2 TD
Washington	Rushing	Demond Williams Jr.	13 carries, 136 yards, 2 TD
Washington	Receiving	Dezmen Roebuck	4 receptions, 108 yards

=== vs No. 8 Oregon ===
No. 8 Oregon Ducks (5–1) at Rutgers Scarlet Knights (3–3) – Game summary

Quarter	1	2	3	4	Total
No. 8 Ducks	14	28	14	0	56
Scarlet Knights	3	0	0	7	10

at SHI Stadium • Piscataway, New Jersey

- Date: October 18
- Game time: 6:30 p.m.
- Game weather: Cloudy • Temperature: 63 °F (17 °C) • Wind: SE at 4 miles per hour (6.4 km/h)
- Game attendance: 53,127
- Referee: Gregory Blum
- TV announcers (BTN): Guy Haberman (play-by-play), Jake Butt (analyst), and Brooke Fletcher (sideline)

Game information

First quarter

- (13:18) RUTG – Jai Patel 51-yard field goal (Drive: 4 plays, 0 yards, 0:17; Rutgers 3-0)
- (11:52) ORE – Noah Whittington 68-yard run, Atticus Sappington kick (Drive: 3 plays, 75 yards, 1:26; Oregon 7-3)
- (6:25) ORE – Kenyon Sadiq 30-yard pass from Dante Moore, Atticus Sappington kick (Drive: 10 plays, 87 yards, 4:05; Oregon 14-3)

Second quarter

- (14:02) ORE – Kenyon Sadiq 21-yard pass from Dante Moore, Gage Hurych kick (Drive: 4 plays, 79 yards, 1:39; Oregon 21-3)
- (11:34) ORE – Dakorien Moore 34-yard pass from Dante Moore, Atticus Sappington kick (Drive: 3 plays, 49 yards, 1:04; Oregon 28-3)
- (8:54) ORE – Noah Whittington 28-yard run, Atticus Sappington kick (Drive: 4 plays, 72 yards, 1:26; Oregon 35-3)
- (0:43) ORE – Noah Whittington 5-yard pass from Dante Moore, Gage Hurych kick (Drive: 3 plays, 75 yards, 1:26; Oregon 42-3)

Third quarter

- (11:44) ORE – Jordon Davison 20-yard run, Gage Hurych kick (Drive: 2 plays, 87 yards, 0:56; Oregon 49-3)
- (3:42) ORE – Dierre Hall Jr. 35-yard run, Gage Hurych kick (Drive: 3 plays, 58 yards, 1:36; Oregon 56-3)

Fourth quarter

- (6:40) RUTG – Ja'shon Benjamin 7-yard run, Jai Patel kick (Drive: 9 plays, 30 yards, 4:07; Oregon 56-10)

Statistics	ORE	RUTG
First downs	29	12
Plays–yards	61–750	69–202
Rushes–yards	37–415	42–123
Passing yards	335	79
Passing: comp–att–int	18–24–1	8–27–2
Turnovers	3	3
Time of possession	27:53	32:07

Team	Category	Player	Statistics
Oregon	Passing	Dante Moore	15/20, 290 yards, 4 TD, INT
Oregon	Rushing	Noah Whittington	11 carries, 125 yards, 2 TD
Oregon	Receiving	Kenyon Sadiq	4 receptions, 80 yards, 2 TD
Rutgers	Passing	Athan Kaliakmanis	8/25, 79 yards, 2 INT
Rutgers	Rushing	Ja'shon Benjamin	18 carries, 69 yards, TD
Rutgers	Receiving	KJ Duff	3 receptions, 41 yards

=== at Purdue ===
Rutgers Scarlet Knights (3–4) at Purdue Boilermakers (2–5) – Game summary

Quarter	1	2	3	4	Total
Scarlet Knights	0	7	7	13	27
Boilermakers	10	0	7	7	24

at Ross–Ade Stadium • West Lafayette, Indiana

- Date: October 25
- Game time: 12:00 p.m.
- Game weather: Cloudy • Temperature: 49 °F (9 °C) • Wind: NE at 5 miles per hour (8.0 km/h)
- Game attendance: 55,289
- Referee: Chris Coyte
- TV announcers (BTN): Guy Haberman (play-by-play), Yogi Roth (analyst) and Rhett Lewis (sideline)

Game information

First quarter

- (10:24) PUR – Malachi Thomas 8-yard pass from Malachi Singleton, Spencer Porath kick (Drive: 7 plays, 77 yards, 3:03; Purdue 7-0)
- (0:08) PUR – Spencer Porath 20-yard field goal (Drive: 11 plays, 92 yards, 5:33; Purdue 10-0)

Second quarter

- (0:12) RUTG – Antwan Raymond 1-yard run, Jai Patel kick (Drive: 17 plays, 85 yards, 5:32; Purdue 10-7)

Third quarter

- (13:10) PUR – Devin Mockobee 3-yard pass from Malachi Singleton, Spencer Porath kick (Drive: 4 plays, 75 yards, 1:50; Purdue 17-7)
- (7:33) RUTG – KJ Duff 72-yard pass from Athan Kaliakmanis, Jai Patel kick (Drive: 5 plays, 90 yards, 2:46; Purdue 17-14)

Fourth quarter

- (7:45) RUTG – Athan Kaliakmanis 1-yard run, Jai Patel kick (Drive: 7 plays, 90 yards, 4:32; Rutgers 21-17)
- (4:43) PUR – Nitro Tuggle 14-yard pass from Ryan Browne, Spencer Porath kick (Drive: 7 plays, 41 yards, 2:54; Purdue 24-21)
- (1:06) RUTG – Jai Patel 20-yard field goal (Drive: 11 plays, 73 yards, 3:37; 24-24)
- (0:00) RUTG – Jai Patel 30-yard field goal (Drive: 3 plays, 17 yards, 0:59; Rutgers 27-24)

Statistics	RUTG	PUR
First downs	22	14
Plays–yards	75–543	51–345
Rushes–yards	48–184	28–217
Passing yards	359	128
Passing: comp–att–int	19–27–0	13–23–0
Turnovers	1	1
Time of possession	36:58	23:02

Team	Category	Player	Statistics
Rutgers	Passing	Athan Kaliakmanis	19/27, 359 yards, TD
Rutgers	Rushing	Antwan Raymond	29 carries, 116 yards, TD
Rutgers	Receiving	KJ Duff	6 receptions, 241 yards, TD
Purdue	Passing	Ryan Browne	11/20, 117 yards, TD
Purdue	Rushing	Devin Mockobee	16 carries, 91 yards
Purdue	Receiving	Malachi Thomas	3 receptions, 50 yards, TD

=== at Illinois ===
Rutgers Scarlet Knights (4–4) at Illinois Fighting Illini (5–3) – Game summary

Quarter	1	2	3	4	Total
Scarlet Knights	0	6	0	7	13
Fighting Illini	7	14	14	0	35

at Gies Memorial Stadium • Champaign, Illinois

- Date: November 1
- Game time: 12:00 p.m.
- Game weather: Sunny • Temperature: 47 °F (8 °C) • Wind: W at 8 miles per hour (13 km/h)
- Game attendance: 60,670
- Referee: Ron Snodgrass
- TV announcers (NBC): Paul Burmeister (play-by-play), Jason Garrett (analyst), and Zora Stephenson (sideline reporter)

Game information

First quarter

- (4:04) ILL – Kaden Feagin 7-yard pass from Luke Altmyer, David Olano kick (Drive: 12 plays, 99 yards, 6:11; Illinois 7-0)

Second quarter

- (13:41) RUTG – Jai Patel 26-yard field goal (Drive: 13 plays, 67 yards, 5:23; Illinois 7-3)
- (5:45) RUTG – Jai Patel 40-yard field goal (Drive: 10 plays, 24 yards, 4:49; Illinois 7-6)
- (2:04) ILL – Luke Altmyer 3-yard run, David Olano kick (Drive: 9 plays, 75 yards, 3:41; Illinois 14-6)
- (0:29) ILL – Hank Beatty 1-yard pass from Luke Altmyer, David Olano kick (Drive: 8 plays, 70 yards, 0:58; Illinois 21-6)

Third quarter

- (10:40) ILL – Hudson Clement 20-yard pass from Luke Altmyer, David Olano kick (Drive: 9 plays, 75 yards, 4:20; Illinois 28-6)
- (3:25) ILL – Collin Dixon 7-yard pass from Luke Altmyer, David Olano kick (Drive: 11 plays, 65 yards, 5:47; Illinois 35-6)

Fourth quarter

- (5:47) RUTG – KJ Duff 3-yard pass from Athan Kaliakmanis, Jai Patel kick (Drive: 8 plays, 73 yards, 4:33; Illinois 35-13)

Statistics	RUTG	ILL
First downs	19	26
Plays–yards	72–312	69–445
Rushes–yards	27–59	38–210
Passing yards	253	235
Passing: comp–att–int	25–45–0	19–31–1
Turnovers	0	1
Time of possession	27:25	32:35

Team	Category	Player	Statistics
Rutgers	Passing	Athan Kaliakmanis	25/45, 253 yards, TD
Rutgers	Rushing	Ja'shon Benjamin	8 carries, 37 yards
Rutgers	Receiving	KJ Duff	9 receptions, 93 yards, TD
Illinois	Passing	Luke Altmyer	19/31, 235 yards, 4 TD, INT
Illinois	Rushing	Luke Altmyer	7 carries, 88 yards, TD
Illinois	Receiving	Hudson Clement	5 receptions, 84 yards, TD

=== vs Maryland ===
Maryland Terrapins (4–4) at Rutgers Scarlet Knights (4–5) – Game summary

Quarter	1	2	3	4	Total
Terrapins	7	10	0	3	20
Scarlet Knights	0	21	7	7	35

at SHI Stadium • Piscataway, New Jersey

- Date: November 8
- Game time: 2:30 p.m.
- Game weather: Sunny • Temperature: 66 °F (19 °C) • Wind: NW at 7 miles per hour (11 km/h)
- Game attendance: 41,032
- Referee: Tim O'Dey
- TV announcers (FS1): Noah Reed (play-by-play) and Robert Smith (analyst)

Game information

First quarter

- (14:23) MD – Malik Washington 73-yard run, Sean O'Haire kick (Drive: 2 plays, 75 yards, 0:37; Maryland 7-0)

Second quarter

- (11:56) RUTG – DT Sheffield 9-yard pass from Athan Kaliakmanis, Jai Patel kick (Drive: 7 plays, 53 yards, 3:23; 7-7)
- (5:53) MD – Sean O'Haire 27-yard field goal (Drive: 10 plays, 71 yards, 5:58; Maryland 10-7)
- (4:14) RUTG – Ian Strong 45-yard pass from Athan Kaliakmanis, Jai Patel kick (Drive: 3 plays, 75 yards, 1:38; Rutgers 14-10)
- (3:08) MD – Kaleb Webb 21-yard pass from Malik Washington, Sean O'Haire kick (Drive: 3 plays, 80 yards, 1:00; Maryland 17-14)
- (0:34) RUTG – Ian Strong 5-yard pass from Athan Kaliakmanis, Jai Patel kick (Drive: 10 plays, 75 yards, 2:34; Rutgers 21-17)

Third quarter

- (10:26) RUTG – Ian Strong 14-yard pass from Athan Kaliakmanis, Jai Patel kick (Drive: 8 plays, 75 yards, 4:34; Rutgers 28-17)

Fourth quarter

- (13:34) MD – Sean O'Haire 44-yard field goal (Drive: 8 plays, 75 yards, 4:34; Rutgers 28-17)
- (4:10) RUTG – Antwan Raymond 5-yard run, Jai Patel kick (Drive: 9 plays, 66 yards, 5:24; Rutgers 35-20)

Statistics	MD	RUTG
First downs	14	25
Plays–yards	57–403	69–485
Rushes–yards	29–305	49–256
Passing yards	98	229
Passing: comp–att–int	15-28-1	13-20-2
Turnovers	1	2
Time of possession	25:02	34:58

Team	Category	Player	Statistics
Maryland	Passing	Malik Washington	15/28, 98 yards, TD, INT
Maryland	Rushing	Malik Washington	8 carries, 164 yards, TD
Maryland	Receiving	Dorian Fleming	4 receptions, 39 yards
Rutgers	Passing	Athan Kaliakmanis	13/20, 229 yards, 4 TD, 2 INT
Rutgers	Rushing	Antwan Raymond	41 carries, 240 yards, TD
Rutgers	Receiving	Ian Strong	5 receptions, 88 yards, 3 TD

=== at No. 1 Ohio State ===
Rutgers Scarlet Knights (5–5) at No. 1 Ohio State Buckeyes (10–0) – Game summary

Quarter	1	2	3	4	Total
Scarlet Knights	0	3	0	6	9
No. 1 Buckeyes	7	7	14	14	42

at Ohio Stadium • Columbus, Ohio

- Date: November 22
- Game time: 12:00 p.m.
- Game weather: Sunny • Temperature: 48 °F (9 °C) • Wind: N at 9 miles per hour (14 km/h)
- Game attendance: 100,023
- Referee: Chris Coyte
- TV announcers (FOX): Gus Johnson (play-by-play), Joel Klatt (analyst), and Jenny Taft (sideline reporter)

Game information

First quarter

- (4:01) OSU – Bo Jackson 15-yard run, Jayden Fielding kick (Drive: 3 plays, 29 yards, 1:46; Ohio State 7–0)

Second quarter

- (11:50) RUTG – Jai Patel 44-yard field goal (Drive: 15 plays, 49 yards, 7:11; Ohio State 7–3)
- (2:27) OSU – Brandon Inniss 7-yard pass from Julian Sayin, Jayden Fielding kick (Drive: 11 plays, 98 yards, 6:50; Ohio State 14–3)

Third quarter

- (7:00) OSU – Max Klare 11-yard pass from Julian Sayin, Jayden Fielding kick (Drive: 3 plays, 1 yard, 0:40; Ohio State 21–3)
- (2:30) OSU – Bo Jackson 10-yard run, Jayden Fielding kick (Drive: 7 plays, 70 yards, 3:36; Ohio State 28–3)

Fourth quarter

- (11:39) OSU – CJ Donaldson 5-yard run, Jayden Fielding kick (Drive: 7 plays, 70 yards, 4:18; Ohio State 35–3)
- (6:43) RUTG – Antwan Raymond 1-yard run, pass failed (Drive: 8 plays, 71 yards, 4:51; Ohio State 35–9)
- (4:17) OSU – James Peoples 49-yard run, Jayden Fielding kick (Drive: 4 plays, 75 yards, 2:26; Ohio State 42–9)

Statistics	RUTG	OSU
First downs	12	25
Plays–yards	55–147	60–430
Rushes–yards	35–66	38–254
Passing yards	81	176
Passing: comp–att–int	10–20–0	14–22–0
Turnovers	1	1
Time of possession	27:11	32:49

Team	Category	Player	Statistics
Rutgers	Passing	Athan Kaliakmanis	10/20, 81 yards
Rutgers	Rushing	Antwan Raymond	15 carries, 52 yards, TD
Rutgers	Receiving	KJ Duff	2 receptions, 34 yards
Ohio State	Passing	Julian Sayin	13/19, 157 yards, 2 TD
Ohio State	Rushing	Bo Jackson	19 carries, 110 yards, 2 TD
Ohio State	Receiving	Max Klare	7 receptions, 105 yards, TD

=== vs Penn State ===
Penn State Nittany Lions (5-6) at Rutgers Scarlet Knights (5-6) – Game summary

Quarter	1	2	3	4	Total
Nittany Lions	14	10	9	7	40
Scarlet Knights	14	7	7	8	36

at SHI Stadium • Piscataway, New Jersey

- Date: November 29
- Game time: 3:30 p.m. EST
- Game weather: 42 °F (6 °C) • Sunny
- Game attendance: 55,212
- Referee: Bryan Banks
- TV announcers (BTN): Jeff Levering (play-by-play), Jake Butt (analyst) and Brooke Fletcher (sideline)
- ESPN box score

Game information

First quarter

- RUTG – Antwan Raymond 19-yard run (Jai Patel kick), 12:13. Scarlet Knights 7–0. Drive: 5 plays, 75 yards, 2:47.
- PSU – Andrew Rappleyea 53-yard pass from Ethan Grunkemeyer (Ryan Barker kick), 9:46. Tied 7–7. Drive: 4 plays, 62 yards, 2:23.
- PSU – Nicholas Singleton 11-yard run (Ryan Barker kick), 5:11. Nittany Lions 14–7. Drive: 4 plays, 75 yards, 1:54.
- RUTG – Athan Kaliakmanis 2-yard run (Jai Patel kick), 1:30. Tied 14–14. Drive: 7 plays, 75 yards, 3:36.

Second quarter

- PSU – Kaytron Allen 15-yard run (Ryan Barker kick), 14:55. Nittany Lions 21–14. Drive: 4 plays, 89 yards, 1:27.
- RUTG – DT Sheffield 21-yard pass from Athan Kaliakmanis (Jai Patel kick), 0:27. Tied 21–21. Drive: 11 plays, 89 yards, 4:37.
- PSU – Ryan Barker 31-yard field goal, 0:01. Nittany Lions 24–21. Drive: 5 plays, 56 yards, 0:26.

Third quarter

- PSU – Ryan Barker 29-yard field goal, 8:53. Nittany Lions 27–21. Drive: 10 plays, 50 yards, 6:02.
- RUTG – KJ Duff 13-yard pass from Athan Kaliakmanis (Jai Patel kick), 3:51. Scarlet Knights 28–27. Drive: 8 plays, 75 yards, 5:02.
- PSU – Nicholas Singleton 1-yard run (pass failed), 0:54. Nittany Lions 33–28. Drive: 6 plays, 83 yards, 2:53.

Fourth quarter

- RUTG – Antwan Raymond 46-yard pass from Athan Kaliakmanis (Athan Kaliakmanis–KJ Duff pass), 13:33. Scarlet Knights 36–33. Drive: 4 plays, 75 yards, 2:21.
- PSU – Amare Campbell 61-yard fumble return (Ryan Barker kick), 7:27. Nittany Lions 40–36.

Statistics	PSU	RUTG
First downs	23	27
Plays–yards	54–509	64–533
Rushes–yards	33–300	42–195
Passing yards	209	338
Passing: comp–att–int	17–21–0	16–22–0
Turnovers	0	1
Time of possession	27:35	32:25

Team	Category	Player	Statistics
Penn State	Passing	Ethan Grunkemeyer	17/21, 209 yards, TD
Penn State	Rushing	Kaytron Allen	22 carries, 226 yards, TD
Penn State	Receiving	Andrew Rappleyea	4 receptions, 75 yards, TD
Rutgers	Passing	Athan Kaliakmanis	16/22, 338 yards, 3 TD
Rutgers	Rushing	Antwan Raymond	29 carries, 189 yards, TD
Rutgers	Receiving	KJ Duff	5 receptions, 127 yards, TD

== Personnel ==
2025 Rutgers Scarlet Knights football team roster
Players
Coaches
Offense

Pos.	#	Name	Class
WR	0	DT Sheffield	Sr
WR	1	Famah Toure	Jr
WR	2	Ben Black	So
RB	3	Antwan Raymond	So
WR	4	Jourdin Houston	Fr
RB	5	CJ Campbell Jr.	Sr
QB	6	Sean Ashenfelder	Fr
WR	7	Dylan Braithwaite	Jr
WR	8	K. J. Duff	So
WR	9	Ian Strong	Jr
QB	10	A. J. Surace	So
TE	11	Logan Blake	Jr
TE	12	Kenny Fletcher	Sr
WR	13	Vernon Allen III	Fr
WR	14	Sah'nye Degraffenreidt	Fr
QB	16	Athan Kaliakmanis	Sr
QB	17	Rocco Rainone	So
TE	18	Colin Weber	Sr
RB	20	Ja'Shon Benjamin	Jr
RB	23	Edd Guerrier	So
TE	24	Ben Rothhaar	Fr
WR	25	Trent Osborn	So
RB	26	Terrell Mitchell	Fr
RB	27	Samuel Brown V	Sr
RB	28	Xavier Williams	So
WR	39	Salomon Ealey	Fr
OL	51	Raymond Giacobbe	So
OL	53	Hank Zilinskas	Jr
OL	54	Taj White	Sr
OL	55	Nick Oliveira	Jr
OL	56	Tyler Needham	Sr
OL	58	Carter Kadow	So
OL	59	Gus Zilinskas	Sr
OL	61	Emir Stinette	Sr
OL	64	Joshua Blackston	Fr
OL	65	Bryan Felter	Sr
OL	67	Chris Vigna	Fr
OL	68	Ryder Langsdale	Sr
OL	69	Kwabena Asamoah	Sr
OL	70	Zach Aamland	Jr
OL	71	John Stone	Jr
OL	72	Jayden Elijah	Fr
OL	73	Terrence Salami	Sr
OL	74	Moshood Giwa	Jr
OL	75	Raynor Andrews	So
OL	76	Dantae Chin	Sr
OL	77	Kenny Jones	So
OL	78	Miron Gurman	Fr
OL	79	Justin Cesaire	Sr
WR	80	Michael Thomas III	Fr
TE	82	Jackson Gister	So
WR	83	Dino Kaliakmanis	Sr
TE	84	Ryan Bayoumy	Fr
WR	85	Ben Rosenblatt	Jr
TE	86	Liam Kilcomons	So
TE	87	Monte Keener	So
TE	88	Mike Higgins	Sr
WR	89	Dane Pardridge	Sr

Defense

Pos.	#	Name	Class
DL	0	Doug Blue-Eli	Sr
DL	1	Jordan Walker	Sr
LB	2	Moses Walker	Sr
DB	3	Bo Mascoe	Jr
LB	4	Sam Robinson	So
DB	5	Kaj Sanders	So
LB	6	Abram Wright	Jr
DB	7	Cam Miller	Sr
LB	8	Dariel Djabome	Sr
DB	9	Jett Elad	Sr
DB	10	Jacobie Henderson	Sr
DB	11	Steven Murray	Fr
DB	12	Renick Dorilas	Fr
LB	13	DJ McClary	Fr
DL	14	Jordan Thompson	Sr
DB	15	Zilan Williams	Sr
DB	16	Jesse Ofurie	Jr
LB	17	M. J. Johnson	So
DL	18	Canaan Edwards	Fr
DB	19	Davoun Fuse	Jr
DB	21	Al-Shadee Salaam	Sr
DB	22	Michael Clayton	Fr
LB	23	Isaiah Deloatch	Fr
DB	24	Kevin Levy	So
DB	25	D. K. Gilley	So
DB	26	Isaiah Crumpler	So
DB	27	Sage Clawges	Jr
DB	28	Cannon Marshall	Fr
DB	29	Sebastian Jusma	Sr
DL	30	Elijah King	So
DB	31	Michael Robinson II	Sr
LB	33	John Insinga	Fr
DB	34	Noah Shaw	So
LB	36	Kamar Archie	Fr
LB	37	Talibi Kaba	Fr
DB	38	Timmy Ward	Sr
DL	42	D. J. Allen	Sr
DB	44	Tariq Hayer	Fr
DB	45	Shawn Purcell	Jr
DL	48	Raedyn Bruens	Fr
LB	49	Evan Ward	Sr
LB	50	Joe Nwachukwu	So
DL	55	Zaire Angoy	Sr
DL	56	Sean Cooper	Sr
LB	59	Liam Gilmore	So
DL	88	Jyon Simon	Fr
DL	90	Farell Gnago	So
DL	91	Djibril Abdou Rahman	Jr
DL	92	Darold DeNgohe	Jr
DL	94	Bradley Weaver	Sr
DL	95	Henry Hughes Jr.	Sr
DL	96	Keshon Griffin	Sr
DL	97	Anthony Morales	So
DL	98	Braxton Kyle	Fr
DL	99	Eric O'Neill	Sr

Special teams

Pos.	#	Name	Class
K	29	Dane Pizzaro	So
K	44	Jai Patel	Sr
LS	46	Sammy El Hadidi	Sr
LS	68	Matthew Murri	Jr
K	93	Jack Scullion	So
P	94	Jakob Anderson	So
K	97	Riley McCann	Jr
LS	99	Michael O'Connor	Sr

Head coach

- Greg Schiano

Coordinators/assistant coaches

- Kirk Ciarrocca – Offensive coordinator/quarterbacks
- Robb Smith – Co-defensive coordinator
- Zach Sparber – Defensive coordinator/linebackers
- Colin Ferrell – Defense linemen
- Julian Campenni – Defensive ends
- Vic Hall – Safeties
- David Rowe – Cornerbacks
- Charlie Noonan – Defensive tackles
- Dave Brock – Wide receivers
- Damiere Shaw – Running backs
- Pat Flaherty – Offensive linemen
- Scott Vallone – Tight ends
- Spencer Brown – Director, sports performance

Legend

- (C) Team captain
- (S) Suspended
- (I) Ineligible
- Injured
- Redshirt

Roster
Last update: 08/06/25
