= KAJ =

KAJ may refer to:

- KAJ (group), a music and comedy group from Finland
- KAJJ-CD, TV station known as KAJ, in Kalispell, Montana, US
- Khal Adath Jeshurun (Washington Heights, Manhattan), NYS, US; a synagogue in New York City
- Kareem Abdul-Jabbar (born 1947), American professional basketball player
- Karthago Airlines (ICAO airline code KAJ), a Tunisian airline
- Kajaani Airport (IATA airport code KAJ), Paltaniemi, Kajaani, Finland

== See also ==
- Kaj (disambiguation)
- KAI (disambiguation)
- KAY (disambiguation)
