= Antwan Raymond =

Canadian football player

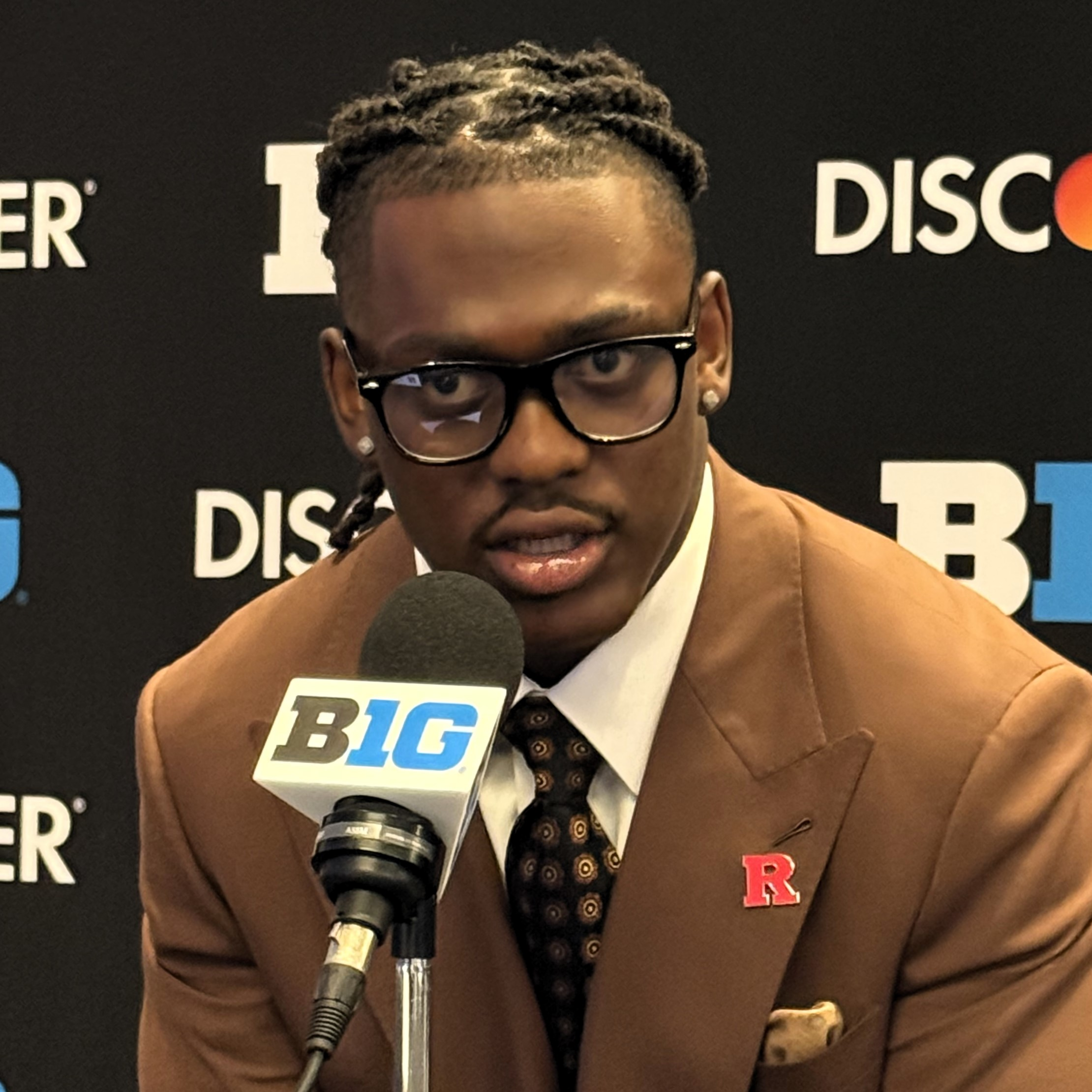
- Raymond at 2026 Big Ten Media Day

No. 3 – Rutgers Scarlet Knights
- Position: Running back
- Class: Junior

Personal information
- Born: July 13, 2005 (age 21); Montreal, Quebec, Canada
- Listed height: 5 ft 11 in (1.80 m)
- Listed weight: 205 lb (93 kg)

Career information
- High school: Clearwater Academy International (Clearwater, Florida, U.S.)
- College: Rutgers (2024–present)

Awards and highlights
- Jon Cornish Trophy (2025); Second-team All-Big Ten (2025)
- Stats at ESPN

Antwan Raymond is a Canadian college football running back for the Rutgers Scarlet Knights. Raymond won the 2025 Jon Cornish Trophy as the top Canadian player in NCAA football.

== Early life ==
Raymond attended high school in Quebec, Canada before transferring to Clearwater Academy International in Clearwater, Florida in 2023. As a senior, he rushed for 1,884 yards on 233 carries with 22 touchdowns. He reclassified to the 2024 class and committed to Rutgers University to play college football.

== College career ==
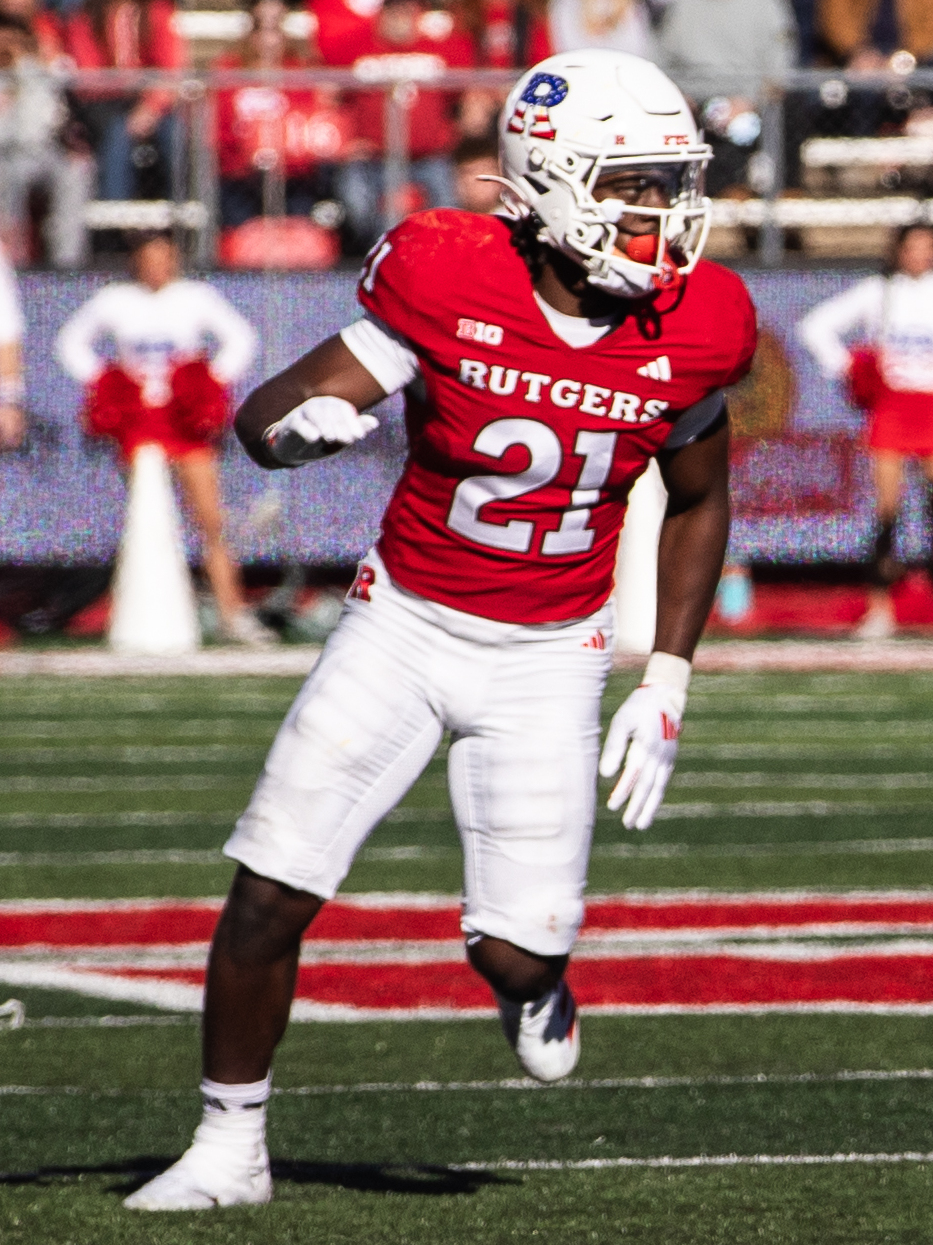
Raymond in 2024.

Raymond spent his true freshman year at Rutgers in 2024 as a backup to Kyle Monangai. With Monangai opting out of the 2024 Rate Bowl, Raymond started and rushed for 113 yards with three touchdowns. Overall for the season he played in 10 games with two starts and set the school true freshman record with 457 rushing yards on 100 carries with eight touchdowns. With Monangai in the NFL, Raymond took over as the starting running back in 2025.

=== Statistics ===
Year	Team	Games		Rushing				Receiving			
Year	Team	GP	GS	Att	Yds	Avg	TD	Rec	Yds	Avg	TD
2024	Rutgers	10	2	100	457	4.6	8	3	44	14.7	0
2025	Rutgers	12	12	244	1,241	5.1	13	18	225	12.5	2
2026	Rutgers	4	4	78	438	5.6	4	7	65	9.3	1
Career		26	16	422	2,136	5.1	25	28	334	11.9	3
