= Kaj Stenvall =

Finnish artist (born 1951)

Kaj Kristian Stenvall (born 25 December 1951 in Tampere) is a Finnish artist who became internationally famous when he began his career in 1989 for painting what his site describes as "a very familiar looking duck". Many have likened this duck to the Donald Duck of Disney comics.
