= Kaj, Sistan and Baluchestan =

Kaj كج
- Village
- Location within Iran
- Coordinates: 27°24′35″N 60°49′44″E
- Country: Iran
- Province: Sistan and Baluchestan
- County: Iranshahr
- Bakhsh: Central
- Rural District: Damen

Population (2006)
  - Total: 210
- Time zone: UTC+3:30 (IRST)
  - Summer (DST): UTC+4:30 (IRDT)

Kaj (Persian: كج) is a village in Damen Rural District, in the Central District of Iranshahr County, Sistan and Baluchestan Province, Iran. At the 2006 census, its population was 210, in 46 families.
