= Kaj, Isfahan =

Kaj كاج
- Village
- Location within Iran
- Coordinates: 32°32′21″N 51°50′03″E
- Country: Iran
- Province: Isfahan
- County: Isfahan
- Bakhsh: Central
- Rural District: Baraan-e Shomali

Population (2006)
  - Total: 304
- Time zone: UTC+3:30 (IRST)
  - Summer (DST): UTC+4:30 (IRDT)

Kaj (Persian: كاج, also Romanized as Kāj) is a village in Baraan-e Shomali Rural District, in the Central District of Isfahan County, Isfahan Province, Iran. At the 2006 census, its population was 304, in 76 families.
