= Kaj Sanders =

American football player (born 2006)

No. 1 – Rutgers Scarlet Knights
- Position: Defensive back
- Class: Junior

Personal information
- Born: January 4, 2006 (age 20)
- Listed height: 6 ft 1 in (1.85 m)
- Listed weight: 200 lb (91 kg)

Career information
- High school: Bergen Catholic (Oradell, New Jersey)
- College: Rutgers (2024–present)
- Stats at ESPN

Kaj Sanders (born January 4, 2006) is an American football defensive back for the Rutgers Scarlet Knights.

== Early life ==
Sanders attended Bergen Catholic High School in Bergen County, New Jersey, and committed to play college football for the Rutgers Scarlet Knights.

== College career ==
Sanders entered his true freshman season in 2024 as a starter, becoming the second-ever defender to start the season opener as a true freshman for the Scarlet Knights in a victory over Howard. He appeared in all 13 games with six starts, racking up 43 tackles and four pass deflections. Sanders entered his sophomore season in 2025 as a full-time starter. During the 2025 season, he appeared in all 12 games, recording 65 tackles, a pass deflection, two blocked kicks, and a return touchdown.

== Personal life ==
Sanders is the son of former Virginia football player, LaQuan Sanders.
