= 2025 Presbyterian Blue Hose football team =

American college football season

2025 Presbyterian Blue Hose football
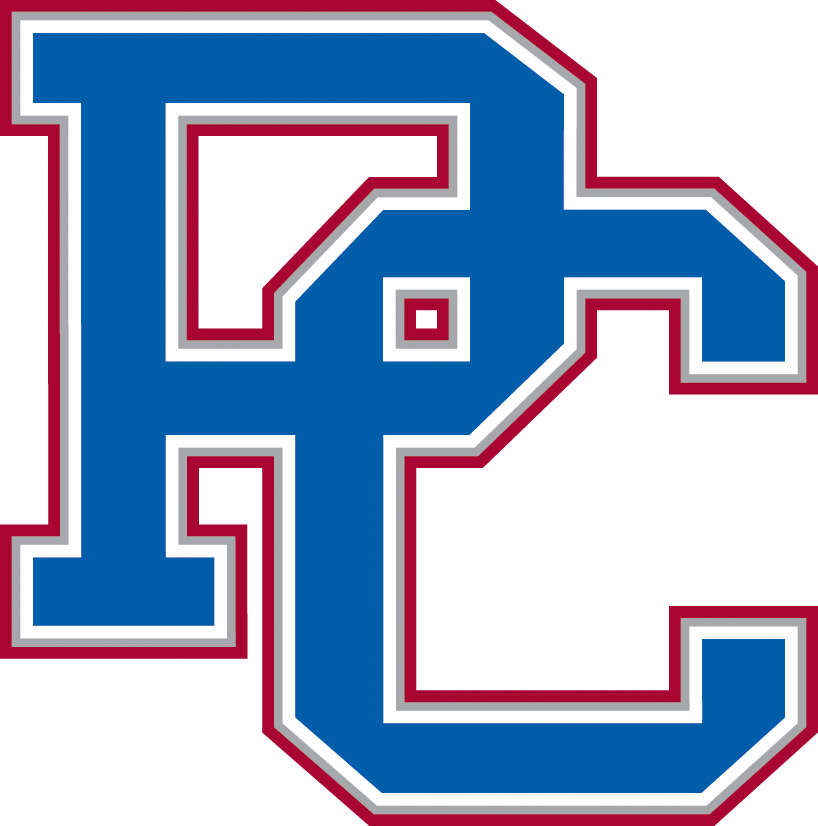
- Conference: Pioneer Football League
- Record: 10–2 (6–2 PFL)
- Head coach: Steve Englehart (4th season)
- Offensive coordinator: Jayson Martin (4th season)
- Defensive coordinator: Daniel Owen (4th season)
- Home stadium: Bailey Memorial Stadium

2025 Pioneer Football League standings
	Conf.			Overall
Team	W		L	W		L
Drake $^	7	–	1	8	–	4
Presbyterian	6	–	2	10	–	2
San Diego	6	–	2	8	–	4
St. Thomas	5	–	3	7	–	5
Dayton	5	–	3	7	–	4
Morehead State	4	–	4	6	–	6
Butler	4	–	4	6	–	6
Marist	3	–	5	5	–	7
Stetson	2	–	6	3	–	9
Davidson	1	–	7	2	–	10
Valparaiso	1	–	7	2	–	10
$ – Conference champion; ^ – FCS playoff participant; Rankings from STATS Poll

The 2025 Presbyterian Blue Hose football team represented Presbyterian College as a member of the Pioneer Football League (PFL) during the 2025 NCAA Division I FCS football season. The Blue Hose were led by fourth-year head coach Steve Englehart and played home games at Bailey Memorial Stadium located in Clinton, South Carolina.

== Schedule ==
Date	Time	Opponent	Rank	Site	TV	Result	Attendance
August 30	6:00 p.m.	at No. 11 Mercer*		Five Star Stadium; Macon, GA	ESPN+	W 15–10	8,149
September 6	2:00 p.m.	at Furman*		Paladin Stadium; Greenville, SC	ESPN+	W 39–38 ^{OT}	7,897
September 13	7:00 p.m.	Erskine*		Bailey Memorial Stadium; Clinton, SC	ESPN+	W 42–14	4,372
September 20	1:00 p.m.	Bluefield*		Bailey Memorial Stadium; Clinton, SC	ESPN+	W 76–3	3,930
September 27	1:00 p.m.	Morehead State	No. 25	Bailey Memorial Stadium; Clinton, SC	ESPN+	W 41–0	3,661
October 11	1:00 p.m.	at Butler	No. 24	Bud and Jackie Sellick Bowl; Indianapolis, IN	FloFootball	W 31–25	3,682
October 18	1:00 p.m.	Stetson	No. 21	Bailey Memorial Stadium; Clinton, SC	ESPN+	W 42–7	7,435
October 25	12:00 p.m.	at Dayton	No. 19	Welcome Stadium; Dayton, OH	YouTube	L 19–35	2,687
November 1	1:00 p.m.	Valparaiso	No. 25	Bailey Memorial Stadium; Clinton, SC	ESPN+	W 43–14	2,239
November 8	5:00 p.m.	at Davidson	No. 25	Davidson College Stadium; Davidson, NC	ESPN+	L 13–14	2,373
November 15	2:00 p.m.	at St. Thomas		O'Shaughnessy Stadium; Saint Paul, MN	Midco Sports Plus	W 23–9	2,375
November 22	1:00 p.m.	Marist		Bailey Memorial Stadium; Clinton, SC	ESPN+	W 29–25	2,911
*Non-conference game; Rankings from STATS Poll released prior to the game; All times are in Eastern time

== Game summaries ==
=== at No. 11 Mercer ===
Presbyterian Blue Hose (0-0) vs. No. 11 Mercer Bears (0-0) – Game summary

Quarter	1	2	3	4	Total
Blue Hose	0	6	3	6	15
No. 11 Bears	7	0	3	0	10

at Five Star Stadium • Macon, GA

- Date: August 30
- Game time: 6:00 PM EDT
- TV announcers (ESPN+): Frank Malloy and Phil Cox
- Box Score

Game information

First Quarter

- 0:04 – MER – Adonis McDaniel 11 Yd pass from DJ Smith (Reice Griffith Kick). Mercer 0–7. Drive: 10 plays, 80 yards, 4:02

Second Quarter

- 9:37 - PRE – Nathan Levicki 29 Yd pass from Collin Hurst (Jett Jackson PAT failed). Mercer 6–7 Drive: 11 plays, 75 yards, 5:27

Third Quarter

- 8:53 – MER – Reice Griffith 22 Yd Field Goal. Mercer 6–10. Drive: 6 plays, 20 yards, 2:48
- 3:54 – PRE – Jett Jackson 29 Yd Field Goal. Mercer 9–10. Drive: 11 plays, 61 yards, 4:53.

Fourth Quarter

0:56 – PRE – Zach Switzer 16 Yd Run (Two-Point Pass Conversion Failed). Presbyterian 15–10. Drive: 13 plays, 80 yards, 5:39

Statistics	PRES	MER
First downs	20	16
Total yards	416	241
Rushing yards	113	87
Passing yards	303	154
Passing: Comp–Att–Int	7–55–1	5–41–1
Time of possession	35:50	24:10

Team	Category	Player	Statistics
Presbyterian	Passing	Collin Hurst	25/38, 303 yards, 1 INT, 1 TD
Presbyterian	Rushing	Zach Switzer	9 carries, 33 yards, 1 TD
Presbyterian	Receiving	Dominic Kibby	9 receptions, 114 yards
Mercer	Passing	DJ Smith	22/36, 154 yards, 1 INT, 1 TD
Mercer	Rushing	Micah Bell	4 carries, 32 yards
Mercer	Receiving	Brayden Smith	4 receptions, 56 yards

=== at Furman ===
Presbyterian Blue Hose (1-0) vs. Furman Paladins (1-0) – Game summary

Quarter	1	2	3	4	OT	Total
Blue Hose	7	7	7	10	8	39
Paladins	7	21	3	0	7	38

at Paladin Stadium • Greenville, SC

- Date: September 6
- Game time: 2:00 p.m. EDT
- Game weather: Sunny • Temperature: 85 °F (29 °C) • Wind: SW at 7 miles per hour (11 km/h)
- Game attendance: 7,897
- Referee: Jeff Page
- TV announcers (ESPN+): Dan Scott (play-by-play), David Cobb (analyst) and Tom Van Hoy (sideline)

Game information

First Quarter

- (11:22) FUR – Gavin Hall 13-yard run, Ian Williams kick (Drive: 8 plays, 52 yards, 3:31; Furman 7–0)
- (4:15) PC – Cincere Gill 13-yard pass from Collin Hurst, Jett Jackson kick (Drive: 5 plays, 80 yards, 2:04; Tied 7–7)

Second Quarter

- (13:21) FUR – Gavin Hall 5-yard run, Ian Williams kick (Drive: 12 plays, 75 yards, 5:54; Furman 14–7)
- (9:31) FUR – Ja'Keith Hamilton 22-yard pass from Trey Hedden, Ian Williams kick (Drive: 4 plays, 59 yards, 1:16; Furman 21–7)
- (5:01) FUR – Jayquan Smith 1-yard run, Ian Williams kick (Drive: 6 plays, 58 yards, 2:33; Furman 28–7)
- (1:51) PC – Nathan Levicki 17-yard pass from Collin Hurst, Jett Jackson kick (Drive: 2 plays, 41 yards, 0:32; Furman 28–14)

Third Quarter

- (9:43) FUR – Ian Williams 34-yard field goal (Drive: 4 plays, -5 yards, 2:20; Furman 31–14)
- (5:10) PC – Zach Switzer 3-yard pass from Collin Hurst, Jett Jackson kick (Drive: 11 plays, 75 yards, 4:33; Furman 31–21)

Fourth Quarter

- (6:25) PC – Jett Jackson 25-yard field goal (Drive: 8 plays, 47 yards, 2:30; Furman 31–24)
- (4:38) PC – BJ Atkins 12-yard pass from Collin Hurst, Jett Jackson kick (Drive: 1 play, 12 yards, 0:08; Tied 31–31)

Overtime

- FUR – Jayquan Smith 2-yard run, Ian Williams kick (Drive: 6 plays, 25 yards, 0:00; Furman 38–31)
- PC – Nathan Levicki 3-yard pass from Collin Hurst, Jett Jackson kick (Drive: 2 plays, 25 yards, 0:00; Presbyterian 39–38)

Statistics	PRES	FUR
First downs	23	21
Total yards	444	370
Rushing yards	169	107
Passing yards	275	263
Passing: Comp–Att–Int	26–41–3	29–40–2
Time of possession	28:56	31:04

Team	Category	Player	Statistics
Presbyterian	Passing	Collin Hurst	26/41, 275 yards, 5 TD, 3 INT
Presbyterian	Rushing	Zach Switzer	16 carries, 67 yards
Presbyterian	Receiving	Nathan Levicki	6 receptions, 60 yards, 2 TD
Furman	Passing	Trey Hedden	29/40, 263 yards, TD, 2 INT
Furman	Rushing	Gavin Hall	15 carries, 64 yards, 2 TD
Furman	Receiving	Evan James	8 receptions, 89 yards

=== Erskine (DII) ===
Erskine Flying Fleet (DII) (0-1) vs. Presbyterian Blue Hose (2-0) – Game summary

Quarter	1	2	3	4	Total
Flying Fleet (DII)	0	7	7	0	14
Blue Hose	14	21	7	0	42

at Bailey Memorial Stadium • Clinton, SC

- Date: September 13
- Game time: 7:00 PM EDT
- Game weather: Sunny • Temperature: 76 °F (24 °C) • Wind: NE at 4 miles per hour (6.4 km/h)
- Game attendance: 4,372
- Referee: Michael Farmer
- TV: ESPN+

Game information

First Quarter

- (7:17) PC – Nathan Levicki 1-yard run, Jett Jackson kick (Drive: 7 plays, 50 yards, 2:42; Presbyterian 7–0)
- (0:24) PC – Zach Switzer 1-yard run, Jett Jackson kick (Drive: 7 plays, 45 yards, 2:47; Presbyterian 14–0)

Second Quarter

- (10:58) ERS – Taylor Rhodes 12-yard pass from Ryan Killmer, Keegan Moran kick (Drive: 9 plays, 91 yards, 4:20; Presbyterian 14–7)
- (7:30) PC – Nathan Levicki 17-yard pass from Collin Hurst, Jett Jackson kick (Drive: 6 plays, 80 yards, 3:21; Presbyterian 21–7)
- (1:53) PC – Cincere Gill 41-yard pass from Collin Hurst, Jett Jackson kick (Drive: 4 plays, 91 yards, 1:37; Presbyterian 28–7)
- (0:35) PC – Cincere Gill 22-yard pass from Collin Hurst, Jett Jackson kick (Drive: 4 plays, 82 yards, 0:27; Presbyterian 35–7)

Third Quarter

- (10:00) ERS – Derek Simon Jr. 41-yard fumble recovery, Keegan Moran kick (Presbyterian 35–14)
- (5:06) PC – Justin Montgomery 1-yard run, Peter Lipscombe kick (Drive: 10 plays, 72 yards, 4:48; Presbyterian 42–14)

Fourth Quarter

No scoring plays

Statistics	ERS	PRES
First downs	10	28
Total yards	204	545
Rushing yards	72	188
Passing yards	132	357
Passing: Comp–Att–Int	11–19–1	18–29–0
Time of possession	22:47	37:13

Team	Category	Player	Statistics
Erskine	Passing	Ryan Killmer	11/17, 132 yards, TD, INT
Erskine	Rushing	Logan Coldren	7 carries, 36 yards
Erskine	Receiving	Rodshaun Dorsey	3 receptions, 58 yards
Presbyterian	Passing	Collin Hurst	16/22, 343 yards, 3 TD
Presbyterian	Rushing	Zach Switzer	11 carries, 75 yards, TD
Presbyterian	Receiving	Cincere Gill	4 receptions, 129 yards, 2 TD

=== Bluefield (NAIA) ===
Bluefield Rams (NAIA) (1-1) vs. Presbyterian Blue Hose (3-0) – Game summary

Quarter	1	2	3	4	Total
Rams (NAIA)	0	3	0	0	3
Blue Hose	27	30	16	3	76

at Bailey Memorial Stadium • Clinton, SC

- Date: September 20
- Game time: 1:00 PM EDT
- Game weather: Sunny • Temperature: 82 °F (28 °C) • Wind: N at 2 miles per hour (3.2 km/h)
- Game attendance: 3,930
- Referee: Brian Kovach
- TV: ESPN+

Game information

First Quarter

- (13:30) PC – Cincere Gill 51-yard pass from Collin Hurst (Drive: 4 plays, 66 yards, 1:24; Presbyterian 6–0)
- (11:06) PC – Collin Hurst 26-yard run, Peter Lipscombe kick (Drive: 3 plays, 63 yards, 0:58; Presbyterian 13–0)
- (4:36) PC – Zach Switzer 19-yard run, Peter Lipscombe kick (Drive: 6 plays, 80 yards, 2:23; Presbyterian 20–0)
- (3:32) PC – Deverious Abercrombie 33-yard pass from Collin Hurst, Peter Lipscombe kick (Drive: 1 play, 33 yards, 0:07; Presbyterian 27–0)

Second Quarter

- (13:28) PC – Peter Lipscombe 24-yard field goal (Drive: 9 plays, 32 yards, 2:50; Presbyterian 30–0)
- (11:25) PC – Justin Montgomery 61-yard run (Drive: 1 play, 61 yards, 0:15; Presbyterian 36–0)
- (8:09) BLU – Isaiah Bandy 26-yard field goal (Drive: 8 plays, 65 yards, 3:09; Presbyterian 36–3)
- (7:13) PC – Zach Switzer 21-yard pass from Collin Hurst, Peter Lipscombe kick (Drive: 3 plays, 67 yards, 0:51; Presbyterian 43–3)
- (2:08) PC – Chris Vickerson 34-yard pass from Collin Hurst, Peter Lipscombe kick (Drive: 4 plays, 45 yards, 1:42; Presbyterian 50–3)
- (0:30) PC – Zach Switzer 3-yard run, Peter Lipscombe kick (Drive: 6 plays, 65 yards, 1:08; Presbyterian 57–3)

Third Quarter

- (10:41) PC – Jalen Patrick 22-yard pass from Ty Englehart, Peter Lipscombe kick (Drive: 3 plays, 24 yards, 1:08; Presbyterian 64–3)
- (10:35) PC – 0-yard safety (Presbyterian 66–3)
- (3:16) PC – Garrison Curry 4-yard pass from Ty Englehart, Peter Lipscombe kick (Drive: 6 plays, 37 yards, 1:59; Presbyterian 73–3)

Fourth Quarter

- (11:55) PC – Peter Lipscombe 20-yard field goal (Drive: 6 plays, 27 yards, 5:25; Presbyterian 76–3)

Statistics	BLU	PRES
First downs	8	29
Total yards	142	571
Rushing yards	57	249
Passing yards	85	322
Passing: Comp–Att–Int	14–28–2	19–25–0
Time of possession	30:51	29:09

Team	Category	Player	Statistics
Bluefield	Passing	Ethan Cash	13/26, 75 yards, 2 INT
Bluefield	Rushing	Rayjuan Traynham	3 carries, 55 yards
Bluefield	Receiving	Marlin Haywood	5 receptions, 30 yards
Presbyterian	Passing	Collin Hurst	15/18, 289 yards, 4 TD
Presbyterian	Rushing	Zach Switzer	11 carries, 83 yards, 2 TD
Presbyterian	Receiving	Zach Switzer	3 receptions, 68 yards, TD

=== Morehead State ===
Morehead State Eagles (2-2) vs. No. 25 Presbyterian Blue Hose (4-0) – Game summary

Quarter	1	2	3	4	Total
Eagles	0	0	0	0	0
No. 25 Blue Hose	14	21	6	0	41

at Bailey Memorial Stadium • Clinton, SC

- Date: September 27
- Game time: 1:00 PM EDT
- Game weather: Rain • Temperature: 73 °F (23 °C) • Wind: NW at 1 mile per hour (1.6 km/h)
- Game attendance: 3,661
- Referee: Brian Hilpisch
- TV: ESPN+

Game information

First Quarter

- (12:33) PC – Zach Switzer 1-yard pass from Collin Hurst, Jett Jackson kick (Drive: 5 plays, 40 yards, 2:23; Presbyterian 7–0)
- (11:37) PC – Dominic Kibby 10-yard pass from Collin Hurst, Jett Jackson kick (Drive: 2 plays, 31 yards, 0:41; Presbyterian 14–0)

Second Quarter

- (14:27) PC – Justin Montgomery 14-yard run, Jett Jackson kick (Drive: 6 plays, 59 yards, 2:38; Presbyterian 21–0)
- (9:32) PC – Zach Switzer 66-yard run, Jett Jackson kick (Drive: 1 play, 66 yards, 0:12; Presbyterian 28–0)
- (1:48) PC – Zach Switzer 79-yard run, Jett Jackson kick (Drive: 2 plays, 77 yards, 0:56; Presbyterian 35–0)

Third Quarter

- (7:00) PC – Collin Hurst 12-yard run (Drive: 5 plays, 47 yards, 2:10; Presbyterian 41–0)

Fourth Quarter

No scoring plays

Statistics	MORE	PRES
First downs	18	20
Total yards	277	445
Rushing yards	123	303
Passing yards	154	142
Passing: Comp–Att–Int	15–35–3	12–19–0
Time of possession	36:25	23:35

Team	Category	Player	Statistics
Morehead State	Passing	Carter Cravens	10/24, 120 yards, 2 INT
Morehead State	Rushing	Bryce Patterson	3 carries, 37 yards
Morehead State	Receiving	Anthony Ice	3 receptions, 68 yards
Presbyterian	Passing	Collin Hurst	11/17, 137 yards, 2 TD
Presbyterian	Rushing	Zach Switzer	6 carries, 158 yards, 2 TD
Presbyterian	Receiving	Cincere Gill	4 receptions, 62 yards

=== at Butler ===
No. 24 Presbyterian Blue Hose (5-0) vs. Butler Bulldogs (4-2) – Game summary

Quarter	1	2	3	4	Total
No. 24 Blue Hose	15	3	0	13	31
Bulldogs	7	9	3	6	25

at Bud and Jackie Sellick Bowl • Indianapolis, IN

- Date: October 11
- Game time: 1:00 PM EDT
- Game weather: Sunny • Temperature: 71 °F (22 °C)
- Game attendance: 3,682
- Referee: Grant Henderson
- TV: FloCollege
- Box Score

Game information

First Quarter

- (13:22) PRES – Cincere Gill 14-yard pass from Collin Hurst, Justin Montgomery rush (Drive: 4 plays, 75 yards, 1:38; Presbyterian 8–0)
- (2:45) BUT – Reagan Andrew 9-yard run, Ryan Short kick (Drive: 15 plays, 89 yards, 7:54; Presbyterian 8–7)
- (0:00) PRES – Zach Switzer 8-yard run, Dixon Musgrove kick (Drive: 7 plays, 75 yards, 2:45; Presbyterian 15–7)

Second Quarter

- (7:39) BUT – Ryan Short 33-yard field goal (Drive: 13 plays, 60 yards, 7:21; Presbyterian 15–10)
- (3:08) PRES – Jett Jackson 38-yard field goal (Drive: 10 plays, 54 yards, 4:31; Presbyterian 18–10)
- (0:39) BUT – Griffin Caldwell 14-yard run, Ryan short kick blocked (Drive: 2 plays, 20 yards, 0:26; Presbyterian 18–16)

Third Quarter

- (5:17) BUT – Ryan Short 25-yard field goal (Drive: 18 plays, 67 yards, 9:43; Butler 19–18)

Fourth Quarter

- (11:11) BUT – Ryan Short 37-yard field goal (Drive: 10 plays, 57 yards, 4:41; Butler 22–18)
- (11:00) PRES – Nathan Levicki 75-yard pass from Collin Hurst, Dixon Musgrove kick failed (Drive: 1 play, 75 yards, 0:11; Presbyterian 24–22)
- (1:00) PRES – Zach Switzer 3-yard run, Dixon Musgrove kick (Drive: 11 plays, 75 yards, 4:35; Presbyterian 31–22)
- (0:10) BUT – Ryan Short 41-yard field goal (Drive: 9 plays, 45 yards, 0:45; Presbyterian 31–25)

Statistics	PRES	BUT
First downs	16	26
Total yards	385	388
Rushing yards	210	193
Passing yards	175	195
Passing: Comp–Att–Int	12–16–0	20–34–0
Time of possession	19:37	40:23

Team	Category	Player	Statistics
Presbyterian	Passing	Collin Hurst	12/16, 175 yards, 2 TD
Presbyterian	Rushing	Justin Montgomery	10 carries, 134 yards
Presbyterian	Receiving	Nathan Levicki	2 receptions, 82 yards, TD
Butler	Passing	Reagan Andrew	20/33, 195 yards
Butler	Rushing	Reagan Andrew	31 carries, 115 yards, TD
Butler	Receiving	Nick Munson	5 receptions, 59 yards

=== Stetson ===
Stetson Hatters (3-4) vs. No. 21 Presbyterian Blue Hose (6-0) – Game summary

Quarter	1	2	3	4	Total
Hatters	0	0	0	7	7
No. 21 Blue Hose	7	14	14	7	42

at Bailey Memorial Stadium • Clinton, SC

- Date: October 18
- Game time: 1:00 PM EDT

Statistics	STET	PRES
First downs	14	28
Total yards	283	440
Rushing yards	158	147
Passing yards	125	293
Passing: Comp–Att–Int	14–29–1	23–31–1
Time of possession	31:14	28:46

Team	Category	Player	Statistics
Stetson	Passing	Gunner Chenier	8/14, 90 yards, TD, INT
Stetson	Rushing	Cayden Betts	10 carries, 66 yards, TD
Stetson	Receiving	Dylan Redmon	2 receptions, 44 yards
Presbyterian	Passing	Collin Hurst	19/27, 236 yards, TD, INT
Presbyterian	Rushing	Justin Montgomery	8 carries, 54 yards
Presbyterian	Receiving	Cincere Gill	6 receptions, 107 yards, TD

=== at Dayton ===
No. 19 Presbyterian Blue Hose (7-0) vs. Dayton Flyers (5-2) – Game summary

Quarter	1	2	3	4	Total
No. 19 Blue Hose	13	0	6	0	19
Flyers	7	21	7	0	35

at Welcome Stadium • Dayton, OH

- Date: October 25
- Game time: 12:00 PM EDT
- TV: YouTube

Statistics	PRES	DAY
First downs		
Total yards		
Rushing yards		
Passing yards		
Passing: Comp–Att–Int		
Time of possession		

Team	Category	Player	Statistics
Presbyterian	Passing		
Presbyterian	Rushing		
Presbyterian	Receiving		
Dayton	Passing		
Dayton	Rushing		
Dayton	Receiving		

=== Valparaiso ===
Valparaiso Beacons (1-7) vs. No. 25 Presbyterian Blue Hose (7-1) – Game summary

Quarter	1	2	3	4	Total
Beacons	-	-	-	-	0
No. 25 Blue Hose	-	-	-	-	0

at Bailey Memorial Stadium • Clinton, SC

- Date: November 1
- Game time: 1:00 PM EDT

Statistics	VAL	PRES
First downs		
Total yards		
Rushing yards		
Passing yards		
Passing: Comp–Att–Int		
Time of possession		

Team	Category	Player	Statistics
Valparaiso	Passing		
Valparaiso	Rushing		
Valparaiso	Receiving		
Presbyterian	Passing		
Presbyterian	Rushing		
Presbyterian	Receiving		

=== at Davidson ===
No. 25 Presbyterian Blue Hose (8-1) vs. Davidson Wildcats (1-8) – Game summary

Quarter	1	2	3	4	Total
No. 25 Blue Hose	-	-	-	-	0
Wildcats	-	-	-	-	0

at Davidson College Stadium • Davidson, NC

- Date: November 8
- Game time: 5:00 PM EST

Statistics	PRES	DAV
First downs		
Total yards		
Rushing yards		
Passing yards		
Passing: Comp–Att–Int		
Time of possession		

Team	Category	Player	Statistics
Presbyterian	Passing		
Presbyterian	Rushing		
Presbyterian	Receiving		
Davidson	Passing		
Davidson	Rushing		
Davidson	Receiving		

=== at St. Thomas (MN) ===
Presbyterian Blue Hose (0-0) vs. St. Thomas Tommies (0-0) – Game summary

Quarter	1	2	3	4	Total
Blue Hose	-	-	-	-	0
Tommies	-	-	-	-	0

at O'Shaughnessy Stadium • Saint Paul, MN

- Date: November 15
- Game time: 1:00 PM CST

Statistics	PRES	STMN
First downs		
Total yards		
Rushing yards		
Passing yards		
Passing: Comp–Att–Int		
Time of possession		

Team	Category	Player	Statistics
Presbyterian	Passing		
Presbyterian	Rushing		
Presbyterian	Receiving		
St. Thomas (MN)	Passing		
St. Thomas (MN)	Rushing		
St. Thomas (MN)	Receiving		

=== Marist ===
Marist Red Foxes (0-0) vs. Presbyterian Blue Hose (0-0) – Game summary

Quarter	1	2	3	4	Total
Red Foxes	-	-	-	-	0
Blue Hose	-	-	-	-	0

at Bailey Memorial Stadium • Clinton, SC

- Date: November 22
- Game time: 1:00 PM EST

Statistics	MRST	PRES
First downs		
Total yards		
Rushing yards		
Passing yards		
Passing: Comp–Att–Int		
Time of possession		

Team	Category	Player	Statistics
Marist	Passing		
Marist	Rushing		
Marist	Receiving		
Presbyterian	Passing		
Presbyterian	Rushing		
Presbyterian	Receiving		
