= 2025 Stetson Hatters football team =

American college football season

2025 Stetson Hatters football
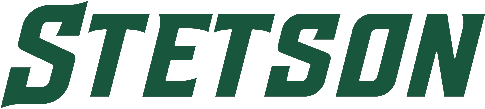
- Conference: Pioneer Football League
- Record: 3–9 (2–6 PFL)
- Head coach: Michael Jasper (1st season)
- Offensive coordinator: Jarod Dodson (1st season)
- Defensive coordinator: Dustin Kincaid (1st season)
- Home stadium: Spec Martin Stadium

2025 Pioneer Football League standings
	Conf.			Overall
Team	W		L	W		L
Drake $^	7	–	1	8	–	4
Presbyterian	6	–	2	10	–	2
San Diego	6	–	2	8	–	4
St. Thomas	5	–	3	7	–	5
Dayton	5	–	3	7	–	4
Morehead State	4	–	4	6	–	6
Butler	4	–	4	6	–	6
Marist	3	–	5	5	–	7
Stetson	2	–	6	3	–	9
Davidson	1	–	7	2	–	10
Valparaiso	1	–	7	2	–	10
$ – Conference champion; ^ – FCS playoff participant; Rankings from STATS Poll

The 2025 Stetson Hatters football team represented Stetson University as a member of the Pioneer Football League (PFL) during the 2025 NCAA Division I FCS football season. They were led by first-year head coach Michael Jasper. The Hatters played home games at Spec Martin Stadium in DeLand, Florida.

Head coach Brian Young resigned after a 2–9 campaign and an overall record of 13–30 in four seasons. Shortly after, Michael Jasper, head coach for Bethel (TN) since 2019, was announced as his successor.

Joining Jasper were several new coaches, including Jarod Dodson as associate head coach, offensive coordinator, and quarterbacks coach and Herman Smith as defensive line coach.

== Schedule ==
Date	Time	Opponent	Site	TV	Result	Attendance
August 30	6:00 p.m.	Webber International*	Spec Martin Stadium; DeLand, FL	ESPN+	L 21–31	1,975
September 6	6:00 p.m.	Warner*	Spec Martin Stadium; DeLand, FL	ESPN+	W 59–13	1,617
September 13	6:00 p.m.	at Chattanooga*	Finley Stadium; Chattanooga, TN	ESPN+	L 0–63	7,144
September 20	1:00 p.m.	Harvard*	Spec Martin Stadium; DeLand, FL	ESPN+	L 7–59	1,400
September 27	12:00 p.m.	at Dayton	Welcome Stadium; Dayton, OH	YouTube	L 14–48	5,262
October 4	1:00 p.m.	Davidson	Spec Martin Stadium; DeLand, FL	ESPN+	W 35–32	1,250
October 11	1:00 p.m.	Morehead State	Spec Martin Stadium; DeLand, FL	ESPN+	W 21–14	1,490
October 18	1:00 p.m.	at No. 21 Presbyterian	Bailey Memorial Stadium; Clinton, SC	ESPN+	L 7–42	7,435
October 25	1:00 p.m.	St. Thomas (MN)^{†}	Spec Martin Stadium; DeLand, FL	ESPN+	L 10–52	2,024
November 8	1:00 p.m.	at Marist	Tenney Stadium at Leonidoff Field; Poughkeepsie, NY	ESPN+	L 13–41	983
November 15	1:00 p.m.	at Valparaiso	Brown Field; Valparaiso, IN	ESPN+	L 31–32 ^{OT}	1,356
November 22	1:00 p.m.	San Diego	Spec Martin Stadium; DeLand, FL	ESPN+	L 8–42	1,721
*Non-conference game; ^{†}Homecoming; Rankings from Coaches' Poll released prior to the game; All times are in Eastern time

== Game summaries ==
=== Webber International (NAIA) ===
Webber International Warriors (NAIA) (0-0) vs. Stetson Hatters (0-0) – Game summary

Quarter	1	2	3	4	Total
Warriors (NAIA)	0	17	7	7	31
Hatters	7	0	7	7	21

at Spec Martin Stadium • DeLand, FL

- Date: August 30
- Game time: 6:00 p.m. EDT
- Game weather: Rain • Temperature: 80 °F (27 °C)
- Game attendance: 1,975
- Referee: Bradley Eiras
- TV announcers (ESPN+): Tom James

Game information

First Quarter

- (13:36) STET – Cayden Betts 6-yard run, Daniel Holbrook kick (Drive: 3 plays, 63 yards, 1:24; Stetson 7–0)

Second Quarter

- (14:05) WEBB – Rourke Davis 38-yard field goal (Drive: 12 plays, 75 yards, 6:27; Stetson 7–3)
- (8:28) WEBB – Caden Morrell 34-yard fumble recovery, Rourke Davis kick (Webber International 10–7)
- (0:07) WEBB – Dantay Diorio 3-yard pass from Trent Grotjan, Rourke Davis kick (Drive: 9 plays, 69 yards, 1:21; Webber International 17–7)

Third Quarter

- (7:11) STET – Anthony Benzija 20-yard pass from Kael Alexander, Daniel Holbrook kick (Drive: 11 plays, 86 yards, 4:15; Webber International 17–14)
- (2:13) WEBB – Johnny Lewis Jr. 14-yard run, Rourke Davis kick (Drive: 1 play, 14 yards, 0:10; Webber International 24–14)

Fourth Quarter

- (13:15) STET – Troy Flowers 4-yard run, Daniel Holbrook kick (Drive: 10 plays, 65 yards, 3:52; Webber International 24–21)
- (10:10) WEBB – Anthony Fuller 21-yard interception, Rourke Davis kick (Webber International 31–21)

Statistics	WEBB	STET
First downs	15	20
Total yards	190	403
Rushing yards	118	141
Passing yards	72	262
Passing: Comp–Att–Int	9–19–0	22–33–1
Time of possession	27:32	32:28

Team	Category	Player	Statistics
Webber International	Passing	Trent Grotjan	9/19, 72 yards, TD
Webber International	Rushing	Trent Grotjan	13 carries, 42 yards
Webber International	Receiving	Cory Conklin	2 receptions, 31 yards
Stetson	Passing	Kael Alexandr	16/25, 164 yards, TD, INT
Stetson	Rushing	Trey Clark	14 carries, 74 yards
Stetson	Receiving	Wyatt Rogers	9 receptions, 65 yards

=== Warner (NAIA) ===
Warner Royals (NAIA) (0-0) vs. Stetson Hatters (0-1) – Game summary

Quarter	1	2	3	4	Total
Royals (NAIA)	0	3	0	10	13
Hatters	24	14	14	7	59

at Spec Martin Stadium • DeLand, FL

- Date: September 6
- Game time: 6:00 p.m. EDT
- Game weather: Cloudy • Temperature: 85 °F (29 °C) • Wind: NE at 8 miles per hour (13 km/h)
- Game attendance: 1,617
- Referee: Lance Mathis
- TV: ESPN+

Game information

First Quarter

- (13:38) STET – Wyatt Rogers 53-yard pass from Kael Alexander, Daniel Holbrook kick (Drive: 3 plays, 56 yards, 1:22; Stetson 7–0)
- (10:04) STET – Daniel Holbrook 35-yard field goal (Drive: 4 plays, 3 yards, 1:22; Stetson 10–0)
- (6:02) STET – Trey Clark 2-yard run, Daniel Holbrook kick (Drive: 7 plays, 54 yards, 2:38; Stetson 17–0)
- (1:24) STET – Marvin Duffey Jr. 5-yard run, Daniel Holbrook kick (Drive: 7 plays, 30 yards, 3:14; Stetson 24–0)

Second Quarter

- (10:52) STET – Trey Clark 10-yard run, Daniel Holbrook kick (Drive: 5 plays, 77 yards, 2:14; Stetson 31–0)
- (0:33) STET – Marvin Duffey Jr. 9-yard run, Daniel Holbrook kick (Drive: 5 plays, 51 yards, 1:17; Stetson 38–0)
- (0:00) WAR – Ethan Silva 42-yard field goal (Drive: 5 plays, 43 yards, 0:33; Stetson 38–3)

Third Quarter

- (13:19) STET – Michael Dempsey 46-yard pass from Kael Alexander, Daniel Holbrook kick (Drive: 2 plays, 33 yards, 0:17; Stetson 45–3)
- (9:12) STET – Dylan Redmon 67-yard pass from Kael Alexander, Daniel Holbrook kick (Drive: 3 plays, 78 yards, 1:21; Stetson 52–3)

Fourth Quarter

- (14:10) WAR – Ethan Silva 33-yard field goal (Drive: 9 plays, 57 yards, 3:47; Stetson 52–6)
- (5:58) STET – Troy Flowers 8-yard run, Paul Desousa kick (Drive: 12 plays, 90 yards, 7:56; Stetson 59–6)
- (0:28) WAR – Michael Ryan 10-yard run, Ethan Silva kick (Drive: 16 plays, 76 yards, 5:23; Stetson 59–13)

Statistics	WAR	STET
First downs	20	21
Total yards	295	528
Rushing yards	69	171
Passing yards	226	357
Passing: Comp–Att–Int	20–42–2	13–19–0
Time of possession	31:49	28:11

Team	Category	Player	Statistics
Warner	Passing	Jeremiah Johnson	12/25, 94 yards
Warner	Rushing	Michael Ryan	8 carries, 29 yards, TD
Warner	Receiving	Hazia Phillips	2 receptions, 50 yards
Stetson	Passing	Kael Alexander	11/15, 336 yards, 3 TD
Stetson	Rushing	Troy Flowers	10 carries, 44 yards, TD
Stetson	Receiving	Wyatt Rogers	5 receptions, 130 yards, TD

=== at Chattanooga ===
Stetson Hatters (1-1) vs. Chattanooga Mocs (0-2) – Game summary

Quarter	1	2	3	4	Total
Hatters	-	-	-	-	0
Mocs	-	-	-	-	0

at Finley Stadium • Chattanooga, TN

- Date: September 13
- Game time: 6:00 p.m. EDT
- TV announcers (ESPN+): Chris Goforth (play-by-play), Chris Barnett (analyst) and Mackenzie Johnson (sideline)

Statistics	STET	UTC
First downs		
Total yards		
Rushing yards		
Passing yards		
Passing: Comp–Att–Int		
Time of possession		

Team	Category	Player	Statistics
Stetson	Passing		
Stetson	Rushing		
Stetson	Receiving		
Chattanooga	Passing		
Chattanooga	Rushing		
Chattanooga	Receiving		

=== Harvard ===
Harvard Crimson (0-0) vs. Stetson Hatters (1-2) – Game summary

Quarter	1	2	3	4	Total
Crimson	-	-	-	-	0
Hatters	-	-	-	-	0

at Spec Martin Stadium • DeLand, FL

- Date: September 20
- Game time: 1:00 p.m. EDT
- TV announcers (ESPN+): Tom James (play-by-play) and Davion Belk (analyst)

Statistics	HARV	STET
First downs		
Total yards		
Rushing yards		
Passing yards		
Passing: Comp–Att–Int		
Time of possession		

Team	Category	Player	Statistics
Harvard	Passing		
Harvard	Rushing		
Harvard	Receiving		
Stetson	Passing		
Stetson	Rushing		
Stetson	Receiving		

=== at Dayton ===
Stetson Hatters (1-3) vs. Dayton Flyers (2-1) – Game summary

Quarter	1	2	3	4	Total
Hatters	7	7	0	0	14
Flyers	21	21	6	0	48

at Welcome Stadium • Dayton, OH

- Date: September 27
- Game time: 12:00 PM EDT
- Game weather: Sunny • Temperature: 76 °F (24 °C) • Wind: N at 1 mile per hour (1.6 km/h)
- Game attendance: 5,262
- Referee: David Hergert
- TV: YouTube

Game information

First Quarter

- (12:43) DAY – Donovan Weatherly 50-yard pass from Bryce Schondelmyer, Robby Smart kick (Drive: 5 plays, 64 yards, 2:11; Dayton 7–0)
- (9:43) STET – Dylan Redmon 27-yard pass from Kael Alexander, Daniel Holbrook kick (Drive: 6 plays, 68 yards, 2:54; Tied 7–7)
- (7:26) DAY – Michael Mussari 54-yard pass from Bryce Schondelmyer, Robby Smart kick (Drive: 4 plays, 66 yards, 2:10; Dayton 14–7)
- (1:44) DAY – Michael Mussari 21-yard pass from Bryce Schondelmyer, Robby Smart kick (Drive: 8 plays, 63 yards, 4:44; Dayton 21–7)

Second Quarter

- (8:25) DAY – Gavin Lochow 7-yard pass from Bryce Schondelmyer, Robby Smart kick (Drive: 10 plays, 74 yards, 6:08; Dayton 28–7)
- (6:35) DAY – Dominic Vrbancic 7-yard pass from Bryce Schondelmyer, Robby Smart kick (Drive: 1 play, 7 yards, 0:05; Dayton 35–7)
- (2:02) STET – Dylan Redmon 11-yard pass from Kael Alexander, Daniel Holbrook kick (Drive: 11 plays, 75 yards, 4:33; Dayton 35–14)
- (0:00) DAY – Vincent Firenze 99-yard interception, Robby Smart kick (Dayton 42–14)

Third Quarter

- (6:26) DAY – Luke Hansen 7-yard run (Drive: 12 plays, 85 yards, 6:54; Dayton 48–14)

Fourth Quarter

No scoring plays

Statistics	STET	DAY
First downs	18	22
Total yards	299	461
Rushing yards	101	110
Passing yards	198	351
Passing: Comp–Att–Int	18–32–2	22–28–0
Time of possession	26:45	33:15

Team	Category	Player	Statistics
Stetson	Passing	Kael Alexander	15/29, 190 yards, 2 TD, 2 INT
Stetson	Rushing	Cayden Betts	10 carries, 35 yards
Stetson	Receiving	Dylan Redmon	3 receptions, 58 yards, 2 TD
Dayton	Passing	Bryce Schondelmyer	19/23, 333 yards, 5 TD
Dayton	Rushing	Levi Moell	7 carries, 46 yards
Dayton	Receiving	Michael Mussari	8 receptions, 169 yards, 2 TD

=== Davidson ===
Davidson Wildcats (1-3) vs. Stetson Hatters (1-4) – Game summary

Quarter	1	2	3	4	Total
Wildcats	3	14	0	15	32
Hatters	7	14	0	14	35

at Spec Martin Stadium • DeLand, FL

- Date: October 4
- Game time: 1:00 PM EDT
- TV announcers (ESPN+): Whit Watson (play-by-play)

Statistics	DAV	STET
First downs		
Total yards		
Rushing yards		
Passing yards		
Passing: Comp–Att–Int		
Time of possession		

Team	Category	Player	Statistics
Davidson	Passing		
Davidson	Rushing		
Davidson	Receiving		
Stetson	Passing		
Stetson	Rushing		
Stetson	Receiving		

=== Morehead State ===
Morehead State Eagles (2-4) vs. Stetson Hatters (2-4) – Game summary

Quarter	1	2	3	4	Total
Eagles	0	0	0	14	14
Hatters	7	7	0	7	21

at Spec Martin Stadium • DeLand, FL

- Date: October 11
- Game time: 1:00 PM EDT
- TV: ESPN+

Statistics	MORE	STET
First downs		
Total yards		
Rushing yards		
Passing yards		
Passing: Comp–Att–Int		
Time of possession		

Team	Category	Player	Statistics
Morehead State	Passing		
Morehead State	Rushing		
Morehead State	Receiving		
Stetson	Passing		
Stetson	Rushing		
Stetson	Receiving		

=== at No. 21 Presbyterian ===
Stetson Hatters (3-4) vs. No. 21 Presbyterian Blue Hose (6-0) – Game summary

Quarter	1	2	3	4	Total
Hatters	-	-	-	-	0
No. 21 Blue Hose	-	-	-	-	0

at Bailey Memorial Stadium • Clinton, SC

- Date: October 18

Statistics	STET	PRES
First downs		
Total yards		
Rushing yards		
Passing yards		
Passing: Comp–Att–Int		
Time of possession		

Team	Category	Player	Statistics
Stetson	Passing		
Stetson	Rushing		
Stetson	Receiving		
Presbyterian	Passing		
Presbyterian	Rushing		
Presbyterian	Receiving		

=== St. Thomas (MN) ===
St. Thomas Tommies (4-3) vs. Stetson Hatters (3-5) – Game summary

Quarter	1	2	3	4	Total
Tommies	-	-	-	-	0
Hatters	-	-	-	-	0

at Spec Martin Stadium • DeLand, FL

- Date: October 25
- Game time: 1:00 PM EDT

Statistics	STMN	STET
First downs		
Total yards		
Rushing yards		
Passing yards		
Passing: Comp–Att–Int		
Time of possession		

Team	Category	Player	Statistics
St. Thomas (MN)	Passing		
St. Thomas (MN)	Rushing		
St. Thomas (MN)	Receiving		
Stetson	Passing		
Stetson	Rushing		
Stetson	Receiving		

=== at Marist ===
Stetson Hatters (3-6) vs. Marist Red Foxes (3-6) – Game summary

Quarter	1	2	3	4	Total
Hatters	0	7	0	6	13
Red Foxes	10	28	3	0	41

at Leonidoff Field • Poughkeepsie, NY

- Date: November 8
- Game time: 1:00 PM EST
- Game attendance: 983
- TV: ESPN+

Game information

First Quarter

- (2:24) MRST – Samer Layous 23-yard field goal (Drive: 9 plays, 80 yards, 3:59; Marist 3–0)
- (1:13) MRST – Jace Williamson 45 Yd Interception Return (Samer Layous Kick) (Drive: 3 plays, 2 yards, 1:00; Marist 10–0)

Second Quarter

- (13:58) MRST – Connor Hulstein 78 Yd pass from Sonny Mannino (Samer Layous Kick) (Drive: 2 plays, 79 yards, 0:50; Marist 17–0)
- (8:11) MRST – Sonny Mannino 49 Yd Run (Samer Layous Kick) (Drive: 3 plays, 43 yards, 1:12; Marist 24–0)
- (7:12) MRST – Lance Martinez 36 Yd pass from Sonny Mannino (Samer Layous Kick) (Drive: 1 play, 36 yards, 0:07; Marist 31–0)
- (1:58) MRST – Sonny Mannino 3 Yd run (Samer Layous Kick) (Drive: 5 plays, 35 yards, 2:46; Marist 38–0)
- (0:02) STET – Beau Bankston 7 Yd pass from Kael Alexander (Daniel Holbrook Kick) (Drive: 11 plays, 61 yards, 1:47; Marist 38–7)

Third Quarter

- (10:59) MRST − Samer Layous 46-yard field goal (Drive: 7 plays, 36 yards, 3:56; Marist 41−7)

Fourth Quarter

(0:48) STET − Cayden Betts 2 Yd run (Daniel Holbrook PAT failed) (Drive: 14 plays, 80 yards, 7:35; Marist 41−13)

Statistics	STET	MRST
First downs	15	17
Total yards	276	393
Rushing yards	150	206
Passing yards	126	187
Passing: Comp–Att–Int	12–27–3	8–16–0
Time of possession	31:09	28:51

Team	Category	Player	Statistics
Stetson	Passing	Kael Alexander	7/19, 59 yards, 1 TD, 1 INT
Stetson	Rushing	Michael Dempsey	13 carries, 81 yards
Stetson	Receiving	Dylan Redmon	3 receptions, 48 yards
Marist	Passing	Sonny Mannino	8/15, 187 yards, 2 TDs
Marist	Rushing	Carter James	10 carries, 69 yards
Marist	Receiving	Connor Hulstein	2 receptions, 92 yards, 1 TD

=== at Valparaiso ===
Stetson Hatters (0-0) vs. Valparaiso Beacons (0-0) – Game summary

Quarter	1	2	3	4	Total
Hatters	-	-	-	-	0
Beacons	-	-	-	-	0

at Brown Field • Valparaiso, IN

- Date: November 15

Statistics	STET	VAL
First downs		
Total yards		
Rushing yards		
Passing yards		
Passing: Comp–Att–Int		
Time of possession		

Team	Category	Player	Statistics
Stetson	Passing		
Stetson	Rushing		
Stetson	Receiving		
Valparaiso	Passing		
Valparaiso	Rushing		
Valparaiso	Receiving		

=== San Diego ===
San Diego Toreros (0-0) vs. Stetson Hatters (0-0) – Game summary

Quarter	1	2	3	4	Total
Toreros	-	-	-	-	0
Hatters	-	-	-	-	0

at Spec Martin Stadium • DeLand, FL

- Date: November 22
- Game time: 4:00 PM EST

Statistics	USD	STET
First downs		
Total yards		
Rushing yards		
Passing yards		
Passing: Comp–Att–Int		
Time of possession		

Team	Category	Player	Statistics
San Diego	Passing		
San Diego	Rushing		
San Diego	Receiving		
Stetson	Passing		
Stetson	Rushing		
Stetson	Receiving		
