= 2025 Dayton Flyers football team =

American college football season

2025 Dayton Flyers football
- Conference: Pioneer Football League
- Record: 7–4 (5–3 PFL)
- Head coach: Trevor Andrews (3rd season)
- Offensive coordinator: Greg Whalen (3rd season)
- Defensive coordinator: John Bowles (3rd season)
- Home stadium: Welcome Stadium

2025 Pioneer Football League standings
	Conf.			Overall
Team	W		L	W		L
Drake $^	7	–	1	8	–	4
Presbyterian	6	–	2	10	–	2
San Diego	6	–	2	8	–	4
St. Thomas (MN)	5	–	3	7	–	5
Dayton	5	–	3	7	–	4
Morehead State	4	–	4	6	–	6
Butler	4	–	4	6	–	6
Marist	3	–	5	5	–	7
Stetson	2	–	6	3	–	9
Davidson	1	–	7	2	–	10
Valparaiso	1	–	7	2	–	10
$ – Conference champion; ^ – FCS playoff participant; Rankings from STATS Poll

The 2025 Dayton Flyers football team represented the University of Dayton as a member of the Pioneer Football League (PFL) during the 2025 NCAA Division I FCS football season. The Flyers were led by third-year head coach Trevor Andrews and played home games at Welcome Stadium located in Dayton, Ohio.

== Schedule ==
Date	Time	Opponent	Site	TV	Result	Attendance
August 28	7:00 pm	at Eastern Illinois*	O'Brien Field; Charleston, IL	ESPN+	L 14–24	6,775
September 6	12:00 pm	Thomas More*	Welcome Stadium; Dayton, OH	YouTube	W 38–0	3,185
September 20	2:00 pm	at Robert Morris*	Joe Walton Stadium; Moon Township, PA	NEC Front Row	W 17–14	2,389
September 27	12:00 pm	Stetson	Welcome Stadium; Dayton, OH	YouTube	W 48–14	5,262
October 4	1:00 pm	at Morehead State	Jayne Stadium; Morehead, KY	ESPN+	W 35–28	5,028
October 11	2:00 pm	at Valparaiso	Brown Field; Valparaiso, IN	ESPN+	W 41–10	1,405
October 18	12:00 pm	Butler	Welcome Stadium; Dayton, OH	YouTube	L 17–23	3,423
October 25	12:00 pm	No. 19 Presbyterian	Welcome Stadium; Dayton, OH	YouTube	W 35–19	2,687
November 1	4:00 pm	at San Diego	Torero Stadium; San Diego, CA	ESPN+	L 13–31	1,063
November 15	12:00 pm	Drake	Welcome Stadium; Dayton, OH	YouTube	L 6–14	3,178
November 22	1:00 pm	at Davidson	Davidson College Stadium; Davidson, NC	ESPN+	W 42–14	2,202
*Non-conference game; Rankings from STATS Poll released prior to the game; All times are in Eastern time

== Game summaries ==
=== at Eastern Illinois ===
Dayton Flyers (0-0) vs. Eastern Illinois Panthers (0-0) – Game summary

Quarter	1	2	3	4	Total
Flyers	7	0	0	7	14
Panthers	0	3	7	14	24

at O'Brien Field • Charleston, IL

- Date: August 28
- Game time: 6:00 PM CDT
- Game weather: Sunny, 80 °F (27 °C)
- Game attendance: 6.775
- Referee: Chris Brison
- TV announcers (ESPN+): Mike Bradd (play-by-play), Dave Kidwell (analyst) and Kaylee Unruh (sideline)

Game information

First quarter

- (9:55) DAY – Gavin Lochow 48 yard pass from Bryce Schondelmyer, Robby Smart kick (Drive: 6 plays, 70 yards, 3:02; DAY 7–0)

Second quarter

- (6:12) EIU – Drew Schiller 25 yard field goal (Drive: 11 plays, 62 yards, 5:24; DAY 7–3)

Third quarter

- (6:03) EIU – Cole LaCrue 11 yard run, Drew Schiller kick (Drive: 11 plays, 92 yards, 4:48; EIU 10–7)

Fourth quarter

- (10:26) EIU – Cole LaCrue 1 yard run, Drew Schiller kick (Drive: 4 plays, 52 yards, 1:43; EIU 17–7)
- (9:31) DAY – Michael Mussari 67 yard pass from Bryce Schondelmyer, Robby Smart kick (Drive: 2 plays, 76 yards, 0:49; EIU 17–14)
- (2:15) EIU – Cole LaCrue 6 yard run, Drew Schiller kick (Drive: 13 plays, 75 yards, 7:16; EIU 24–14)

Statistics	DAY	EIU
First downs	9	25
Total yards	292	465
Rushing yards	31	336
Passing yards	261	129
Passing: Comp–Att–Int	17–31–0	9–18–1
Time of possession	19:43	40:17

Team	Category	Player	Statistics
Dayton	Passing	Bryce Schondelmyer	17/31, 261 yards, 2 TD
Dayton	Rushing	Mason Hackett	8 carries, 24 yards
Dayton	Receiving	Gavin Lochow	6 receptions, 124 yards, 1 TD
Eastern Illinois	Passing	Cole LaCrue	9/17, 129 yards, 1 INT
Eastern Illinois	Rushing	Cole LaCrue	26 carries, 193 yards, 3 TD
Eastern Illinois	Receiving	DeAirious Smith	2 receptions, 58 yards

=== Thomas More (DII) ===
Thomas More Saints (DII) (0-1) vs. Dayton Flyers (0-1) – Game summary

Quarter	1	2	3	4	Total
Saints (DII)	0	0	0	0	0
Flyers	0	14	7	17	38

at Welcome Stadium • Dayton, OH

- Date: September 6
- Game time: 12:00 PM EDT
- Game weather: Sunny • Temperature: 66 °F (19 °C) • Wind: W
- Game attendance: 3,185
- Referee: Timothy Duffy

Game information

First Quarter

No scoring plays

Second Quarter

- (6:05) DAY – Gavin Lochow 3-yard pass from Bryce Schondelmyer, Robby Smart kick (Drive: 10 plays, 80 yards, 4:46; Dayton 7–0)
- (0:41) DAY – Gavin Lochow 9-yard pass from Bryce Schondelmyer, Robby Smart kick (Drive: 8 plays, 62 yards, 1:39; Dayton 14–0)

Third Quarter

- (10:15) DAY – Luke Hansen 2-yard run, Robby Smart kick (Drive: 3 plays, 11 yards, 1:18; Dayton 21–0)

Fourth Quarter

- (12:40) DAY – Luke Hansen 51-yard run, Robby Smart kick (Drive: 4 plays, 67 yards, 2:05; Dayton 28–0)
- (4:55) DAY – Robby Smart 37-yard field goal (Drive: 10 plays, 29 yards, 4:44; Dayton 31–0)
- (1:42) DAY – Michael Mussari 16-yard pass from Drew VanVleet, Robby Smart kick (Drive: 8 plays, 46 yards, 2:59; Dayton 38–0)

Statistics	THO	DAY
First downs	11	23
Total yards	200	371
Rushing yards	74	200
Passing yards	126	171
Passing: Comp–Att–Int	15–32–2	19–28–0
Time of possession	22:38	37:22

Team	Category	Player	Statistics
Thomas More	Passing	Griffin Scalf	15/32, 126 yards, 2 INT
Thomas More	Rushing	Eli White	14 carries, 61 yards
Thomas More	Receiving	Anthony Grossnickle	4 receptions, 38 yards
Dayton	Passing	Bryce Schondelmyer	15/22, 110 yards, 2 TD
Dayton	Rushing	Luke Hansen	15 carries, 131 yards, 2 TD
Dayton	Receiving	Gavin Lochow	9 receptions, 83 yards, 2 TD

=== at Robert Morris ===
Dayton Flyers (1-1) vs. Robert Morris Colonials (1-2) – Game summary

Quarter	1	2	3	4	Total
Flyers	0	7	0	10	17
Colonials	7	0	7	0	14

at Joe Walton Stadium • Moon Township, PA

- Date: September 20
- Game time: 2:00 PM EDT
- Game weather: Sunny
- Game attendance: 2,389
- Referee: Lance Carlen
- TV announcers (NEC Front Row): Chris Shovlin (play-by-play) and Ray Thomas (analyst)

Game information

First Quarter

- (0:16) RMU – Ethan Shine 2-yard run, Jayson Jenkins kick (Drive: 9 plays, 66 yards, 6:18; Robert Morris 7–0)

Second Quarter

- (5:45) DAY – Gavin Lochow 7-yard pass from Bryce Schondelmyer, Robby Smart kick (Drive: 9 plays, 67 yards, 4:35; Tied 7–7)

Third Quarter

- (7:41) RMU – Ethan Shine 9-yard run, Jayson Jenkins kick (Drive: 11 plays, 75 yards, 7:19; Robert Morris 14–7)

Fourth Quarter

- (12:35) DAY – Luke Hansen 19-yard pass from Bryce Schondelmyer, Robby Smart kick (Drive: 8 plays, 71 yards, 3:54; Tied 14–14)
- (3:28) DAY – Robby Smart 21-yard field goal (Drive: 9 plays, 77 yards, 5:45; Dayton 17–14)

Statistics	DAY	RMU
First downs	16	18
Total yards	284	264
Rushing yards	97	149
Passing yards	187	115
Passing: Comp–Att–Int	13–20–0	10–25–0
Time of possession	26:40	33:20

Team	Category	Player	Statistics
Dayton	Passing	Bryce Schondelmyer	13/20, 187 yards, 2 TD
Dayton	Rushing	Mason Hackett	19 carries, 94 yards
Dayton	Receiving	Michael Mussari	3 receptions, 52 yards
Robert Morris	Passing	Zach Tanner	7/15, 89 yards
Robert Morris	Rushing	Ethan Shine	16 carries, 55 yards, 2 TD
Robert Morris	Receiving	Jaqai Carter	1 reception, 31 yards

=== Stetson ===
Stetson Hatters (1-3) vs. Dayton Flyers (2-1) – Game summary

Quarter	1	2	3	4	Total
Hatters	7	7	0	0	14
Flyers	21	21	6	0	48

at Welcome Stadium • Dayton, OH

- Date: September 27
- Game time: 12:00 PM EDT
- Game weather: Sunny • Temperature: 76 °F (24 °C) • Wind: N at 1 mile per hour (1.6 km/h)
- Game attendance: 5,262
- Referee: David Hergert
- TV: YouTube

Game information

First Quarter

- (12:43) DAY – Donovan Weatherly 50-yard pass from Bryce Schondelmyer, Robby Smart kick (Drive: 5 plays, 64 yards, 2:11; Dayton 7–0)
- (9:43) STET – Dylan Redmon 27-yard pass from Kael Alexander, Daniel Holbrook kick (Drive: 6 plays, 68 yards, 2:54; Tied 7–7)
- (7:26) DAY – Michael Mussari 54-yard pass from Bryce Schondelmyer, Robby Smart kick (Drive: 4 plays, 66 yards, 2:10; Dayton 14–7)
- (1:44) DAY – Michael Mussari 21-yard pass from Bryce Schondelmyer, Robby Smart kick (Drive: 8 plays, 63 yards, 4:44; Dayton 21–7)

Second Quarter

- (8:25) DAY – Gavin Lochow 7-yard pass from Bryce Schondelmyer, Robby Smart kick (Drive: 10 plays, 74 yards, 6:08; Dayton 28–7)
- (6:35) DAY – Dominic Vrbancic 7-yard pass from Bryce Schondelmyer, Robby Smart kick (Drive: 1 play, 7 yards, 0:05; Dayton 35–7)
- (2:02) STET – Dylan Redmon 11-yard pass from Kael Alexander, Daniel Holbrook kick (Drive: 11 plays, 75 yards, 4:33; Dayton 35–14)
- (0:00) DAY – Vincent Firenze 99-yard interception, Robby Smart kick (Dayton 42–14)

Third Quarter

- (6:26) DAY – Luke Hansen 7-yard run (Drive: 12 plays, 85 yards, 6:54; Dayton 48–14)

Fourth Quarter

No scoring plays

Statistics	STET	DAY
First downs	18	22
Total yards	299	461
Rushing yards	101	110
Passing yards	198	351
Passing: Comp–Att–Int	18–32–2	22–28–0
Time of possession	26:45	33:15

Team	Category	Player	Statistics
Stetson	Passing	Kael Alexander	15/29, 190 yards, 2 TD, 2 INT
Stetson	Rushing	Cayden Betts	10 carries, 35 yards
Stetson	Receiving	Dylan Redmon	3 receptions, 58 yards, 2 TD
Dayton	Passing	Bryce Schondelmyer	19/23, 333 yards, 5 TD
Dayton	Rushing	Levi Moell	7 carries, 46 yards
Dayton	Receiving	Michael Mussari	8 receptions, 169 yards, 2 TD

=== at Morehead State ===
Dayton Flyers (3-1) vs. Morehead State Eagles (2-3) – Game summary

Quarter	1	2	3	4	Total
Flyers	7	21	0	7	35
Eagles	0	0	28	0	28

at Jayne Stadium • Morehead, KY

- Date: October 4
- Game time: 1:00 PM EDT
- TV announcers (ESPN+): Jared Stacy (play-by-play) and Mark Ledford (analyst)

Statistics	DAY	MORE
First downs		
Total yards		
Rushing yards		
Passing yards		
Passing: Comp–Att–Int		
Time of possession		

Team	Category	Player	Statistics
Dayton	Passing		
Dayton	Rushing		
Dayton	Receiving		
Morehead State	Passing		
Morehead State	Rushing		
Morehead State	Receiving		

=== at Valparaiso ===
Dayton Flyers (4-2) vs. Valparaiso Beacons (1-4) – Game summary

Quarter	1	2	3	4	Total
Flyers	14	27	0	0	41
Beacons	0	0	0	10	10

at Brown Field • Valparaiso, IN

- Date: October 11
- Game time: 1:00 PM CDT
- TV announcers (ESPN+): Todd Ickow (play-by-play) and Tom Byrne (analyst)

Statistics	DAY	VAL
First downs		
Total yards		
Rushing yards		
Passing yards		
Passing: Comp–Att–Int		
Time of possession		

Team	Category	Player	Statistics
Dayton	Passing		
Dayton	Rushing		
Dayton	Receiving		
Valparaiso	Passing		
Valparaiso	Rushing		
Valparaiso	Receiving		

=== Butler ===
Butler Bulldogs (4-3) vs. Dayton Flyers (5-1) – Game summary

Quarter	1	2	3	4	Total
Bulldogs	7	10	3	3	23
Flyers	0	7	7	3	17

at Welcome Stadium • Dayton, OH

- Date: October 18
- Game time: 12:00 PM EDT
- Game weather: Sunny • Temperature: 72 °F (22 °C) • Wind: SW at 10 miles per hour (16 km/h)
- Game attendance: 3,423
- Referee: Carl Chatman
- TV announcers (YouTube): Luke West Poley (play-by-play) and Josh Copeland (analyst)

Game information

First Quarter

- (1:49) BUT – Ethan Loss 67-yard pass from Reagan Andrew, Ryan Short kick (Drive: 9 plays, 93 yards, 5:21; Butler 7–0)

Second Quarter

- (11:33) DAY – Gavin Lochow 20-yard pass from Bryce Schondelmyer, Robby Smart kick (Drive: 11 plays, 73 yards, 5:11; Tied 7–7)
- (3:32) BUT – Archie Cox 16-yard pass from Reagan Andrew, Ryan Short kick (Drive: 13 plays, 80 yards, 7:54; Butler 14–7)
- (0:00) BUT – Ryan Short 41-yard field goal (Drive: 9 plays, 43 yards, 0:57; Butler 17–7)

Third Quarter

- (4:41) DAY – Donovan Weatherly 4-yard pass from Drew VanVleet, Trevor Henkle kick (Drive: 13 plays, 86 yards, 7:09; Butler 17–14)
- (1:14) BUT – Ryan Short 29-yard field goal (Drive: 6 plays, 64 yards, 3:27; Butler 20–14)

Fourth Quarter

- (2:56) BUT – Ryan Short 26-yard field goal (Drive: 16 plays, 87 yards, 9:04; Butler 23–14)
- (0:52) DAY – Trevor Henkle 34-yard field goal (Drive: 11 plays, 53 yards, 1:58; Butler 23–17)

Statistics	BUT	DAY
First downs	16	15
Total yards	360	298
Rushing yards	104	142
Passing yards	256	156
Passing: Comp–Att–Int	18–23–0	16–30–0
Time of possession	33:29	26:31

Team	Category	Player	Statistics
Butler	Passing	Reagan Andrew	18/23, 256 yards, 2 TD
Butler	Rushing	Reagan Andrew	20 carries, 78 yards
Butler	Receiving	Ethan Loss	3 receptions, 93 yards, TD
Dayton	Passing	Drew VanVleet	7/16, 79 yards, TD
Dayton	Rushing	Luke Hansen	15 carries, 105 yards
Dayton	Receiving	Gavin Lochow	8 receptions, 54 yards, TD

=== No. 19 Presbyterian ===
No. 19 Presbyterian Blue Hose (7-0) vs. Dayton Flyers (5-2) – Game summary

Quarter	1	2	3	4	Total
No. 19 Blue Hose	-	-	-	-	0
Flyers	-	-	-	-	0

at Welcome Stadium • Dayton, OH

- Date: October 25
- Game time: 12:00 PM EDT
- TV: YouTube

Statistics	PRES	DAY
First downs		
Total yards		
Rushing yards		
Passing yards		
Passing: Comp–Att–Int		
Time of possession		

Team	Category	Player	Statistics
Presbyterian	Passing		
Presbyterian	Rushing		
Presbyterian	Receiving		
Dayton	Passing		
Dayton	Rushing		
Dayton	Receiving		

=== at San Diego ===
Dayton Flyers (6-2) vs. San Diego Toreros (4-4) – Game summary

Quarter	1	2	3	4	Total
Flyers	-	-	-	-	0
Toreros	-	-	-	-	0

at Torero Stadium • San Diego, CA

- Date: November 1
- Game time: 1:00 PM PDT

Statistics	DAY	USD
First downs		
Total yards		
Rushing yards		
Passing yards		
Passing: Comp–Att–Int		
Time of possession		

Team	Category	Player	Statistics
Dayton	Passing		
Dayton	Rushing		
Dayton	Receiving		
San Diego	Passing		
San Diego	Rushing		
San Diego	Receiving		

=== Drake ===
Drake Bulldogs (6-3) vs. Dayton Flyers (6-3) – Game summary

Quarter	1	2	3	4	Total
Bulldogs	0	14	0	0	14
Flyers	0	0	0	6	6

at Welcome Stadium • Dayton, OH

- Date: November 15
- Game time: 12:00 PM EST
- Game attendance: 3,178
- TV: YouTube

Game information

Second Quarter

- (12:16) DRKE – Logan Inagawa 3-yard Run, Harry Balke Kick (Drive: 11 plays, 99 yards, 4:43; Drake 7–0)
- (8:49) DRKE – Nick Herman 66-yard Run, Harry Balke Kick (Drive: 2 plays, 69 yards, 0:48; Drake 14–0)

Fourth Quarter

- (8:40) DAY – Michael Mussari 23-yard pass from Liam Poronsky, Trevor Henkle PAT failed (Drive: 14 plays, 93 yards, 5:48; Drake 14–6)

Statistics	DRKE	DAY
First downs	15	20
Total yards	307	340
Rushing yards	248	143
Passing yards	59	197
Passing: Comp–Att–Int	7–12–0	17–37–2
Time of possession	25:54	34:06

Team	Category	Player	Statistics
Drake	Passing	Logan Inagawa	7/12, 59 yards
Drake	Rushing	Nick Herman	15 carries, 153 yards, TD
Drake	Receiving	Taj Hughes	3 receptions, 44 yards
Dayton	Passing	Liam Poronsky	12/22, 107 yards, TD
Dayton	Rushing	Gavin Lochow	17 carries, 101 yards
Dayton	Receiving	Gavin Lochow	4 receptions, 63 yards

=== at Davidson ===
Dayton Flyers (0-0) vs. Davidson Wildcats (0-0) – Game summary

Quarter	1	2	3	4	Total
Flyers	-	-	-	-	0
Wildcats	-	-	-	-	0

at Davidson College Stadium • Davidson, NC

- Date: November 22
- Game time: 1:00 PM EST

Statistics	DAY	DAV
First downs		
Total yards		
Rushing yards		
Passing yards		
Passing: Comp–Att–Int		
Time of possession		

Team	Category	Player	Statistics
Dayton	Passing		
Dayton	Rushing		
Dayton	Receiving		
Davidson	Passing		
Davidson	Rushing		
Davidson	Receiving		
