= 2025 San Diego Toreros football team =

American college football season

2025 San Diego Toreros football
- Conference: Pioneer Football League
- Record: 8–4 (6–2 PFL)
- Head coach: Brandon Moore (3rd season)
- Offensive coordinator: Matt Aponte (3rd season)
- Defensive coordinator: Isaac Carter (3rd season)
- Co-defensive coordinator: Mike McGlinchey Jr. (3rd season)
- Home stadium: Torero Stadium

2025 Pioneer Football League standings
	Conf.			Overall
Team	W		L	W		L
Drake $^	7	–	1	8	–	4
Presbyterian	6	–	2	10	–	2
San Diego	6	–	2	8	–	4
St. Thomas	5	–	3	7	–	5
Dayton	5	–	3	7	–	4
Morehead State	4	–	4	6	–	6
Butler	4	–	4	6	–	6
Marist	3	–	5	5	–	7
Stetson	2	–	6	3	–	9
Davidson	1	–	7	2	–	10
Valparaiso	1	–	7	2	–	10
$ – Conference champion; ^ – FCS playoff participant; Rankings from STATS Poll

The 2025 San Diego Toreros football team represented the University of San Diego as a member of the Pioneer Football League (PFL) during the 2025 NCAA Division I FCS football season. They were led by third-year head coach Brandon Moore, and the Toreros played home games at Torero Stadium located in San Diego.

== Schedule ==
Date	Time	Opponent	Site	TV	Result	Attendance
August 30	5:00 p.m.	Cal Poly*	Torero Stadium; San Diego, CA	ESPN+	L 17–41	5,806
September 6	6:00 p.m.	No. 24 Southern Utah*	Torero Stadium; San Diego, CA	ESPN+	W 30–27	2,564
September 13	12:00 p.m.	at No. 4 Montana State*	Bobcat Stadium; Bozeman, MT	ESPN+	L 7–41	21,917
September 20	9:00 a.m.	at Princeton*	Princeton Stadium; Princeton, NJ	ESPN+	W 42–35	3,656
September 27	1:00 p.m.	St. Thomas (MN)	Torero Stadium; San Diego, CA	ESPN+	W 30–27	1,563
October 4	9:00 a.m.	at Marist	Leonidoff Field; Poughkeepsie, NY	ESPN+	L 14–19	4,183
October 11	2:00 p.m.	Drake^{†}	Torero Stadium; San Diego, CA	ESPN+	L 16–19	2,794
October 25	9:00 a.m.	at Davidson	Davidson College Stadium; Davidson, NC	ESPN+	W 40–28	2,146
November 1	1:00 p.m.	Dayton	Torero Stadium; San Diego, CA	ESPN+	W 31–13	1,063
November 8	10:00 a.m.	at Valparaiso	Brown Field; Valparaiso, IN	ESPN+	W 43–27	1,114
November 15	1:00 p.m.	Butler	Torero Stadium; San Diego, CA	ESPN+	W 29–7	1,013
November 22	10:00 a.m.	at Stetson	Spec Martin Stadium; DeLand, FL	ESPN+	W 42–8	1,721
*Non-conference game; ^{†}Homecoming; Rankings from STATS Poll released prior to the game; All times are in Pacific time

== Game summaries ==
=== Cal Poly ===
Cal Poly Mustangs (0–0) at San Diego Toreros (0–0) – Game summary

Quarter	1	2	3	4	Total
Mustangs	14	10	3	14	41
Toreros	0	7	3	7	17

at Torero Stadium • San Diego, CA

- Date: August 30
- Game time: 8:00 PM PDT
- Game weather: Sunny • Temperature: 81 °F (27 °C) • Wind: SE at 9 miles per hour (14 km/h)
- Game attendance: 5,806
- Referee: Jeff Rink
- TV announcers (ESPN+): Jack Cronin (play-by-play) and Braden Surprenant (analyst)

Game information

First quarter

- CP – Michael Briscoe 12-yard pass from Ty Dieffenbach (Gianluca Dimauro kick), 11:52. Mustangs 7–0. Drive: 9 plays, 75 yards, 3:08.
- CP – Michael Briscoe 14-yard pass from Ty Dieffenbach (Gianluca Dimauro kick), 5:58. Mustangs 14–0. Drive: 10 plays, 72 yards, 4:31.

Second quarter

- CP – Gianluca Dimauro 30-yard field goal, 14:15. Mustangs 17–0. Drive: 12 plays, 63 yards, 5:34.
- CP – Ty Dieffenbach 43-yard run (Noah Serna kick), 1:05. Mustangs 24–0. Drive: 4 plays, 91 yards, 1:16.
- USD – Bradley Schlom 45-yard pass from Dom Nankil (Emiliano Salazar kick), 0:00. Mustangs 24–7. 'Drive:

Third quarter

- USD – Emiliano Salazar 35-yard field goal, 10:21. Mustangs 24–10. Drive: 9 plays, 47 yards, 0:39.
- CP – Gianluca Dimauro 26-yard field goal, 6:49. Mustangs 27–10. Drive: 11 plays, 57 yards, 3:32.

Fourth quarter

- USD – Adam Carter 79-yard run (Emiliano Salazar kick), 14:49. Mustangs 27–17. Drive: 3 plays, 88 yards, 0:59.
- CP – Tyrei Washington 1-yard run (Noah Serna kick), 12:29. Mustangs 34–17. Drive: 7 plays, 63 yards, 2:14.
- CP – Alek Marshall 14-yard pass from Anthony Grigsby Jr. (Gianluca Dimauro kick), 1:56. Mustangs 41–17. Drive: 5 plays, 70 yards, 1:31.

Statistics	CP	USD
First downs	32	16
Plays–yards	71–469	63–367
Rushes–yards	38–134	33–165
Passing yards	335	202
Passing: Comp–Att–Int	22–33–0	19–30–0
Turnovers	0	0
Time of possession	30:53	29:07

Team	Category	Player	Statistics
Cal Poly	Passing	Ty Dieffenbach	18/27, 263 yards, 2 TD
Cal Poly	Rushing	Ty Dieffenbach	11 carries, 69 yards, TD
Cal Poly	Receiving	Michael Briscoe	7 receptions, 110 yards, 2 TD
San Diego	Passing	Dom Nankil	19/30, 202 yards. TD
San Diego	Rushing	Adam Criter	1 carry, 79 yards, TD
San Diego	Receiving	Josh Heverly	8 receptions, 69 yards

=== No. 24 Southern Utah ===
No. 24 Southern Utah Thunderbirds (1-0) vs. San Diego Toreros (0-1) – Game summary

Quarter	1	2	3	4	Total
No. 24 Thunderbirds	-	-	-	-	0
Toreros	-	-	-	-	0

at Torero Stadium • San Diego, CA

- Date: September 6
- Game time: 9:00 PM PDT
- TV: ESPN+

Statistics	SUU	USD
First downs		
Total yards		
Rushing yards		
Passing yards		
Passing: Comp–Att–Int		
Time of possession		

Team	Category	Player	Statistics
Southern Utah	Passing		
Southern Utah	Rushing		
Southern Utah	Receiving		
San Diego	Passing		
San Diego	Rushing		
San Diego	Receiving		

=== at No. 4 Montana State ===
San Diego Toreros (1-1) at No. 4 Montana State Bobcats (0-2) – Game summary

Quarter	1	2	3	4	Total
Toreros	0	0	0	7	7
No. 4 Bobcats	10	14	14	3	41

at Bobcat Stadium • Bozeman, MT

- Date: September 13
- Game time: 12:00 p.m. PDT
- Game weather: Sunny, 65 °F (18 °C)
- Game attendance: 21,917
- Referee: Jeff Rink
- TV: ESPN+

Game information
First quarter
- MTST – Taco Dowler 45-yard pass from Justin Lamson (Myles Sansted kick), 9:21. Bobcats 7–0. Drive: 7 plays, 74 yards, 3:26.
- MTST – Myles Sansted 43-yard field goal, 2:53. Bobcats 10–0. Drive: 9 plays, 45 yards, 4:29.

Second quarter

- MTST – Adam Jones 17-yard pass from Justin Lamson (Myles Sansted kick), 6:32. Bobcats 17–0. Drive: 4 plays, 52 yards, 1:49.
- MTST – Justin Lamson 24-yard run (Myles Sansted kick), 0:22. Bobcats 24–0. Drive: 5 plays, 85 yards, 0:51.

Third quarter

- MTST – Taco Dowler 16-yard pass from Justin Lamson (Myles Sansted kick), 11:04. Bobcats 31–0. Drive: 8 plays, 75 yards, 3:56.
- MTST – Julius Davis 17-yard run (Myles Sansted kick), 5:41. Bobcats 38–0. Drive: 6 plays, 90 yards, 2:38.

Fourth quarter

- USD – Josh Heverly 8-yard pass from Dom Nankil (Emiliano Salazar kick), 12:59. Bobcats 38–7. Drive: 10 plays, 65 yards, 3:53.
- MTST – Myles Sansted 40-yard field goal, 6:51. Bobcats 41–7. Drive: 11 plays, 53 yards, 6:08.

Statistics	USD	MTST
First downs	12	28
Plays–yards	52–209	73–539
Rushes–yards	25–66	42–218
Passing yards	143	321
Passing: Comp–Att–Int	14–27–0	27–31–1
Turnovers	0	1
Time of possession	24:57	35:03

Team	Category	Player	Statistics
San Diego	Passing	Dom Nankil	13/24, 124 yards, TD
San Diego	Rushing	Adam Criter	10 carries, 49 yards
San Diego	Receiving	Peyton Smith	3 receptions, 35 yards
Montana State	Passing	Justin Lamson	23/26, 293 yards, 3 TD, INT
Montana State	Rushing	Julius Davis	8 carries, 83 yards, TD
Montana State	Receiving	Taco Dowler	8 receptions, 116 yards, 2 TD

=== at Princeton ===
San Diego Toreros (1-2) vs. Princeton Tigers (0-0) – Game summary

Quarter	1	2	3	4	Total
Toreros	0	21	0	21	42
Tigers	21	14	0	0	35

at Princeton Stadium • Princeton, NJ

- Date: September 20
- Game time: 9:00 a.m. PDT
- Game weather: Sunny • Wind: NE at 10 miles per hour (16 km/h)
- Game attendance: 3,656
- Referee: Marc Queen
- TV: ESPN+

Game information

First quarter

- (11:08) PRIN – Asher Weiner 1-yard run, Esteban Nunez Perez kick (Drive: 10 plays, 75 yards, 3:52; Princeton 7-0)
- (8:57) PRIN – Dareion Murphy 1-yard run, Esteban Nunez Perez kick (Drive: 3 plays, 32 yards, 1:04; Princeton 14-0)
- (6:15) PRIN – Ethan Clark 55-yard run, Esteban Nunez Perez kick (Drive: 2 plays, 63 yards, 0:44; Princeton 21-0)

Second quarter

- (12:56) USD – Josh Heverly 4-yard pass from Tyler Voss, Emiliano Salazar kick (Drive: 5 plays, 29 yards, 2:23; Princeton 21-7)
- (11:15) PRIN – Ethan Clark 25-yard pass from Kai Colón, Esteban Nunez Perez kick (Drive: 5 plays, 75 yards, 1:41; Princeton 28-7)
- (7:11) USD – Chrostopher Hall 37-yard pass from Tyler Voss, Emiliano Salazar kick (Drive: 8 plays, 70 yards, 3:58; Princeton 28-14)
- (5:19) PRIN – Dareion Murphy 18-yard run, Esteban Nunez Perez kick (Drive: 5 plays, 75 yards, 1:52; Princeton 35-14)
- (0:15) USD – Josh Heverly 17-yard pass from Tyler Voss, Emiliano Salazar kick (Drive: 11 plays, 80 yards, 1:25; Princeton 35-21)

Third quarter

No scoring plays

Fourth quarter

- (9:50) USD – Adam Criter 4-yard run, Emiliano Salazar kick (Drive: 14 plays, 67 yards, 6:28; Princeton 35-28)
- (8:09) USD – Adam Criter 24-yard run, Emiliano Salazar kick (Drive: 3 plays, 32 yards, 1:29; 35-35)
- (1:04) USD – Adam Criter 8-yard run, Emiliano Salazar kick (Drive: 11 plays, 81 yards, 5:57; San Diego 42-35)

Statistics	USD	PRIN
First downs	25	16
Total yards	485	399
Rushing yards	133	116
Passing yards	352	283
Passing: Comp–Att–Int	38–51–0	18–27–0
Time of possession	38:22	21:38

Team	Category	Player	Statistics
San Diego	Passing	Tyler Voss	25/34, 237 yards, 3 TD
San Diego	Rushing	Adam Criter	25 carries, 105 yards, 3 TD
San Diego	Receiving	Cole Monach	7 receptions, 91 yards
Princeton	Passing	Kai Colón	12/18, 196 yards, TD
Princeton	Rushing	Ethan Clark	7 carries, 72 yards, TD
Princeton	Receiving	Charley Rossi	2 receptions, 79 yards

=== St. Thomas (MN) ===
St. Thomas Tommies (2-1) vs. San Diego Toreros (2-2) – Game summary

Quarter	1	2	3	4	Total
Tommies	3	14	10	0	27
Toreros	0	3	21	6	30

at Torero Stadium • San Diego, CA

- Date: September 27
- Game time: 1:00 PM PDT
- TV announcers (ESPN+): Jack Cronin (play-by-play) and George Whitfield Jr. (analyst)

Statistics	STMN	USD
First downs		
Total yards		
Rushing yards		
Passing yards		
Passing: Comp–Att–Int		
Time of possession		

Team	Category	Player	Statistics
St. Thomas (MN)	Passing		
St. Thomas (MN)	Rushing		
St. Thomas (MN)	Receiving		
San Diego	Passing		
San Diego	Rushing		
San Diego	Receiving		

=== at Marist ===
San Diego Toreros (3-2) vs. Marist Red Foxes (2-2) – Game summary

Quarter	1	2	3	4	Total
Toreros	7	0	0	7	14
Red Foxes	6	0	6	7	19

at Leonidoff Field • Poughkeepsie, NY

- Date: October 4
- Game time: 9:00 a.m. PDT
- TV announcers (ESPN+): Geoff Brault (play-by-play), Steve Eggink (analyst) and William Rosen (sideline)

Statistics	USD	MRST
First downs		
Total yards		
Rushing yards		
Passing yards		
Passing: Comp–Att–Int		
Time of possession		

Team	Category	Player	Statistics
San Diego	Passing		
San Diego	Rushing		
San Diego	Receiving		
Marist	Passing		
Marist	Rushing		
Marist	Receiving		

=== Drake ===
Drake Bulldogs (2-2) vs. San Diego Toreros (3-3) – Game summary

Quarter	1	2	3	4	Total
Bulldogs	0	7	0	12	19
Toreros	6	7	0	3	16

at Torero Stadium • San Diego, CA

- Date: October 11
- Game time: 2:00 p.m. PDT
- Game weather: Sunny
- Game attendance: 2,794
- Referee: Kelly Holman
- TV announcers (ESPN+): Jack Cronin (play-by-play) and George Whitfield Jr. (analyst)

Game information

First Quarter

- (7:18) USD – Emiliano Salazar 25-yard Field Goal (Drive: 13 plays, 59 yards, 4:57; San Diego 0–3)
- (2:11) USD – Emiliano Salazar 47-yard Field Goal (Drive: 10 plays, 35 yards, 3:49; San Diego 0–6)

Second Quarter

- (3:53) DRKE – Luke Woodson 33-yard Run, Harry Balke Kick (Drive: 2 plays, 54 yards, 0:29; Drake 7–6)
- (2:35) USD – Cole Monach 73-yard pass from Yosei Takahashi, Emiliano Salazar Kick (Drive: 3 plays, 75 yards, 1:18; San Diego 7–13)

Fourth Quarter

- (14:56) DRKE – Harry Balke 43-yard Field Goal (Drive: 11 plays, 54 yards, 5:37; San Diego 10–13)
- (4:38) DRKE – Logan Inagawa 5-yard Run, Harry Balke PAT failed (Drive: 8 plays, 67 yards, 3:44; Drake 16–13)
- (1:09) USD – Emiliano Salazar 41-yard Field Goal (Drive: 10 plays, 41 yards, 3:29; Tied 16–16)
- (0:00) DRKE – Harry Balke 55-yard Field Goal (Drive: 7 plays, 27 yards, 1:09; Drake 19–16)

Statistics	DRKE	USD
First downs	18	16
Total yards	341	314
Rushing yards	180	132
Passing yards	161	182
Passing: Comp–Att–Int	16–25–0	15–29–0
Time of possession	30:03	29:57

Team	Category	Player	Statistics
Drake	Passing	Chase Spellman	14/21, 128 yards
Drake	Rushing	Nick Herman	15 carries, 96 yards
Drake	Receiving	Hank Foley	1 reception, 36 yards
San Diego	Passing	Tyler Voss	14/28, 109 yards
San Diego	Rushing	Adam Criter	28 carries, 108 yards
San Diego	Receiving	Cole Monach	2 receptions, 82 yards, TD

=== at Davidson ===
San Diego Toreros (3-4) vs. Davidson Wildcats (1-6) – Game summary

Quarter	1	2	3	4	Total
Toreros	-	-	-	-	0
Wildcats	-	-	-	-	0

at Davidson College Stadium • Davidson, NC

- Date: October 25
- Game time: 1:00 PM EDT

Statistics	USD	DAV
First downs		
Total yards		
Rushing yards		
Passing yards		
Passing: Comp–Att–Int		
Time of possession		

Team	Category	Player	Statistics
San Diego	Passing		
San Diego	Rushing		
San Diego	Receiving		
Davidson	Passing		
Davidson	Rushing		
Davidson	Receiving		

=== Dayton ===
Dayton Flyers (6-2) vs. San Diego Toreros (4-4) – Game summary

Quarter	1	2	3	4	Total
Flyers	-	-	-	-	0
Toreros	-	-	-	-	0

at Torero Stadium • San Diego, CA

- Date: November 1
- Game time: 1:00 PM PDT

Statistics	DAY	USD
First downs		
Total yards		
Rushing yards		
Passing yards		
Passing: Comp–Att–Int		
Time of possession		

Team	Category	Player	Statistics
Dayton	Passing		
Dayton	Rushing		
Dayton	Receiving		
San Diego	Passing		
San Diego	Rushing		
San Diego	Receiving		

=== at Valparaiso ===
San Diego Toreros (5-4) vs. Valparaiso Beacons (1-8) – Game summary

Quarter	1	2	3	4	Total
Toreros	-	-	-	-	0
Beacons	-	-	-	-	0

at Brown Field • Valparaiso, IN

- Date: November 8
- Game time: 3:00 PM CST

Statistics	USD	VAL
First downs		
Total yards		
Rushing yards		
Passing yards		
Passing: Comp–Att–Int		
Time of possession		

Team	Category	Player	Statistics
San Diego	Passing		
San Diego	Rushing		
San Diego	Receiving		
Valparaiso	Passing		
Valparaiso	Rushing		
Valparaiso	Receiving		

=== Butler ===
Butler Bulldogs (5-5) vs. San Diego Toreros (6-4) – Game summary

Quarter	1	2	3	4	Total
Bulldogs	0	0	7	0	7
Toreros	0	3	3	23	29

at Torero Stadium • San Diego, CA

- Date: November 15
- Game time: 1:00 PM PST
- Game weather: Rainy
- Game attendance: 1,013
- Referee: Michael Frain
- TV announcers (ESPN+): Jack Cronin (play-by-play) and George Whitfield Jr. (analyst)

Game information

First Quarter

No scoring plays

Second Quarter

- (0:35) USD – Emiliano Salazar 35-yard field goal (Drive: 9 plays, 58 yards, 3:43; San Diego 3–0)

Third Quarter

- (4:39) USD – Emiliano Salazar 32-yard field goal (Drive: 5 plays, 41 yards, 2:31; San Diego 6–0)
- (0:12) BUT – Brady Preston 10-yard pass from Reagan Andrew, Ryan Short kick (Drive: 9 plays, 64 yards, 4:20; Butler 7–6)

Fourth Quarter

- (10:58) USD – Ryan Short safety (San Diego 8–7)
- (8:08) USD – Matt Colombo 8-yard run, Emiliano Salazar kick (Drive: 5 plays, 58 yards, 2:43; San Diego 15–7)
- (6:35) USD – Josh Heverly 43-yard pass from Dom Nankil, Emiliano Salazar kick (Drive: 3 plays, 45 yards, 0:43; San Diego 22–7)
- (0:31) USD – Adam Criter 4-yard run, Emiliano Salazar kick (Drive: 8 plays, 34 yards, 3:59; San Diego 29–7)

Statistics	BUT	USD
First downs	15	15
Total yards	216	383
Rushing yards	75	165
Passing yards	141	218
Passing: Comp–Att–Int	15–23–1	9–17–1
Time of possession	32:53	27:07

Team	Category	Player	Statistics
Butler	Passing	Reagan Andrew	15/23, 141 yards, TD, INT
Butler	Rushing	Reagan Andrew	15 carries, 49 yards
Butler	Receiving	Brady Preston	2 receptions, 34 yards, TD
San Diego	Passing	Dom Nankil	9/17, 218 yards, TD, INT
San Diego	Rushing	Matt Colombo	21 carries, 113 yards, TD
San Diego	Receiving	Cole Monach	4 receptions, 119 yards

=== at Stetson ===
San Diego Toreros (0-0) vs. Stetson Hatters (0-0) – Game summary

Quarter	1	2	3	4	Total
Toreros	-	-	-	-	0
Hatters	-	-	-	-	0

at Spec Martin Stadium • DeLand, FL

- Date: November 22
- Game time: 4:00 PM EST

Statistics	USD	STET
First downs		
Total yards		
Rushing yards		
Passing yards		
Passing: Comp–Att–Int		
Time of possession		

Team	Category	Player	Statistics
San Diego	Passing		
San Diego	Rushing		
San Diego	Receiving		
Stetson	Passing		
Stetson	Rushing		
Stetson	Receiving		
