= 2025 Marist Red Foxes football team =

American college football season

2025 Marist Red Foxes football
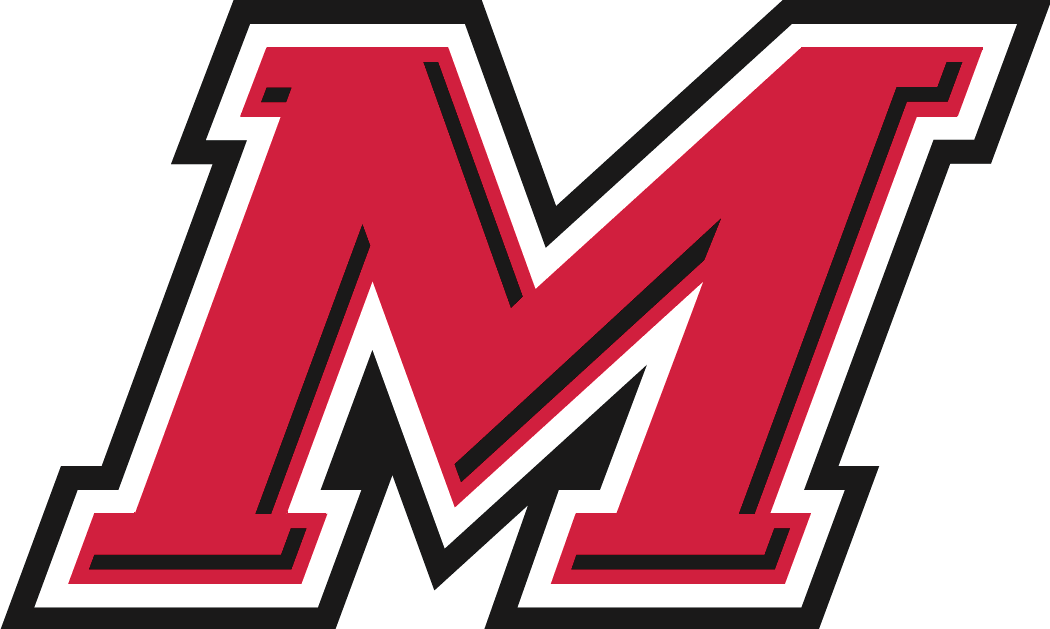
- Conference: Pioneer Football League
- Record: 5–7 (3–5 PFL)
- Head coach: Mike Willis (2nd season)
- Offensive coordinator: TJ Weyl (1st season)
- Defensive coordinator: Mike Horan (2nd season)
- Home stadium: Tenney Stadium at Leonidoff Field

2025 Pioneer Football League standings
	Conf.			Overall
Team	W		L	W		L
Drake $^	7	–	1	8	–	4
Presbyterian	6	–	2	10	–	2
San Diego	6	–	2	8	–	4
St. Thomas	5	–	3	7	–	5
Dayton	5	–	3	7	–	4
Morehead State	4	–	4	6	–	6
Butler	4	–	4	6	–	6
Marist	3	–	5	5	–	7
Stetson	2	–	6	3	–	9
Davidson	1	–	7	2	–	10
Valparaiso	1	–	7	2	–	10
$ – Conference champion; ^ – FCS playoff participant; Rankings from STATS Poll

The 2025 Marist Red Foxes football team represented Marist University as a member of the Pioneer Football League (PFL) during the 2025 NCAA Division I FCS football season. Led by second-year head coach Mike Willis, the Red Foxes played home games at Tenney Stadium at Leonidoff Field in Poughkeepsie, New York.

== Schedule ==
Date	Time	Opponent	Site	TV	Result	Attendance
August 29	7:00 p.m.	New Haven*	Leonidoff Field; Poughkeepsie, NY	ESPN+	W 31–14	4,955
September 6	1:00 p.m.	Bucknell*	Leonidoff Field; Poughkeepsie, NY	ESPN+	L 23–34	1,907
September 13	1:00 p.m.	at Wagner*	Wagner College Stadium; Staten Island, NY	NEC Front Row	W 21–10	3,167
September 27	1:00 p.m.	at Butler	Bud and Jackie Sellick Bowl; Indianapolis, IN	FloSports	L 28–31	4,167
October 4	12:00 p.m.	San Diego	Leonidoff Field; Poughkeepsie, NY	ESPN+	W 19–14	4,183
October 10	7:00 p.m.	at Penn*	Franklin Field; Philadelphia, PA	ESPN+	L 9–28	1,164
October 18	2:00 p.m.	at Morehead State	Phil Simms Stadium; Morehead, KY	ESPN+	L 21–23	8,245
October 25	12:00 p.m.	Drake	Leonidoff Field; Poughkeepsie, NY	ESPN+	L 17–31	1,942
November 1	2:00 p.m.	at St. Thomas (MN)	O'Shaughnessy Stadium; St. Paul, MN	Midco Sports Plus	L 0–45	2,150
November 8	1:00 p.m.	Stetson	Leonidoff Field; Poughkeepsie, NY	ESPN+	W 41–13	983
November 15	12:00 p.m.	Davidson	Leonidoff Field; Poughkeepsie, NY	ESPN+	W 37–10	1,148
November 22	1:00 p.m.	at Presbyterian	Bailey Memorial Stadium; Clinton, SC	ESPN+	L 25–29	2,911
*Non-conference game; All times are in Eastern time

== Game summaries ==
=== New Haven ===
New Haven Chargers (0-0) at Marist Red Foxes (0-0) – Game summary

Quarter	1	2	3	4	Total
Chargers	0	7	0	7	14
Red Foxes	17	0	7	7	31

at Leonidoff Field • Poughkeepsie, NY

- Date: August 29
- Game time: 7:00 p.m. EDT
- Game weather: Cloudy • Temperature: 69 °F (21 °C) • Wind: N at 4 miles per hour (6.4 km/h)
- Game attendance: 4,955
- Referee: Eric Lewis
- TV announcers (ESPN+): Geoff Brault (play-by-play), Steve Eggink (analyst), William Rosen (sideline)

Game information

First quarter

- MRST – Samer Layous 35-yard field goal, 10:49. Red Foxes 3–0. Drive: 10 plays, 59 yards, 4:07.
- MRST – Tristan Shannon 59-yard run (Samer Layous kick), 7:11. Red Foxes 10–0. Drive: 4 plays, 68 yards, 2:35.
- MRST – Connor Hulstein 17-yard pass from Sonny Mannino (Samer Layous kick), 0:18. Red Foxes 17–0. Drive: 9 plays, 50 yards, 3:56.

Second quarter

- NH – Evan Chieca 5-yard pass from AJ Duffy (Liam Quigley kick), 11:27. Red Foxes 17–7. Drive: 9 plays, 72 yards, 3:44.

Third quarter

- MRST – Sonny Mannino 4-yard run (Samer Layous kick), 2:42. Red Foxes 24–7. Drive: 2 plays, 13 yards, 0:42.

Fourth quarter

- NH – Logan Schmidt 21-yard pass from AJ Duffy (Liam Quigley kick), 11:13. Red Foxes 24–14. Drive: 4 plays, 41 yards, 1:19.
- MRST – Rene Barber 0-yard fumble return (Samer Layous kick), 0:44. Red Foxes 31–14.

Statistics	NH	MRST
First downs	22	17
Total yards	396	305
Rushes–yards	19–18	44–228
Passing yards	377	75
Passing: Comp–Att–Int	31–55–0	11–20–0
Turnovers	4	1
Time of possession	26:53	33:07

Team	Category	Player	Statistics
New Haven	Passing	AJ Duffy	31/55, 377 yards, 2 TD, INT
New Haven	Rushing	Brian Thomas	8 carries, 16 yards
New Haven	Receiving	Joshua Tracey	9 receptions, 145 yards
Marist	Passing	Sonny Mannino	11/20, 75 yards, TD
Marist	Rushing	Sonny Mannino	21 carries, 109 yards, TD
Marist	Receiving	Connor Hulstein	2 receptions, 27 yards, TD

=== Bucknell ===
Bucknell Bison (0-1) vs. Marist Red Foxes (1-0) – Game summary

Quarter	1	2	3	4	Total
Bison	-	-	-	-	0
Red Foxes	-	-	-	-	0

at Leonidoff Field • Poughkeepsie, NY

- Date: September 6
- Game time: 1:00 p.m. EDT
- TV announcers (ESPN+): Geoff Brault (play-by-play), Steve Eggink (analyst), William Rosen (sideline)

Statistics	BUCK	MRST
First downs		
Total yards		
Rushing yards		
Passing yards		
Passing: Comp–Att–Int		
Time of possession		

Team	Category	Player	Statistics
Bucknell	Passing		
Bucknell	Rushing		
Bucknell	Receiving		
Marist	Passing		
Marist	Rushing		
Marist	Receiving		

=== at Wagner ===
Marist Red Foxes (1-1) vs. Wagner Seahawks (0-2) – Game summary

Quarter	1	2	3	4	Total
Red Foxes	-	-	-	-	0
Seahawks	-	-	-	-	0

at Wagner College Stadium • New York City, NY

- Date: September 13
- Game time: 1:00 PM EDT
- TV announcers (NEC Front Row): Marc Ernay (play-by-play) and Craig D'Amico (analyst)

Statistics	MRST	WAG
First downs		
Total yards		
Rushing yards		
Passing yards		
Passing: Comp–Att–Int		
Time of possession		

Team	Category	Player	Statistics
Marist	Passing		
Marist	Rushing		
Marist	Receiving		
Wagner	Passing		
Wagner	Rushing		
Wagner	Receiving		

=== at Butler ===
Marist Red Foxes (2-1) vs. Butler Bulldogs (2-2) – Game summary

Quarter	1	2	3	4	Total
Red Foxes	0	7	7	14	28
Bulldogs	7	7	3	14	31

at Bud and Jackie Sellick Bowl • Indianapolis, IN

- Date: Saturday, September 27, 2025
- Game time: 1:00 p.m. EDT
- Game weather: Sunny • Temperature: 82 °F (28 °C) • Wind: NW at 3 miles per hour (4.8 km/h)
- Game attendance: 4,167
- Referee: Tyler Downs
- TV announcers (FloCollege): Greg Rakestraw (play-by-play) & Andrew Mild (analyst)

Game information

First Quarter

- (1:24) BUT – Cameron Heald 6-yard pass from Reagan Andrew, Ryan Short kick (Drive: 3 plays, 6 yards, 1:23; Butler 7–0)

Second Quarter

- (12:31) MRST – Matt Bonczek 40-yard fumble return, Samer Layous kick (Tied 7–7)
- (4:28) BUT – Griffin Caldwell 56-yard run, Ryan Short kick (Drive: 7 plays, 91 yards, 3:58; Butler 14–7)

Third Quarter

- (10:02) BUT – Ryan Short 26-yard field goal (Drive: 7 plays, 25 yards, 3:30; Butler 17–7)
- (1:40) MRST – Connor Hulstein 17-yard pass from Patrick Grusser, Samer Layous kick (Drive: 9 plays, 81 yards, 2:52; Butler 17–14)

Fourth Quarter

- (13:20) MRST – Devin Kennedy 27-yard pass from Sonny Mannino, Samer Layous kick (Drive: 4 plays, 35 yards, 1:34; Marist 21–17)
- (9:49) BUT – Brady Preston 1-yard pass from Reagan Andrew, Ryan Short kick (Drive: 6 plays, 74 yards, 3:25; Butler 24–21)
- (3:11) MRST – Lance Martinez 35-yard pass from Sonny Mannino, Samer Layous kick (Drive: 4 plays, 40 yards, 1:21; Marist 28–24)
- (1:47) BUT – Archie Cox 48-yard pass from Reagan Andrew, Ryan Short kick (Drive: 5 plays, 69 yards, 1:19; Butler 31–28)

Statistics	MRST	BUT
First downs	13	15
Total yards	240	376
Rushing yards	21	225
Passing yards	219	151
Passing: Comp–Att–Int	26–38–1	17–27–0
Time of possession	26:22	33:38

Team	Category	Player	Statistics
Marist	Passing	Sonny Mannino	23/35, 178 yards, 2 TD, INT
Marist	Rushing	Carter James	6 carries, 18 yards
Marist	Receiving	Connor Hulstein	4 receptions, 58 yards, TD
Butler	Passing	Reagan Andrew	17/27, 151 yards, 3 TD
Butler	Rushing	Reagan Andrew	14 carries, 57 yards
Butler	Receiving	Ethan Loss	5 receptions, 59 yards

=== San Diego ===
San Diego Toreros (3-2) vs. Marist Red Foxes (2-2) – Game summary

Quarter	1	2	3	4	Total
Toreros	7	0	0	7	14
Red Foxes	6	0	6	7	19

at Leonidoff Field • Poughkeepsie, NY

- Date: October 4
- Game time: 12:00 p.m. EDT
- TV announcers (ESPN+): Geoff Brault (play-by-play), Steve Eggink (analyst) and William Rosen (sideline)

Statistics	USD	MRST
First downs		
Total yards		
Rushing yards		
Passing yards		
Passing: Comp–Att–Int		
Time of possession		

Team	Category	Player	Statistics
San Diego	Passing		
San Diego	Rushing		
San Diego	Receiving		
Marist	Passing		
Marist	Rushing		
Marist	Receiving		

=== at Penn ===
Marist Red Foxes (3-2) vs. Penn Quakers (2-1) – Game summary

Quarter	1	2	3	4	Total
Red Foxes	3	0	0	6	9
Quakers	7	7	0	14	28

at Franklin Field • Philadelphia, PA

- Date: October 10
- Game time: 7:00 PM EDT
- Game weather: Cloudy • Temperature: 60 °F (16 °C) • Wind: SE at 6 miles per hour (9.7 km/h)
- Game attendance: 1,164
- Referee: Alexander Randolph
- TV announcers (ESPN+): Joe Tordy (play-by-play) and Joe Valerio (analyst)

Game information

First Quarter

- (7:55) MRST – Samer Layous 43-yard field goal (Drive: 11 plays, 51 yards, 7:05; Marist 3–0)
- (4:53) PENN – Jared Richardson 21-yard pass from Liam O'Brien, Mason Walters kick (Drive: 7 plays, 65 yards, 3:02; Penn 7–3)

Second Quarter

- (5:49) PENN – Liam O'Brien 21-yard run, Mason Walters kick (Drive: 6 plays, 57 yards, 2:47; Penn 14–3)

Third Quarter

No scoring plays

Fourth Quarter

- (11:45) PENN – Jared Richardson 11-yard pass from Liam O'Brien, Mason Walters kick (Drive: 7 plays, 46 yards, 3:11; Penn 21–3)
- (10:28) MRST – Santino Correa 29-yard pass from Jeremy Decaro (Drive: 3 plays, 65 yards, 1:17; Penn 21–9)
- (3:03) PENN – Julien Stokes 1-yard run, Mason Walters kick (Drive: 3 plays, 25 yards, 1:31; Penn 28–9)

Statistics	MRST	PENN
First downs	15	22
Total yards	250	463
Rushing yards	98	128
Passing yards	152	335
Passing: Comp–Att–Int	16–25–0	26–40–0
Time of possession	29:47	30:13

Team	Category	Player	Statistics
Marist	Passing	Will O'Dell	14/22, 118 yards
Marist	Rushing	Will O'Dell	9 carries, 53 yards
Marist	Receiving	Reed Shumpert	6 receptions, 55 yards
Penn	Passing	Liam O'Brien	26/40, 335 yards, 2 TD
Penn	Rushing	Julien Stokes	13 carries, 59 yards, TD
Penn	Receiving	Jared Richardson	15 receptions, 190 yards, 2 TD

=== at Morehead State ===
Marist Red Foxes (3-3) vs. Morehead State Eagles (2-5) – Game summary

Quarter	1	2	3	4	Total
Red Foxes	-	-	-	-	0
Eagles	-	-	-	-	0

at Phil Simms Stadium • Morehead, KY

- Date: October 18
- Game time: 2:00 PM EDT
- TV announcers (ESPN+): Jared Stacy (play-by-play) and Randy Stacy (analyst)

Statistics	MRST	MORE
First downs		
Total yards		
Rushing yards		
Passing yards		
Passing: Comp–Att–Int		
Time of possession		

Team	Category	Player	Statistics
Marist	Passing		
Marist	Rushing		
Marist	Receiving		
Morehead State	Passing		
Morehead State	Rushing		
Morehead State	Receiving		

=== Drake ===
Drake Bulldogs (4-2) vs. Marist Red Foxes (3-4) – Game summary

Quarter	1	2	3	4	Total
Bulldogs	-	-	-	-	0
Red Foxes	-	-	-	-	0

at Leonidoff Field • Poughkeepsie, NY

- Date: October 25
- Game time: 12:00 p.m. EDT
- TV: ESPN+

Statistics	DRKE	MRST
First downs		
Total yards		
Rushing yards		
Passing yards		
Passing: Comp–Att–Int		
Time of possession		

Team	Category	Player	Statistics
Drake	Passing		
Drake	Rushing		
Drake	Receiving		
Marist	Passing		
Marist	Rushing		
Marist	Receiving		

=== at St. Thomas (MN) ===
Marist Red Foxes (3-5) vs. St. Thomas Tommies (5-3) – Game summary

Quarter	1	2	3	4	Total
Red Foxes	-	-	-	-	0
Tommies	-	-	-	-	0

at O'Shaughnessy Stadium • Saint Paul, MN

- Date: November 1
- Game time: 1:00 PM CDT

Statistics	MRST	STMN
First downs		
Total yards		
Rushing yards		
Passing yards		
Passing: Comp–Att–Int		
Time of possession		

Team	Category	Player	Statistics
Marist	Passing		
Marist	Rushing		
Marist	Receiving		
St. Thomas (MN)	Passing		
St. Thomas (MN)	Rushing		
St. Thomas (MN)	Receiving		

=== Stetson ===
Stetson Hatters (3-6) vs. Marist Red Foxes (3-6) – Game summary

Quarter	1	2	3	4	Total
Hatters	0	7	0	6	13
Red Foxes	10	28	3	0	41

at Leonidoff Field • Poughkeepsie, NY

- Date: November 8
- Game time: 1:00 PM EST
- Game attendance: 983
- TV: ESPN+

Game information

First Quarter

- (2:24) MRST – Samer Layous 23-yard field goal (Drive: 9 plays, 80 yards, 3:59; Marist 3–0)
- (1:13) MRST – Jace Williamson 45 Yd Interception Return (Samer Layous Kick) (Drive: 3 plays, 2 yards, 1:00; Marist 10–0)

Second Quarter

- (13:58) MRST – Connor Hulstein 78 Yd pass from Sonny Mannino (Samer Layous Kick) (Drive: 2 plays, 79 yards, 0:50; Marist 17–0)
- (8:11) MRST – Sonny Mannino 49 Yd run (Samer Layous Kick) (Drive: 3 plays, 43 yards, 1:12; Marist 24–0)
- (7:12) MRST – Lance Martinez 36 Yd pass from Sonny Mannino (Samer Layous Kick) (Drive: 1 play, 36 yards, 0:07; Marist 31–0)
- (1:58) MRST – Sonny Mannino 3 Yd run (Samer Layous Kick) (Drive: 5 plays, 35 yards, 2:46; Marist 38–0)
- (0:02) STET – Beau Bankston 7 Yd pass from Kael Alexander (Daniel Holbrook Kick) (Drive: 11 plays, 61 yards, 1:47; Marist 38–7)

Third Quarter

- (10:59) MRST − Samer Layous 46-yard field goal (Drive: 7 plays, 36 yards, 3:56; Marist 41−7)

Fourth Quarter

(0:48) STET − Cayden Betts 2 Yd run (Daniel Holbrook PAT failed) (Drive: 14 plays, 80 yards, 7:35; Marist 41−13)

Statistics	STET	MRST
First downs	15	17
Total yards	276	393
Rushing yards	150	206
Passing yards	126	187
Passing: Comp–Att–Int	12–27–3	8–16–0
Time of possession	31:09	28:51

Team	Category	Player	Statistics
Stetson	Passing	Kael Alexander	7/19, 59 yards, 1 TD, 1 INT
Stetson	Rushing	Michael Dempsey	13 carries, 81 yards
Stetson	Receiving	Dylan Redmon	3 receptions, 48 yards
Marist	Passing	Sonny Mannino	8/15, 187 yards, 2 TDs
Marist	Rushing	Carter James	10 carries, 69 yards
Marist	Receiving	Connor Hulstein	2 receptions, 92 yards, 1 TD

=== Davidson ===
Davidson Wildcats (0-0) vs. Marist Red Foxes (0-0) – Game summary

Quarter	1	2	3	4	Total
Wildcats	-	-	-	-	0
Red Foxes	-	-	-	-	0

at Leonidoff Field • Poughkeepsie, NY

- Date: November 15
- Game time: 12:00 PM EST
- TV: ESPN+

Statistics	DAV	MRST
First downs		
Total yards		
Rushing yards		
Passing yards		
Passing: Comp–Att–Int		
Time of possession		

Team	Category	Player	Statistics
Davidson	Passing		
Davidson	Rushing		
Davidson	Receiving		
Marist	Passing		
Marist	Rushing		
Marist	Receiving		

=== at Presbyterian ===
Marist Red Foxes (0-0) vs. Presbyterian Blue Hose (0-0) – Game summary

Quarter	1	2	3	4	Total
Red Foxes	-	-	-	-	0
Blue Hose	-	-	-	-	0

at Bailey Memorial Stadium • Clinton, SC

- Date: November 22
- Game time: 1:00 PM EST

Statistics	MRST	PRES
First downs		
Total yards		
Rushing yards		
Passing yards		
Passing: Comp–Att–Int		
Time of possession		

Team	Category	Player	Statistics
Marist	Passing		
Marist	Rushing		
Marist	Receiving		
Presbyterian	Passing		
Presbyterian	Rushing		
Presbyterian	Receiving		
