= 2025 Morehead State Eagles football team =

American college football season

2025 Morehead State Eagles football
- Conference: Pioneer Football League
- Record: 6–6 (4–4 PFL)
- Head coach: Jason Woodman (2nd season)
- Defensive coordinator: Wil Truelove (2nd season)
- Home stadium: Phil Simms Stadium

2025 Pioneer Football League standings
	Conf.			Overall
Team	W		L	W		L
Drake $^	7	–	1	8	–	4
Presbyterian	6	–	2	10	–	2
San Diego	6	–	2	8	–	4
St. Thomas (MN)	5	–	3	7	–	5
Dayton	5	–	3	7	–	4
Morehead State	4	–	4	6	–	6
Butler	4	–	4	6	–	6
Marist	3	–	5	5	–	7
Stetson	2	–	6	3	–	9
Davidson	1	–	7	2	–	10
Valparaiso	1	–	7	2	–	10
$ – Conference champion; ^ – FCS playoff participant; Rankings from STATS Poll

The 2025 Morehead State Eagles football team represented Morehead State University as a member of the Pioneer Football League (PFL) during the 2025 NCAA Division I FCS football season. The Eagles were led by second-year head coach Jason Woodman and played home games at Phil Simms Stadium in Morehead, Kentucky, which was renamed from Jayne Stadium on October 18, prior to the Eagles' homecoming game.

After leading the Eagles to a 7–5 record in 2024, which was their best season since 2021, Woodman was signed to a three-year contract extension in December 2024.

The team concluded spring practices with their annual spring game on April 17.

== Schedule ==
The 2025 schedule was officially released on April 1, 2025. Morehead State opened the season against Allen on August 30, marking the first-ever meeting between the two programs.

Date	Time	Opponent	Site	TV	Result	Attendance
August 30	6:00 pm	Allen*	Jayne Stadium; Morehead, KY	ESPN+	W 38–31	5,897
September 6	7:00 pm	at No. 7 Illinois State*	Hancock Stadium; Normal, IL	ESPN+	L 13–41	9,671
September 13	7:00 pm	at No. 22 Austin Peay*	Fortera Stadium; Clarksville, TN	ESPN+	L 7–56	7,152
September 20	6:00 pm	Kentucky Christian*	Jayne Stadium; Morehead, KY	ESPN+	W 45–28	7,428
September 27	1:00 pm	at No. 25 Presbyterian	Bailey Memorial Stadium; Clinton, SC	ESPN+	L 0–41	3,661
October 4	1:00 pm	Dayton	Jayne Stadium; Morehead, KY	ESPN+	L 28–35	5,028
October 11	1:00 pm	at Stetson	Spec Martin Stadium; DeLand, FL	ESPN+	L 14–21	1,490
October 18	2:00 pm	Marist^{†}	Phil Simms Stadium; Morehead, KY	ESPN+	W 23–21	8,245
October 25	1:00 pm	at Valparaiso	Brown Field; Valparaiso, IN	ESPN+	W 17–13	1,897
November 1	1:00 pm	Davidson	Phil Simms Stadium; Morehead, KY	ESPN+	W 28–24	3,907
November 8	1:00 pm	Butler	Phil Simms Stadium; Morehead, KY	ESPN+	W 31–30	4,108
November 22	2:00 pm	at Drake	Drake Stadium; Des Moines, IA	ESPN+	L 10–17	2,267
*Non-conference game; ^{†}Homecoming; Rankings from STATS Poll released prior to the game; All times are in Eastern time

== Game summaries ==
=== Allen (DII) ===
Allen Yellow Jackets (DII) (0-0) vs. Morehead State Eagles (0-0) – Game summary

Quarter	1	2	3	4	Total
Yellow Jackets (DII)	7	7	7	10	31
Eagles	14	10	7	7	38

at Jayne Stadium • Morehead, KY

- Date: August 30
- Game time: 6:00 PM EDT
- Game weather: Sunny • Temperature: 75 °F (24 °C) • Wind: NE at 10 miles per hour (16 km/h)
- Game attendance: 5,897
- Referee: Coady Adams
- TV: ESPN+

Game information

First Quarter

- (12:56) MOR – Anthony Ice 44-yard pass from Carter Cravens, Jordan Price kick (Drive: 4 plays, 75 yards, 1:57; Morehead State 7–0)
- (4:17) ALN – Mike Bowman 7-yard pass from Jamir Dismukes, Sam Herman kick (Drive: 9 plays, 81 yards, 3:42; Tied 7–7)
- (1:25) MOR – Craig Cunningham 31-yard run, Jordan Price kick (Drive: 5 plays, 70 yards, 2:47; Morehead State 14–7)

Second Quarter

- (2:32) MOR – Carter Cravens 8-yard run, Jordan Price kick (Drive: 7 plays, 69 yards, 4:43; Morehead State 21–7)
- (0:34) ALN – Fabian Duncan 1-yard run, Sam Herman kick (Drive: 9 plays, 79 yards, 1:52; Morehead State 21–14)
- (0:00) MOR – Jordan Price 21-yard field goal (Drive: 6 plays, 58 yards, 0:30; Morehead State 24–14)

Third Quarter

- (11:20) ALN – Nanders Lawrence 11-yard pass from Jamir Dismukes, Sam Herman kick (Drive: 8 plays, 83 yards, 3:32; Morehead State 24–21)
- (7:37) MOR – Carter Cravens 14-yard run, Jordan Price kick (Drive: 6 plays, 35 yards, 1:32; Morehead State 31–21)

Fourth Quarter

- (12:01) ALN – Sam Herman 32-yard field goal (Drive: 9 plays, 36 yards, 3:47; Morehead State 31–24)
- (11:46) MOR – Sidney Webb 83-yard kickoff return, Jordan Price kick (Morehead State 38–24)
- (5:12) ALN – Fabian Duncan 1-yard run, Sam Herman kick (Drive: 7 plays, 76 yards, 3:03; Morehead State 38–31)

Statistics	ALN	MORE
First downs	31	17
Total yards	416	414
Rushing yards	107	195
Passing yards	309	219
Passing: Comp–Att–Int	26–38–0	16–21–0
Time of possession	31:12	28:48

Team	Category	Player	Statistics
Allen	Passing	Jamir Dismukes	26/38, 309 yards, 2 TD
Allen	Rushing	Fabian Duncan	15 carries, 64 yards, 2 TD
Allen	Receiving	Nanders Lawrence	9 receptions, 104 yards, TD
Morehead State	Passing	Carter Cravens	16/21, 219 yards, TD
Morehead State	Rushing	Craig Cunningham	12 carries, 94 yards, TD
Morehead State	Receiving	Ryan Upp	8 receptions, 90 yards

=== at No. 7 Illinois State ===
Morehead State Eagles (1-0) vs. No. 7 Illinois State Redbirds (0-1) – Game summary

Quarter	1	2	3	4	Total
Eagles	6	0	0	7	13
No. 7 Redbirds	3	14	10	14	41

at Hancock Stadium • Normal, IL

- Date: September 6
- Game time: 6:00 PM CDT
- Game weather: Sunny • Temperature: 68 °F (20 °C) • Wind: NW at 11 miles per hour (18 km/h)
- Game attendance: 9,671
- Referee: Carl Chapman
- TV announcers (ESPN+): Kurt Pegler (play-by-play), Clay Harbor (analyst), Genna Rose (sideline)

Game information

First quarter

- MSU – Craig Cunningham 1–yard run (), 7:02. Eagles 6–0. Drive: 14 plays, 86 yards, 7:53.
- ILS – Matt Maldonado 27–yard field goal, 1:58. Eagles 6–3. Drive: 11 plays, 33 yards, 3:25.

Second quarter

- ILS – Daniel Sobkowicz 25–yard pass from Beckham Pellant (Maldonado kick), 11:53. Redbirds 10–6. Drive: 7 plays, 75 yards, 02:52.
- ILS – Tommy Rittenhouse 1–yard run (Maldonado kick), 6:47. Redbirds 17–6. Drive: 3 plays, 80 yards, 1:03.

Third quarter

- ILS – Maldonado 45–yard field goal, 8:20. Redbirds 20–6. Drive: 6 plays, 14 yards, 2:12.
- ILS – Luke Mailander 32–yard pass from Rittenhouse (Maldonado kick), 6:29. Redbirds 27–6. Drive: 3 plays, 29 yards, 1:11.

Fourth quarter

- MSU – Montez Green 14–yard pass from Carter Cravens (Jordan Price kick), 13:28. Redbirds 27–13. Drive: 13 plays, 84 yards, 7:54.
- ILS – Nick True 3–yard pass from Rittenhouse (Maldonado kick), 4:28. Redbirds 34–13. Drive: 8 plays, 71 yards, 3:57.
- ILS – Cam Wilson 27–yard fumble recovery (Maldonado kick), 4:05. Redbirds 41–13.

Statistics	MORE	ILST
First downs	20	21
Total yards	234	393
Rushing yards	100	223
Passing yards	134	170
Passing: Comp–Att–Int	14–28–1	13–23–1
Time of possession	35:26	24:34

Team	Category	Player	Statistics
Morehead State	Passing	Carter Cravens	14/28, 134 yards, 1 TD, 1 INT
Morehead State	Rushing	Isaac Stopke	13 carries, 86 yards
Morehead State	Receiving	Ryan Upp	7 receptions, 69 yards
Illinois State	Passing	Tommy Rittenhouse	8/13, 81 yards, 2 TD, INT
Illinois State	Rushing	Victor Dawson	10 carries, 88 yards
Illinois State	Receiving	Daniel Sobkowicz	5 receptions, 87 yards, TD

=== at No. 22 Austin Peay ===
Morehead State Eagles (1-1) vs. No. 22 Austin Peay Governors (1-1) – Game summary

Quarter	1	2	3	4	Total
Eagles	-	-	-	-	0
No. 22 Governors	-	-	-	-	0

at Fortera Stadium • Clarksville, TN

- Date: September 13
- Game time: 6:00 PM CDT
- TV announcers (ESPN+): Barry Gresham (play-by-play) and Ethan Schmidt (analyst)

Statistics	MORE	APSU
First downs		
Total yards		
Rushing yards		
Passing yards		
Passing: Comp–Att–Int		
Time of possession		

Team	Category	Player	Statistics
Morehead State	Passing		
Morehead State	Rushing		
Morehead State	Receiving		
Austin Peay	Passing		
Austin Peay	Rushing		
Austin Peay	Receiving		

=== Kentucky Christian (NAIA) ===
Kentucky Christian Knights (NAIA) (1-1) vs. Morehead State Eagles (1-2) – Game summary

Quarter	1	2	3	4	Total
Knights (NAIA)	0	14	7	7	28
Eagles	10	21	14	0	45

at Jayne Stadium • Morehead, KY

- Date: September 20
- Game time: 6:00 PM EDT
- Game weather: Sunny • Temperature: 80 °F (27 °C) • Wind: W at 5 miles per hour (8.0 km/h)
- Game attendance: 7,428
- Referee: Andrew Ison
- TV: ESPN+

Game information

First Quarter

- (12:31) MORE – Montez Green 34-yard pass from Carter Cravens, Jordan Price kick (Drive: 4 plays, 69 yards, 2:21; Morehead State 7–0)
- (3:52) MORE – Jordan Price 25-yard field goal (Drive: 13 plays, 74 yards, 7:00; Morehead State 10–0)

Second Quarter

- (14:48) KYCH – Jovari Gamble 75-yard run, Christian Altizer kick (Drive: 2 plays, 85 yards, 0:35; Morehead State 10–7)
- (8:34) MORE – Isaac Stopke 4-yard run, Jordan Price kick (Drive: 10 plays, 71 yards, 6:04; Morehead State 17–7)
- (5:21) MORE – Anthony Ice 38-yard pass from Carter Cravens, Jordan Price kick (Drive: 3 plays, 69 yards, 0:48; Morehead State 24–7)
- (1:53) MORE – Ryan Upp 39-yard pass from Carter Cravens, Jordan Price kick (Drive: 5 plays, 70 yards, 1:53; Morehead State 31–7)
- (0:00) KYCH – Jason Cobb 10-yard pass from Jackson Wasik, Christian Altizer kick (Drive: 9 plays, 68 yards, 1:48; Morehead State 31–14)

Third Quarter

- (6:19) MORE – Carter Cravens 5-yard run, Jordan Price kick (Drive: 7 plays, 80 yards, 4:25; Morehead State 38–14)
- (3:13) KYCH – Jason Cobb 4-yard pass from Jackson Wasik, Christian Altizer kick (Drive: 7 plays, 75 yards, 3:06; Morehead State 38–21)
- (0:10) MORE – Ryan Upp 39-yard pass from Carter Cravens, Jordan Price kick (Drive: 5 plays, 73 yards, 2:58; Morehead State 45–21)

Fourth Quarter

- (3:37) KYCH – Jason Cobb 14-yard pass from Jackson Wasik, Christian Altizer kick (Drive: 2 plays, 80 yards, 0:29; Morehead State 45–28)

Statistics	KYCH	MORE
First downs	17	30
Total yards	353	600
Rushing yards	101	289
Passing yards	252	311
Passing: Comp–Att–Int	16–27–0	18–23–0
Time of possession	19:48	40:12

Team	Category	Player	Statistics
Kentucky Christian	Passing	Jackson Wasik	15/25, 243 yards, 3 TD
Kentucky Christian	Rushing	Jovari Gamble	7 carries, 93 yards, TD
Kentucky Christian	Receiving	Calvin Brown	6 receptions, 90 yards
Morehead State	Passing	Carter Cravens	18/23, 311 yards, 4 TD
Morehead State	Rushing	Craig Cunningham	20 carries, 138 yards
Morehead State	Receiving	Ryan Upp	7 receptions, 139 yards, 2 TD

=== at No. 25 Presbyterian ===
Morehead State Eagles (2-2) vs. No. 25 Presbyterian Blue Hose (4-0) – Game summary

Quarter	1	2	3	4	Total
Eagles	0	0	0	0	0
No. 25 Blue Hose	14	21	6	0	41

at Bailey Memorial Stadium • Clinton, SC

- Date: September 27
- Game time: 1:00 PM EDT
- Game weather: Rain • Temperature: 73 °F (23 °C) • Wind: NW at 1 mile per hour (1.6 km/h)
- Game attendance: 3,661
- Referee: Brian Hilpisch
- TV: ESPN+

Game information

First Quarter

- (12:33) PC – Zach Switzer 1-yard pass from Collin Hurst, Jett Jackson kick (Drive: 5 plays, 40 yards, 2:23; Presbyterian 7–0)
- (11:37) PC – Dominic Kibby 10-yard pass from Collin Hurst, Jett Jackson kick (Drive: 2 plays, 31 yards, 0:41; Presbyterian 14–0)

Second Quarter

- (14:27) PC – Justin Montgomery 14-yard run, Jett Jackson kick (Drive: 6 plays, 59 yards, 2:38; Presbyterian 21–0)
- (9:32) PC – Zach Switzer 66-yard run, Jett Jackson kick (Drive: 1 play, 66 yards, 0:12; Presbyterian 28–0)
- (1:48) PC – Zach Switzer 79-yard run, Jett Jackson kick (Drive: 2 plays, 77 yards, 0:56; Presbyterian 35–0)

Third Quarter

- (7:00) PC – Collin Hurst 12-yard run (Drive: 5 plays, 47 yards, 2:10; Presbyterian 41–0)

Fourth Quarter

No scoring plays

Statistics	MORE	PRES
First downs	18	20
Total yards	277	445
Rushing yards	123	303
Passing yards	154	142
Passing: Comp–Att–Int	15–35–3	12–19–0
Time of possession	36:25	23:35

Team	Category	Player	Statistics
Morehead State	Passing	Carter Cravens	10/24, 120 yards, 2 INT
Morehead State	Rushing	Bryce Patterson	3 carries, 37 yards
Morehead State	Receiving	Anthony Ice	3 receptions, 68 yards
Presbyterian	Passing	Collin Hurst	11/17, 137 yards, 2 TD
Presbyterian	Rushing	Zach Switzer	6 carries, 158 yards, 2 TD
Presbyterian	Receiving	Cincere Gill	4 receptions, 62 yards

=== Dayton ===
Dayton Flyers (3-1) vs. Morehead State Eagles (2-3) – Game summary

Quarter	1	2	3	4	Total
Flyers	7	21	0	7	35
Eagles	0	0	28	0	28

at Jayne Stadium • Morehead, KY

- Date: October 4
- Game time: 1:00 PM EDT
- TV announcers (ESPN+): Jared Stacy (play-by-play) and Mark Ledford (analyst)

Statistics	DAY	MORE
First downs		
Total yards		
Rushing yards		
Passing yards		
Passing: Comp–Att–Int		
Time of possession		

Team	Category	Player	Statistics
Dayton	Passing		
Dayton	Rushing		
Dayton	Receiving		
Morehead State	Passing		
Morehead State	Rushing		
Morehead State	Receiving		

=== at Stetson ===
Morehead State Eagles (2-4) vs. Stetson Hatters (2-4) – Game summary

Quarter	1	2	3	4	Total
Eagles	0	0	0	14	14
Hatters	7	7	0	7	21

at Spec Martin Stadium • DeLand, FL

- Date: October 11
- Game time: 1:00 PM EDT
- TV: ESPN+

Statistics	MORE	STET
First downs		
Total yards		
Rushing yards		
Passing yards		
Passing: Comp–Att–Int		
Time of possession		

Team	Category	Player	Statistics
Morehead State	Passing		
Morehead State	Rushing		
Morehead State	Receiving		
Stetson	Passing		
Stetson	Rushing		
Stetson	Receiving		

=== Marist ===
Marist Red Foxes (3-3) vs. Morehead State Eagles (2-5) – Game summary

Quarter	1	2	3	4	Total
Red Foxes	-	-	-	-	0
Eagles	-	-	-	-	0

at Phil Simms Stadium • Morehead, KY

- Date: October 18
- Game time: 2:00 PM EDT
- TV announcers (ESPN+): Jared Stacy (play-by-play) and Randy Stacy (analyst)

Statistics	MRST	MORE
First downs		
Total yards		
Rushing yards		
Passing yards		
Passing: Comp–Att–Int		
Time of possession		

Team	Category	Player	Statistics
Marist	Passing		
Marist	Rushing		
Marist	Receiving		
Morehead State	Passing		
Morehead State	Rushing		
Morehead State	Receiving		

=== at Valparaiso ===
Morehead State Eagles (3-5) vs. Valparaiso Beacons (1-6) – Game summary

Quarter	1	2	3	4	Total
Eagles	-	-	-	-	0
Beacons	-	-	-	-	0

at Brown Field • Valparaiso, IN

- Date: October 25
- Game time: 12:00 PM CDT

Statistics	MORE	VAL
First downs		
Total yards		
Rushing yards		
Passing yards		
Passing: Comp–Att–Int		
Time of possession		

Team	Category	Player	Statistics
Morehead State	Passing		
Morehead State	Rushing		
Morehead State	Receiving		
Valparaiso	Passing		
Valparaiso	Rushing		
Valparaiso	Receiving		

=== Davidson ===
Davidson Wildcats (1-7) vs. Morehead State Eagles (4-5) – Game summary

Quarter	1	2	3	4	Total
Wildcats	-	-	-	-	0
Eagles	-	-	-	-	0

at Phil Simms Stadium • Morehead, KY

- Date: November 1
- Game time: 1:00 PM EDT

Statistics	DAV	MORE
First downs		
Total yards		
Rushing yards		
Passing yards		
Passing: Comp–Att–Int		
Time of possession		

Team	Category	Player	Statistics
Davidson	Passing		
Davidson	Rushing		
Davidson	Receiving		
Morehead State	Passing		
Morehead State	Rushing		
Morehead State	Receiving		

=== Butler ===
Butler Bulldogs (5-4) vs. Morehead State Eagles (5-5) – Game summary

Quarter	1	2	3	4	Total
Bulldogs	14	10	3	3	30
Eagles	7	10	7	7	31

at Phil Simms Stadium • Morehead, KY

- Date: November 8
- Game time: 1:00 PM EST
- Game weather: Sunny • Temperature: 62 °F (17 °C) • Wind: W at 10 miles per hour (16 km/h)
- Game attendance: 4,108
- Referee: Bradley Eiras
- TV announcers (ESPN+): Jared Stacy (play-by-play) and Mark Ledford (analyst)

Game information

First Quarter

- (10:08) MORE – Isaac Stopke 4-yard run, Jordan Price kick (Drive: 9 plays, 77 yards, 4:46; Morehead State 7–0)
- (9:52) BUT – Ethan Loss 100-yard kickoff return, Ryan Short kick (Tied 7–7)
- (2:22) BUT – Charlie Spegal 1-yard run, Ryan Short kick (Drive: 11 plays, 74 yards, 5:36; Butler 14–7)

Second Quarter

- (12:56) MORE – Thomas Schwartz V 33-yard field goal (Drive: 9 plays, 57 yards, 4:19; Butler 14–10)
- (6:40) BUT – Ethan Loss 2-yard run, Ryan Short kick (Drive: 5 plays, 57 yards, 1:52; Butler 21–10)
- (5:38) MORE – Ryan Upp 57-yard pass from Carter Cravens, Jordan Price kick (Drive: 2 plays, 65 yards, 0:50; Butler 21–17)
- (0:00) BUT – Ryan Short 45-yard field goal (Drive: 10 plays, 52 yards, 1:53; Butler 24–17)

Third Quarter

- (11:34) MORE – Jackson Lanier 3-yard run, Jordan Price kick (Drive: 4 plays, 32 yards, 1:11; Tied 24–24)
- (0:06) BUT – Ryan Short 44-yard field goal (Drive: 12 plays, 21 yards, 6:48; Butler 27–24)

Fourth Quarter

- (3:33) BUT – Ryan Short 43-yard field goal (Drive: 12 plays, 53 yards, 7:23; Butler 30–24)
- (0:52) MORE – Ryan Upp 7-yard pass from Carter Cravens, Jordan Price kick (Drive: 14 plays, 75 yards, 2:41; Morehead State 31–30)

Statistics	BUT	MORE
First downs	22	20
Total yards	330	344
Rushing yards	195	46
Passing yards	135	298
Passing: Comp–Att–Int	17–27–2	23–31–0
Time of possession	34:24	25:36

Team	Category	Player	Statistics
Butler	Passing	Reagan Andrew	13/20, 103 yards, 2 INT
Butler	Rushing	Reagan Andrew	16 carries, 74 yards
Butler	Receiving	Ethan Loss	7 receptions, 72 yards
Morehead State	Passing	Carter Cravens	23/31, 298 yards, 2 TD
Morehead State	Rushing	Isaac Stopke	8 carries, 37 yards
Morehead State	Receiving	Ryan Upp	9 receptions, 154 yards, 2 TD

=== at Drake ===
Morehead State Eagles (6-5) vs. Drake Bulldogs (0-0) – Game summary

Quarter	1	2	3	4	Total
Eagles	-	-	-	-	0
Bulldogs	-	-	-	-	0

at Drake Stadium • Des Moines, IA

- Date: November 22
- Game time: 1:00 PM CST
- TV: ESPN+

Statistics	MORE	DRKE
First downs		
Total yards		
Rushing yards		
Passing yards		
Passing: Comp–Att–Int		
Time of possession		

Team	Category	Player	Statistics
Morehead State	Passing		
Morehead State	Rushing		
Morehead State	Receiving		
Drake	Passing		
Drake	Rushing		
Drake	Receiving		
