= Michael Jasper =

American football player and coach (born 1986)

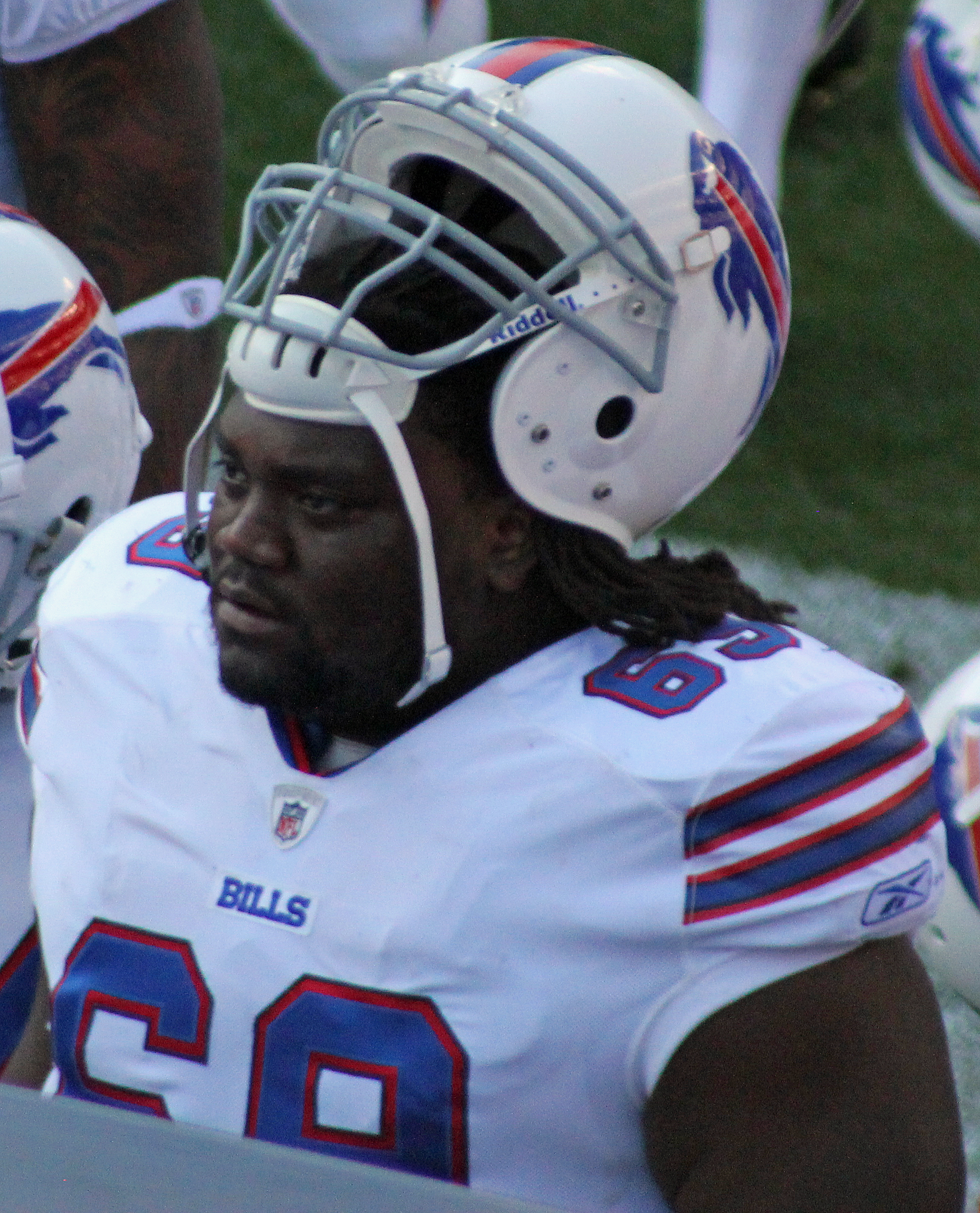
- Jasper with the Buffalo Bills in 2011

Stetson Hatters
- Title: Head coach

Personal information
- Born: October 8, 1986 (age 40); Mount Juliet, Tennessee, U.S.
- Listed height: 6 ft 4 in (1.93 m)
- Listed weight: 375 lb (170 kg)

Career information
- High school: Mount Juliet
- College: Bethel (TN)
- NFL draft: 2011: 7th round, 245th overall pick

Career history

Playing
- Buffalo Bills (2011); Tennessee Titans (2012); Omaha Nighthawks (2012); New York Giants (2013)*; Carolina Panthers (2013–2014)*
- * Offseason or practice squad member only

Coaching
- Buffalo (NY) Bishop Timon HS (2014) Offensive & defensive line coach; Mount Juliet (TN) HS (2015) Offensive & defensive line coach; Bethel (TN) (2016–2018) Offensive line coach; Bethel (TN) (2019–2024) Head coach; Stetson (2025–present) Head coach

Head coaching record
- Regular season: 47–34 (.580)
- Postseason: 1–2 (.333)
- Career: 48–36 (.571)
- Stats at Pro Football Reference

Leslie Michael Jasper (born October 8, 1986) is an American college football coach and former player. He is the head football coach for Stetson University. Jasper was selected by the Buffalo Bills of the National Football League (NFL) in the seventh round of the 2011 NFL draft. He played college football at Bethel as a defensive tackle and offensive guard. Jasper, during his college career, was extremely large even by defensive tackle standards, weighing approximately 450 pounds; he reduced his weight to 375 pounds at the behest of Bills coach Chan Gailey. As of the 2025 NFL draft, Jasper remains the most recent NFL draft selection from the National Association of Intercollegiate Athletics (NAIA).

== Professional career ==
Pre-draft measurables
Height	Weight	40-yard dash	10-yard split	20-yard split	20-yard shuttle	Three-cone drill	Vertical jump	Broad jump	Bench press
6 ft 4 1/8 in (1.93 m)	394 lb (179 kg)	5.53 s	1.84 s	3.14 s	5.08 s	8.44 s	28.0 in (0.71 m)	9 ft 0 in (2.74 m)	33 reps
All values from Pro Day

=== Buffalo Bills ===
Jasper was released prior to the start of the 2011 season in final cuts and was placed on the practice squad. The Bills activated Jasper on December 27, 2011, when tight end Mike Caussin was placed on the injured reserve list. He was waived again by the Bills on August 13, 2012.

=== Tennessee Titans ===
Jasper was signed by the Tennessee Titans on August 15, 2012, but was waived shortly thereafter.

=== Omaha Nighthawks ===
The Nighthawks signed Jasper in September 2012, where he played both ways as a starter on the offensive line and as a nose tackle in the goal-line package on 3rd and 1 situations.

=== New York Giants ===
The Giants signed Jasper to a future contract for 2013. On August 25, 2013, he was cut by the Giants.

=== Carolina Panthers ===
The Panthers signed Jasper to their practice squad on September 11, 2013, and then signed him as a free agent on January 14, 2014.

== Coaching career ==
From 2016 to 2018, Jasper was the offensive line coach at his alma mater, Bethel University. On January 24, 2019, he was named Bethel's head football coach.

On December 20, 2024, Jasper was hired as the head coach for the Stetson Hatters.

== Head coaching record ==
Year	Team	Overall	Conference	Standing	Bowl/playoffs	NAIA Coaches'^{#}
Bethel Wildcats (Mid-South Conference) (2019–2024)
2019	Bethel	5–6	2–5	T–6th (Bluegrass)		
2020–21	Bethel	3–4	3–4	T–4th (Bluegrass)		
2021	Bethel	7–4	4–3	T–3rd (Bluegrass)		
2022	Bethel	11–1	8–0	1st	L NAIA First Round	4
2023	Bethel	11–2	5–1	2nd	L NAIA Quarterfinal	7
2024	Bethel	7–3	3–3	T–3rd		
Bethel:		44–20	25–16			
Stetson Hatters (Pioneer Football League) (2025–present)
2025	Stetson	3–9	2–6	9th		
2026	Stetson	1–10	0–7	11th		
Stetson:		4–19	2–13			
Total:		48–39				
National championship Conference title Conference division title or championship game berth
