= Jarod Dodson =

American football coach (born 1975)

Current position
- Title: Associate head coach, offensive Coordinator, & quarterbacks coach
- Team: Stetson
- Conference: PFL

Biographical details
- Born: June 19, 1975 (age 51); Palmdale, California, U.S.
- Education: University of South Dakota (1999, 2000)

Playing career
- 1994–1997: South Dakota
- Position: Defensive back

Coaching career (HC unless noted)
- 1998–1999: South Dakota (GA)
- 2000–2004: Michigan Tech (ST/LB/DB)
- 2005: South Dakota (WR)
- 2006: South Dakota (ST/DB)
- 2007: South Dakota (WR/DB)
- 2008: South Dakota (DC)
- 2009: Buffalo (co-ST/CB)
- 2010–2011: Old Dominion (DB)
- 2012–2014: South Dakota Mines (DC/DB)
- 2015–2017: Alfred State
- 2018: Buffalo (defensive analyst)
- 2019–2024: St. Thomas (MN) (WR)
- 2025–present: Stetson (assoc. HC/OC/QB)

Head coaching record
- Overall: 3–27

Jarod Dodson (born June 19, 1975) is an American college football coach. He is the associate head coach, offensive coordinator, and quarterbacks coach for Stetson University, a position he has held since 2025. He was the head football coach for Alfred State College from 2015 to 2017. He also coached for South Dakota, Michigan Tech, Buffalo, Old Dominion, South Dakota Mines, and St. Thomas (MN). He played college football for South Dakota as a defensive back.

== Head coaching record ==
| Year | Team | Overall | Conference | Standing | Bowl/playoffs |
|---|---|---|---|---|---|
Alfred State Pioneers (NCAA Division III independent) (2015–2016)
| 2015 | Alfred State | 1–9 | | | |
| 2016 | Alfred State | 1–9 | | | |
Alfred State Pioneers (Eastern Collegiate Football Conference) (2017)
| 2017 | Alfred State | 1–9 | 1–6 | T–7th | |
| Alfred State: | | 3–27 | 1–6 | | |
| Total: | | 3–27 | | | |
