= Davidson College Stadium =

New Davidson football stadium in 2024, stadium in North Carolina, college sports

Coordinates: 35.499598°N 80.842848°W

- Interactive map of Davidson College Stadium
- Location: 109 Patterson Court Circle; Davidson, North Carolina 28036
- Owner: Davidson College
- Operator: Davidson College
- Capacity: 5,000

Construction
- Opened: 2024; 2 years ago

Tenants
- Davidson Wildcats (NCAA) teams: Football; Lacrosse; Track and field

Davidson College Stadium is a stadium in Davidson, North Carolina. It is home to the Davidson Wildcats football, lacrosse, and track and field teams.

== Overview ==
Davidson College Stadium opened to the Davidson Wildcats football team on September 7, 2024 with a 49-14 win over Catawba College after Davidson football spent 100 years at Richardson Stadium. The Stadium is also accompanied by the Game Changes Field House, home to locker rooms and the Davidson football offices. The stadium had first been used earlier in the spring of 2024 for Davidson lacrosse.
