= 2025 Elon Phoenix football team =

American college football season

2025 Elon Phoenix football
- Conference: CAA Football
- Record: 6–6 (4–4 CAA)
- Head coach: Tony Trisciani (7th season)
- Offensive coordinator: Doug Martin (1st season)
- Offensive scheme: Air raid
- Defensive coordinator: Casey Vance (1st season)
- Base defense: Multiple 3–3–5
- Home stadium: Rhodes Stadium

2025 Coastal Athletic Association Football Conference standings
	Conf.			Overall
Team	W		L	W		L
No. 11 Rhode Island $^	8	–	0	11	–	3
No. 4т Villanova ^	7	–	1	12	–	3
No. 23 New Hampshire ^	6	–	2	8	–	5
No. 22 Monmouth	6	–	2	9	–	3
William & Mary	6	–	2	7	–	5
Maine	5	–	3	6	–	6
Elon	4	–	4	6	–	6
Stony Brook	4	–	4	6	–	6
Towson	4	–	4	6	–	6
North Carolina A&T	2	–	6	2	–	10
Campbell	2	–	6	2	–	10
Bryant	1	–	7	3	–	9
Albany	1	–	7	2	–	10
Hampton	0	–	8	2	–	10
$ – Conference champion; ^ – FCS playoff participant; Rankings from STATS Poll

The 2025 Elon Phoenix football team represented Elon University as a member of the Coastal Athletic Association Football Conference (CAA) during the 2025 NCAA Division I FCS football season. The Phoenix were led by seventh-year head coach Tony Trisciani and played their home games at Rhodes Stadium in Elon, North Carolina.

== Schedule ==
Date	Time	Opponent	Site	TV	Result	Attendance
August 28	7:30 p.m.	at Duke*	Wallace Wade Stadium; Durham, NC	ACCNX/ESPN+	L 17–45	15,677
September 6	6:00 p.m.	Davidson*	Rhodes Stadium; Elon, NC	FloSports/WMYV	W 55–7	6,015
September 13	2:30 p.m.	at Western Carolina*	E.J. Whitmire Stadium; Cullowhee, NC	ESPN+	W 37–31	10,007
September 20	5:30 p.m.	at East Tennessee State*	William B. Greene Jr. Stadium; Johnson City, TN	ESPN+	L 16–26	8,030
September 27	2:00 p.m.	Hampton	Rhodes Stadium; Elon, NC	FloSports/WMYV	W 41–20	11,158
October 4	4:00 p.m.	at Towson	Johnny Unitas Stadium; Towson, MD	FloSports	W 17–3	6,163
October 11	2:00 p.m.	No. 18 Villanova^{†}	Rhodes Stadium; Elon, NC	FloSports/WMYV	L 21–29	7,126
October 18	3:30 p.m.	at William & Mary	Zable Stadium; Williamsburg, VA	FloSports	L 21–26	4,369
October 25	1:00 p.m.	at Maine	Alfond Stadium; Orono, ME	FloSports	L 14–35	5,243
November 8	2:00 p.m.	No. 14 Rhode Island	Rhodes Stadium; Elon, NC	FloSports/WMYV	L 20–34	4,153
November 15	2:00 p.m.	at Campbell	Barker-Lane Stadium; Buies Creek, NC	FloSports	W 31–24	3,243
November 22	2:00 p.m.	North Carolina A&T	Rhodes Stadium; Elon, NC	FloSports/WMYV	W 55–17	5,077
*Non-conference game; ^{†}Homecoming; Rankings from STATS Poll released prior to the game; All times are in Eastern time

== Game summaries ==
=== at Duke (FBS) ===
Elon Phoenix (0–0) vs Duke Blue Devils (FBS) (0–0) – Game summary

Quarter	1	2	3	4	Total
Phoenix	0	10	0	7	17
Blue Devils (FBS)	3	7	14	21	45

at Wallace Wade Stadium • Durham, North Carolina

- Date: August 28
- Game time: 7:30 p.m.
- Game weather:
- Game attendance: 15,677
- Referee:
- TV announcers (ACCNX/ESPN+): Matt Schick (play-by-play), Forrest Conoly (analyst), and Michella Chester (sideline)

Game information

First quarter

- DUKE – Todd Pelino 41-yard field goal, 1:31. Blue Devils 3–0. Drive: 13 plays, 72 yards, 4:32.

Second quarter

- ELON – Luke Barnes 35-yard field goal, 9:50. Tied 3–3. Drive: 13 plays, 58 yards, 6:41.
- DUKE – Jaquez Moore 32-yard run (Todd Pelino kick), 8:01. Blue Devils 10–3. Drive: 4 plays, 75 yards, 1:49.
- ELON – Landen Clark 2-yard run (Luke Barnes kick), 3:43. Tied 10–10. Drive: 9 plays, 75 yards, 4:18.

Third quarter

- DUKE – Sahmir Hagans 15-yard pass from Darian Mensah (Todd Pelino kick), 10:59. Blue Devils 17–10. Drive: 8 plays, 83 yards, 3:57.
- DUKE – Andrel Anthony 27-yard pass from Darian Mensah (Todd Pelino kick), 5:46. Blue Devils 24–10. Drive: 8 plays, 88 yards, 3:36.

Fourth quarter

- ELON – Landyn Backey 3-yard run (Luke Barnes kick), 14:12. Blue Devils 24–17. Drive: 12 plays, 75 yards, 6:34.
- DUKE – Sahmir Hagans 6-yard pass from Darian Mensah (Todd Pelino kick), 11:28. Blue Devils 31–17. Drive: 5 plays, 80 yards, 2:39.
- DUKE – Que'Sean Brown 78-yard punt return (Todd Pelino kick), 9:18. Blue Devils 38–17.
- DUKE – Peyton Jones 5-yard run (Todd Pelino kick), 1:55. Blue Devils 45–17. Drive: 7 plays, 47 yards, 5:00.

Statistics	ELON	DUKE
First downs	14	23
Plays–yards	62–275	59–548
Rushes–yards	44–163	25–159
Passing yards	112	389
Passing: comp–att–int	11–18–0	27–34–0
Turnovers	0	1
Time of possession	32:53	27:07

Team	Category	Player	Statistics
Elon	Passing	Landen Clark	10/16, 101 yards
Elon	Rushing	Landen Clark	18 carries, 61 yards, 1 TD
Elon	Receiving	Dylan Magazu	3 receptions, 61 yards
Duke	Passing	Darian Mensah	27/34, 389 yards, 3 TD
Duke	Rushing	Anderson Castle	3 carries, 69 yards
Duke	Receiving	Cooper Barkate	5 receptions, 117 yards

=== Davidson ===
Davidson Wildcats (0-1) vs. Elon Phoenix (0-1) – Game summary

Quarter	1	2	3	4	Total
Wildcats	0	0	7	0	7
Phoenix	10	31	7	7	55

at Rhodes Stadium • Elon, NC

- Date: September 6
- Game time: 6:00 PM EDT
- Game attendance: 6,015
- TV announcers (FloFootball): Taylor Durham (play-by-play) and Dr. Khirey Walker (analyst)

Game information

First Quarter

- ELON – Landen Clark 1-yard run (Luke Barnes kick), 11:41. Phoenix 7–0. Drive: 8 plays, 56 yards, 3:19.
- ELON − Luke Barnes 27-yard field goal, 7:43. Phoenix 10–0. Drive: 8 plays, 40 yards, 2:24.

Second Quarter

- ELON − Landyn Backey 22-yard pass from Landen Clark (Luke Barnes kick), 11:54. Phoenix 17−0. Drive: 4 plays, 46 yards, 1:27.
- ELON − Landyn Backey 44-yard pass from Landen Clark (Luke Barnes kick), 8:04. Phoenix 24−0. Drive: 5 plays, 55 yards, 2:12.
- ELON − Luke Barnes 38-yard field goal, 2:46. Phoenix 27–0. Drive: 10 plays, 58 yards, 4:09.
- ELON – TJ Thomas Jr. 15-yard run (Luke Barnes kick), 1:06. Phoenix 34–0. Drive: 4 plays, 43 yards, 0:37.
- ELON − Isaiah Fuhrmann 20-yard pass from Landen Clark (Luke Barnes kick), 0:44. Phoenix 41−0. Drive: 1 play, 20 yards, 0:07.

Third Quarter

- DAV − Ivan Hoyt 25-yard pass from Coulter Cleland (Christos Tzoumakas kick), 11:49. Phoenix 41−7. Drive: 9 plays, 62 yards, 3:05.
- ELON – Jimmyll Williams 4-yard run (Luke Barnes kick), 5:16. Phoenix 48–7. Drive: 6 plays, 47 yards, 2:10.

Fourth Quarter

- ELON – Dan Frederick 1-yard run (Luke Barnes kick), 13:29. Phoenix 55–7. Drive: 6 plays, 41 yards, 3:51.

Statistics	DAV	ELON
First downs	10	30
Total yards	158	547
Rushing yards	65	289
Passing yards	93	258
Passing: Comp–Att–Int	12–30–0	16–29–0
Time of possession	23:45	36:15

Team	Category	Player	Statistics
Davidson	Passing	Coulter Cleland	10/25, 81 yards, 1 TD
Davidson	Rushing	Mason Sheron	6 carries, 31 yards
Davidson	Receiving	Brody Reina	6 receptions, 43 yards
Elon	Passing	Landen Clark	15/24, 247 yards, 3 TDs
Elon	Rushing	Jimmyll Williams	9 carries, 79 yards, 1 TD
Elon	Receiving	Landyn Backey	5 receptions, 118 yards, 2 TDs

=== at Western Carolina ===
Elon Phoenix (1-1) vs. Western Carolina Catamounts (0-2) – Game summary

Quarter	1	2	3	4	Total
Phoenix	14	9	6	8	37
Catamounts	7	7	14	3	31

at E.J. Whitmire Stadium • Cullowhee, NC

- Date: September 13
- Game time: 2:30 p.m. EDT
- Game weather: Sunny • Temperature: 77 °F (25 °C) • Wind: NW at 4 miles per hour (6.4 km/h)
- Game attendance: 10,007
- Referee: Jake Grombach
- TV announcers (ESPN+): Pete Yanity (play-by-play) and John Brannon III (analyst)

Game information

First quarter

- ELON – Zimere Winston 78-yard pass from Landen Clark (Luke Barnes kick), 14:07. Phoenix 7–0. Drive: 3 plays, 81 yards, 0:50.
- WCU – James Tyre 4-yard pass from Bennett Judy (Marcus Trout kick), 10:48. Tied 7–7. Drive: 10 plays, 78 yards, 3:19.
- ELON – Landyn Backey 35-yard pass from Landen Clark (Luke Barnes kick), 0:06. Phoenix 14–7. Drive: 3 plays, 88 yards, 1:21.

Second quarter

- ELON – Landen Clark 10-yard run (Pass failed), 9:13. Phoenix 20–7. Drive: 12 plays, 88 yards, 5:30.
- WCU – Dominic Dutton 7-yard pass from Isaac Lee (Marcus Trout kick), 3:06. Phoenix 20–14. Drive: 14 plays, 75 yards, 6:07.
- ELON – Luke Barnes 48-yard field goal, 0:00. Phoenix 23–14. Drive: 6 plays, 49 yards, 0:41.

Third quarter

- WCU – Dominic Dutton 97-yard kick return (Marcus Trout kick), 14:48. Phoenix 23–21. Drive: 0 plays, 0 yards, 0:00.
- WCU – James Tyre 62-yard fumble recovery (Christian Lowery kick), 11:07. Catamounts 28–23. Drive: 3 plays, 80 yards, 0:46.
- ELON – Luke Barnes 38-yard field goal, 8:22. Catamounts 28–26. Drive: 6 plays, 26 yards, 2:34.
- ELON – Luke Barnes 42-yard field goal, 1:34. Phoenix 29–28. Drive: 11 plays, 46 yards, 4:58.

Fourth quarter

- WCU – Marcus Trout 28-yard field goal, 13:05. Catamounts 31–29. Drive: 12 plays, 65 yards, 3:29.
- ELON – Landen Clark 10-yard run (Landen Clark pass), 4:53. Phoenix 37–31. Drive: 10 plays, 79 yards, 3:59.

Statistics	ELON	WCU
First downs	24	25
Total yards	456	425
Rushing yards	151	179
Passing yards	305	246
Passing: Comp–Att–Int	11–29–2	36–55–2
Time of possession	30:23	29:27

Team	Category	Player	Statistics
Elon	Passing	Landen Clark	11/28, 305 yards, 2 TD, 2 INT
Elon	Rushing	Landen Clark	25 carries, 72 yards
Elon	Receiving	Isaiah Fuhrmann	5 receptions, 105 yards
Western Carolina	Passing	Isaac Lee	19/31, 132 yards, TD, 2 INT
Western Carolina	Rushing	Patrick Boyd Jr.	10 carries, 58 yards
Western Carolina	Receiving	James Tyre	9 receptions, 122 yards, TD

=== at East Tennessee State ===
Elon Phoenix (2-1) vs. East Tennessee State Buccaneers (1-2) – Game summary

Quarter	1	2	3	4	Total
Phoenix	3	7	0	6	16
Buccaneers	3	14	3	6	26

at William B. Greene Jr. Stadium • Johnson City, TN

- Date: September 20
- Game time: 5:30 p.m. EDT
- Game weather: Cloudy • Temperature: 80 °F (27 °C) • Wind: NW at 8 miles per hour (13 km/h)
- Game attendance: 8,030
- Referee: Michael Farmer
- TV announcers (ESPN+): Keith Brake (play-by-play), Mark Hutsell (analyst) and Kennedy Story (sideline)

Game information

First Quarter

- (10:15) ELON – Luke Barnes 42-yard field goal (Drive: 4 plays, 4 yards, 1:33; Elon 3–0)
- (0:15) ETSU – Ewan Johnson 35-yard field goal (Drive: 4 plays, 5 yards, 1:22; Tied 3–3)

Second Quarter

- (10:11) ETSU – Cade McNamara 9-yard run, Ewan Johnson kick (Drive: 9 plays, 77 yards, 2:50; East Tennessee State 10–3)
- (0:46) ELON – Dylan Magazu 8-yard pass from Landen Clark, Luke Barnes kick (Drive: 10 plays, 82 yards, 2:39; Tied 10–10)
- (0:08) ETSU – Jason Albritton 1-yard run, Ewan Johnson kick (Drive: 5 plays, 65 yards, 0:38; East Tennessee State 17–10)

Third Quarter

- (10:07) ETSU – Ewan Johnson 49-yard field goal (Drive: 5 plays, 15 yards, 2:41; East Tennessee State 20–10)

Fourth Quarter

- (7:37) ETSU – Khalil Eichelberger 5-yard run (Drive: 12 plays, 87 yards, 5:34; East Tennessee State 26–10)
- (6:06) ELON – Isaiah Fuhrmann 11-yard pass from Landen Clark (Drive: 3 plays, 70 yards, 1:22; East Tennessee State 26–16)

Statistics	ELON	ETSU
First downs	15	24
Total yards	293	406
Rushing yards	70	138
Passing yards	223	268
Passing: Comp–Att–Int	15–29–1	30–45–1
Time of possession	25:26	34:34

Team	Category	Player	Statistics
Elon	Passing	Landen Clark	15/29, 223 yards, 2 TD, INT
Elon	Rushing	Landen Clark	14 carries, 47 yards
Elon	Receiving	Landyn Backey	4 receptions, 91 yards
East Tennessee State	Passing	Cade McNamara	30/45, 268 yards, INT
East Tennessee State	Rushing	Jason Albritton	11 carries, 56 yards, TD
East Tennessee State	Receiving	Ephraim Floyd	12 receptions, 145 yards

=== Hampton ===
Hampton Pirates (1-3) vs. Elon Phoenix (2-2) – Game summary

Quarter	1	2	3	4	Total
Pirates	6	0	14	0	20
Phoenix	7	10	7	17	41

at Rhodes Stadium • Elon, NC

- Date: September 27
- Game time: 2:00 PM EDT
- TV announcers (FloSports): Taylor Durham (play-by-play), Dr. Khirey Walker (analyst) and Hannah Bradey (sideline)

Statistics	HAMP	ELON
First downs		
Total yards		
Rushing yards		
Passing yards		
Passing: Comp–Att–Int		
Time of possession		

Team	Category	Player	Statistics
Hampton	Passing		
Hampton	Rushing		
Hampton	Receiving		
Elon	Passing		
Elon	Rushing		
Elon	Receiving		

=== at Towson ===
Elon Phoenix (3-2) vs. Towson Tigers (3-2) – Game summary

Quarter	1	2	3	4	Total
Phoenix	3	7	0	7	17
Tigers	0	0	0	3	3

at Johnny Unitas Stadium • Towson, MD

- Date: October 4
- Game time: 4:00 PM EDT

Statistics	ELON	TOW
First downs		
Total yards		
Rushing yards		
Passing yards		
Passing: Comp–Att–Int		
Time of possession		

Team	Category	Player	Statistics
Elon	Passing		
Elon	Rushing		
Elon	Receiving		
Towson	Passing		
Towson	Rushing		
Towson	Receiving		

=== No. 18 Villanova ===
No. 18 Villanova Wildcats (3–2) at Elon Phoenix (4–2) – Game summary

Quarter	1	2	3	4	Total
No. 18 Wildcats	0	3	14	12	29
Phoenix	7	7	0	7	21

at Rhodes Stadium • Elon, NC

- Date: October 11
- Game time: 2:00 PM EDT
- Game weather: Sunny
- Game attendance: 7,126
- Referee: Bill McKeever
- TV: FloSports

Game information

First quarter

- ELON – TJ Thomas Jr. 8-yard run (Luke Barnes kick), 12:51. Phoenix 7–0. Drive: 4 plays, 74 yards, 2:03.

Second quarter

- VILL – Jack Barnum 38-yard field goal, 12:05. Phoenix 7–3. Drive: 16 plays, 55 yards, 7:42.
- ELON – Landen Clark 4-yard run (Luke Barnes kick), 5:22. Phoenix 14–3. Drive: 13 plays, 75 yards, 6:43.

Third quarter

- VILL – Luke Colella 20-yard pass from Pat McQuaide (Jack Barnum kick), 5:08. Phoenix 14–10. Drive: 11 plays, 55 yards, 6:23.
- VILL – Luke Colella 42-yard pass from Pat McQuaide (Jack Barnum kick), 1:44. Wildcats 17–14. Drive: 4 plays, 50 yards, 1:18.

Fourth quarter

- VILL – Jack Barnum 26-yard field goal, 9:44. Wildcats 20–14. Drive: 10 plays, 71 yards, 4:59.
- ELON – TJ Thomas Jr. 2-yard run (Luke Barnes kick), 5:25. Phoenix 21–20. Drive: 9 plays, 80 yards, 4:14.
- VILL – Ja'briel Mace 97-yard kickoff return (pass failed), 5:10. Wildcats 26–21.
- VILL – Jack Barnum 32-yard field goal, 1:03. Wildcats 29–21. Drive: 8 plays, 59 yards, 2:42.

Statistics	VILL	ELON
First downs	20	18
Plays–yards	70–392	55–344
Rushes–yards	39–137	33–124
Passing yards	255	220
Passing: Comp–Att–Int	23–31–0	14–22–1
Turnovers	0	1
Time of possession	35:21	24:39

Team	Category	Player	Statistics
Villanova	Passing	Pat McQuaide	23/31, 255 yards, 2 TD
Villanova	Rushing	Isaiah Ragland	19 carries, 68 yards
Villanova	Receiving	Luke Colella	10 receptions, 125 yards, 2 TD
Elon	Passing	Landen Clark	14/21, 220 yards, INT
Elon	Rushing	TJ Thomas Jr.	11 carries, 49 yards, 2 TD
Elon	Receiving	Isaiah Fuhrmann	2 receptions, 65 yards

=== at William & Mary ===
Elon Phoenix (4-3) vs. William & Mary Tribe (3-3) – Game summary

Quarter	1	2	3	4	Total
Phoenix	7	7	0	7	21
Tribe	0	10	16	0	26

at Zable Stadium • Williamsburg, VA

- Date: October 18
- Game time: 3:30 PM EDT

Statistics	ELON	W&M
First downs		
Total yards		
Rushing yards		
Passing yards		
Passing: Comp–Att–Int		
Time of possession		

Team	Category	Player	Statistics
Elon	Passing		
Elon	Rushing		
Elon	Receiving		
William & Mary	Passing		
William & Mary	Rushing		
William & Mary	Receiving		

=== at Maine ===
Elon Phoenix (4-4) vs. Maine Black Bears (3-4) – Game summary

Quarter	1	2	3	4	Total
Phoenix	-	-	-	-	0
Black Bears	-	-	-	-	0

at Alfond Sports Stadium • Orono, ME

- Date: October 25
- Game time: 1:00 PM EDT

Statistics	ELON	ME
First downs		
Total yards		
Rushing yards		
Passing yards		
Passing: Comp–Att–Int		
Time of possession		

Team	Category	Player	Statistics
Elon	Passing		
Elon	Rushing		
Elon	Receiving		
Maine	Passing		
Maine	Rushing		
Maine	Receiving		

=== No. 14 Rhode Island ===
No. 14 Rhode Island Rams (7–2) at Elon Phoenix (4–5) – Game summary

Quarter	1	2	3	4	Total
No. 14 Rams	7	17	3	7	34
Phoenix	3	7	7	3	20

at Rhodes Stadium • Elon, NC

- Date: November 8
- Game time: 2:00 PM EST
- Game weather: Sunny
- Game attendance: 4,153
- Referee: Justin Ackley
- TV announcers (FloSports/WMYV): Taylor Durham (play-by-play), Dr. Khirey Walker (analyst) and Hannah Bradley (sideline)

Game information

First quarter

- ELON – Luke Barnes 50-yard field goal, 11:30. Phoenix 3–0. Drive: 9 plays, 53 yards, 3:25.
- URI – Devin Farrell 10-yard run (Garth White kick), 3:49. Rams 7–3. Drive: 15 plays, 96 yards, 7:41.

Second quarter

- URI – Garth White 52-yard field goal, 11:06. Rams 10–3. Drive: 10 plays, 46 yards, 4:23.
- URI – Greg Gaines III 19-yard pass from Devin Farrell (Garth White kick), 7:23. Rams 17–3. Drive: 5 plays, 70 yards, 1:42.
- URI – Aboraa Kwarteng 70-yard pass from Devin Farrell (Garth White kick), 4:57. Rams 24–3. Drive: 1 play, 70 yards, 0:12.
- ELON – Isaiah Fuhrmann 9-yard pass from Landen Clark (Luke Barnes kick), 0:02. Rams 24–10. Drive: 8 plays, 35 yards, 1:32.

Third quarter

- URI – Garth White 43-yard field goal, 10:35. Rams 27–10. Drive: 9 plays, 49 yards, 4:25.
- ELON – Darren James-Hamilton 70-yard punt return (Luke Barnes kick), 5:08. Rams 27–17.

Fourth quarter

- URI – Alex McClelland 6-yard run (Garth White kick), 14:54. Rams 34–17. Drive: 10 plays, 65 yards, 5:14.
- ELON – Luke Barnes 41-yard field goal, 3:15. Rams 34–20. Drive: 5 plays, 55 yards, 1:26.

Statistics	URI	ELON
First downs	24	11
Plays–yards	71–442	54–225
Rushes–yards	41–133	22–30
Passing yards	309	195
Passing: Comp–Att–Int	24–30–0	18–32–0
Turnovers	0	0
Time of possession	37:17	22:43

Team	Category	Player	Statistics
Rhode Island	Passing	Devin Farrell	24/30, 309 yards, 2 TD
Rhode Island	Rushing	Antwain Littleton Jr.	20 carries, 101 yards
Rhode Island	Receiving	Aboraa Kwarteng	4 receptions, 124 yards, TD
Elon	Passing	Landen Clark	12/18, 104 yards, TD
Elon	Rushing	Jimmyll Williams	8 carries, 38 yards
Elon	Receiving	Isaiah Fuhrmann	4 receptions, 79 yards, TD

=== at Campbell ===
Elon Phoenix (0-0) vs. Campbell Fighting Camels (0-0) – Game summary

Quarter	1	2	3	4	Total
Phoenix	-	-	-	-	0
Fighting Camels	-	-	-	-	0

at Barker–Lane Stadium • Buies Creek, NC

- Date: November 15
- Game time: 2:00 PM EST

Statistics	ELON	CAM
First downs		
Total yards		
Rushing yards		
Passing yards		
Passing: Comp–Att–Int		
Time of possession		

Team	Category	Player	Statistics
Elon	Passing		
Elon	Rushing		
Elon	Receiving		
Campbell	Passing		
Campbell	Rushing		
Campbell	Receiving		

=== North Carolina A&T ===
North Carolina A&T Aggies (0-0) vs. Elon Phoenix (0-0) – Game summary

Quarter	1	2	3	4	Total
Aggies	-	-	-	-	0
Phoenix	-	-	-	-	0

at Rhodes Stadium • Elon, NC

- Date: November 22
- Game time: 2:00 PM EST

Statistics	NCAT	ELON
First downs		
Total yards		
Rushing yards		
Passing yards		
Passing: Comp–Att–Int		
Time of possession		

Team	Category	Player	Statistics
North Carolina A&T	Passing		
North Carolina A&T	Rushing		
North Carolina A&T	Receiving		
Elon	Passing		
Elon	Rushing		
Elon	Receiving		
