= 2025 Davidson Wildcats football team =

American college football season

2025 Davidson Wildcats football
- Conference: Pioneer Football League
- Record: 2–10 (1–7 PFL)
- Head coach: Saj Thakkar (1st season)
- Offensive coordinator: Keegan Kennedy (1st season)
- Defensive coordinator: Miles Ahles (1st season)
- Home stadium: Davidson College Stadium

2025 Pioneer Football League standings
	Conf.			Overall
Team	W		L	W		L
Drake $^	7	–	1	8	–	4
Presbyterian	6	–	2	10	–	2
San Diego	6	–	2	8	–	4
St. Thomas (MN)	5	–	3	7	–	5
Dayton	5	–	3	7	–	4
Morehead State	4	–	4	6	–	6
Butler	4	–	4	6	–	6
Marist	3	–	5	5	–	7
Stetson	2	–	6	3	–	9
Davidson	1	–	7	2	–	10
Valparaiso	1	–	7	2	–	10
$ – Conference champion; ^ – FCS playoff participant; Rankings from STATS Poll

The 2025 Davidson Wildcats football team represented Davidson College as a member of the Pioneer Football League (PFL) during the 2025 NCAA Division I FCS football season. The Wildcats were led by first-year head coach Saj Thakkar and played their home games at Davidson College Stadium located in Davidson, North Carolina.

== Schedule ==
Date	Time	Opponent	Site	TV	Result	Attendance
August 30	1:00 pm	Georgetown*	Davidson College Stadium; Davidson, NC	ESPN+	L 14–51	3,291
September 6	6:00 pm	at Elon*	Rhodes Stadium; Elon, NC	FloFootball	L 7–55	6,015
September 13	1:00 pm	at No. 15 Tennessee Tech*	Tucker Stadium; Cookeville, TN	ESPN+	L 14–72	7,278
September 20	7:00 pm	Greensboro*	Davidson College Stadium; Davidson, NC	ESPN+	W 48–0	3,079
October 4	1:00 pm	at Stetson	Spec Martin Stadium; DeLand, FL	ESPN+	L 32–35	1,250
October 11	1:00 pm	St. Thomas	Davidson College Stadium; Davidson, NC	ESPN+	L 13–57	
October 18	1:00 pm	at Drake	Drake Stadium; Des Moines, IA	ESPN+	L 0−45	2,721
October 25	12:00 pm	San Diego	Davidson College Stadium; Davidson, NC	ESPN+	L 28–40	2,146
November 1	1:00 pm	at Morehead State	Phil Simms Stadium; Morehead, KY	ESPN+	L 24–28	3,907
November 8	5:00 pm	No. 25 Presbyterian	Davidson College Stadium; Davidson, NC	ESPN+	W 14–13	2,373
November 15	12:00 pm	at Marist	Leonidoff Field; Poughkeepsie, NY	ESPN+	L 10–37	1,148
November 22	1:00 pm	Dayton	Davidson College Stadium; Davidson, NC	ESPN+	L 14–42	2,202
*Non-conference game; Rankings from STATS Poll released prior to the game; All times are in Eastern time

== Game summaries ==
=== Georgetown ===
Georgetown Hoyas (0-0) vs. Davidson Wildcats (0-0) – Game summary

Quarter	1	2	3	4	Total
Hoyas	20	18	7	6	51
Wildcats	7	7	0	0	14

at Davidson College Stadium • Davidson, NC

- Date: August 30
- Game time: 1:00 PM EDT
- Game weather: Sunny • Temperature: 79 °F (26 °C) • Wind: NE at 4 miles per hour (6.4 km/h)
- Game attendance: 3,291
- Referee: Charles Olson
- TV announcers (ESPN+): Paul Roper (play-by-play) and Mike Fresina (analyst)

Game information

First quarter

- GTWN – Savion Hart 69-yard run (Thomas Anderson kick), 14:20. Hoyas 7–0. Drive: 2 plays, 78 yards, 0:33.
- GTWN – Savion Hart 27-yard run (Thomas Anderson kick), 3:30. Hoyas 14–0. Drive: 8 plays, 65 yards, 3:43.
- DAV – Brody Reina 55-yard pass from Coulter Cleland (Christos Tzoumakas kick), 1:11. Hoyas 14–7. Drive: 5 plays, 65 yards, 2:19.
- GTWN – Savion Hart 73-yard pass from Dez Thomas II (Thomas Anderson kick failed), 0:24. Hoyas 20–7. Drive: 2 plays, 75 yards, 0:47.

Second quarter

- GTWN – Jimmy Kibble 41-yard pass from Danny Lauter (Thomas Anderson kick), 11:45. Hoyas 27–7. Drive: 6 plays, 84 yards, 2:20.
- GTWN – Bryce Cox 3-yard run (Dez Thomas II–Isaiah Grimes pass), 3:52. Hoyas 35–7. Drive: 13 plays, 76 yards, 5:35.
- GTWN – Thomas Anderson 41-yard field goal, 1:14. Hoyas 38–7. Drive: 4 plays, 2 yards, 2:23.
- DAV – Coulter Cleland 12-yard run (Christos Tzoumakas kick), 0:14. Hoyas 38–14. Drive: 9 plays, 75 yards, 1:00.

Third quarter

- GTWN – Nicholas Dunneman 7-yard pass from Danny Lauter (Thomas Anderson kick), 8:36. Hoyas 45–14. Drive: 8 plays, 58 yards, 3:03.

Fourth quarter

- GTWN – Jayden Sumpter 4-yard run (Thomas Anderson kick failed), 14:56. Hoyas 51–14. Drive: 10 plays, 75 yards, 4:31.

Statistics	GTWN	DAV
First downs	23	18
Total yards	543	329
Rushing yards	282	139
Passing yards	261	190
Passing: Comp–Att–Int	17–23–0	19–31–1
Time of possession	30:40	29:20

Team	Category	Player	Statistics
Georgetown	Passing	Danny Lauter	11/16, 135 yards, 2 TD
Georgetown	Rushing	Savion Hart	8 carries, 123 yards, 2 TD
Georgetown	Receiving	Savion Hart	2 receptions, 78 yards, TD
Davidson	Passing	Coulter Cleland	12/17, 128 yards, TD, INT
Davidson	Rushing	Coulter Cleland	8 carries, 57 yards, TD
Davidson	Receiving	Brody Reina	1 reception, 55 yards, TD

=== at Elon ===
Davidson Wildcats (0-1) vs. Elon Phoenix (0-1) – Game summary

Quarter	1	2	3	4	Total
Wildcats	0	0	7	0	7
Phoenix	10	31	7	7	55

at Rhodes Stadium • Elon, NC

- Date: September 6
- Game time: 6:00 PM EDT
- TV announcers (FloFootball): Taylor Durham (play-by-play) and Dr. Khirey Walker (analyst)

Game information

First Quarter

- ELON – Landen Clark 1-yard run (Luke Barnes kick), 11:41. Phoenix 7–0. Drive: 8 plays, 56 yards, 3:19.
- ELON − Luke Barnes 27-yard field goal, 7:43. Phoenix 10–0. Drive: 8 plays, 40 yards, 2:24.

Second Quarter

- ELON − Landyn Backey 22-yard pass from Landen Clark (Luke Barnes kick), 11:54. Phoenix 17−0. Drive: 4 plays, 46 yards, 1:27.
- ELON − Landyn Backey 44-yard pass from Landen Clark (Luke Barnes kick), 8:04. Phoenix 24−0. Drive: 5 plays, 55 yards, 2:12.
- ELON − Luke Barnes 38-yard field goal, 2:46. Phoenix 27–0. Drive: 10 plays, 58 yards, 4:09.
- ELON – TJ Thomas Jr. 15-yard run (Luke Barnes kick), 1:06. Phoenix 34–0. Drive: 4 plays, 43 yards, 0:37.
- ELON − Isaiah Fuhrmann 20-yard pass from Landen Clark (Luke Barnes kick), 0:44. Phoenix 41−0. Drive: 1 play, 20 yards, 0:07.

Third Quarter

- DAV − Ivan Hoyt 25-yard pass from Coulter Cleland (Christos Tzoumakas kick), 11:49. Phoenix 41−7. Drive: 9 plays, 62 yards, 3:05.
- ELON – Jimmyll Williams 4-yard run (Luke Barnes kick), 5:16. Phoenix 48–7. Drive: 6 plays, 47 yards, 2:10.

Fourth Quarter

- ELON – Dan Frederick 1-yard run (Luke Barnes kick), 13:29. Phoenix 55–7. Drive: 6 plays, 41 yards, 3:51.

Statistics	DAV	ELON
First downs	10	30
Total yards	158	547
Rushing yards	65	289
Passing yards	93	258
Passing: Comp–Att–Int	12/30/0	16/29/0
Time of possession	23:45	36:15

Team	Category	Player	Statistics
Davidson	Passing	Coulter Cleland	10/25, 81 yards, 1 TD
Davidson	Rushing	Mason Sheron	6 carries, 31 yards
Davidson	Receiving	Brody Reina	6 receptions, 43 yards
Elon	Passing	Landen Clark	15/24, 247 yards, 3 TDs
Elon	Rushing	Jimmyll Williams	9 carries, 79 yards, 1 TD
Elon	Receiving	Landyn Backey	5 receptions, 118 yards, 2 TDs

=== at No. 15 Tennessee Tech ===
Davidson Wildcats (0-2) vs. No. 15 Tennessee Tech Golden Eagles (2-0) – Game summary

Quarter	1	2	3	4	Total
Wildcats	0	14	0	0	14
No. 15 Golden Eagles	28	17	21	6	72

at Tucker Stadium • Cookeville, TN

- Date: September 13
- Game time: 1:00 PM EDT
- TV announcers (ESPN+): Dylan Vazzano (play-by-play) and Sam Brooks (analyst)

Statistics	DAV	TNTC
First downs	12	33
Total yards	206	576
Rushing yards	74	308
Passing yards	132	268
Passing: Comp–Att–Int	16–27–1	25–37–0
Time of possession	28:22	31:38

Team	Category	Player	Statistics
Davidson	Passing	Coulter Clealand	16/26, 132 yards, 2 TD, INT
Davidson	Rushing	Mari Adams	11 carries, 58 yards
Davidson	Receiving	Ivan Hoyt	4 receptions, 53 yards, TD
Tennessee Tech	Passing	Kekoa Visperas	23/32, 246 yards, 3 TD
Tennessee Tech	Rushing	Quintell Quinn	9 carries, 122 yards, 2 TD
Tennessee Tech	Receiving	Maury Sullivan	7 receptions, 78 yards

=== Greensboro (DIII) ===
Greensboro Pride (DIII) (1-1) vs. Davidson Wildcats (0-3) – Game summary

Quarter	1	2	3	4	Total
Pride (DIII)	0	0	0	0	0
Wildcats	14	28	6	0	48

at Davidson College Stadium • Davidson, NC

- Date: September 20
- Game time: 7:00 PM EDT
- Game weather: Sunny • Temperature: 85 °F (29 °C) • Wind: SW at 5 miles per hour (8.0 km/h)
- Game attendance: 3,079
- Referee: Jeff Page
- TV announcers (ESPN+): Paul Roper (play-by-play) and Mike Fresina (analyst)

Game information

First Quarter

- (14:19) DAV – Alani Ajigbotosho 53-yard pass from Coulter Cleland, Christos Tzoumakas kick (Drive: 2 plays, 56 yards, 0:36; Davidson 7–0)
- (0:00) DAV – Mason Sheron 5-yard run, Christos Tzoumakas kick (Drive: 16 plays, 80 yards, 5:41; Davidson 14–0)

Second Quarter

- (10:38) DAV – Mari Adams 11-yard run, Christos Tzoumakas kick (Drive: 5 plays, 44 yards, 1:57; Davidson 21–0)
- (7:53) DAV – Ivan Hoyt 34-yard pass from Coulter Cleland, Christos Tzoumakas kick (Drive: 3 plays, 44 yards, 1:17; Davidson 28–0)
- (7:00) DAV – Ivan Hoyt 7-yard pass from Coulter Cleland, Christos Tzoumakas kick (Drive: 2 plays, 24 yards, 0:45; Davidson 35–0)
- (5:31) DAV – Mari Adams 1-yard run, Christos Tzoumakas kick (Drive: 3 plays, 4 yards, 0:40; Davidson 42–0)

Third Quarter

- (11:04) DAV – Casey Bullock 3-yard run (Drive: 5 plays, 45 yards, 2:01; Davidson 48–0)

Fourth Quarter

No scoring plays

Statistics	GRE	DAV
First downs	17	21
Total yards	293	502
Rushing yards	23	256
Passing yards	270	246
Passing: Comp–Att–Int	26–46–3	18–28–1
Time of possession	31:27	28:33

Team	Category	Player	Statistics
Greensboro	Passing	Chase Altis	21/36, 208 yards, 2 INT
Greensboro	Rushing	Orane Forbes	2 carries, 6 yards
Greensboro	Receiving	KJ Brown	6 receptions, 103 yards
Davidson	Passing	Casey Bullock	12/16, 124 yards, INT
Davidson	Rushing	Mari Adams	10 carries, 56 yards, 2 TD
Davidson	Receiving	Alani Ajigbotosho	3 receptions, 70 yards, TD

=== at Stetson ===
Davidson Wildcats (1-3) vs. Stetson Hatters (1-4) – Game summary

Quarter	1	2	3	4	Total
Wildcats	3	14	0	15	32
Hatters	7	14	0	14	35

at Spec Martin Stadium • DeLand, FL

- Date: October 4
- Game time: 1:00 PM EDT
- TV announcers (ESPN+): Whit Watson (play-by-play)

Statistics	DAV	STET
First downs		
Total yards		
Rushing yards		
Passing yards		
Passing: Comp–Att–Int		
Time of possession		

Team	Category	Player	Statistics
Davidson	Passing		
Davidson	Rushing		
Davidson	Receiving		
Stetson	Passing		
Stetson	Rushing		
Stetson	Receiving		

=== St. Thomas (MN) ===
St. Thomas Tommies (2-3) vs. Davidson Wildcats (1-4) – Game summary

Quarter	1	2	3	4	Total
Tommies	7	22	21	7	57
Wildcats	0	0	7	6	13

at Davidson College Stadium • Davidson, NC

- Date: October 11
- Game time: 1:00 PM EDT
- TV announcers (ESPN+): Paul Roper (play-by-play) and Mike Fresina (analyst)

Statistics	STMN	DAV
First downs		
Total yards		
Rushing yards		
Passing yards		
Passing: Comp–Att–Int		
Time of possession		

Team	Category	Player	Statistics
St. Thomas (MN)	Passing		
St. Thomas (MN)	Rushing		
St. Thomas (MN)	Receiving		
Davidson	Passing		
Davidson	Rushing		
Davidson	Receiving		

=== at Drake ===
Davidson Wildcats (1-5) vs. Drake Bulldogs (3-2) – Game summary

Quarter	1	2	3	4	Total
Wildcats	0	0	0	0	0
Bulldogs	21	10	7	7	45

at Drake Stadium • Des Moines, IA

- Date: October 18
- Game time: 12:00 PM CDT
- Game attendance: 2,721
- Box Score

Statistics	DAV	DRKE
First downs	20	31
Total yards	283	570
Rushing yards	31	377
Passing yards	252	193
Passing: Comp–Att–Int	22–41–0	17–23–0
Time of possession	28:11	31:49

Team	Category	Player	Statistics
Davidson	Passing		
Davidson	Rushing		
Davidson	Receiving		
Drake	Passing		
Drake	Rushing		
Drake	Receiving		

=== San Diego ===
San Diego Toreros (3-4) vs. Davidson Wildcats (1-6) – Game summary

Quarter	1	2	3	4	Total
Toreros	-	-	-	-	0
Wildcats	-	-	-	-	0

at Davidson College Stadium • Davidson, NC

- Date: October 25
- Game time: 1:00 PM EDT

Statistics	USD	DAV
First downs		
Total yards		
Rushing yards		
Passing yards		
Passing: Comp–Att–Int		
Time of possession		

Team	Category	Player	Statistics
San Diego	Passing		
San Diego	Rushing		
San Diego	Receiving		
Davidson	Passing		
Davidson	Rushing		
Davidson	Receiving		

=== at Morehead State ===
Davidson Wildcats (1-7) vs. Morehead State Eagles (4-5) – Game summary

Quarter	1	2	3	4	Total
Wildcats	-	-	-	-	0
Eagles	-	-	-	-	0

at Phil Simms Stadium • Morehead, KY

- Date: November 1
- Game time: 1:00 PM EDT

Statistics	DAV	MORE
First downs		
Total yards		
Rushing yards		
Passing yards		
Passing: Comp–Att–Int		
Time of possession		

Team	Category	Player	Statistics
Davidson	Passing		
Davidson	Rushing		
Davidson	Receiving		
Morehead State	Passing		
Morehead State	Rushing		
Morehead State	Receiving		

=== No. 25 Presbyterian ===
No. 25 Presbyterian Blue Hose (8-1) vs. Davidson Wildcats (1-8) – Game summary

Quarter	1	2	3	4	Total
No. 25 Blue Hose	-	-	-	-	0
Wildcats	-	-	-	-	0

at Davidson College Stadium • Davidson, NC

- Date: November 8
- Game time: 5:00 PM EST

Statistics	PRES	DAV
First downs		
Total yards		
Rushing yards		
Passing yards		
Passing: Comp–Att–Int		
Time of possession		

Team	Category	Player	Statistics
Presbyterian	Passing		
Presbyterian	Rushing		
Presbyterian	Receiving		
Davidson	Passing		
Davidson	Rushing		
Davidson	Receiving		

=== at Marist ===
Davidson Wildcats (0-0) vs. Marist Red Foxes (0-0) – Game summary

Quarter	1	2	3	4	Total
Wildcats	-	-	-	-	0
Red Foxes	-	-	-	-	0

at Leonidoff Field • Poughkeepsie, NY

- Date: November 15
- Game time: 1:00 PM EST

Statistics	DAV	MRST
First downs		
Total yards		
Rushing yards		
Passing yards		
Passing: Comp–Att–Int		
Time of possession		

Team	Category	Player	Statistics
Davidson	Passing		
Davidson	Rushing		
Davidson	Receiving		
Marist	Passing		
Marist	Rushing		
Marist	Receiving		

=== Dayton ===
Dayton Flyers (0-0) vs. Davidson Wildcats (0-0) – Game summary

Quarter	1	2	3	4	Total
Flyers	-	-	-	-	0
Wildcats	-	-	-	-	0

at Davidson College Stadium • Davidson, NC

- Date: November 22
- Game time: 1:00 PM EST

Statistics	DAY	DAV
First downs		
Total yards		
Rushing yards		
Passing yards		
Passing: Comp–Att–Int		
Time of possession		

Team	Category	Player	Statistics
Dayton	Passing		
Dayton	Rushing		
Dayton	Receiving		
Davidson	Passing		
Davidson	Rushing		
Davidson	Receiving		
