= 2025 Drake Bulldogs football team =

American college football season

2025 Drake Bulldogs football

PFL champion

NCAA Division I First Round, L 17–38 vs. South Dakota
- Conference: Pioneer Football League
- Record: 8–4 (7–1 PFL)
- Head coach: Joe Woodley (1st season)
- Offensive coordinator: Kyle Kempt (1st season)
- Defensive coordinator: Adam Cox (1st season)
- Home stadium: Drake Stadium

2025 Pioneer Football League standings
	Conf.			Overall
Team	W		L	W		L
Drake $^	7	–	1	8	–	4
Presbyterian	6	–	2	10	–	2
San Diego	6	–	2	8	–	4
St. Thomas	5	–	3	7	–	5
Dayton	5	–	3	7	–	4
Morehead State	4	–	4	6	–	6
Butler	4	–	4	6	–	6
Marist	3	–	5	5	–	7
Stetson	2	–	6	3	–	9
Davidson	1	–	7	2	–	10
Valparaiso	1	–	7	2	–	10
$ – Conference champion; ^ – FCS playoff participant; Rankings from STATS Poll

The 2025 Drake Bulldogs football team represented Drake University as a member of the Pioneer Football League (PFL) during the 2025 NCAA Division I FCS football season. The Bulldogs were led by first-year head coach Joe Woodley, who took over for former coach Todd Stepsis who left the program to become the head coach at Northern Iowa. Woodley was assisted by first-year offensive coordinator Kyle Kempt and first-year defensive coordinator Adam Cox. The Bulldogs played home games at Drake Stadium in Des Moines, Iowa.

== Schedule ==
Date	Time	Opponent	Site	TV	Result	Attendance
August 28	6:30 p.m.	Upper Iowa*	Drake Stadium; Des Moines, IA	ESPN+	W 41–7	3,891
September 13	6:00 p.m.	at No. 2 South Dakota State*	Dana J. Dykhouse Stadium; Brookings, SD	ESPN+	L 21–37	19,213
September 20	1:00 p.m.	at No. 15 South Dakota*	DakotaDome; Vermillion, SD	ESPN+	L 21–42	7,441
October 4	12:00 p.m.	Valparaiso	Drake Stadium; Des Moines, IA	ESPN+	W 41–0	4,007
October 11	4:00 p.m.	at San Diego	Torero Stadium; San Diego, CA	ESPN+	W 19–16	2,794
October 18	12:00 p.m.	Davidson	Drake Stadium; Des Moines, IA	ESPN+	W 45–0	2,721
October 25	11:00 a.m.	at Marist	Tenney Stadium at Leonidoff Field; Poughkeepsie, NY	ESPN+	W 31–17	1,942
November 1	12:00 p.m.	at Butler	Bud and Jackie Sellick Bowl; Indianapolis, IN	FloFootball	W 24–19	2,062
November 8	12:00 p.m.	St. Thomas	Drake Stadium; Des Moines, IA	ESPN+	L 13–20	2,006
November 15	11:00 a.m.	at Dayton	Welcome Stadium; Dayton, OH	YouTube	W 14–6	3,178
November 22	12:00 p.m.	Morehead State	Drake Stadium; Des Moines, IA	ESPN+	W 17–10	2,267
November 29	12:00 p.m.	at No. 12 South Dakota*	DakotaDome; Vermillion, SD (NCAA Division I First Round)	ESPN+	L 17–38	3,964
*Non-conference game; Rankings from STATS Poll released prior to the game; All times are in Central time

== Game summaries ==
=== Upper Iowa (DII) ===
Upper Iowa Peacocks (0-0) vs. Drake Bulldogs (0-0) – Game summary

Quarter	1	2	3	4	Total
Peacocks (DII)	0	0	7	0	7
Bulldogs	14	10	7	10	41

at Drake Stadium • Des Moines, IA

- Date: August 28
- Game time: 6:30 p.m.
- Game attendance: 3,891
- TV: ESPN+

Game information

First Quarter

- 7:41 Drake – Hank Foley 27-yard pass from Chase Spellman (Harry Balke kick) (Drive: 5 plays, 88 yards, 1:35; Drake 7–0)
- 3:23 Drake – Chase Spellman 28-yard run (Harry Balke kick) (Drive: 3 plays, 63 yards, 0:58; Drake 14–0)

Second Quarter

- 12:19 Drake – Hank Foley 46-yard pass from Chase Spellman (Harry Balke kick) (Drive: 1 play, 46 yards, 0:08; Drake 21–0)
- 0:08 Drake – Harry Balke 42-yard field goal (Drive: 15 plays, 51 yards, 6:27; Drake 24–0)

Third Quarter

- 12:23 UPP – Mante Morrow 34-yard pass from Darryl Overstreet Jr. (Nathan Behne kick) (Drive: 5 plays, 75 yards, 2:37; Drake 24–7)
- 6:43 Drake – Chase Spellman 6-yard run (Harry Balke kick) (Drive: 11 plays, 83 yards, 5:33; Drake 31–7)

Fourth Quarter

- 14:19 Drake – Harry Balke 21-yard field goal (Drive: 7 plays, 16 yards, 3:38; Drake 34–7)
- 6:37 Drake – Jaden Meizinger 22-yard pass from Xaiver Washington (Harry Balke kick) (Drive: 6 plays, 79 yards, 2:49; Drake 41–7)

Statistics	UPP	DRKE
First downs	12	25
Total yards	217	479
Rushing yards	16	201
Passing yards	201	278
Passing: Comp–Att–Int	18–30–2	16–21–1
Time of possession	24:27	35:33

Team	Category	Player	Statistics
Upper Iowa	Passing	Darryl Overstreet Jr.	15/26, 174 yards, 1 TD, 2 INT
Upper Iowa	Rushing	Calvin Swinney; Damon Head Jr.	5 carries, 11 yards 5 carries, 11 yards
Upper Iowa	Receiving	Mante Morrow	5 receptions, 85 yards, 1 touchdown
Drake	Passing	Chase Spelllman	14/16, 233 yards, 2 TD, 1 INT
Drake	Rushing	Jaden Meizinger	14 carries, 51 yards
Drake	Receiving	Hank Foley	5 receptions, 127 yards, 2 TD

=== at No. 2 South Dakota State ===
Drake Bulldogs (1-0) vs. No. 2 South Dakota State Jackrabbits (2-0) – Game summary

Quarter	1	2	3	4	Total
Bulldogs	7	3	8	3	21
No. 2 Jackrabbits	14	7	10	6	37

at Dana J. Dykhouse Stadium • Brookings, SD

- Date: September 13
- Game time: 6:00 p.m.
- Game weather: Sunny • Temperature: 85 °F (29 °C) • Wind: S at 5 miles per hour (8.0 km/h)
- Game attendance: 19,213
- Referee: Jason Perkins
- TV announcers (ESPN+): Tom Nieman (play-by-play), Kurtiss Riggs (analyst) and Darron Wallace (sideline)

Game information

First Quarter

- (12:53) DRKE – Hank Foley 31-yard pass from Xavier Washington, Harry Balke kick (Drive: 5 plays, 75 yards, 2:07; Drake 7-0)
- (6:34) SDST – Alex Bullock 9-yard pass from Chase Mason, Eli Stader kick (Drive: 3 plays, 40 yards, 1:03; 7-7)
- (5:59) SDST – Julius Loughridge 15-yard run, Eli Stader kick (Drive: 2 plays, 19 yards, 0:35; South Dakota State 14-7)

Second Quarter

- (14:56) DRKE – Harry Balke 41-yard field goal (Drive: 5 plays, 24 yards, 2:13; South Dakota State 14-10)
- (5:59) SDST – James Basinger 2-yard run, Eli Stader kick (Drive: 12 plays, 66 yards, 6:41; South Dakota State 21-10)

Third Quarter

- (11:09) SDST – Julius Loughridge 4-yard run, Eli Stader kick (Drive: 8 plays, 65 yards, 3:51; South Dakota State 28-10)
- (7:28) DRKE – Logan Inagawa 3-yard run, Nick Herman pass to Logan Inagawa for two-point conversion (Drive: 7 plays, 75 yards, 3:41; South Dakota State 28-18)
- (1:57) SDST – Ryan Harrington 39-yard field goal (Drive: 5 plays, 24 yards, 2:13; South Dakota State 31-18)

Fourth Quarter

- (8:10) SDST – Corey Blair Jr. 5-yard run, two-point pass conversion failed (Drive: 10 plays, 59 yards, 5:05; South Dakota State 37-18)
- (0:04) DRKE – Harry Balke 24-yard field goal (Drive: 18 plays, 68 yards, 8:06; South Dakota State 37-21)

)

Statistics	DRKE	SDST
First downs	18	23
Total yards	295	436
Rushing yards	121	211
Passing yards	174	225
Passing: Comp–Att–Int	18–29–1	18–25–0
Time of possession	27:30	32:30

Team	Category	Player	Statistics
Drake	Passing	Logan Inagawa	15/25, 140 yards, 1 INT
Drake	Rushing	Logan Inagawa	14 carries, 58 yards, 1 TD
Drake	Receiving	Hank Foley	3 receptions, 57 yards, 1 TD
South Dakota State	Passing	Chase Mason	18/25, 225 yards, 1 TD
South Dakota State	Rushing	Julius Loughbridge	20 carries, 83 yards, 2 TD
South Dakota State	Receiving	Lofton O'Groske	6 receptions, 78 yards

=== at No. 15 South Dakota ===
Drake Bulldogs (1–1) vs. No. 15 South Dakota Coyotes (1–2) – Game summary

Quarter	1	2	3	4	Total
Bulldogs	0	7	0	14	21
No. 15 Coyotes	7	21	14	0	42

at DakotaDome • Vermillion, SD

- Date: September 20
- Game time: 1:00 p.m.
- Game weather: Indoor
- Game attendance: 7,441
- Referee: David Hergert
- TV announcers (ESPN+): Jay Elsen (play-by-play) and Andre Fields (analyst)

Game information

First Quarter

- (9:27) SDAK – L. J. Phillips Jr. 2-yard Run, Will Leyland Kick (Drive: 7 plays, 69 yards, 3:33; South Dakota 0–7)

Second Quarter

- (14:51) SDAK – L.J. Phillips Jr. 2-yard Run, Will Leyland Kick (Drive: 10 plays, 90 yards, 5:23; South Dakota 0–14)
- (7:07) DRKE – Logan Inagawa 1-yard Run, Harry Balke Kick (Drive: 8 plays, 59 yards, 4:40; South Dakota 7–14)
- (5:28) SDAK – Larenzo Fennder 70-yard pass from Aidan Bouman, Will Leyland Kick (Drive: 3 plays, 70 yards, 1:33; South Dakota 7–21)
- (0:55) SDAK – Larenzo 31-yard pass from Aidan Bouman, Will Leyland Kick (Drive: 7 plays, 76 yards, 2:55; South Dakota 7–28)

Third Quarter

- (10:46) SDAK – L.J. Phillips Jr. 2-yard run, Will Leyland Kick (Drive: 7 plays, 58 yards, 4:08; South Dakota 7–35)
- (8:29) SDAK – L.J. Phillips Jr. 50-yard Run, Will Leyland Kick (Drive: 1 play, 50 yards, 0:10; South Dakota 7–42)

Fourth Quarter

- (12:20) DRKE – Logan Inagawa 1-yard Run, Harry Balke Kick (Drive: 12 plays, 72 yards, 5:44; South Dakota 14–42)
- (2:48) DRKE – Chase Schutty 6-yard pass from Logan Inagawa, Harry Balke Kick (Drive: 11 plays, 93 yards, 6:10; South Dakota 21–42)

Statistics	DRKE	SDAK
First downs	20	21
Total yards	302	508
Rushing yards	138	282
Passing yards	164	226
Passing: Comp–Att–Int	15–20–2	13–20–0
Time of possession	30:39	29:21

Team	Category	Player	Statistics
Drake	Passing	L. Inagawa	15/19, 164 yards, 1 TD, 2 INT
Drake	Rushing	Logan Inagawa	19 carries, 73 yards, 2 TD
Drake	Receiving	Jackson Voth	6 catches, 85 yards
South Dakota	Passing	Aidan Bouman	13/20, 226 yards, 2 TD
South Dakota	Rushing	L. J. Phillips Jr.	19 carries, 143 yards, 4 TD
South Dakota	Receiving	Larenzo Fenner	2 catches, 101 yards

=== Valparaiso ===
Valparaiso Beacons (1-3) vs. Drake Bulldogs (1-2) – Game summary

Quarter	1	2	3	4	Total
Beacons	0	0	0	0	0
Bulldogs	3	10	21	7	41

at Drake Stadium • Des Moines, IA

- Date: October 4
- Game time: 12:00 p.m. CDT
- Game attendance: 4,007
- Referee: Carl Chapman
- TV announcers (ESPN+): Michael Admire (play-by-play) and Sage Rosenfels (analyst)

Game information

First Quarter

- (9:17) DRKE – Harry Balke 34-yard Field Goal (Drive: 7 plays, 70 yards, 2:46; Drake 0–3)

Second Quarter

- (10:39) DRKE – Luke Woodson 2-yard Run, Harry Balke Kick (Drive: 5 plays, 31 yards, 2:47; Drake 0–10)
- (1:39) DRKE – Harry Balke 38-yard Field Goal (Drive: 14 plays, 39 yards, 4:27; Drake 0–13)

Third Quarter

- (3:36) DRKE – Nick Herman 1-yard Run, Harry Balke Kick (Drive: 10 plays, 72 yards, 4:51; Drake 0–27)
- (0:52) DRKE – Nick Herman 27-yard Run, Harry Balke Kick (Drive: 2 plays, 37 yards, 0:43; Drake 0–34)

Fourth Quarter

- (3:32) DRKE – Hank Foley 25-yard pass from Logan Inagawa, Harry Balke Kick (Drive: 4 plays, 34 yards, 2:50; Drake 0–41)

Statistics	VAL	DRKE
First downs	11	19
Total yards	105	334
Rushing yards	32	150
Passing yards	73	184
Passing: Comp–Att–Int	10–23–3	16–26–1
Time of possession	28:52	31:08

Team	Category	Player	Statistics
Valparaiso	Passing	Tyler Caron	5/9, 42 yards
Valparaiso	Rushing	Dawaiian McNeeley	12 carries, 23 yards
Valparaiso	Receiving	Devin Yeats	4 catches, 34 yards
Drake	Passing	Chase Spellman	10/19, 128 yards, 1 INT
Drake	Rushing	Nick Herman	7 carries, 53 yards, 2 TD
Drake	Receiving	Taj Hughes	3 catches, 74 yards

=== at San Diego ===
Drake Bulldogs (2-2) vs. San Diego Toreros (3-3) – Game summary

Quarter	1	2	3	4	Total
Bulldogs	0	7	0	12	19
Toreros	6	7	0	3	16

at Torero Stadium • San Diego, CA

- Date: October 11
- Game time: 4:00 p.m. CDT
- Game weather: Sunny
- Game attendance: 2,794
- Referee: Kelly Holman
- TV announcers (ESPN+): Jack Cronin (play-by-play) and George Whitfield Jr. (analyst)

Game information

First Quarter

- (7:18) USD – Emiliano Salazar 25-yard Field Goal (Drive: 13 plays, 59 yards, 4:57; San Diego 0–3)
- (2:11) USD – Emiliano Salazar 47-yard Field Goal (Drive: 10 plays, 35 yards, 3:49; San Diego 0–6)

Second Quarter

- (3:53) DRKE – Luke Woodson 33-yard Run, Harry Balke Kick (Drive: 2 plays, 54 yards, 0:29; Drake 7–6)
- (2:35) USD – Cole Monach 73-yard pass from Yosei Takahashi, Emiliano Salazar Kick (Drive: 3 plays, 75 yards, 1:18; San Diego 7–13)

Fourth Quarter

- (14:56) DRKE – Harry Balke 43-yard Field Goal (Drive: 11 plays, 54 yards, 5:37; San Diego 10–13)
- (4:38) DRKE – Logan Inagawa 5-yard Run, Harry Balke PAT failed (Drive: 8 plays, 67 yards, 3:44; Drake 16–13)
- (1:09) USD – Emiliano Salazar 41-yard Field Goal (Drive: 10 plays, 41 yards, 3:29; Tied 16–16)
- (0:00) DRKE – Harry Balke 55-yard Field Goal (Drive: 7 plays, 27 yards, 1:09; Drake 19–16)

Statistics	DRKE	USD
First downs	18	16
Total yards	341	314
Rushing yards	180	132
Passing yards	161	182
Passing: Comp–Att–Int	16–25–0	15–29–0
Time of possession	30:03	29:57

Team	Category	Player	Statistics
Drake	Passing	Chase Spellman	14/21, 128 yards
Drake	Rushing	Nick Herman	15 carries, 96 yards
Drake	Receiving	Hank Foley	1 reception, 36 yards
San Diego	Passing	Tyler Voss	14/28, 109 yards
San Diego	Rushing	Adam Criter	28 carries, 108 yards
San Diego	Receiving	Cole Monach	2 receptions, 82 yards, TD

=== Davidson ===
Davidson Wildcats (1-5) vs. Drake Bulldogs (3-2) – Game summary

Quarter	1	2	3	4	Total
Wildcats	0	0	0	0	0
Bulldogs	21	10	7	7	45

at Drake Stadium • Des Moines, IA

- Date: October 18
- Game time: 12:00 PM CDT
- Game attendance: 2,721
- TV: ESPN+
- Box Score

Game information

First Quarter

- (8:20) DRKE – Nick Herman 24-yard Run, Harry Balke Kick (Drive: 2 plays, 34 yards, 0:38; Drake 0–7)
- (5:00) DRKE – Hank Foley 12-yard Run, Harry Balke Kick (Drive: 5 plays, 55 yards, 1:42; Drake 0–14)
- (1:58) DRKE – Taj Hughes 2-yard pass from Logan Inagawa, Harry Balke Kick (Drive: 4 plays, 73 yards, 1:12; Drake 0–21)

Second Quarter

- (8:24) DRKE – Harry Balke 29-yard Field Goal (Drive: 13 plays, 82 yards, 5:55; Drake 0–24)
- (1:25) DRKE – Jackson Voth 5-yard pass from Logan Inagawa, Harry Balke Kick (Drive: 7 plays, 55 yards, 3:19; Drake 0–31)

Third Quarter

- (7:43) DRKE – Jackson Voth 29-yard pass from Logan Inagawa, Harry Balke Kick (Drive: 8 plays, 80 yards, 4:06; Drake 0–38)

Fourth Quarter

- (8:38) DRKE – Jaden Meizinger 6-yard Run, Harry Balke Kick (Drive, 10 plays, 90 yards, 5:52; Drake 0–45)

Statistics	DAV	DRKE
First downs	20	31
Total yards	283	570
Rushing yards	31	377
Passing yards	252	193
Passing: Comp–Att–Int	22–41–0	17–23–0
Time of possession	28:11	31:49

Team	Category	Player	Statistics
Davidson	Passing	Coulter Cleland	22/41, 252 yards
Davidson	Rushing	Mari Adams	8 carries, 29 yards
Davidson	Receiving	Ivan Hoyt	12 receptions, 148 yards
Drake	Passing	Logan Inagawa	16/22 186 yards, 3 TD
Drake	Rushing	Nick Herman	14 carries, 134 yards, TD
Drake	Receiving	Jackson Voth	8 receptions, 106 yards, 2 TD

=== at Marist ===
Drake Bulldogs (4-2) vs. Marist Red Foxes (3-4) – Game summary

Quarter	1	2	3	4	Total
Bulldogs	7	10	7	7	31
Red Foxes	0	14	3	0	17

at Leonidoff Field • Poughkeepsie, NY

- Date: October 25
- Game time: 11:00 AM CDT
- Game attendance: 1,942
- TV: ESPN+

Game information

First Quarter

- (7:51) DRKE – Jackson Voth 8-yard pass from Logan Inagawa, Harry Balke Kick (Drive: 14 plays, 72 yards, 7:04; Drake 7–0)

Second Quarter

- (14:48) DRKE – Harry Balke 21-yard Field Goal (Drive: 12 plays, 87 yards, 5:48; Drake 10–0)
- (8:50) MRST – Tristan Shannon 1-yard Run, Samer Layous Kick (Drive: 10 plays, 75 yards, 5:53; Drake 10–7)
- (7:33) DRKE – Logan Inagawa 8-yard Run, Harry Balke Kick (Drive: 3 plays, 35 yards, 1:12; Drake 17–7)
- (0:30) MRST – Tristan Shannon 5-yard Run, Samer Layous Kick (Drive: 16 plays, 81 yards, 6:57; Drake 17–14)

Third Quarter

- (10:10) MRST – Samer Layous 41-yard Field Goal (Drive: 10 plays, 44 yards, 4:44; Tied 17–17)
- (4:59) DRKE – Luke Woodson 3-yard Run, Harry Balke Kick (Drive: 2 plays, 4 yards, 0:46; Drake 24–17)

Fourth Quarter

- (12:56) DRKE – Taj Hughes 11-yard pass from Logan Inagawa, Harry Balke Kick (Drive: 9 plays, 84 yards, 4:33; Drake 31–17)

Statistics	DRKE	MRST
First downs	18	21
Total yards	352	329
Rushing yards	189	144
Passing yards	163	185
Passing: Comp–Att–Int	6–11–0	4–12–1
Time of possession	28:57	31:03

Team	Category	Player	Statistics
Drake	Passing	Logan Inagawa	10/13, 163 yards, 2 TD
Drake	Rushing	Logan Inagawa	17 carries, 81 yards, TD
Drake	Receiving	Taj Hughes	7 receptions, 106 yards, TD
Marist	Passing	Sonny Mannino	17/28, 161 yards
Marist	Rushing	Tristan Shannon	8 carries, 58 yards, 2 TD
Marist	Receiving	Lance Martinez	5 receptions, 61 yards

=== at Butler ===
Drake Bulldogs (5-2) vs. Butler Bulldogs (5-3) – Game summary

Quarter	1	2	3	4	Total
Drake	7	7	3	7	24
Butler	7	0	6	6	19

at Bud and Jackie Sellick Bowl • Indianapolis, IN

- Date: November 1
- Game time: 1:00 PM EDT
- Game weather: Sunny • Temperature: 51 °F (11 °C)
- Game attendance: 2,062
- Referee: Jason Berg
- TV: FloSports

Game information

First Quarter

- (14:44) DRKE – Nick Herman 66-yard run, Harry Balke kick (Drive: 1 play, 66 yards, 0:10; Drake 7–0)
- (7:08) BUT – Archie Cox 54-yard pass from Reagan Andrew, Ryan Short kick (Drive: 3 plays, 80 yards, 1:24; Tied 7–7)

Second Quarter

- (2:35) DRKE – Jackson Voth 11-yard pass from Logan Inagawa, Harry Balke kick (Drive: 11 plays, 96 yards, 6:11; Drake 14–7)

Third Quarter

- (9:38) BUT – Chet Yardley 3-yard pass from Reagan Andrew, Ryan Short kick blocked (Drive: 9 plays, 75 yards, 5:22; Drake 14–13)
- (6:01) DRKE – Harry Balke 51-yard field goal (Drive: 7 plays, 31 yards, 3:34; Drake 17–13)

Fourth Quarter

- (10:52) DRKE – Luke Woodson 1-yard run, Harry Balke kick (Drive: 8 plays, 34 yards, 4:01; Drake 24–13)
- (7:10) BUT – Reagan Andrew 3-yard run, two-point conversion failed (Drive: 7 plays, 73 yards, 3:38; Drake 24–19)

Statistics	DRKE	BUT
First downs	16	16
Total yards	363	353
Rushing yards	119	162
Passing yards	244	191
Passing: Comp–Att–Int	18–24–0	14–21–1
Time of possession	35:04	24:56

Team	Category	Player	Statistics
Drake	Passing	Logan Inagawa	18/23, 244 yards, TD
Drake	Rushing	Nick Herman	19 carries, 113 yards, TD
Drake	Receiving	Taj Hughes	7 receptions, 104 yards
Butler	Passing	Reagan Andrew	14/21, 191 yards, 2 TD, INT
Butler	Rushing	Ethan Loss	4 carries, 57 yards
Butler	Receiving	Archie Cox	4 receptions, 107 yards, TD

=== St. Thomas (MN) ===
St. Thomas Tommies (6-3) vs. Drake Bulldogs (6-2) – Game summary

Quarter	1	2	3	4	Total
Tommies	7	3	7	3	20
Bulldogs	0	10	0	3	13

at Drake Stadium • Des Moines, IA

- Date: November 8
- Game time: 12:00 p.m. CDT
- TV: ESPN+

Game information

First Quarter

- (2:51) STMN – Stefano Giovannelli 6-yard Run, Ben Hoiland Kick (Drive: 14 plays, 85 yards, 7:04; St. Thomas 7–0)

Second Quarter

- (14:56) DRKE – Logan Inagawa 2-yard Run, Harry Balke Kick (Drive: 5 plays, 77 yards, 2:48; Tied 7–7)
- (3:54) STMN – Ben Hoiland 25-yard Field Goal (Drive: 10 plays, 45 yards, 5:05; St. Thomas 10–7)
- (0:02) DRKE – Harry Balke 35-yard Field Goal (Drive: 9 plays, 49 yards, 3:48; Tied 10–10)

Third Quarter

- (0:45) STMN – Gabriel Abel 2-yard Run, Ben Hoiland Kick (Drive: 6 plays, 45 yards, 3:30; St. Thomas 17–10)

Fourth Quarter

- (10:17) DRKE – Harry Balke 41-yard Field Goal (Drive: 11 plays, 48 yards, 5:20; St. Thomas 17–13)
- (3:26) STMN – Ben Hoiland 20-yard Field Goal (Drive: 13 plays, 64 yards, 6:43; St. Thomas 20–13)

Statistics	STMN	DRKE
First downs	16	16
Total yards	252	315
Rushing yards	131	161
Passing yards	121	154
Passing: Comp–Att–Int	13–21–0	14–22–1
Time of possession	32:19	27:41

Team	Category	Player	Statistics
St. Thomas (MN)	Passing	Andy Peters	13/21, 121 yards
St. Thomas (MN)	Rushing	Andy Peters	15 carries, 66 yards
St. Thomas (MN)	Receiving	Quentin Cobb-Butler	5 receptions, 35 yards
Drake	Passing	Logan Inagawa	14/22, 154 yards, INT
Drake	Rushing	Nick Herman	12 carries, 60 yards
Drake	Receiving	Taj Hughes	8 receptions, 55 yards

=== at Dayton ===
Drake Bulldogs (6-3) vs. Dayton Flyers (6-3) – Game summary

Quarter	1	2	3	4	Total
Bulldogs	0	14	0	0	14
Flyers	0	0	0	6	6

at Welcome Stadium • Dayton, OH

- Date: November 15
- Game time: 12:00 PM EST
- Game attendance: 3,178
- TV: YouTube

Game information

Second Quarter

- (12:16) DRKE – Logan Inagawa 3-yard Run, Harry Balke Kick (Drive: 11 plays, 99 yards, 4:43; Drake 7–0)
- (8:49) DRKE – Nick Herman 66-yard Run, Harry Balke Kick (Drive: 2 plays, 69 yards, 0:48; Drake 14–0)

Fourth Quarter

- (8:40) DAY – Michael Mussari 23-yard pass from Liam Poronsky, Trevor Henkle PAT failed (Drive: 14 plays, 93 yards, 5:48; Drake 14–6)

Statistics	DRKE	DAY
First downs	15	20
Total yards	307	340
Rushing yards	248	143
Passing yards	59	197
Passing: Comp–Att–Int	7–12–0	17–37–2
Time of possession	25:54	34:06

Team	Category	Player	Statistics
Drake	Passing	Logan Inagawa	7/12, 59 yards
Drake	Rushing	Nick Herman	15 carries, 153 yards, TD
Drake	Receiving	Taj Hughes	3 receptions, 44 yards
Dayton	Passing	Liam Poronsky	12/22, 107 yards, TD
Dayton	Rushing	Gavin Lochow	17 carries, 101 yards
Dayton	Receiving	Gavin Lochow	4 receptions, 63 yards

=== Morehead State ===
Morehead State Eagles (6-5) vs. Drake Bulldogs (0-0) – Game summary

Quarter	1	2	3	4	Total
Eagles	7	0	0	3	10
Bulldogs	0	3	0	14	17

at Drake Stadium • Des Moines, IA

- Date: November 22
- Game time: 12:00 PM CST
- Game attendance: 2,267
- TV: ESPN+

Game information

First Quarter

- (5:05) MORE – Isaac Stopke 42-yard Run, Jordan Price Kick (Drive: 5 plays, 80 yards, 2:55; Morehead State 7–0)

Second Quarter

- (1:55) DRKE – Harry Balke 25-yard Field Goal (Drive: 16 plays, 79 yards, 8:41; Morehead State 7–3)

Fourth Quarter

- (6:53) DRKE – Logan Inagawa 8-yard Run, Harry Balke Kick (Drive: 14 plays, 90 yards, 7:07; Drake 7–10)
- (3:05) DRKE – Nick Herman 77-yard Run, Harry Balke Kick (Drive: 1 play, 77 yards, 0:14; Drake 7–17)
- (0:22) MORE – Thomas Schwartz V 20-yard Field Goal (Drive: 14 plays, 30 yards, 2:36; Drake 10–17)

Statistics	MORE	DRKE
First downs	19	19
Total yards	325	368
Rushing yards	135	323
Passing yards	190	45
Passing: Comp–Att–Int	18–26–0	7–12–0
Time of possession	31:37	28:23

Team	Category	Player	Statistics
Morehead State	Passing	Carter Cravens	18/26, 190 yards
Morehead State	Rushing	Isaac Stopke	23 carries, 130 yards, TD
Morehead State	Receiving	Ryan Upp	9 receptions, 90 yards
Drake	Passing	Logan Inagawa	7/12, 45 yards
Drake	Rushing	Nick Herman	27 carries, 253 yards, TD
Drake	Receiving	Hank Foley	1 reception, 16 yards

=== NCAA Division I playoffs ===
==== at No. 12 South Dakota (First Round) ====
2025 NCAA Division I FCS Playoffs First Round
Drake (8–3) vs. No. 12 South Dakota Coyotes (8–4) – Game summary

Quarter	1	2	3	4	Total
Bulldogs	3	7	0	7	17
No. 12 Coyotes	3	14	14	7	38

at DakotaDome, Vermillion, SD

- Date: November 29
- Game time: 12:00 p.m.
- Game weather: Indoors, 72 °F (22 °C)
- Game attendance: 3,964
- Referee: Cory Hanson
- TV announcers (ESPN+): Jason Ross Jr. (play-by-play) and Tyoka Jackson (analyst)

Game information
First quarter
- (9:12) DRKE – Harry Balke 48-yard field goal (Drive: 11 plays, 44 yards, 5:48; DRKE 3–0)
- (5:04) SDAK – Will Leyland 36-yard field goal (Drive: 8 plays, 41 yards, 4:02; Tied 3–3)

Second quarter

- (10:12) SDAK – Larenzo Fenner 23-yard pass from Aidan Bouman, Will Leyland kick (Drive: 12 plays, 70 yards, 7:19; SDAK 10–3)
- (4:49) DRKE – Logan Inagawa 2-yard run, Harry Balke kick (Drive: 10 plays, 75 yards, 5:23; Tied 10–10)
- (2:26) SDAK – L. J. Phillips Jr. 1-yard run, Will Leyland kick (Drive: 4 plays, 75 yards, 2:23; SDAK 17–10)

Third quarter

- (14:03) SDAK — Larenzo Fenner 27-yard pass from Aidan Bouman, Will Leyland kick (Drive: 2 plays, 29 yards, 0:46; SDAK 24–10)
- (4:29) SDAK — Larenzo Fenner 18-yard pass from Aidan Bouman, Will Leyland kick (Drive: 5 plays, 97 yards, 2:10; SDAK 31–10)

Fourth quarter

- (9:23) SDAK – Jack Martens 3-yard pass from Aidan Bouman, Will Leyland kick (Drive: 7 plays, 73 yards, 4:03; SDAK 38–10)
- (0:09) DRKE – Jackson Voth 6-yard pass from Logan Inagawa, Harry Balke kick (Drive: 11 plays, 65 yards, 3:47; SDAK 38–17)

Statistics	DRKE	SDAK
First downs	26	19
Total yards	330	418
Rushing yards	168	157
Passing yards	162	261
Passing: Comp–Att–Int	20–32–0	15–20–0
Time of possession	35:24	24:36

Team	Category	Player	Statistics
Drake	Passing	Logan Inagawa	19/31, 149 yards, TD
Drake	Rushing	Nick Herman	13 carries, 74 yards
Drake	Receiving	Jackson Voth	10 receptions, 86 yards, TD
South Dakota	Passing	Aidan Bouman	15/20, 261 yards, 4 TD
South Dakota	Rushing	L. J. Phillips Jr.	14 carries, 132 yards, TD
South Dakota	Receiving	Larenzo Fenner	5 receptions, 115 yards, 3 TD
