= Saj Thakkar =

American football coach (born 1991)

Current position
- Title: Head coach
- Team: Davidson
- Conference: PFL
- Record: 4–12

Biographical details
- Born: February 7, 1991 (age 35); Wakefield, Massachusetts, U.S.
- Education: Fitchburg State University (2013, 2015)

Playing career
- 2009: Western New England
- 2010–2012: Fitchburg State
- Positions: Quarterback, wide receiver

Coaching career (HC unless noted)
- 2013–2014: Fitchburg State (ST/RB)
- 2015: Maritime (ST/DB)
- 2016–2017: Maritime (OC/QB)
- 2018–2022: Harvard (RB)
- 2023 (spring): Bentley (OC)
- 2023–2024: Bentley
- 2025–present: Davidson

Head coaching record
- Overall: 18–18

Sajan Thakkar (born February 7, 1991) is an American college football coach. He is the head football coach for Davidson College, a position he has held since 2025. He was the head football coach for Bentley University from 2023 to 2024. He also coached for Fitchburg State, Maritime, and Harvard. He played college football for Western New England and Fitchburg State as a quarterback and wide receiver.

== Personal life ==
Thakkar and his wife, Bobbi-Jo, have been married since 2017. They have two children.

== Head coaching record ==
Year	Team	Overall	Conference	Standing	Bowl/playoffs
Bentley Falcons (Northeast-10 Conference) (2023–2024)
2023	Bentley	6–4	5–2	T–2nd	
2024	Bentley	8–2	6–2	2nd	
Bentley:		14–6	11–4		
Davidson Wildcats (Pioneer Football League) (2025–present)
2025	Davidson	2–10	1–7		
2026	Davidson	2–2	0–0		
Davidson:		4–12	1–7		
Total:		18–18			
