= 2025 St. Thomas Tommies football team =

American college football season

2025 St. Thomas Tommies football
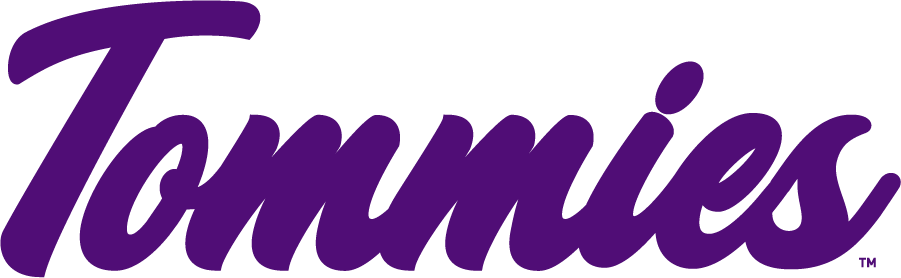
- Conference: Pioneer Football League
- Record: 7–5 (5–3 PFL)
- Head coach: Glenn Caruso (17th season)
- Offensive coordinator: Jay MacIntyre (1st season)
- Defensive coordinator: Wallie Kuchinski (17th season)
- Home stadium: O'Shaughnessy Stadium

2025 Pioneer Football League standings
	Conf.			Overall
Team	W		L	W		L
Drake $^	7	–	1	8	–	4
Presbyterian	6	–	2	10	–	2
San Diego	6	–	2	8	–	4
St. Thomas	5	–	3	7	–	5
Dayton	5	–	3	7	–	4
Morehead State	4	–	4	6	–	6
Butler	4	–	4	6	–	6
Marist	3	–	5	5	–	7
Stetson	2	–	6	3	–	9
Davidson	1	–	7	2	–	10
Valparaiso	1	–	7	2	–	10
$ – Conference champion; ^ – FCS playoff participant; Rankings from STATS Poll

The 2025 St. Thomas Tommies football team represented the University of St. Thomas during the 2025 NCAA Division I FCS football season as members of the Pioneer Football League (PFL). They were led by 17th-year head coach Glenn Caruso. The Tommies played their home games at O'Shaughnessy Stadium in Saint Paul, Minnesota. This season marked the first time St. Thomas was fully eligible for the FCS playoffs after completing their reclassification from Division III, based on meeting the academic criteria to expedite the process from 5 years to 4 years.

== Schedule ==
Date	Time	Opponent	Site	TV	Result	Attendance
August 28	6:00 pm	Lindenwood*	O'Shaughnessy Stadium; Saint Paul, MN	Midco Sports Plus	W 35–13	3,565
September 6	2:00 p.m.	at No. 10 Idaho*	Kibbie Dome; Moscow, ID	ESPN+	L 30–37	8,065
September 13	12:00 p.m.	at Northern Michigan*	Superior Dome; Marquette, MI	FloSports	W 20–7	2,180
September 27	3:00 p.m.	at San Diego	Torero Stadium; San Diego, CA	ESPN+	L 27–30	1,563
October 4	1:00 p.m.	Butler^{†}	O'Shaughnessy Stadium; Saint Paul, MN	Midco Sports Plus	L 14–21 ^{OT}	5,274
October 11	12:00 p.m.	at Davidson	Davidson College Stadium; Davidson, NC	ESPN+	W 57–13	
October 18	1:00 p.m.	Valparaiso	O'Shaughnessy Stadium; Saint Paul, MN	Midco Sports Plus	W 55–17	3,623
October 25	12:00 p.m.	at Stetson	Spec Martin Stadium; DeLand, FL	ESPN+	W 52–10	2,024
November 1	1:00 p.m.	Marist	O'Shaughnessy Stadium; Saint Paul, MN	Midco Sports Plus	W 45–0	2,150
November 8	12:00 p.m.	at Drake	Drake Stadium; Des Moines, IA	ESPN+	W 20–13	
November 15	1:00 p.m.	Presbyterian	O'Shaughnessy Stadium; Saint Paul, MN	Midco Sports Plus	L 9–23	2,375
November 22	2:30 p.m.	at No. 1 North Dakota State*	Fargodome; Fargo, ND	ABC ND/ESPN+	L 7–62	15,278
*Non-conference game; ^{†}Homecoming; Rankings from STATS Poll released prior to the game; All times are in Central time

== Game summaries ==
=== Lindenwood ===
Game One – Lindenwood Lions (0–0) at St. Thomas Tommies (0–0) – Game summary

Quarter	1	2	3	4	Total
Lions	0	7	6	0	13
Tommies	0	7	14	14	35

at O'Shaughnessy Stadium • Saint Paul, MN

- Date: Thursday August 28, 2025
- Game time: 6:00 p.m.
- Game attendance: 3.565
- Referee: Joe Schmoe
- TV announcers (Midco Sports Plus): Corbu Stathes (play-by-play), Chris Ohm (analyst) and Allie Mosley (sideline)

Game information

First quarter

No scoring plays

Second quarter

- (5:13) STMN – Patrick Wagner 19 yard pass from Andy Peters, Elliot Huether kick (Drive: 5 plays, 78 yards, 2:37; STMN 7–0)
- (2:01) LIN – Jared Rhodes 1 yard run, Will Graham kick (Drive: 7 plays, 73 yards, 3:05; TIED 7–7)

Third quarter

- (12:13) STMN – Stefano Giovannelli 8 yard run, Elliot Huether kick (Drive: 7 plays, 48 yards, 2:35; STMN 14–7)
- (11:03) LIN – John Anthony 45 yard pass from Nate Glantz (Drive: 3 plays, 65 yards, 1:10; STMN 14–13)
- (8:44) STMN – JaShawn Todd 16 yard pass from Andy Peters, Elliot Huether kick (Drive: 6 plays, 83 yards, 2:13; STMN 21–13)

Fourth quarter

- (14:16) STMN – Joseph Koch 18 yard run, Elliot Huether kick (Drive: 6 plays, 43 yards, 3:37; STMN 28–13)
- (6:48) STMN – Zander Rockow 3 yard run, Elliot Huether kick (Drive: 10 plays, 40 yards, 6:00; STMN 35–13)

Statistics	LIN	STMN
First downs	22	23
Total yards	450	447
Rushing yards	132	275
Passing yards	318	172
Passing: Comp–Att–Int	18–30–0	11–19–0
Time of possession	30:43	29:17

Team	Category	Player	Statistics
Lindenwood	Passing	Nate Glantz	18/29, 318 yards, 1 TD
Lindenwood	Rushing	Steve Hall	14 carries, 70 yards
Lindenwood	Receiving	Drew Krobath	5 receptions, 128 yards
St. Thomas (MN)	Passing	Andy Peters	11/18, 172 yards, 2 TD
St. Thomas (MN)	Rushing	Joseph Koch	18 carries, 154 yards, 1 TD
St. Thomas (MN)	Receiving	Stefano Giovannelli	2 receptions, 51 yards

=== at No. 10 Idaho ===
Game Two – St. Thomas Tommies (1–0) at No. 10 Idaho Vandals (0–1) – Game summary

Quarter	1	2	3	4	Total
Tommies	7	6	3	14	30
No. 10 Vandals	3	20	0	14	37

at Kibbie Dome • Moscow, ID

- Date: September 6
- Game time: 1:00 PM PDT
- Game weather: Indoor • Temperature: 85 °F (29 °C)
- Game attendance: 8,540
- Referee: Jim Crowley
- TV announcers (ESPN+): Austin Getz (play-by-play) and Adam Shackleford (analyst)

Game information

First quarter

- IDHO - Cameron Pope 33-yard field goal, 5:13. Vandals 3-0. Drive: 11 plays, 64 yards, 6:34.
- STMN - Quentin Cobb-Butler 17-yard pass from Andy Peters (Elliot Huether kick), 0:57. Tommies 7-3. Drive: 8 plays, 65 yards, 4:16.

Second quarter

- IDHO - Rocco Koch 4-yard run (Cameron Pope kick), 11:40. Vandals 10-7. Drive: 8 plays, 68 yards, 4:08.
- STMN - Mariano Birdno 27-yard pass from Andy Peters (Two-point run conversion failed), 8:08. Tommies 13-10. Drive: 8 plays, 88 yards, 3:27.
- IDHO - Jake Cox 4-yard pass from Joshua Wood (Cameron Pope kick), 3:03. Vandals 17-13. Drive: 11 plays, 77 yards, 5:00.
- IDHO - Tony Harste 21-yard pass from Joshua Wood (Two-point run conversion failed), 0:16. Vandals 23-13. Drive: 6 plays, 38 yards, 1:40.

Third quarter

- STMN - Elliot Huether 44-yard field goal, 1:33. Vandals 23-16. Drive: 5 plays, 8 yards, 2:05.

Fourth quarter

- IDHO - Ryan Jezioro 42-yard pass from Joshua Wood (Cameron Pope PAT failed), 14:52. Vandals 29-16. Drive: 4 plays, 82 yards, 1:37.
- STMN - Patrick Bowen 38-yard run (Elliot Huether kick), 10:10. Vandals 29-23. Drive: 8 plays, 81 yards, 4:37.
- IDHO - Joshua Wood 59-yard run (Joshua Wood pass to Jake Cox for two-point conversion), 2:19. Vandals 37-23. Drive: 2 plays, 60 yards, 0:55.
- STMN - Patrick Wagner 6-yard pass from Andy Peters (Elliot Huether kick), 0:11. Vandals 37-30. Drive: 11 plays, 74 yards, 2:01.

Statistics	STMN	IDHO
First downs	26	22
Plays–yards	66–472	60–467
Rushes–yards	34–208	35–186
Passing yards	264	281
Passing: Comp–Att–Int	21-32-0	20-25-1
Turnovers	1	1
Time of possession	28:41	31:19

Team	Category	Player	Statistics
St. Thomas (MN)	Passing	Andy Peters	21/29, 264 yards, 3 TD
St. Thomas (MN)	Rushing	Andy Peters	11 carries, 79 yards
St. Thomas (MN)	Receiving	Patrick Wagner	6 receptions, 59 yards, TD
Idaho	Passing	Joshua Wood	20/25, 281 yards, 3 TD, INT
Idaho	Rushing	Joshua Wood	5 carries, 87 yards, TD
Idaho	Receiving	Tony Harste	5 receptions, 92 yards, TD

=== Butler ===
Butler Bulldogs (3-2) vs. St. Thomas Tommies (2-2) – Game summary

Quarter	1	2	3	4	OT	Total
Bulldogs	7	7	0	0	7	21
Tommies	7	0	0	7	0	14

at O'Shaughnessy Stadium • Saint Paul, MN

- Date: October 4
- Game time: 1:00 PM CDT
- Game weather: Sunny • Temperature: 84 °F (29 °C) • Wind: N at 16 miles per hour (26 km/h)
- Game attendance: 5,274
- TV announcers (Midco Sports Plus): Corbu Stathes (play-by-play), Chris Ohm (analyst) and Allie Mosley (sideline)
- Box Score

Game information

First Quarter

- (8:26) STMN – Quentin Cobb-Butler 29-yard pass from Andy Peters, Ben Hoiland kick (Drive: 11 plays, 75 yards, 6:34; St. Thomas 7–0)
- (3:16) BUT – Reagan Andrew 2-yard run, Ryan Short kick (Drive: 8 plays, 70 yards, 5:06; Tied 7–7)

Second Quarter

- (2:20) BUT – Reagan Andrew 1-yard run, Ryan Short kick (Drive: 15 plays, 80 yards, 8:51; Butler 14–7)

Third Quarter

No scoring plays

Fourth Quarter

- (10:10) STMN – Andy Peters 1-yard run, Ben Hoiland kick (Drive: 13 plays, 51 yards, 6:32; Tied 14–14)

Overtime

- BUT – Reagan Andrew 1-yard run, Ryan Short kick (Drive: 5 plays, 25 yards; Butler 21–14)

Statistics	BUT	STMN
First downs	20	22
Total yards	286	306
Rushing yards	129	113
Passing yards	157	193
Passing: Comp–Att–Int	17–22–0	16–27–2
Time of possession	32:34	27:26

Team	Category	Player	Statistics
Butler	Passing	Reagan Andrew	16/21, 141 yards
Butler	Rushing	Reagan Andrew	26 carries, 68 yards, 3 TD
Butler	Receiving	Nick Munson	4 receptions, 44 yards
St. Thomas (MN)	Passing	Andy Peters	16/27, 193 yards, TD, 2 INT
St. Thomas (MN)	Rushing	Pat Bowen	12 carries, 61 yards
St. Thomas (MN)	Receiving	Quentin Cobb-Butler	6 receptions, 69 yards, TD

=== at No. 1 North Dakota State ===
St. Thomas Tommies (7-4) vs. No. 1 North Dakota State Bison (11-0) – Game summary

Quarter	1	2	3	4	Total
Tommies	0	0	0	7	7
No. 1 Bison	28	17	14	3	62

at Fargodome • Fargo, ND

- Date: November 22
- Game time: 2:30 PM CST
- Game weather: Indoors • Temperature: 70 °F (21 °C)
- Game attendance: 15,278
- Referee: Tyler Downs
- TV announcers (ESPN+): Dom Izzo (play-by-play), Kyle Emanuel (analyst) and Sam Goetzinger (sideline)

Game information

First Quarter

- (12:32) NDSU – Barika Kpeenu 74-yard run, Eli Ozick kick (Drive: 2 plays, 82 yards, 0:48; North Dakota State 7–0)
- (9:35) NDSU – Barika Kpeenu 74-yard run, Eli Ozick kick (Drive: 4 plays, 62 yards, 2:08; North Dakota State 14–0)
- (5:58) NDSU – Bryce Lance 81-yard pass from Cole Payton, Eli Ozick kick (Drive: 3 plays, 82 yards, 0:47; North Dakota State 21–0)
- (2:51) NDSU – Barika Kpeenu 47-yard pass from Cole Payton, Eli Ozick kick (Drive: 3 plays, 64 yards, 1:28; North Dakota State 28–0)

Second Quarter

- (14:07) NDSU – Jackson Williams 43-yard pass from Cole Payton, Eli Ozick kick (Drive: 6 plays, 80 yards, 2:40; North Dakota State 35–0)
- (7:14) NDSU – Eli Ozick 38-yard field goal (Drive: 10 plays, 42 yards, 5:17; North Dakota State 38–0)
- (0:12) NDSU – Bryce Lance 81-yard pass from Nathan Hayes, Eli Ozick kick (Drive: 7 plays, 67 yards, 1:02; North Dakota State 45–0)

Third Quarter

- (11:42) NDSU – Mikhale Ford 64-yard punt return, Drew Klein kick (North Dakota State 52–0)
- (2:34) NDSU – Cade Osterman 24-yard pass from Nathan Hayes, Drew Klein kick (Drive: 9 plays, 91 yards, 5:15; North Dakota State 59–0)

Fourth Quarter

- (13:33) NDSU – Drew Klein 46-yard field goal (Drive: 4 plays, 3 yards, 1:55; North Dakota State 62–0)
- (8:11) STMN – Amari Powell 7-yard run, Ben Hoiland kick (Drive: 2 plays, 8 yards, 0:49; North Dakota State 62–7)

Statistics	STMN	NDSU
First downs	12	23
Total yards	229	665
Rushing yards	77	268
Passing yards	152	397
Passing: Comp–Att–Int	17–33–2	17–23–0
Time of possession	31:06	28:54

Team	Category	Player	Statistics
St. Thomas (MN)	Passing	Amari Powell	14/26, 110 yards, 2 INT
St. Thomas (MN)	Rushing	Amari Powell	9 carries, 66 yards, TD
St. Thomas (MN)	Receiving	JaShawn Todd	8 receptions, 70 yards
North Dakota State	Passing	Cole Payton	9/12, 279 yards, 3 TD
North Dakota State	Rushing	Barika Kpeenu	10 carries, 107 yards, 2 TD
North Dakota State	Receiving	Bryce Lance	3 receptions, 106 yards, 2 TD
