= 2025 Rhode Island Rams football team =

American college football season

2025 Rhode Island Rams football

CAA champion

NCAA Division I Second Round, L 26–47 at UC Davis
- Conference: CAA Football

Ranking
- STATS: No. 11
- FCS Coaches: No. 10
- Record: 11–3 (8–0 CAA)
- Head coach: Jim Fleming (12th season)
- Offensive coordinator: Mike Flanagan (1st season)
- Defensive coordinator: Chris Lorenti (3rd season)
- Home stadium: Meade Stadium

2025 Coastal Athletic Association Football Conference standings
	Conf.			Overall
Team	W		L	W		L
No. 11 Rhode Island $^	8	–	0	11	–	3
No. 4т Villanova ^	7	–	1	12	–	3
No. 23 New Hampshire ^	6	–	2	8	–	5
No. 22 Monmouth	6	–	2	9	–	3
William & Mary	6	–	2	7	–	5
Maine	5	–	3	6	–	6
Elon	4	–	4	6	–	6
Stony Brook	4	–	4	6	–	6
Towson	4	–	4	6	–	6
North Carolina A&T	2	–	6	2	–	10
Campbell	2	–	6	2	–	10
Bryant	1	–	7	3	–	9
Albany	1	–	7	2	–	10
Hampton	0	–	8	2	–	10
$ – Conference champion; ^ – FCS playoff participant; Rankings from STATS Poll

The 2025 Rhode Island Rams football team represented the University of Rhode Island as a member of the Coastal Athletic Association Football Conference (CAA Football) during the 2025 NCAA Division I FCS football season. The Rams were led by 12th-year head coach Jim Fleming and played their home games at Meade Stadium.

On July 28, it was announced that the 2025 Governor's Cup game against Brown would be played at the new Centreville Bank Stadium in Pawtucket on Friday, October 3, at 7:00 p.m. This will be the first football game held there.

== Schedule ==
Date	Time	Opponent	Rank	Site	TV	Result	Attendance
August 29	6:00 p.m.	Campbell	No. 9	Meade Stadium; Kingston, RI	FloSports	W 31–20	5,267
September 6	6:00 p.m.	at Stony Brook	No. 9	Kenneth P. LaValle Stadium; Stony Brook, NY	FloSports	W 31–17	5,539
September 13	2:00 p.m.	at Holy Cross*	No. 6	Fitton Field; Worcester, MA	ESPN+	W 9–7	14,127
September 20	6:00 p.m.	LIU*^{†}	No. 7	Meade Stadium; Kingston, RI	FloSports	W 28–7	5,520
September 27	6:30 p.m.	at Western Michigan*	No. 6	Waldo Stadium; Kalamazoo, MI	ESPN+	L 14–47	20,191
October 3	7:00 p.m.	at Brown*	No. 8	Centreville Bank Stadium; Pawtucket, RI (rivalry)	ESPN+	L 21–28	5,047
October 11	1:00 p.m.	New Hampshire	No. 17	Meade Stadium; Kingston, RI	FloSports	W 38–27	5,192
October 18	3:30 p.m.	at Albany	No. 16	Bob Ford Field; Albany, NY	FloSports	W 58–17	6,158
October 25	1:00 p.m.	Bryant	No. 13	Meade Stadium; Kingston, RI	FloSports	W 38–17	5,771
November 8	2:00 p.m.	at Elon	No. 14	Rhodes Stadium; Elon, NC	FloSports	W 34–20	4,153
November 15	1:00 p.m.	at Maine	No. 11	Alfond Stadium; Orono, ME	FloSports	W 45–13	4,012
November 22	1:00 p.m.	Hampton	No. 10	Meade Stadium; Kingston, RI	FloSports	W 38–10	4,461
November 29	12:00 p.m.	Central Connecticut*	No. 8	Meade Stadium; Kingston, RI (NCAA Division I First Round)	ESPN+	W 27–19	2,680
December 6	10:00 p.m.	at No. 11 UC Davis*	No. 8	UC Davis Health Stadium; Davis, CA (NCAA Division I Second Round)	ESPN+	L 26–47	8,525
*Non-conference game; ^{†}Homecoming; Rankings from STATS Poll released prior to the game; All times are in Eastern time

== Game summaries ==
=== Campbell ===
Campbell Fighting Camels (0–0) at No. 9 Rhode Island Rams (0–0) – Game summary

Quarter	1	2	3	4	Total
Fighting Camels	7	10	3	0	20
No. 9 Rams	7	7	3	14	31

at Meade Stadium • Kingston, RI

- Date: August 29
- Game time: 6:00 PM EDT
- Game weather: Sunny
- Game attendance: 5,267
- Referee: Tom Zetts
- TV: FloSports

Game information

First quarter

- URI – Kevin Schaeffer 31-yard pass from Devin Farrell (Garth White kick), 13:07. Rams 7–0. Drive: 4 plays, 75 yards, 1:53.
- CAMP – JJ Cowan 1-yard pass from Kamden Sixkiller (Alex Crabb kick), 4:35. Tied 7–7. Drive: 2 plays, 3 yards, 0:47.

Second quarter

- CAMP – Mike Chandler II 6-yard run (Alex Crabb kick), 6:44. Fighting Camels 14–7. Drive: 16 plays, 90 yards, 8:39.
- CAMP – Alex Crabb 29-yard field goal, 5:51. Fighting Camels 17–7. Drive: 4 plays, 7 yards, 0:41.
- URI – Antwain Littleton Jr. 2-yard run (Garth White kick), 1:57. Fighting Camels 17–14. Drive: 8 plays, 75 yards, 3:54.

Third quarter

- CAMP – Alex Crabb 40-yard field goal, 8:45. Fighting Camels 20–14. Drive: 6 plays, 19 yards, 2:41.
- URI – Garth White 36-yard field goal, 3:58. Fighting Camels 20–17. Drive: 7 plays, 35 yards, 2:23.

Fourth quarter

- URI – Antwain Littleon Jr. 1-yard run (Garth White kick), 12:02. Rams 24–20. Drive: 13 plays, 66 yards, 5:59.
- URI – Marquis Buchanan 46-yard pass from Devin Farrell (Garth White kick), 9:27. Rams 31–20. Drive: 1 play, 46 yards, 0:10.

Statistics	CAM	URI
First downs	13	21
Plays–yards	68–268	62–384
Rushes–yards	32–120	34–109
Passing yards	148	275
Passing: Comp–Att–Int	18–36–0	15–28–0
Turnovers	1	3
Time of possession	31:05	28:55

Team	Category	Player	Statistics
Campbell	Passing	Kamden Sixkiller	17/33, 144 yards, TD
Campbell	Rushing	JJ Cowan	7 carries, 43 yards
Campbell	Receiving	Spencer Jones	4 receptions, 55 yards
Rhode Island	Passing	Devin Farrell	15/28, 275 yards, 2 TD
Rhode Island	Rushing	Antwain Littleton Jr.	25 carries, 85 yards, 2 TD
Rhode Island	Receiving	Marquis Buchanan	6 receptions, 167 yards, TD

=== at Stony Brook ===
No. 9 Rhode Island Rams (1–0) at Stony Brook Seawolves (0–1) – Game summary

Quarter	1	2	3	4	Total
No. 9 Rams	0	24	0	7	31
Seawolves	10	0	0	7	17

at Kenneth P. LaValle Stadium • Stony Brook, NY

- Date: September 6
- Game time: 6:00 PM EDT
- Game attendance: 5,539
- Referee: Jeff Pumphrey
- TV: FloSports

Game information

First quarter

- STBK – Enda Kirby 22-yard field goal, 6:02. Seawolves 3–0. Drive: 8 plays, 78 yards, 3:44.
- STBK – Roland Dempster 1-yard run (Enda Kirby kick), 2:58. Seawolves 10–0. Drive: 7 plays, 29 yards, 2:56.

Second quarter

- URI – Marquis Bunchanan 12-yard pass from Devin Farrell (Garth White kick), 9:14. Seawolves 10–7. Drive: 6 plays, 78 yards, 3:01.
- URI – Leisaan Hibbert 30-yard interception return (Garth White kick), 8:28. Rams 14–10.
- URI – Garth White 35-yard field goal, 3:32. Rams 17–10. Drive: 8 plays, 55 yards, 3:47.
- URI – Antwain Littleton Jr. 1-yard pass from Devin Farrell (Garth White kick), 0:07. Rams 24–10. Drive: 8 plays, 84 yards, 0:52.

Third quarter

- No scoring plays.

Fourth quarter

- STBK – Chris Zellous 3-yard run (Michael Mannino kick), 11:28. Rams 24–17. Drive: 12 plays, 82 yards, 4:54.
- URI – Antwain Littleton Jr. 15-yard run (Garth White kick), 2:09. Rams 31–17. Drive: 4 plays, 70 yards, 1:01.

Statistics	URI	STBK
First downs	22	18
Plays–yards	64–457	78–403
Rushes–yards	30–141	58–266
Passing yards	316	137
Passing: Comp–Att–Int	20–34–0	12–20–1
Turnovers	1	2
Time of possession	27:33	32:27

Team	Category	Player	Statistics
Rhode Island	Passing	Devin Farrell	20/34, 316 yards, 2 TD
Rhode Island	Rushing	Antwain Littleton Jr.	21 carries, 122 yards, TD
Rhode Island	Receiving	Aboraa Kwarteng	4 receptions, 114 yards
Stony Brook	Passing	Chris Zellous	12/20, 137 yards, INT
Stony Brook	Rushing	Roland Dempster	28 carries, 167 yards, TD
Stony Brook	Receiving	Cole Bunicci	2 receptions, 55 yards

=== at Holy Cross ===
No. 6 Rhode Island Rams (2–0) at Holy Cross Crusaders (0–2) – Game summary

Quarter	1	2	3	4	Total
No. 6 Rams	3	3	0	3	9
Crusaders	0	7	0	0	7

at Fitton Field • Worcester, MA

- Date: September 13
- Game time: 2:00 PM EDT
- Game attendance: 14,127
- Referee: Justin Ackley
- TV announcers (ESPN+): Jorge Bannister (play-by-play), Kevin Shea (analyst) and Alexandra DeCapua (sideline)

Game information

First quarter

- URI – Garth White 24-yard field goal, 6:26. Rams 3–0. Drive: 14 plays, 78 yards, 6:02.

Second quarter

- HC – Jayden Clerveaux 1-yard run (Owen Saraceno kick), 5:30. Crusaders 7–3. Drive: 9 plays, 54 yards, 4:32.
- URI – Garth White 29-yard field goal, 1:24. Crusaders 7–6. Drive: 13 plays, 69 yards, 4:06.

Third quarter

- No scoring plays.

Fourth quarter

- URI – Garth White 41-yard field goal, 2:23. Rams 9–7. Drive: 8 plays, 60 yards, 3:34.

Statistics	URI	HC
First downs	19	15
Plays–yards	64–402	60–229
Rushes–yards	27–131	31–72
Passing yards	271	157
Passing: Comp–Att–Int	22–37–1	14–29–0
Turnovers	1	0
Time of possession	31:03	28:51

Team	Category	Player	Statistics
Rhode Island	Passing	Devin Farrell	22/37, 271 yards, INT
Rhode Island	Rushing	Antwain Littleton Jr.	18 carries, 94 yards
Rhode Island	Receiving	Marquis Buchanan	5 receptions, 84 yards
Holy Cross	Passing	Cal Swanson	14/29, 157 yards
Holy Cross	Rushing	Jayden Clerveaux	8 carries, 29 yards, TD
Holy Cross	Receiving	Max Mosey	4 receptions, 40 yards

=== LIU ===
LIU Sharks (1–2) at No. 7 Rhode Island Rams (3–0) – Game summary

Quarter	1	2	3	4	Total
Sharks	0	7	0	0	7
No. 7 Rams	7	7	7	7	28

at Meade Stadium • Kingston, RI

- Date: September 20
- Game time: 6:00 PM EDT
- Game weather: Sunny
- Game attendance: 5,520
- Referee: Todd Boyd
- TV: FloFootball

Game information

First quarter

- URI – Aboraa Kwarteng 5-yard pass from Devin Farrell (Garth White kick), 1:09. Rams 7–0. Drive: 8 plays, 55 yards, 4:04.

Second quarter

- URI – Marquis Buchanan 35-yard pass from Devin Farrell (Garth White kick), 11:03. Rams 14–0. Drive: 9 plays, 79 yards, 3:46.
- LIU – Chris Howell 6-yard run (Lance Maiberg kick), 0:36. Rams 14–7. Drive: 11 plays, 67 yards, 3:30.

Third quarter

- URI – Devin Farrell 2-yard run (Garth White kick), 10:43. Rams 21–7. Drive: 2 plays, 4 yards, 0:29.

Fourth quarter

- URI – Antwain Littleton Jr. 1-yard run (Garth White kick), 9:11. Rams 28–7. Drive: 14 plays, 86 yards, 7:48.

Statistics	LIU	URI
First downs	16	17
Plays–yards	63–304	69–351
Rushes–yards	35–203	37–158
Passing yards	101	193
Passing: Comp–Att–Int	10–28–2	19–32–1
Turnovers	2	1
Time of possession	28:58	31:02

Team	Category	Player	Statistics
LIU	Passing	Chris Howell	10/28, 101 yards, 2 INT
LIU	Rushing	OJ Ross	11 carries, 130 yards
LIU	Receiving	Deion Richardson	3 receptions, 41 yards
Rhode Island	Passing	Devin Farrell	19/32, 193 yards, 2 TD, INT
Rhode Island	Rushing	Antwain Littleton Jr.	29 carries, 119 yards, TD
Rhode Island	Receiving	Marquis Buchanan	7 receptions, 103 yards, TD

=== at Western Michigan (FBS) ===
No. 6 Rhode Island Rams (4–0) at Western Michigan Broncos (FBS) (1–3) – Game summary

Quarter	1	2	3	4	Total
No. 6 Rams	7	0	0	7	14
Broncos (FBS)	3	28	13	3	47

at Waldo Stadium • Kalamazoo, MI

- Date: September 27
- Game time: 6:30 PM EDT
- Game weather: • Temperature: 78 °F (26 °C) • Wind: W at 8 miles per hour (13 km/h)
- Game attendance: 20,191
- Referee: Andrew Speciale
- TV announcers (ESPN+): Jack Kizer (play-by-play) and Forrest Conoly (analyst)

Game information

First quarter

- (13:49) URI – Antwain Littleton Jr. 2-yard run, Garth White kick (Drive: 3 plays, 75 yards, 1:11; Rhode Island 7-0)
- (6:48) WMU – Palmer Domschke 29-yard field goal (Drive: 15 plays, 68 yards, 6:58; Rhode Island 7-3)

Second quarter

- (13:35) WMU – Broc Lowry 4-yard run, Palmer Domschke kick (Drive: 13 plays, 72 yards, 7:15; Western Michigan 10-7)
- (7:59) WMU – Aveion Chenault 10-yard pass from Broc Lowry, Palmer Domschke kick (Drive: 7 plays, 55 yards, 4:02; Western Michigan 17-7)
- (4:54) WMU – Ofa Mataele 22-yard run, Palmer Domschke kick (Drive: 3 plays, 29 yards, 1:21; Western Michigan 24-7)
- (0:20) WMU – Devin Miles 1-yard run, Palmer Domschke kick (Drive: 8 plays, 55 yards, 2:21; Western Michigan 31-7)

Third quarter

- (13:35) WMU – Ofa Mataele 3-yard run, Palmer Domschke kick (Drive: 1 play, 3 yards, 0:00; Western Michigan 38-7)
- (6:12) WMU – Palmer Domschke 41-yard field goal (Drive: 9 plays, 47 yards, 5:11; Western Michigan 41-7)
- (2:54) WMU – Palmer Domschke 49-yard field goal (Drive: 4 plays, 7 yards, 2:03; Western Michigan 44-7)

Fourth quarter

- (14:54) URI – Antwain Littleton Jr. 5-yard pass from Devin Farrell, Garth White kick (Drive: 7 plays, 75 yards, 3:00; Western Michigan 44-14)
- (2:36) WMU – Hunter Smith 21-yard field goal (Drive: 5 plays, 14 yards, 1:47; Western Michigan 47-14)

Statistics	URI	WMU
First downs	16	25
Plays–yards	51–251	77–372
Rushes–yards	23–(-5)	53–216
Passing yards	256	156
Passing: Comp–Att–Int	19–28–1	17–24–1
Turnovers	4	2
Time of possession	20:35	39:25

Team	Category	Player	Statistics
Rhode Island	Passing	Devin Farrell	16/24, 229 yards, TD, INT
Rhode Island	Rushing	Antwain Littleton Jr.	12 carries, 35 yards, TD
Rhode Island	Receiving	Marquis Buchanan	7 receptions, 141 yards
Western Michigan	Passing	Broc Lowry	15/20, 143 yards, TD
Western Michigan	Rushing	Ofa Mataele	10 carries, 60 yards, 2 TD
Western Michigan	Receiving	Baylin Brooks	2 receptions, 32 yards

=== at Brown (rivalry) ===
No. 8 Rhode Island Rams (4–1) at Brown Bears (1–1) – Game summary

Quarter	1	2	3	4	Total
No. 8 Rams	7	7	0	7	21
Bears	14	7	7	0	28

at Brown Stadium • Providence, RI

- Date: October 3
- Game time: 7:00 PM EDT
- Game weather: Sunny • Temperature: 70 °F (21 °C)
- Game attendance: 5,047
- Referee: Justin Ackley
- TV announcers (ESPN+): Scott Cordischi (play-by-play), John Anderson (analyst) and Nick Coit (sideline)

Game information

First quarter

- (13:11) BRWN – Matt Childs 6-yard run, Drew Crabtree kick (Drive: 2 plays, 10 yards, 0:30; Brown 7–0)
- (9:26) URI – Marquis Buchanan 6-yard pass from Devin Farrell, Garth White kick (Drive: 8 plays, 59 yards, 3:37; Tied 7–7)
- (2:15) BRWN – Ty Pezza 18-yard pass from James Murphy, Drew Crabtree kick (Drive: 15 plays, 75 yards, 7:11; Brown 14–7)

Second quarter

- (9:25) URI – Omari Walker 30-yard pass from Devin Farrell, Garth White kick (Drive: 7 plays, 74 yards, 3:45; Tied 14–14)
- (5:41) BRWN – Matt Childs 3-yard run, Drew Crabtree kick (Drive: 9 plays, 75 yards, 3:44; Brown 21–14)

Third quarter

- (4:36) BRWN – Solomon Miller 8-yard pass from James Murphy, Drew Crabtree kick (Drive: 16 plays, 80 yards, 7:11; Brown 28–14)

Fourth quarter

- (4:11) URI – Matt Smith 2-yard pass from Devin Farrell, Garth White kick (Drive: 10 plays, 80 yards, 3:57; Brown 28–21)

Statistics	URI	BRWN
First downs	23	22
Plays–yards	67–452	72–341
Rushes–yards	23–99	45–140
Passing yards	353	201
Passing: Comp–Att–Int	30–44–2	20–27–0
Turnovers	4	0
Time of possession	27:11	32:49

Team	Category	Player	Statistics
Rhode Island	Passing	Devin Farrell	30/44, 353 yards, 3 TD, 2 INT
Rhode Island	Rushing	Antwain Littleton Jr.	15 carries, 60 yards
Rhode Island	Receiving	Greg Gaines	5 receptions, 87 yards
Brown	Passing	James Murphy	20/27, 201 yards, 2 TD
Brown	Rushing	Matt Childs	22 carries, 64 yards, 2 TD
Brown	Receiving	Ty Pezza	6 receptions, 93 yards, TD

=== New Hampshire ===
New Hampshire Wildcats (3–3) at No. 17 Rhode Island Rams (4–2) – Game summary

Quarter	1	2	3	4	Total
Wildcats	7	7	13	0	27
No. 17 Rams	0	17	0	21	38

at Meade Stadium • Kingston, RI

- Date: October 11
- Game time: 1:00 PM EDT
- Game weather: Sunny
- Game attendance: 5,192
- Referee: Jeff Pumphrey
- TV: FloSports

Game information

First quarter

- UNH – Myles Thomason 5-yard run (Nick Reed kick), 9:55. Wildcats 7–0. Drive: 8 plays, 47 yards, 3:06.

Second quarter

- URI – Antwain Littleton Jr. 3-yard run (Garth White kick), 13:19. Tied 7–7. Drive: 14 plays, 80 yards, 7:14.
- URI – Garth White 45-yard field goal, 3:58. Rams 10–7. Drive: 14 plays, 66 yards, 6:08.
- UNH – Chase Wilson 20-yard pass from Matt Vezza (Nick Reed kick), 1:55. Wildcats 14–10. Drive: 5 plays, 75 yards, 2:03.
- URI – Brendon Barrow 28-yard run (Garth White kick), 0:25. Rams 17–14. Drive: 8 plays, 75 yards, 1:30.

Third quarter

- UNH – Peyton Strickland 2-yard pass from Matt Vezza (Nick Reed kick), 9:12. Wildcats 21–17. Drive: 10 plays, 63 yards, 5:41.
- UNH – Nick Reed 46-yard field goal, 6:50. Wildcats 24–17. Drive: 4 plays, 5 yards, 2:16.
- UNH – Nick Reed 31-yard field goal, 1:46. Wildcats 27–17. Drive: 9 plays, 42 yards, 4:10.

Fourth quarter

- URI – Brendon Barrow 19-yard run (Garth White kick), 13:05. Wildcats 27–24. Drive: 9 plays, 75 yards, 3:41.
- URI – Devin Farrell 16-yard run (Garth White kick), 2:12. Rams 31–27. Drive: 7 plays, 49 yards, 4:08.
- URI – Rohan Davy 0-yard fumble recovery (Garth White kick), 1:05. Rams 38–27.

Statistics	UNH	URI
First downs	20	20
Plays–yards	68–320	64–384
Rushes–yards	36–127	41–220
Passing yards	193	164
Passing: Comp–Att–Int	16–32–0	15–23–1
Turnovers	1	1
Time of possession	31:08	28:52

Team	Category	Player	Statistics
New Hampshire	Passing	Matt Vezza	16/32, 193 yards, 2 TD
New Hampshire	Rushing	Matt Vezza	16 carries, 54 yards
New Hampshire	Receiving	Chase Wilson	5 receptions, 69 yards, TD
Rhode Island	Passing	Devin Farrell	15/23, 164 yards, INT
Rhode Island	Rushing	Brendon Barrow	14 carries, 111 yards, 2 TD
Rhode Island	Receiving	Aboraa Kwarteng	3 receptions, 47 yards

=== at Albany ===
No. 16 Rhode Island Rams (5–2) at Albany Great Danes (1–5) – Game summary

Quarter	1	2	3	4	Total
No. 16 Rams	10	21	7	20	58
Great Danes	0	3	14	0	17

at Tom & Mary Casey Stadium • Albany, NY

- Date: October 18
- Game time: 3:30 PM EDT
- Game weather: Cloudy • Temperature: 60 °F (16 °C) • Wind: N at 2 miles per hour (3.2 km/h)
- Game attendance: 6,158
- Referee: Anthony Florio
- TV announcers (FloFootball): Rodger Wyland (play-by-play) and Michael Johnson Jr. (analyst)

Game information

First quarter

- (10:21) URI – Garth White 48-yard field goal (Drive: 7 plays, -7 yards, 3:09; Rhode Island 3-0)
- (3:15) URI – Antwain Littleton Jr. 1-yard run, Garth White kick (Drive: 11 plays, 50 yards, 4:34; Rhode Island 10-0)

Second quarter

- (12:54) ALB – James Bozek 33-yard field goal (Drive: 13 plays, 59 yards, 5:21; Rhode Island 10-3)
- (10:37) URI – Greg Gaines III 32-yard pass from Devin Farrell, Garth White kick (Drive: 5 plays, 75 yards, 2:17; Rhode Island 17-3)
- (6:38) URI – Greg Gaines III 42-yard pass from Devin Farrell, Garth White kick (Drive: 4 plays, 82 yards, 1:32; Rhode Island 24-3)
- (0:49) URI – Connor Finer 4-yard pass from Devin Farrell, Garth White kick (Drive: 6 plays, 69 yards, 2:00; Rhode Island 31-3)

Third quarter

- (9:04) URI – Connor Finer 5-yard pass from Devin Farrell, Garth White kick (Drive: 11 plays, 75 yards, 5:56; Rhode Island 38-3)
- (6:05) ALB – Griffin Woodell 46-yard pass from Jack Shields, James Bozek kick (Drive: 5 plays, 74 yards, 2:55; Rhode Island 38-10)
- (2:42) ALB – Aidan Semo 2-yard run, James Bozek kick (Drive: 1 play, 2 yards, 0:00; Rhode Island 38-17)

Fourth quarter

- (13:12) URI – Terrence Campbell 2-yard run, Garth White kick (Drive: 4 plays, 39 yards, 1:38; Rhode Island 45-17)
- (3:26) URI – Will Dixon 2-yard pass from Conner Kenyon, Garth White PAT failed (Drive: 13 plays, 65 yards, 7:29; Rhode Island 51-17)
- (0:51) URI – Leisaan Hibbert 47-yard fumble return, Garth White kick (Drive: 5 plays, 22 yards, 2:35; Rhode Island 58-17)

Statistics	URI	ALB
First downs	23	19
Plays–yards	67–477	61–325
Rushes–yards	46–142	35–133
Passing yards	335	192
Passing: Comp–Att–Int	20-21-0	12-26-2
Turnovers	0	4
Time of possession	32:57	26:59

Team	Category	Player	Statistics
Rhode Island	Passing	Devin Farrell	19/20, 333 yards, 4 TD
Rhode Island	Rushing	Antwain Littleton Jr.	16 carries, 72 yards, TD
Rhode Island	Receiving	Greg Gaines III	6 receptions, 153 yards, 2 TD
Albany	Passing	Jack Shields	12/26, 192 yards, TD, 2 INT
Albany	Rushing	Griffin Woodell	5 carries, 62 yards
Albany	Receiving	Griffin Woodell	2 receptions, 50 yards, TD

=== Bryant ===
Bryant Bulldogs (2–5) at No. 13 Rhode Island Rams (6–2) – Game summary

Quarter	1	2	3	4	Total
Bulldogs	7	10	0	0	17
No. 13 Rams	14	10	7	7	38

at Meade Stadium • Kingston, RI

- Date: October 25
- Game time: 1:00 PM EDT
- Game weather: Sunny
- Game attendance: 5,771
- Referee: Marc Queen
- TV announcers (FloSports): Jonathan Blair (play-by-play) and Ryan Pelillo (analyst)

Game information

First quarter

- (8:00) BRY – Koby Keenan 11-yard pass from Jaden Keefner, Nicholas Stoyanovich kick (Drive: 12 plays, 79 yards, 6:47; Bryant 7–0)
- (3:02) URI – Gabe Winowich 51-yard run, Garth White kick (Drive: 5 plays, 82 yards, 2:15; Tied 7–7)
- (2:18) URI – Gabe Winowich 6-yard run, Garth White kick (Drive: 2 plays, 21 yards, 0:41; Rhode Island 14–7)

Second quarter

- (13:24) BRY – Nicholas Stoyanovich 24-yard field goal (Drive: 7 plays, 68 yards, 3:49; Rhode Island 14–10)
- (5:08) BRY – Elijah Elliott 1-yard run, Nicholas Stoyanovich kick (Drive: 11 plays, 80 yards, 6:02; Bryant 17–14)
- (1:55) URI – Kevin Schaeffer 27-yard pass from Devin Farrell, Garth White kick (Drive: 7 plays, 75 yards, 3:13; Rhode Island 21–17)
- (0:19) URI – Garth White 54-yard field goal (Drive: 7 plays, 23 yards, 0:37; Rhode Island 24–17)

Third quarter

- (6:13) URI – Greg Gaines 38-yard pass from Devin Farrell, Garth White kick (Drive: 2 plays, 44 yards, 1:08; Rhode Island 31–17)

Fourth quarter

- (2:12) URI – Ayinde Johnson 24-yard interception return, Garth White kick (Rhode Island 38–17)

Statistics	BRY	URI
First downs	26	14
Plays–yards	82–363	48–402
Rushes–yards	46–167	26–130
Passing yards	196	272
Passing: Comp–Att–Int	17–36–2	14–22–1
Turnovers	2	2
Time of possession	39:02	20:58

Team	Category	Player	Statistics
Bryant	Passing	Jaden Keefner	17/36, 196 yards, TD, 2 INT
Bryant	Rushing	Elijah Elliott	22 carries, 83 yards, TD
Bryant	Receiving	Elijah Elliott	5 receptions, 84 yards
Rhode Island	Passing	Devin Farrell	14/22, 272 yards, 2 TD, INT
Rhode Island	Rushing	Gabe Winowich	13 carries, 90 yards, 2 TD
Rhode Island	Receiving	Marquis Buchanan	3 receptions, 124 yards

=== at Elon ===
No. 14 Rhode Island Rams (7–2) at Elon Phoenix (4–5) – Game summary

Quarter	1	2	3	4	Total
No. 14 Rams	7	17	3	7	34
Phoenix	3	7	7	3	20

at Rhodes Stadium • Elon, NC

- Date: November 8
- Game time: 2:00 PM EST
- Game weather: Sunny
- Game attendance: 4,153
- Referee: Justin Ackley
- TV announcers (FloSports): Taylor Durham (play-by-play), Dr. Khirey Walker (analyst) and Hannah Bradley (sideline)

Game information

First quarter

- ELON – Luke Barnes 50-yard field goal, 11:30. Phoenix 3–0. Drive: 9 plays, 53 yards, 3:25.
- URI – Devin Farrell 10-yard run (Garth White kick), 3:49. Rams 7–3. Drive: 15 plays, 96 yards, 7:41.

Second quarter

- URI – Garth White 52-yard field goal, 11:06. Rams 10–3. Drive: 10 plays, 46 yards, 4:23.
- URI – Greg Gaines III 19-yard pass from Devin Farrell (Garth White kick), 7:23. Rams 17–3. Drive: 5 plays, 70 yards, 1:42.
- URI – Aboraa Kwarteng 70-yard pass from Devin Farrell (Garth White kick), 4:57. Rams 24–3. Drive: 1 play, 70 yards, 0:12.
- ELON – Isaiah Fuhrmann 9-yard pass from Landen Clark (Luke Barnes kick), 0:02. Rams 24–10. Drive: 8 plays, 35 yards, 1:32.

Third quarter

- URI – Garth White 43-yard field goal, 10:35. Rams 27–10. Drive: 9 plays, 49 yards, 4:25.
- ELON – Darren James-Hamilton 70-yard punt return (Luke Barnes kick), 5:08. Rams 27–17.

Fourth quarter

- URI – Alex McClelland 6-yard run (Garth White kick), 14:54. Rams 34–17. Drive: 10 plays, 65 yards, 5:14.
- ELON – Luke Barnes 41-yard field goal, 3:15. Rams 34–20. Drive: 5 plays, 55 yards, 1:26.

Statistics	URI	ELON
First downs	24	11
Plays–yards	71–442	54–225
Rushes–yards	41–133	22–30
Passing yards	309	195
Passing: Comp–Att–Int	24–30–0	18–32–0
Turnovers	0	0
Time of possession	37:17	22:43

Team	Category	Player	Statistics
Rhode Island	Passing	Devin Farrell	24/30, 309 yards, 2 TD
Rhode Island	Rushing	Antwain Littleton Jr.	20 carries, 101 yards
Rhode Island	Receiving	Aboraa Kwarteng	4 receptions, 124 yards, TD
Elon	Passing	Landen Clark	12/18, 104 yards, TD
Elon	Rushing	Jimmyll Williams	8 carries, 38 yards
Elon	Receiving	Isaiah Fuhrmann	4 receptions, 79 yards, TD

=== at Maine ===
No. 11 Rhode Island Rams (8–2) at Maine Black Bears (6–4) – Game summary

Quarter	1	2	3	4	Total
No. 11 Rams	14	14	14	3	45
Black Bears	0	7	6	0	13

at Alfond Sports Stadium • Orono, ME

- Date: November 15
- Game time: 1:00 PM EST
- Game attendance: 4,012
- Referee: Alex Parrella
- TV announcers (FloSports): Jim Churchill (play-by-play), Jack Webb (analyst) and Allison Ouellette (sideline)

Game information

First quarter

- URI – Antwain Littleton Jr. 2-yard run (Garth White kick), 3:29. Rams 7–0. Drive: 13 plays, 74 yards, 6:33.
- URI – Dontay Bishop 2-yard pass from Devin Farrell (Garth White kick), 0:41. Rams 14–0. Drive: 3 plays, 5 yards, 1:21.

Second quarter

- ME – Scott Woods 40-yard pass from Carter Peevy (Samuel Tremblay kick), 12:50. Rams 14–7. Drive: 6 plays, 88 yards, 2:43.
- URI – Brendon Barrow 12-yard run (Garth White kick), 11:54. Rams 21–7. Drive: 2 plays, 77 yards, 0:50.
- URI – Marquis Buchanan 63-yard pass from Devin Farrell (Garth White kick), 7:34. Rams 28–7. Drive: 6 plays, 87 yards, 3:17.

Third quarter

- URI – Brendon Barrow 3-yard run (Garth White kick), 7:40. Rams 35–7. Drive: 5 plays, 59 yards, 2:16.
- ME – Carter Peevy 4-yard run (pass failed), 2:10. Rams 35–13. Drive: 7 plays, 51 yards, 3:45.
- URI – Antwain Littleton Jr. 52-yard run (Garth White kick), 1:50. Rams 42–13. Drive: 1 play, 52 yards, 0:10.

Fourth quarter

- URI – Garth White 27-yard field goal, 11:17. Rams 45–13. Drive: 10 plays, 61 yards, 3:53.

Statistics	URI	ME
First downs	21	15
Plays–yards	62–497	62–323
Rushes–yards	39–264	28–45
Passing yards	233	278
Passing: Comp–Att–Int	17-23-0	21-34-0
Turnovers	1	0
Time of possession	29:27	30:33

Team	Category	Player	Statistics
Rhode Island	Passing	Devin Farrell	16/22, 221 yards, 2 TD
Rhode Island	Rushing	Antwain Littleton, Jr.	21 carries, 202 yards, 2 TD
Rhode Island	Receiving	Marquis Buchanan	6 receptions, 138 yards, TD
Maine	Passing	Carter Peevy	21/34, 278 yards, TD
Maine	Rushing	Sincere Baines	11 carries, 36 yards
Maine	Receiving	Scott Woods II	5 receptions, 114 yards, TD

=== Hampton ===
Hampton Pirates (2–9) at No. 10 Rhode Island Rams (9–2) – Game summary

Quarter	1	2	3	4	Total
Pirates	0	7	3	0	10
No. 10 Rams	21	3	7	7	38

at Meade Stadium • Kingston, RI

- Date: November 22
- Game time: 1:00 PM EST
- Game weather: Rain • Temperature: 46 °F (8 °C)
- Game attendance: 4,461
- Referee: Henry Wimberg
- TV: FloSports

Game information

First quarter

- URI – Antwain Littleton Jr. 65-yard run (Garth White kick), 12:24. Rams 7–0. Drive: 2 plays, 65 yards, 0:13.
- URI – Brendon Barrow 28-yard run (Garth White kick), 8:05. Rams 14–0. Drive: 5 plays, 70 yards, 2:15.
- URI – Antwain Littleton Jr. 6-yard run (Garth White kick), 1:13. Rams 21–0. Drive: 8 plays, 72 yards, 4:53.

Second quarter

- HAMP – Earl Woods III 44-yard run (Brett Starling kick), 6:12. Rams 21–7. Drive: 6 plays, 87 yards, 2:12.
- URI – Garth White 39-yard field goal, 0:07. Rams 24–7. Drive: 11 plays, 70 yards, 1:03.

Third quarter

- HAMP – Brett Starling 30-yard field goal, 9:14. Rams 24–10. Drive: 8 plays, 65 yards, 4:23.
- URI – Connor Finer 4-yard pass from Conner Kenyon (Garth White kick), 1:24. Rams 31–10. Drive: 10 plays, 56 yards, 4:23.

Fourth quarter

- URI – Omari Walker 61-yard pass from Conner Kenyon (Garth White kick), 9:17. Rams 38–10. Drive: 8 plays, 96 yards, 3:01.

Statistics	HAMP	URI
First downs	11	27
Plays–yards	56–276	79–610
Rushes–yards	29–140	31–201
Passing yards	136	409
Passing: Comp–Att–Int	19–27–1	32–48–0
Turnovers	1	1
Time of possession	28:10	31:50

Team	Category	Player	Statistics
Hampton	Passing	Earl Woods III	19/27, 136 yards, INT
Hampton	Rushing	Earl Woods III	11 carries, 87 yards, TD
Hampton	Receiving	Maxwell Moss	6 receptions, 58 yards
Rhode Island	Passing	Conner Kenyon	21/32, 258 yards, 2 TD
Rhode Island	Rushing	Antwain Littleton Jr.	19 carries, 148 yards, 2 TD
Rhode Island	Receiving	Greg Gaines III	8 receptions, 139 yards

=== vs. Central Connecticut (Division I First Round) ===
2025 NCAA Division I FCS Playoffs First Round
Central Connecticut Blue Devils (8–4) at No. 8 (9) Rhode Island Rams (10–2) – Game summary

Quarter	1	2	3	4	Total
Blue Devils	7	0	0	12	19
No. 8 (9) Rams	14	10	0	3	27

at Meade Stadium • Kingston, RI

- Date: November 29
- Game time: 12:00 PM EST
- Game weather: Clear • Temperature: 40 °F (4 °C) • Wind: NW at 12 miles per hour (19 km/h)
- Game attendance: 2,680
- Referee: Jason Soistman
- TV: ESPN+

Game information

First quarter

- URI – Connor Finer 28-yard pass from Devin Farrell (Garth White kick), 8:48. Rams 7–0. Drive: 10 plays, 62 yards, 4:56.
- URI – Marquis Buchanan 25-yard pass from Devin Farrell (Garth White kick), 6:46. Rams 14–0. Drive: 3 plays, 58 yards, 1:17.
- CCSU – Elijah Howard 3-yard pass from Brady Olson (Jack Hennessey kick), 0:02. Rams 14–7. Drive: 16 plays, 75 yards, 6:44.

Second quarter

- URI – Antwain Littleton Jr. 1-yard run (Garth White kick), 7:49. Rams 21–7. Drive: 8 plays, 77 yards, 3:21.
- URI – Garth White 42-yard field goal, 0:00. Rams 24–7. Drive: 8 plays, 42 yards, 2:22.

Third quarter

- No scoring plays.

Fourth quarter

- CCSU – Damani Williams 25-yard pass from Brady Olson (Jack Hennessey kick BLOCKED), 12:44. Rams 24–13. Drive: 11 plays, 79 yards, 5:25.
- CCSU – Jack Hennessey 18-yard field goal, 9:57. Rams 24–16. Drive: 4 plays, 6 yards, 1:57.
- URI – Garth White 26-yard field goal, 5:03. Rams 27–16. Drive: 9 plays, 56 yards, 4:54.
- CCSU – Jack Hennessey 28-yard field goal, 2:03. Rams 27–19. Drive: 13 plays, 64 yards, 3:00.

Statistics	CCSU	URI
First downs	22	17
Plays–yards	82–382	64–447
Rushes–yards	20–71	26–82
Passing yards	311	365
Passing: Comp–Att–Int	35–62–0	24–38–1
Turnovers	0	1
Time of possession	30:37	29:23

Team	Category	Player	Statistics
Central Connecticut	Passing	Brady Olson	35/62, 311 yards, 2 TD
Central Connecticut	Rushing	Elijah Howard	13 carries, 35 yards
Central Connecticut	Receiving	Michael Trovarelli	11 receptions, 106 yards
Rhode Island	Passing	Devin Farrell	24/38, 365 yards, 2 TD, INT
Rhode Island	Rushing	Brendon Barrow	6 carries, 36 yards
Rhode Island	Receiving	Marquis Buchanan	7 receptions, 101 yards, TD

=== at No. 11 UC Davis (Division I Second Round) ===
2025 NCAA Division I FCS Playoffs Second Round
No. 8 (9) Rhode Island Rams (11–2) at No. 11 (8) UC Davis Aggies (8–3) – Game summary

Quarter	1	2	3	4	Total
No. 8 (9) Rams	0	20	0	6	26
No. 11 (8) Aggies	3	15	15	14	47

at UC Davis Health Stadium • Davis, CA

- Date: December 6
- Game time: 7:00 PM PST
- Game weather: Fog • Temperature: 48 °F (9 °C) • Wind: NW at 5 miles per hour (8.0 km/h)
- Game attendance: 8,525
- Referee: John Shay
- TV announcers (ESPN2): Chris Sylvester (play-by-play) and Craig Haubert (analyst)

Game information

First quarter

- UCD – Hunter Ridley 37-yard field goal, 11:27. Aggies 3–0. Drive: 12 plays, 50 yards, 3:33.

Second quarter

- URI – Antwain Littleton Jr. 2-yard run (Garth White kick), 9:55. Rams 7–3. Drive: 9 plays, 80 yards, 5:01.
- UCD – Scott Nixon 3-yard pass from Caden Pinnick (Ian Simpson run), 7:55. Aggies 11–7. Drive: 4 plays, 75 yards, 2:00.
- URI – Antwain Littleton Jr. 63-yard run (Garth White kick), 7:05. Rams 14–11. Drive: 2 plays, 68 yards, 0:41.
- URI – Marquis Buchanan 75-yard pass from Devin Farrell (Garth White kick BLOCKED), 2:20. Rams 20–11. Drive: 6 plays, 86 yards, 1:53.
- UCD – Zach Jones 15-yard pass from Caden Pinnick (Hunter Ridley kick), 0:18. Rams 20–18. Drive: 10 plays, 82 yards, 1:56.

Third quarter

- UCD – Jordan Fisher 50-yard run (Hunter Ridley kick), 12:34. Aggies 25–20. Drive: 2 plays, 56 yards, 0:41.
- UCD – Ian Simpson 9-yard pass from Caden Pinnick (Jordan Fisher run), 7:32. Aggies 33–20. Drive: 2 plays, 17 yards, 0:30.

Fourth quarter

- UCD – Samuel Gbatu Jr. 27-yard pass from Caden Pinnick (Hunter Ridley kick), 14:54. Aggies 40–20. Drive: 9 plays, 84 yards, 4:49.
- UCD – Zach Jones 35-yard pass from Caden Pinnick (Hunter Ridley kick), 3:31. Aggies 47–20. Drive: 5 plays, 76 yards, 3:11.
- URI – Marquis Buchanan 4-yard pass from Devin Farrell (pass failed), 1:11. Aggies 47–26. Drive: 11 plays, 73 yards, 2:14.

Statistics	URI	UCD
First downs	17	25
Plays–yards	67–467	72–553
Rushes–yards	27–173	43–276
Passing yards	294	277
Passing: Comp–Att–Int	22–40–0	17–29–1
Turnovers	1	1
Time of possession	29:35	30:25

Team	Category	Player	Statistics
Rhode Island	Passing	Devin Farrell	22/40, 294 yards, 2 TD
Rhode Island	Rushing	Antwain Littleton Jr.	16 carries, 123 yards, 2 TD
Rhode Island	Receiving	Marquis Buchanan	5 receptions, 113 yards, 2 TD
UC Davis	Passing	Caden Pinnick	17/29, 277 yards, 5 TD, INT
UC Davis	Rushing	Jordan Fisher	16 carries, 140 yards, TD
UC Davis	Receiving	Samuel Gbatu Jr.	4 receptions, 121 yards, TD

== Ranking movements ==
Ranking movements Legend: ██ Increase in ranking ██ Decrease in ranking т = Tied with team above or below
	Week														
Poll	Pre	1	2	3	4	5	6	7	8	9	10	11	12	13	Final
STATS FCS	9	9	6	7	6	8	17	16	13	13	14	11	10	8	11
Coaches	10	8	5	6т	7	10	18	15	13	12	10т	9	9	9	10
