= Landen Clark =

American football player

No. 11 – LSU Tigers
- Position: Quarterback
- Class: Redshirt Sophomore

Personal information
- Born: 10/27/2005
- Listed height: 6 ft 0 in (1.83 m)
- Listed weight: 193 lb (88 kg)

Career information
- High school: Radford
- College: Elon (2024–2025); LSU (2026–present)

Awards and highlights
- CAA Co-Offensive Rookie of the Year (2025); Third-team Freshman All-American (2025)
- Stats at ESPN

Landen Clark is an American college football quarterback for the LSU Tigers. He previously played for the Elon Phoenix.

== Early life ==
Clark grew up in Radford, Virginia, and attended Radford High School. As a senior in 2023, he led the Bobcats to a perfect 15–0 record and the program's first VHSL Class 2 state championship in 51 years, defeating Riverheads 39–21 in the title game. Clark accounted for over 4,300 total yards and 71 touchdowns that season.

He was named Class 2 Offensive Player of the Year by the VHSL, a two-time region Player of the Year, and WSLS Player of the Year. During his junior year, he accumulated over 3,300 yards and 52 touchdowns while leading the team to a 10–2 record.

In addition to football, Clark was a state champion in track and field and a state runner-up in basketball.

== College career ==
=== Elon ===
Clark committed to Elon University in 2023 and enrolled in 2024.

As a true freshman in 2024, he appeared in four games, rushing for 11 yards on four carries.

In 2025, as a redshirt freshman and starting quarterback, Clark completed 155 of 277 passes (56.0%) for 2,321 yards, 18 touchdowns, and 8 interceptions. He added 614 rushing yards and 11 touchdowns on 189 carries, accounting for 29 total touchdowns. He earned three CAA Rookie of the Week honors, was named CAA Co-Offensive Rookie of the Year, and was a finalist for the Jerry Rice Award (FCS freshman of the year). He also received third-team Freshman All-American honors from Phil Steele.

Clark entered the NCAA transfer portal on December 2, 2025.

=== LSU ===
On January 11, 2026, Clark committed to transfer to LSU, choosing the Tigers over offers from Michigan, Kentucky, and James Madison. He transferred with three years of eligibility remaining and became LSU's first transfer portal quarterback addition under head coach Lane Kiffin.

== Personal life ==
Clark is the son of Darrenn and Heather Clark and has a brother, Hayden.
