= 2025 Fordham Rams football team =

American college football season

2025 Fordham Rams football
- Conference: Patriot League
- Record: 1–11 (1–6 Patriot)
- Head coach: Joe Conlin (8th season)
- Offensive coordinator: Art Asselta (3rd season)
- Defensive coordinator: Allen Gant (2nd season)
- Home stadium: Coffey Field

2025 Patriot League football standings
	Conf.			Overall
Team	W		L	W		L
No. 10 Lehigh $^	7	–	0	12	–	1
Lafayette	6	–	1	8	–	4
Holy Cross	3	–	4	3	–	9
Richmond	3	–	4	7	–	5
Georgetown	3	–	4	6	–	6
Colgate	3	–	4	5	–	7
Bucknell	2	–	5	5	–	7
Fordham	1	–	6	1	–	11
$ – Conference champion; ^ – FCS playoff participant; Rankings from STATS Poll

The 2025 Fordham Rams football team represented Fordham University as a member of the Patriot League during the 2025 NCAA Division I FCS football season. The Rams were led by eighth-year head coach Joe Conlin and played at the Coffey Field in The Bronx, New York.

== Schedule ==
Date	Time	Opponent	Site	TV	Result	Attendance
August 30	2:00 p.m.	at Boston College*	Alumni Stadium; Chestnut Hill, MA	ACCNX/ESPN+	L 10–66	41,221
September 6	6:00 p.m.	No. 21 Monmouth*	Coffey Field; The Bronx, NY	ESPN+	L 28–49	2,487
September 13	3:30 p.m.	at Stony Brook*	Kenneth P. LaValle Stadium; Stony Brook, NY	FloSports	L 18–41	5,769
September 20	1:00 p.m.	at Colgate	Crown Field at Andy Kerr Stadium; Hamilton, NY	ESPN+	L 21–44	2,581
September 27	1:00 p.m.	Holy Cross	Coffey Field; The Bronx, NY (Ram–Crusader Cup)	ESPN+	W 26–21	2,039
October 4	12:30 p.m.	at Lafayette	Fisher Stadium; Easton, PA	ESPN+	L 10–24	4,020
October 18	1:00 p.m.	Dartmouth*^{†}	Coffey Field; The Bronx, NY	ESPN+	L 13–30	3,814
October 25	1:00 p.m.	No. 7 Lehigh	Coffey Field; The Bronx, NY	ESPN+	L 6–27	4,893
November 1	2:00 p.m.	at Richmond	E. Claiborne Robins Stadium; Richmond, VA	ESPN+	L 14–17	4,847
November 8	1:00 p.m.	Bucknell	Coffey Field; The Bronx, NY	ESPN+	L 19–37	2,235
November 15	1:00 p.m.	at Georgetown	Cooper Field; Washington, DC	ESPN+	L 0–14	1,596
November 22	12:00 p.m.	at Merrimack*	Duane Stadium; North Andover, MA	ESPN+	L 26–27	1,964
*Non-conference game; ^{†}Homecoming; Rankings from STATS Poll released prior to the game; All times are in Eastern time

== Game summaries ==
=== at Boston College (FBS) ===
Fordham Rams (0–0) at Boston College Eagles (FBS) (0–0) – Game summary

Quarter	1	2	3	4	Total
Rams	3	0	0	7	10
Eagles (FBS)	14	7	24	21	66

at Alumni Stadium • Chestnut Hill, Massachusetts

- Date: August 30
- Game time: 2:00 p.m.
- Game weather: Sunny, 73 degrees
- Game attendance: 41,221
- Referee: Tim Hedgepeth
- TV announcers (ACCNX/ESPN+): Kevin Connors, Craig Haubert

Game information

First quarter

- BC – Jordan McDonald 11-yard pass from Dylan Lonergan (Luca Lombardo kick), 8:31. Eagles 7–0. Drive: 13 plays, 71 yards, 6:24.
- FORD – Bennett Henderson 46-yard field goal, 6:04. Eagles 7–3. Drive: 8 plays, 35 yards, 2:17.
- BC – Jaedn Skeete 11-yard pass from Dylan Lonergan (Luca Lombardo kick), 3:19. Eagles 14–3. Drive: 6 plays, 84 yards, 2:39.

Second quarter

- BC – Jaedn Skeete 13-yard pass from Dylan Lonergan (Luca Lombardo kick), 0:26. Eagles 21–3. Drive: 10 plays, 82 yards, 1:18.

Third quarter

- BC – Daveon Crouch 28-yard interception return (Luca Lombardo kick), 14:47. Eagles 28–3.
- BC – Luca Lombardo 48-yard field goal, 10:59. Eagles 31–3. Drive: 4 plays, 5 yards, 2:16.
- BC – Reed Harris 17-yard pass from Dylan Lonergan (Luca Lombardo kick), 5:21. Eagles 38–3. Drive: 9 plays, 51 yards, 4:07.
- BC – Turbo Richard 4-yard run (Luca Lombardo kick), 0:30. Eagles 45–3. Drive: 5 plays, 19 yards, 2:32.

Fourth quarter

- BC – Alex Broome 1-yard run (Luca Lombardo kick), 10:56. Eagles 52–3. Drive: 7 plays, 84 yards, 3:25.
- BC – Bo MacCormack III 2-yard run (Luca Lombardo kick), 9:11. Eagles 59–3. Drive: 2 plays, 57 yards, 0:28.
- FORD – Gunnar Smith 1-yard run (Bennett Henderson kick), 5:00. Eagles 59–10. Drive: 12 plays, 75 yards, 4:11.
- BC – Dawson Pough 22-yard pass from Grayson James (Luca Lombardo kick), 1:55. Eagles 66–10. Drive: 6 plays, 75 yards, 3:05.

Statistics	FOR	BC
First downs	13	26
Plays–yards	66–168	77–556
Rushes–yards	27–16	38–98
Passing yards	152	458
Passing: comp–att–int	20–39–1	31–39–0
Turnovers	1	0
Time of possession	25:55	34:05

Team	Category	Player	Statistics
Fordham	Passing	Gunnar Smith	20/39, 152 yards, INT
Fordham	Rushing	Ricky Parks	9 carries, 18 yards
Fordham	Receiving	Nodin Tracy	3 receptions, 34 yards
Boston College	Passing	Dylan Lonergan	26/34, 268 yards, 4 TD
Boston College	Rushing	Turbo Richard	16 carries, 48 yards, TD
Boston College	Receiving	Lewis Bond	11 receptions, 138 yards

=== No. 21 Monmouth ===
No. 21 Monmouth Hawks (1-0) at Fordham Rams (0-1) – Game summary

Quarter	1	2	3	4	Total
No. 21 Hawks	21	13	0	15	49
Rams	14	7	7	0	28

at Coffey Field • New York City, NY

- Date: September 6
- Game time: 6:00 PM EDT
- Game weather: Rain, Temperature: 74 °F (23 °C), Wind: at 6 miles per hour (9.7 km/h) SW
- Game attendance: 0
- Referee: Todd Bowman
- TV announcers (ESPN+): Andrew Bogusch (play-by-play) and Andrew Posadas (analyst)

Game information

First quarter

- FOR – Gunnar Smith 4-yard run (Bennett Henderson kick), 9:50. Rams 7–0. Drive: 4 plays, 25 yards, 1:14.
- MONM – Josh Derry 29-yard pass from Derek Robertson (Hudson Fiene kick), Tied 7–7. Drive: 7 plays, 90 yards (TOP/Score Time unavailable).
- FOR – Jabril Carter 12-yard pass from Gunnar Smith (Bennett Henderson kick), 4:09. Rams 14–7. Drive: 6 plays, 78 yards (TOP unavailable).
- MONM – Josh Derry 67-yard pass from Derek Robertson (Hudson Fiene kick), 3:51. Tied 14–14. Drive: 1 play, 67 yards, 0:11.
- MONM – TJ Speight 22-yard pass from Derek Robertson (Hudson Fiene kick), 0:00. Hawks 21–14. Drive: 9 plays, 70 yards, 3:26.

Second quarter

- FOR – Jack Betten 70-yard pass from Gunnar Smith (Bennett Henderson kick), 13:19. Tied 21–21. Drive: 5 plays, 80 yards, 1:36.
- MONM – TJ Speight 2-yard pass from Derek Robertson (Hudson Fiene kick), 9:41. Hawks 28–21. Drive: 8 plays, 17 yards, 3:19.
- MONM – Josh Derry 7-yard pass from Derek Robertson (Hudson Fiene kick BLOCKED), 1:15. Hawks 34–21. Drive: 9 plays, 55 yards, 3:13.

Third quarter

- FOR – Troy Worrell 6-yard pass from Gunnar Smith (Bennett Henderson kick), 11:50. Hawks 34–28. Drive: 8 plays, 75 yards, 3:10.

Fourth quarter

- MONM – Derek Robertson 1-yard run (Josh Derry–Derek Henderson pass), 14:52. Hawks 42–28. Drive: 13 plays, 64 yards, 4:48.
- MONM – Josh Derry 3-yard pass from Derek Robertson (Hudson Fiene kick), 1:56. Hawks 49–28. Drive: 10 plays, 49 yards, 4:53.

Statistics	MONM	FOR
First downs	25	23
Total yards	469	421
Rushes–yards	37–127	25–39
Passing yards	342	382
Passing: Comp–Att–Int	29–43–1	27–49–1
Turnovers	1	2
Time of possession	28:47	31:13

Team	Category	Player	Statistics
Monmouth	Passing	Derek Robertson	29/43, 342 yards, 6 TD, INT
Monmouth	Rushing	Rodney Nelson	25 carries, 112 yards
Monmouth	Receiving	Josh Derry	10 receptions, 144 yards, 4 TD
Fordham	Passing	Gunnar Smith	27/49, 382 yards, 3 TD, INT
Fordham	Rushing	Jamell James	9 carries, 31 yards
Fordham	Receiving	Jack Freeburg	3 receptions, 89 yards

=== at Stony Brook ===
Fordham Rams (0-2) at Stony Brook Seawolves (0-2) – Game summary

Quarter	1	2	3	4	Total
Rams	0	0	10	8	18
Seawolves	3	10	14	14	41

at Kenneth P. LaValle Stadium • Stony Brook, NY

- Date: September 13
- Game time: 3:30 PM EDT
- Game attendance: 5,769
- Referee: Antonio Marcella
- TV announcers (FloSports): Jonny Wincott (play-by-play), Brandon London (analyst) and Johnny Gadamowitz (sideline)

Game information

First quarter

- STBK – Enda Kirby 26-yard field goal, 11:37. Seawolves 3–0. Drive: 10 plays, 57 yards, 3:23.

Second quarter

- STBK – Chris Zellous 8-yard run (Enda Kirby kick), 12:49. Seawolves 10–0. Drive: 1 play, 8 yards, 0:05.
- STBK – Michael Mannino 49-yard field goal, 2:33. Seawolves 13–0. Drive: 5 plays, 14 yards, 1:22.

Third quarter

- FOR – Bennett Henderson 24-yard field goal, 8:42. Seawolves 13–3. Drive: 9 plays, 25 yards, 3:16.
- FOR – Troy Worrell 35-yard pass from Gunnar Smith (Bennett Henderson kick), 8:19. Seawolves 13–10. Drive: 1 play, 35 yards, 0:16.
- STBK – MarQeese Dietz 93-yard pass from Chris Zellous (Enda Kirby kick), 7:29. Seawolves 20–10. Drive: 2 plays, 90 yards, 0:45.
- STBK – Jayce Freeman 19-yard pass from Chris Zellous (Enda Kirby kick), 2:47. Seawolves 27–10. Drive: 9 plays, 74 yards, 3:44.

Fourth quarter

- STBK – Jayce Freeman 15-yard pass from Chris Zellous (Enda Kirby kick), 9:34. Seawolves 34–10. Drive: 5 plays, 39 yards, 2:07.
- STBK – DaMario Crawford 52-yard interception return (Enda Kirby kick), 8:26. Seawolves 41–10.
- FOR – Jacob Rodriguez 1-yard run (Gunnar Smith–Jacob Rodriguez pass), 2:45. Seawolves 41–18. Drive: 15 plays, 78 yards, 5:31.

Statistics	FOR	STBK
First downs	15	20
Total yards	287	441
Rushes–yards	44–124	38–181
Passing yards	163	260
Passing: Comp–Att–Int	16–33–2	21–28–1
Turnovers	3	2
Time of possession	32:52	27:08

Team	Category	Player	Statistics
Fordham	Passing	Gunnar Smith	16/33, 163 yards, TD, 2 INT
Fordham	Rushing	Jamell James	10 carries, 45 yards
Fordham	Receiving	Jack Freeburg	4 receptions, 54 yards
Stony Brook	Passing	Chris Zellous	21/28, 260 yards, 3 TD, INT
Stony Brook	Rushing	Roland Dempster	18 carries, 94 yards
Stony Brook	Receiving	MarQeese Dietz	6 receptions, 120 yards, TD

=== at Colgate ===
Fordham Rams (0-3) at Colgate Raiders (0-3) – Game summary

Quarter	1	2	3	4	Total
Rams	14	7	0	0	21
Raiders	14	16	7	7	44

at Crown Field at Andy Kerr Stadium • Hamilton, NY

- Date: September 20
- Game time: 1:00 p.m. EDT
- Game weather: Sunny • Temperature: 66 °F (19 °C) • Wind: E at 4 miles per hour (6.4 km/h)
- Game attendance: 2,581
- Referee: Cory Hanson
- TV announcers (ESPN+): Eric Malanoski (play-by-play), Terry Dow (analyst) and Faith Cain (sideline)

Game information

First Quarter

- COLG - Winston Moore 78-yard pass from Zach Osborne (Luke Vogeler kick), 14:09. Raiders 7-0. Drive: 1 play, 78 yards, 0:09.
- FOR - Jabril Carter 39-yard pass from Gunnar Smith (Bennett Henderson kick), 11:20. Tied 7-7. Drive: 8 plays, 75 yards, 2:49.
- COLG - Danny Shaban 4-yard run (Luke Vogeler kick), 8:36. Raiders 14-7. Drive: 8 plays, 84 yards, 2:37.
- FOR- Jack Freeburg 5-yard pass from Gunnar Smith (Bennett Henderson kick), 2:19. Tied 14-14. Drive: 13 plays, 73 yards, 6:09.

Second Quarter

- COLG - Zach Osborne 4-yard run (Two-Point Conversion Failed), 13:48. Raiders 20-14. Drive: 11 plays, 69 yards, 3:22.
- COLG - Luke Vogeler 25-yard Field Goal, 6:56. Raiders 23-14. Drive: 10 plays, 60 yards, 5:28.
- FOR - Jack Freeburg 24-yard pass from Gunnar Smith (Bennett Henderson kick), 3:50. Raiders 23-21. Drive: 8 plays, 65 yards, 3:06.
- COLG - Reed Swanson 13-yard pass from Zach Osborne (Luke Vogeler kick), 2:11. Raiders 30-21. Drive: 5 plays, 75 yards, 1:39.

Third Quarter

- COLG - Jaker Stearney 5-yard run (Luke Vogeler kick), 2:56. Raiders 37-21. Drive: 15 plays, 68 yards, 7:09.

Fourth Quarter

- COLG - Treyvhon Saunders 35-yard pass from Jake Stearney (Luke Vogeler kick), 13:33. Raiders 44-21. Drive: 5 plays, 49 yards, 2:14.

Statistics	FOR	COLG
First downs	19	27
Total yards	307	547
Rushing yards	94	216
Passing yards	213	331
Passing: Comp–Att–Int	24-42-1	22-33-0
Time of possession	26:21	33:39

Team	Category	Player	Statistics
Fordham	Passing	Gunnar Smith	24/42, 213 yards, 3 TD, INT
Fordham	Rushing	Ricky Parks	8 carries, 31 yards
Fordham	Receiving	Jack Freeburg	7 receptions, 57 yards, 2 TD
Colgate	Passing	Zach Osborne	13/16, 219 yards, 2 TD
Colgate	Rushing	Cole Fulton	16 carries, 97 yards
Colgate	Receiving	Winston Moore	4 receptions, 126 yards, TD

=== Holy Cross (Ram–Crusader Cup) ===
Holy Cross Crusaders (0-4) vs. Fordham Rams (0-4) – Game summary

Quarter	1	2	3	4	Total
Crusaders	7	14	0	0	21
Rams	14	6	3	3	26

at Coffey Field • New York City, NY

- Date: September 27
- Game time: 1:00 PM EDT
- Game weather: Sunny • Temperature: 76 °F (24 °C) • Wind: NE at 6 miles per hour (9.7 km/h)
- Game attendance: 2,039
- Referee: Alexander Randolph
- TV announcers (ESPN+): Andrew Bogusch (play-by-play) and Andrew Posadas (analyst)

Game information

First Quarter

- FOR - Ricky Parks 45-yard run (Bennett Henderson kick), 14:02. Rams 7-0. Drive: 2 plays, 80 yards, 0:51.
- FOR - Gunnar Smith 2-yard run (Bennett Henderson kick), 4:12. Rams 14-0. Drive: 10 plays, 74 yards, 3:55.
- HC - Cal Swanson 2-yard run (Luis Palenzuela kick), 1:18. Rams 14-7. Drive: 6 plays, 50 yards, 2:54.

Second Quarter

- FOR - Nodin Tracy 31-yard pass from Gunnar Smith (Bennett Henderson PAT failed), 14:20. Rams 20-7. Drive: 6 plays, 76 yards, 1:52.
- HC - Mason McSweeney 6-yard pass from Cal Swanson (Luis Palenzuela kick), 7:07. Rams 20-14. Drive: 13 plays, 75 yards, 7:06.
- HC - Jayden Clerveaux 5-yard run (Luis Palenzuela kick), 2:38. Crusaders 21-20. Drive: 6 plays, 76 yards, 2:46.

Third Quarter

- FOR - Bennett Henderson 36-yard Field Goal, 8:02. Rams 23-21. Drive: 10 plays, 56 yards, 5:21.

Fourth Quarter

- FOR - Bennett Henderson 35-yard Field Goal, 8:28. Rams 26-21. Drive: 9 plays, 55 yards, 4:45.

Statistics	HC	FOR
First downs	20	17
Total yards	345	422
Rushing yards	102	168
Passing yards	243	254
Passing: Comp–Att–Int	27-43-1	14-21-0
Time of possession	34:55	25:05

Team	Category	Player	Statistics
Holy Cross	Passing	Cal Swanson	18/27, 186 yards
Holy Cross	Rushing	Jayden Clerveaux	17 carries, 84 yards, TD
Holy Cross	Receiving	Max Mosey	7 receptions, 70 yards
Fordham	Passing	Gunnar Smith	14/21, 254 yards, TD
Fordham	Rushing	Ricky Parks	12 carries, 85 yards, TD
Fordham	Receiving	Ricky Gonzalez II	2 receptions, 55 yards

=== at Lafayette ===
Fordham Rams (1-4) vs. Lafayette Leopards (3-2) – Game summary

Quarter	1	2	3	4	Total
Rams	0	0	0	10	10
Leopards	0	14	7	3	24

at Fisher Stadium • Easton, PA

- Date: October 4
- Game time: 12:30 PM EDT
- Game weather: Sunny
- Game attendance: 4,020
- Referee: Marc Queen
- TV announcers (ESPN+): Gary Laubach (play-by-play), Mike Joseph (analyst) and Megan Caffrey (sideline)

Game information

First Quarter

No scoring plays

Second Quarter

- LAF - Matthew Scerbo 6-yard pass from Dean DeNobile (Jack Simonetta kick), 9:57. Leopards 7-0. Drive: 5 plays, 41 yards, 1:38.
- LAF - Carson Persing 3-yard pass from Dean DeNobile (Jack Simonetta kick), 3:52. Leopards 14-0. Drive: 9 plays, 94 yards, 4:24.

Third Quarter

- LAF - Dylan Aguilera 18-yard punt return (Jack Simonetta kick), 5:17. Leopards 21-0. Drive: 3 plays 74 yards, 1:55.

Fourth Quarter

- FOR - Troy Worrell 4-yard pass from Gunnar Smith (Bennett Henderson kick), 13:57. Leopards 21-7. Drive: 11 plays, 83 yards, 3:52.
- FOR - Bennett Henderson 35-yard Field Goal, 9:01. Leopards 21-10. Drive: 9 plays, 46 yards, 3:13.
- LAF - Jack Simonetta 19-yard Field Goal, 4:28. Leopards 24-10. Drive: 9 plays, 73 yards, 4:23.

Statistics	FOR	LAF
First downs	23	19
Total yards	405	402
Rushing yards	52	83
Passing yards	354	319
Passing: Comp–Att–Int	32–45–1	26–36–1
Time of possession	29:10	30:50

Team	Category	Player	Statistics
Fordham	Passing	Gunnar Smith	32/45, 354 yards, TD, INT
Fordham	Rushing	Ricky Parks	12 carries, 45 yards
Fordham	Receiving	Jack Freeburg	5 receptions, 113 yards
Lafayette	Passing	Dean DeNobile	25/35, 314 yards, 2 TD, INT
Lafayette	Rushing	Ethan Weber	19 carries, 67 yards
Lafayette	Receiving	Elijah Steward	5 receptions, 85 yards

=== Dartmouth ===
Dartmouth Big Green (3-1) vs. Fordham Rams (1-5) – Game summary

Quarter	1	2	3	4	Total
Big Green	0	6	10	14	30
Rams	0	6	0	7	13

at Coffey Field • New York City, NY

- Date: October 18
- Game time: 1:00 PM EDT
- Game attendance: 3,814
- Referee: Todd Boyd
- TV announcers (ESPN+): Andrew Bogusch (play-by-play) and Andrew Posadas (analyst)

Game information

First Quarter

Second Quarter

- DART - Owen Zalc 42-yard Field Goal, 11:34. Big Green 3-0. Drive: 7 plays, 36 yards, 3:14.
- FOR - Bennett Henderson 29-yard Field Goal, 4:42. Tied 3-3. Drive: 15 plays, 76 yards, 6:44.
- DART - Owen Zalc 33-yard Field Goal, 0:40. Big Green 6-3. Drive: 12 plays 60 yards, 4:02.
- FOR - Bennett Henderson 22-yard Field Goal, 0:00. Tied 6-6. Drive: 3 plays, 23 yards, 0:15.

Third Quarter

- DART - D.J. Crowther 20-yard run (Owen Zalc kick), 13:27. Big Green 13-6. Drive: 5 plays, 42 yards, 1:33.
- DART - Owen Zalc 24-yard Field Goal, 3:53. Big Green 16-6. Drive: 8 plays, 64 yards, 2:56.

Fourth Quarter

- FOR - Jack Freeburg 5-yard pass from Gunnar Smith (Bennett Henderson kick), 11:37. Big Green 16-13. Drive: 2 plays, 36 yards, 0:43.
- DART - Luke Rives 24-yard pass from Grayson Saunier (Owen Zalc kick), 9:21. Big Green 23-13. Drive: 5 plays, 75 yards, 2:16.
- DART - Grayson O'Bara 33-yard pass from Grayson Saunier (Owen Zalc kick), 4:32. Big Green 30-13. Drive: 5 plays, 60 yards, 3:05.

Statistics	DART	FOR
First downs	20	17
Total yards	461	328
Rushing yards	180	90
Passing yards	281	238
Passing: Comp–Att–Int	21-29-0	21-35-1
Time of possession	30:42	29:18

Team	Category	Player	Statistics
Dartmouth	Passing	Grayson Saunier	21/29, 281 yards, 2 TD
Dartmouth	Rushing	D.J. Crowther	18 carries, 91 yards, TD
Dartmouth	Receiving	Grayson O'Bara	7 receptions, 104 yards, TD
Fordham	Passing	Gunnar Smith	21/35, 238 yards, TD, INT
Fordham	Rushing	Ricky Parks	12 carries, 46 yards
Fordham	Receiving	Jack Freeburg	6 receptions, 64 yards, TD

=== No. 7 Lehigh ===
No. 7 Lehigh Mountain Hawks (7-0) vs. Fordham Rams (1-6) – Game summary

Quarter	1	2	3	4	Total
No. 7 Mountain Hawks	3	7	14	3	27
Rams	0	0	6	0	6

at Coffey Field • New York City, NY

- Date: October 25
- Game time: 1:00 PM EDT
- Game weather: Sunny • Temperature: 58 °F (14 °C) • Wind: NW at 4 miles per hour (6.4 km/h)
- Game attendance: 4,893
- Referee: Antonio Marcella
- TV announcers (ESPN+): Andrew Bogusch (play-by-play) and Andrew Posadas (analyst)

Game information

First Quarter

- LEH - Nick Garrido 36-yard Field Goal, 10:57. Mountain Hawks 3-0. Drive: 8 plays, 49 yards, 3:55.

Second Quarter

- LEH - Hayden Johnson 1-yard run (Nick Garrido kick), 4:21. Mountain Hawks 10-0. Drive: 14 plays, 79 yards, 7:36.

Third Quarter

- LEH - Luke Yoder 7-yard run (Nick Garrido kick), 8:21. Mountain Hawks 17-0. Drive: 8 plays, 80 yards, 3:57.
- LEH - Jaden Green 1-yard run (Nick Garrido kick), 4:44. Mountain Hawks 24-0. Drive: 6 plays, 45 yards, 2:40.
- FOR - Gunnar Smith 1-yard run (Two Point Conversion Failed), 0:15. Mountain Hawks 24-6. Drive: 12 plays, 26 yards, 4:29.

Fourth Quarter

- LEH - Nick Garrido 22-yard Field Goal, 1:50. Mountain Hawks 27-6. Drive: 13 plays, 93 yards, 7:31.

Statistics	LEH	FOR
First downs	22	17
Total yards	429	277
Rushing yards	158	74
Passing yards	271	203
Passing: Comp–Att–Int	18–27–0	17–32–0
Time of possession	35:19	24:41

Team	Category	Player	Statistics
Lehigh	Passing	Hayden Johnson	17/26, 267 yards
Lehigh	Rushing	Luke Yoder	16 carries, 79 yards, TD
Lehigh	Receiving	Geoffrey Jamiel	6 receptions, 85 yards
Fordham	Passing	Gunnar Smith	17/32, 203 yards
Fordham	Rushing	Ricky Parks	8 carries, 37 yards
Fordham	Receiving	Jack Betten	2 receptions, 87 yards

=== at Richmond ===
Fordham Rams (1-7) vs. Richmond Spiders (4-4) – Game summary

Quarter	1	2	3	4	Total
Rams	7	0	0	7	14
Spiders	7	3	7	0	17

at E. Claiborne Robins Stadium • Richmond, VA

- Date: November 1
- Game time: 2:00 p.m. EDT
- Game weather: Sunny • Temperature: 92 °F (33 °C) • Wind: E at 6 miles per hour (9.7 km/h)
- Game attendance: 4,847
- Referee: Terry Jones
- TV announcers (ESPN+): Bob Black (play-by-play), Chris Anderson (analyst) and Tamara Brown (sideline)

Game information

First Quarter

- (9:52) RICH - Kyle Wickersham 5-yard pass to Ja'Vion Griffin, Jayden Alsheskie kick (Drive: 9 Plays, 75 yards, 5:08; RICH 7–0)
- (5:14) FOR - Gunnar Smith 4-yard pass to Jack Freeburg, Bennett Henderson kick (Drive: 3 Plays, 4 yards, 0:40; TIED 7–7)

Second Quarter

- (14:13) RICH - Jayden Alsheskie 36-yard field goal (Drive: 13 Plays, 56 yards, 6:01; RICH 10–7)

Third Quarter

- (3:47) RICH - Kyle Wickersham 4-yard run, Jayden Alsheskie kick (Drive: 3 Plays, 53 yards, 1:39; RICH 17–7)

Fourth Quarter

- (8:18) FOR - Jack Kaiser 4-yard run, Bennett Henderson kick (Drive: 10 Plays, 70 yards, 4:33; RICH 17–14)

Statistics	FOR	RICH
First downs	12	16
Total yards	161	323
Rushing yards	70	130
Passing yards	91	193
Passing: Comp–Att–Int	19–36–2	23–35–1
Time of possession	27:27	32:33

Team	Category	Player	Statistics
Fordham	Passing	Gunnar Smith	19/36, 91 yards, TD
Fordham	Rushing	Gunnar Smith	14 carries, 41 yards
Fordham	Receiving	Jaden Allen	4 receptions, 30 yards
Richmond	Passing	Kyle Wickersham	23/35, 193 yards, TD
Richmond	Rushing	Aziz Foster-Powell	15 carries, 62 yards
Richmond	Receiving	Isaiah Dawson	7 receptions, 76 yards

=== Bucknell ===
Bucknell Bison (4-5) vs. Fordham Rams (1-8) – Game summary

Quarter	1	2	3	4	Total
Bison	-	-	-	-	0
Rams	-	-	-	-	0

at Coffey Field • New York City, NY

- Date: November 8
- Game time: 1:00 PM EST
- TV: ESPN+

Statistics	BUCK	FOR
First downs		
Total yards		
Rushing yards		
Passing yards		
Passing: Comp–Att–Int		
Time of possession		

Team	Category	Player	Statistics
Bucknell	Passing		
Bucknell	Rushing		
Bucknell	Receiving		
Fordham	Passing		
Fordham	Rushing		
Fordham	Receiving		

=== at Georgetown ===
Fordham Rams (1-9) vs. Georgetown Hoyas (5-5) – Game summary

Quarter	1	2	3	4	Total
Rams	-	-	-	-	0
Hoyas	-	-	-	-	0

at Cooper Field • Washington, DC

- Date: November 15
- Game time: 1:00 PM EST
- TV: ESPN+

Statistics	FOR	GTWN
First downs		
Total yards		
Rushing yards		
Passing yards		
Passing: Comp–Att–Int		
Time of possession		

Team	Category	Player	Statistics
Fordham	Passing		
Fordham	Rushing		
Fordham	Receiving		
Georgetown	Passing		
Georgetown	Rushing		
Georgetown	Receiving		

=== at Merrimack ===
Fordham Rams (0-0) vs. Merrimack Warriors (0-0) – Game summary

Quarter	1	2	3	4	Total
Rams	-	-	-	-	0
Warriors	-	-	-	-	0

at Duane Stadium • North Andover, MA

- Date: November 22
- Game time: 12:00 p.m. EDT

Statistics	FOR	MRMK
First downs		
Total yards		
Rushing yards		
Passing yards		
Passing: Comp–Att–Int		
Time of possession		

Team	Category	Player	Statistics
Fordham	Passing		
Fordham	Rushing		
Fordham	Receiving		
Merrimack	Passing		
Merrimack	Rushing		
Merrimack	Receiving		
