= 2025 Colgate Raiders football team =

American college football season

2025 Colgate Raiders football
- Conference: Patriot League
- Record: 5–7 (3–4 Patriot)
- Head coach: Curt Fitzpatrick (1st season)
- Defensive coordinator: Trevor Warner (1st season)
- Home stadium: Crown Field at Andy Kerr Stadium

2025 Patriot League football standings
	Conf.			Overall
Team	W		L	W		L
No. 10 Lehigh $^	7	–	0	12	–	1
Lafayette	6	–	1	8	–	4
Holy Cross	3	–	4	3	–	9
Richmond	3	–	4	7	–	5
Georgetown	3	–	4	6	–	6
Colgate	3	–	4	5	–	7
Bucknell	2	–	5	5	–	7
Fordham	1	–	6	1	–	11
$ – Conference champion; ^ – FCS playoff participant; Rankings from STATS Poll

The 2025 Colgate Raiders football team represented Colgate University as a member of the Patriot League during the 2025 NCAA Division I FCS football season. The Raiders were led by first-year head coach Curt Fitzpatrick and played at the Crown Field at Andy Kerr Stadium in Hamilton, New York.

== Schedule ==
Date	Time	Opponent	Site	TV	Result	Attendance
August 29	7:00 p.m.	No. 22 Monmouth*	Crown Field at Andy Kerr Stadium; Hamilton, NY	ESPN+	L 39–42	3,032
September 6	6:00 p.m.	at No. 13 Villanova*	Villanova Stadium; Villanova, PA	FloSports	L 17–24	4,151
September 12	7:00 p.m.	at Syracuse*	JMA Wireless Dome; Syracuse, NY (rivalry)	ACCN	L 24–66	37,372
September 20	1:00 p.m.	Fordham^{†}	Crown Field at Andy Kerr Stadium; Hamilton, NY	ESPN+	W 44–21	2,581
October 4	2:00 p.m.	at Cornell*	Schoellkopf Field; Ithaca, NY (rivalry)	ESPN+	W 41–21	12,142
October 11	1:00 p.m.	Richmond	Crown Field at Andy Kerr Stadium; Hamilton, NY	ESPN+	L 19–24	1,584
October 18	1:00 p.m.	at Georgetown	Cooper Field; Washington, DC	ESPN+	L 17–21	2,345
October 25	1:00 p.m.	at Holy Cross	Fitton Field; Worcester, MA	ESPN+	W 29–28	9,724
November 1	1:00 p.m.	Merrimack*	Crown Field at Andy Kerr Stadium; Hamilton, NY	ESPN+	W 23–20 ^{OT}	2,713
November 8	12:30 p.m.	at Lafayette	Fisher Stadium; Easton, PA	ESPN+	L 42–59	4,259
November 15	1:00 p.m.	No. 4 Lehigh	Crown Field at Andy Kerr Stadium; Hamilton, NY	ESPN+	L 7–27	1,227
November 22	1:00 p.m.	Bucknell	Crown Field at Andy Kerr Stadium; Hamilton, NY	ESPN+	W 38–19	1,170
*Non-conference game; ^{†}Homecoming; Rankings from STATS Poll released prior to the game; All times are in Eastern time

== Game summaries ==
=== No. 22 Monmouth ===
No. 22 Monmouth Hawks (0-0) at Colgate Raiders (0-0) – Game summary

Quarter	1	2	3	4	Total
No. 22 Hawks	0	7	14	21	42
Raiders	14	10	7	8	39

at Andy Kerr Stadium • Hamilton, NY

- Date: August 29
- Game time: 7:00 PM EDT
- Game attendance: 3,032
- Referee: Antonio Marcella
- TV announcers (ESPN+): Eric Malanoski (play-by-play), Terry Dow (analyst) and Faith Cain (sideline)

Game information

First quarter

- COLG – Marco Maldonado 4-yard run (Luke Vogeler kick), 10:17. Raiders 7–0. Drive: 5 plays, 80 yards, 1:35.
- COLG – Treyvhon Saunders 13-yard pass from Zach Osborne (Lukle Vogeler kick), 2:39. Raiders 14–0. Drive: 7 plays, 80 yards, 3:16.

Second quarter

- MONM – Tra Neal 13-yard pass from Derek Robertson (Hudson Fiene kick), 13:37. Raiders 14–7. Drive: 11 plays, 80 yards, 3:56.
- COLG – Luke Vogeler 42-yard field goal, 9:20. Raiders 17–7. Drive: 10 plays, 47 yards, 4:09.
- COLG – Treyvhon Saunders 22-yard pass from Zach Osborne (Luke Vogeler kick), 2:57. Raiders 24–7. Drive: 8 plays, 80 yards, 4:10.

Third quarter

- COLG – Brendan Cassamajor 2-yard pass from Jake Stearney (Luke Vogeler kick), 8:23. Raiders 31–7. Drive: 12 plays, 45 yards, 6:37.
- MONM – Gavin Nelson 70-yard pass from Derek Robertson (Derek Robertson–Josh Derry pass), 7:15. Raiders 31–14. Drive: 3 plays, 80 yards, 0:45.
- MONM – Rodney Nelson 1-yard run (pass failed), 3:27. Raiders 31–21. Drive: 7 plays, 74 yards, 2:02.

Fourth quarter

- MONM – Gavin Nelson 24-yard pass from Derek Robertson (Hudson Fiene kick), 14:47. Raiders 31–28. Drive: 10 plays, 80 yards, 2:35.
- MONM – Gavin Nelson 51-yard pass from Derek Robertson (Hudson Fiene kick), 12:24. Hawks 35–31. Drive: 1 play, 51 yards, 0:08.
- MONM – Rodney Nelson 75-yard run (Hudson Fiene kick), 9:32. Hawks 42–31. Drive: 3 plays, 84 yards, 0:39.
- COLG – Danny Shaban 2-yard run (Jake Stearney–Brady Hutchison pass), 4:48. Hawks 42–39. Drive: 13 plays, 85 yards, 4:40.

Statistics	MONM	COLG
First downs	32	27
Total yards	678	541
Rushes–yards	28–187	40–176
Passing yards	491	365
Passing: Comp–Att–Int	34–45–4	21–37–0
Turnovers	4	1
Time of possession	27:03	32:57

Team	Category	Player	Statistics
Monmouth	Passing	Derek Robertson	34/45, 491 yards, 4 TD, 4 INT
Monmouth	Rushing	Rodney Nelson	22 carries, 169 yards, 2 TD
Monmouth	Receiving	Gavin Nelson	5 receptions, 176 yards, 3 TD
Colgate	Passing	Zach Osborne	11/14, 227 yards, 2 TD
Colgate	Rushing	Zach Osborne	10 carries, 59 yards
Colgate	Receiving	Treyvhon Saunders	13 receptions, 223 yards, 2 TD

=== at No. 13 Villanova ===
Colgate Raiders (0–1) at No. 13 Villanova Wildcats (0–0) – Game summary

Quarter	1	2	3	4	Total
Raiders	0	10	7	0	17
No. 13 Wildcats	7	7	10	0	24

at Villanova Stadium • Villanova, PA

- Date: September 6
- Game time: 6:00 PM EDT
- Game weather: Cloudy • Temperature: 75 °F (24 °C) • Wind: NW at 8 miles per hour (13 km/h)
- Game attendance: 4,151
- Referee: Bill McKeever
- TV announcers (FloSports): Sam Kuperman (play-by-play), Steve Pinone (analyst) and Tessa Peloso (sideline)

Game information

First quarter

- VILL – Isaiah Ragland 1-yard run (Jack Barnum kick), 3:33. Wildcats 7–0. Drive: 6 plays, 73 yards, 3:24.

Second quarter

- VILL – Pat McQuiade 28-yard run (Jack Barnum kick), 10:35. Wildcats 14–0. Drive: 4 plays, 37 yards, 1:54.
- COLG – Treyvhon Saunders 32-yard pass from Zach Osborne (Luke Vogeler kick), 7:21. Wildcats 14–7. Drive: 7 plays, 75 yards, 3:14.
- COLG – Luke Vogeler 23-yard field goal, 0:30. Wildcats 14–10. Drive: 11 plays, 71 yards, 5:07.

Third quarter

- VILL – Jack Barnum 39-yard field goal, 5:28. Wildcats 17–10. Drive: 11 plays, 77 yards, 5:48.
- COLG – Winston Moore 24-yard pass from Zach Osborne (Luke Vogeler kick), 2:25. Tied 17–17. Drive: 6 plays, 65 yards, 3:03.
- VILL – Lucas Kopecky 56-yard pass from Pat McQuaide (Jack Barnum kick), 0:52. Wildcats 24–17. Drive: 4 plays, 73 yards, 1:33.

Fourth quarter

- No scoring plays.

Statistics	COLG	VILL
First downs	17	18
Plays–yards	56–350	63–416
Rushes–yards	26–111	35–117
Passing yards	239	299
Passing: Comp–Att–Int	15–30–0	18–28–0
Turnovers	0	0
Time of possession	26:56	33:04

Team	Category	Player	Statistics
Colgate	Passing	Zach Osborne	15/30, 239 yards, 2 TD
Colgate	Rushing	Danny Shaban	8 carries, 50 yards
Colgate	Receiving	Treyvhon Saunders	10 receptions, 137 yards, TD
Villanova	Passing	Pat McQuaide	18/28, 299 yards, TD
Villanova	Rushing	David Avit	15 carries, 49 yards
Villanova	Receiving	Luke Colella	5 receptions, 124 yards

=== at Syracuse (FBS, rivalry) ===
Colgate Raiders (0-2) vs. Syracuse Orange (FBS) (1-1) – Game summary

Quarter	1	2	3	4	Total
Raiders	3	0	14	7	24
Orange (FBS)	14	24	7	21	66

at JMA Wireless Dome • Syracuse, NY

- Date: September 12
- Game time: 7:00 PM EDT
- Game weather: Indoor
- Game attendance: 37,372
- Referee: Rory Bernard
- TV announcers (ACCN): Doug Sherman (play-by-play) and Forrest Conoly (analyst)

Game information

First quarter

- (10:30) SYR – Justus Ross-Simmons 26-yard pass from Steve Angeli, Tripp Woody kick (Drive: 7 plays, 65 yards, 2:29; Syracuse 7–0)
- (5:48) COL – Luke Volger 39-yard field goal (Drive: 6 plays, 20 yards, 2:24; Syracuse 7–3)
- (2:12) SYR – Darrell Gill Jr. 43-yard pass from Steve Angeli, Tripp Woody kick (Drive: 9 plays, 83 yards, 3:32; Syracuse 14–3)

Second quarter

- (14:00) SYR – Will Nixon 2-yard run, Tripp Woody kick (Drive: 5 plays, 36 yards, 2:18; Syracuse 21–3)
- (10:06) SYR – Tripp Woody 22-yard field goal (Drive: 5 plays, 49 yards, 1:16; Syracuse 24–3)
- (6:50) SYR – Darrell Gill Jr. 35-yard pass from Steve Angeli, Tripp Woody kick (Drive: 6 plays, 60 yards, 2:22; Syracuse 31–3)
- (1:43) SYR – Jaylan Hornsby 25-yard pass from Steve Angeli, Tripp Woody kick (Drive: 6 plays, 80 yards, 2:06; Syracuse 38–3)

Third quarter

- (9:13) SYR – Darien Williams 26-yard pass from Steve Angeli, Tripp Woody kick (Drive: 3 plays, 26 yards, 0:14; Syracuse 45–3)
- (4:36) COL – Reed Swanson 12-yard pass from Jake Stearney, Luke Vogeler kick (Drive: 11 plays, 90 yards, 4:31; Syracuse 45–10)
- (0:00) COL – Reed Swanson 23-yard pass from Jake Stearney, Luke Vogeler kick (Drive: 8 plays, 58 yards, 2:58; Syracuse 45–17)

Fourth quarter

- (11:03) SYR – Steve Angeli 1-yard run, Tripp Woody kick (Drive: 9 plays, 71 yards, 3:51; Syracuse 52–17)
- (9:27) COL – Cole Fulton 44-yard run, Luke Vogeler kick (Drive: 5 plays, 75 yards, 1:36; Syracuse 52–24)
- (6:26) SYR – Gabe Daniels 12-yard pass from Rickie Collins, Tripp Woody kick (Drive: 7 plays, 93 yards, 2:52; Syracuse 59–24)
- (4:54) SYR – Luke Carney 9-yard run, Tripp Woody kick (Drive: 2 plays, 13 yards, 0:23; Syracuse 66–24)

Statistics	COLG	SYR
First downs	25	32
Total yards	408	610
Rushing yards	107	173
Passing yards	301	447
Passing: Comp–Att–Int	30–54–2	27–37–1
Time of possession	33:21	26:39

Team	Category	Player	Statistics
Colgate	Passing	Jake Stearney	14/20, 148 yards, 2 TD
Colgate	Rushing	Cole Fulton	7 carries, 72 yards, TD
Colgate	Receiving	Reed Swanson	7 receptions, 110 yards, 2 TD
Syracuse	Passing	Steve Angeli	23/31, 382 yards, 5 TD
Syracuse	Rushing	Will Nixon	12 carries, 66 yards, TD
Syracuse	Receiving	Darrell Gill Jr.	6 receptions, 152 yards, 2 TD

=== Fordham ===
Fordham Rams (0-3) at Colgate Raiders (0-3) – Game summary

Quarter	1	2	3	4	Total
Rams	14	7	0	0	21
Raiders	14	16	7	7	44

at Andy Kerr Stadium • Hamilton, NY

- Date: September 20
- Game time: 1:00 p.m. EDT
- Game weather: Sunny • Temperature: 66 °F (19 °C) • Wind: E at 4 miles per hour (6.4 km/h)
- Game attendance: 2,581
- Referee: Cory Hanson
- TV announcers (ESPN+): Eric Malanoski (play-by-play), Terry Dow (analyst) and Faith Cain (sideline)

Game information

First Quarter

- COLG - Winston Moore 78-yard pass from Zach Osborne (Luke Vogeler kick), 14:09. Raiders 7-0. Drive: 1 play, 78 yards, 0:09.
- FOR - Jabril Carter 39-yard pass from Gunnar Smith (Bennett Henderson kick), 11:20. Tied 7-7. Drive: 8 plays, 75 yards, 2:49.
- COLG - Danny Shaban 4-yard run (Luke Vogeler kick), 8:36. Raiders 14-7. Drive: 8 plays, 84 yards, 2:37.
- FOR- Jack Freeburg 5-yard pass from Gunnar Smith (Bennett Henderson kick), 2:19. Tied 14-14. Drive: 13 plays, 73 yards, 6:09.

Second Quarter

- COLG - Zach Osborne 4-yard run (Two-Point Conversion Failed), 13:48. Raiders 20-14. Drive: 11 plays, 69 yards, 3:22.
- COLG - Luke Vogeler 25-yard Field Goal, 6:56. Raiders 23-14. Drive: 10 plays, 60 yards, 5:28.
- FOR - Jack Freeburg 24-yard pass from Gunnar Smith (Bennett Henderson kick), 3:50. Raiders 23-21. Drive: 8 plays, 65 yards, 3:06.
- COLG - Reed Swanson 13-yard pass from Zach Osborne (Luke Vogeler kick), 2:11. Raiders 30-21. Drive: 5 plays, 75 yards, 1:39.

Third Quarter

- COLG - Jaker Stearney 5-yard run (Luke Vogeler kick), 2:56. Raiders 37-21. Drive: 15 plays, 68 yards, 7:09.

Fourth Quarter

- COLG - Treyvhon Saunders 35-yard pass from Jake Stearney (Luke Vogeler kick), 13:33. Raiders 44-21. Drive: 5 plays, 49 yards, 2:14.

Statistics	FOR	COLG
First downs	19	27
Total yards	307	547
Rushing yards	94	216
Passing yards	213	331
Passing: Comp–Att–Int	24-42-1	22-33-0
Time of possession	26:21	33:39

Team	Category	Player	Statistics
Fordham	Passing	Gunnar Smith	24/42, 213 yards, 3 TD, INT
Fordham	Rushing	Ricky Parks	8 carries, 31 yards
Fordham	Receiving	Jack Freeburg	7 receptions, 57 yards, 2 TD
Colgate	Passing	Zach Osborne	13/16, 219 yards, 2 TD
Colgate	Rushing	Cole Fulton	16 carries, 97 yards
Colgate	Receiving	Winston Moore	4 receptions, 126 yards, TD

=== at Cornell (rivalry) ===
Colgate Raiders (1-3) vs. Cornell Big Red (0-2) – Game summary

Quarter	1	2	3	4	Total
Raiders	14	14	0	13	41
Big Red	0	6	15	0	21

at Schoellkopf Field • Ithaca, NY

- Date: October 4
- Game time: 2:00 p.m. EDT
- TV announcers (ESPN+): Nick DeLuca (play-by-play) and Matt Miller (analyst)

Statistics	COLG	COR
First downs	19	26
Total yards	384	458
Rushing yards	178	233
Passing yards	206	225
Passing: Comp–Att–Int	16-25-0	23-40-4
Time of possession	28:45	31:15

Team	Category	Player	Statistics
Colgate	Passing	Jake Stearney	16/25, 206 yards, 4 TD
Colgate	Rushing	Danny Shaban	11 carries, 91 yards
Colgate	Receiving	Treyvhon Saunders	6 receptions, 91 yards, 2 TD
Cornell	Passing	Garrett Bass-Sulpizio	23/38, 225 yards, TD, 2 INT
Cornell	Rushing	Garrett Bass-Sulpizio	18 carries, 91 yards, TD
Cornell	Receiving	Doryn Smith	7 receptions, 64 yards, TD

=== Richmond ===
Richmond Spiders (3-3) vs. Colgate Raiders (2-3) – Game summary

Quarter	1	2	3	4	Total
Spiders	7	3	0	14	24
Raiders	0	10	0	9	19

at Andy Kerr Stadium • Hamilton, NY

- Date: October 11
- Game time: 1:00 PM EDT
- Game weather: Sunny • Temperature: 61 °F (16 °C) • Wind: S at 7 miles per hour (11 km/h)
- Game attendance: 1,584
- Referee: Alex Parrella
- TV announcers (ESPN+): Eric Malanoski (play-by-play), Terry Dow (analyst) and Faith Cain (sideline)

Game information

First Quarter

- (2:01) RICH - Ashten Snelsire 1-yard run, Jayden Alsheskie kick (Drive: 12 Plays, 80 yards, 7:11; RICH 7–0)

Second Quarter

- (13:51) COLG - Luke Vogeler 38-yard field goal (Drive: 8 Plays, 54 yards, 3:10; RICH 7–3)
- (4:21) COLG - Jake Stearney 13-yard pass to Brady Hutchison, Luke Vogeler kick (Drive: 11 Plays, 92 yards, 5:24; COLG 10–7)
- (0:00) RICH - Jayden Alsheskie 24-yard field goal (Drive: 11 Plays, 71 yards, 4:12; TIED 10–10)

Third Quarter

No scoring plays

Fourth Quarter

- (14:13) COLG - Luke Vogeler 20-yard field goal (Drive: 11 Plays, 56 yards, 5:55; COLG 13–10)
- (14:00) RICH - Ashten Snelsire 75-yard pass to Andreas Hill, Jayden Alsheskie kick (Drive: 1 Play, 75 yards, 0:13; RICH 17–13)
- (9:52) COLG - Jake Stearney 8-yard pass to Reed Swanson, 2-point conversion failed (Drive: 9 Plays, 79 yards, 4:01; COLG 19–17)
- (4:28) RICH - Ja'Vion Griffin 87-yard punt return, Jayden Alsheskie kick (RICH 24–19)

Statistics	RICH	COLG
First downs	15	21
Total yards	296	402
Rushing yards	97	80
Passing yards	199	322
Passing: Comp–Att–Int	13–19–0	25–45–1
Time of possession	26:48	33:12

Team	Category	Player	Statistics
Richmond	Passing	Ashten Snelsire	13/19, 199 yards, TD
Richmond	Rushing	Ashten Snelsire	11 carries, 20 yards, TD
Richmond	Receiving	Andreas Hill	2 receptions, 105 yards, TD
Colgate	Passing	Jake Stearney	25/45, 322 yards, 2 TD
Colgate	Rushing	Danny Shaban	7 carries, 34 yards
Colgate	Receiving	Reed Swanson	7 receptions, 113 yards, TD

=== at Georgetown ===
Colgate Raiders (2-4) vs. Georgetown Hoyas (3-3) – Game summary

Quarter	1	2	3	4	Total
Raiders	7	0	0	10	17
Hoyas	7	0	7	7	21

at Cooper Field • Washington, DC

- Date: October 18
- Game time: 1:00 PM EDT
- Game weather: Sunny • Temperature: 65 °F (18 °C) • Wind: S at 6 miles per hour (9.7 km/h)
- Game attendance: 2,345
- Referee: Bill McKeever
- TV: ESPN+

Statistics	COLG	GTWN
First downs	23	20
Total yards	435	324
Rushing yards	86	121
Passing yards	349	203
Passing: Comp–Att–Int	24-45-2	17-24-0
Time of possession	29:27	30:33

Team	Category	Player	Statistics
Colgate	Passing	Jake Stearney	23/39, 344 yards, TD, INT
Colgate	Rushing	Marco Maldonado	8 carries, 24 yards
Colgate	Receiving	Reed Swanson	11 receptions, 183 yards, TD
Georgetown	Passing	Dez Thomas II	15/21, 165 yards
Georgetown	Rushing	Savion Hart	23 carries, 67 yards, TD
Georgetown	Receiving	Jimmy Kibble	7 receptions, 141 yards

=== at Holy Cross ===
Colgate Raiders (2-5) vs. Holy Cross Crusaders (1-6) – Game summary

Quarter	1	2	3	4	Total
Raiders	7	3	6	13	29
Crusaders	7	7	14	0	28

at Fitton Field • Worcester, MA

- Date: October 25
- Game time: 1:00 p.m. EDT
- Game weather: Sunny • Temperature: 54 °F (12 °C) • Wind: NW at 10 miles per hour (16 km/h)
- Game attendance: 9,724
- Referee: Alexander Randolph
- TV: ESPN+

Statistics	COLG	HC
First downs	23	14
Total yards	320	257
Rushing yards	104	130
Passing yards	216	127
Passing: Comp–Att–Int	23-40-0	15-24-0
Time of possession	33:10	26:50

Team	Category	Player	Statistics
Colgate	Passing	Jake Stearney	23/40, 216 yards, 2 TD
Colgate	Rushing	Danny Shaban	13 carries, 93 yards, TD
Colgate	Receiving	Max Walters	5 receptions, 59 yards
Holy Cross	Passing	Braden Graham	15/24, 127 yards, 2 TD
Holy Cross	Rushing	Jayden Clerveaux	18 carries, 79 yards
Holy Cross	Receiving	Ty Curran	3 receptions, 43 yards

=== Merrimack ===
Merrimack Warriors (3-5) vs. Colgate Raiders (3-5) – Game summary

Quarter	1	2	3	4	OT	Total
Warriors	0	10	7	3	0	20
Raiders	3	7	3	7	3	23

at Andy Kerr Stadium • Hamilton, NY

- Date: November 1
- Game time: 1:00 PM EDT
- Game weather: Cloudy • Temperature: 43 °F (6 °C) • Wind: NW at 12 miles per hour (19 km/h)
- Game attendance: 2,713
- Referee: Tom Zetts
- TV: ESPN+

Statistics	MRMK	COLG
First downs	20	16
Total yards	403	356
Rushing yards	166	110
Passing yards	237	246
Passing: Comp–Att–Int	21–32–2	14–28–1
Time of possession	32:51	27:09

Team	Category	Player	Statistics
Merrimack	Passing	Ayden Pereira	21/31, 237 yards, 2 INT
Merrimack	Rushing	Galamama Mulbah	7 carries, 71 yards
Merrimack	Receiving	Seth Sweitzer	6 receptions, 68 yards
Colgate	Passing	Jake Stearney	14/28, 246 yards, TD, INT
Colgate	Rushing	Danny Shaban	11 carries, 33 yards, TD
Colgate	Receiving	Reed Swanson	5 receptions, 134 yards

=== at Lafayette ===
Colgate Raiders (4-5) vs. Lafayette Leopards (6-3) – Game summary

Quarter	1	2	3	4	Total
Raiders	7	14	7	14	42
Leopards	14	24	7	14	59

at Fisher Stadium • Easton, PA

- Date: November 8
- Game time: 12:30 PM EST
- Game weather: Sunny • Temperature: 61 °F (16 °C) • Wind: E at 7 miles per hour (11 km/h)
- Game attendance: 4,259
- Referee: Alex Parella
- TV: ESPN+

Game information

First Quarter

- (12:46) LAF – Ethan Hosak 3-yard pass from Dean DeNobile, Jack Simonetta kick (Drive: 6 plays, 75 yards, 2:14; Lafayette 7–0)
- (3:50) LAF – Kente Edwards 29-yard run, Jack Simonetta kick (Drive: 7 plays, 88 yards, 3:01; Lafayette 14–0)
- (0:58) COL – Matt Fogler 34-yard pass from Jake Stearney, Luke Vogeler kick (Drive: 6 plays, 65 yards, 2:52; Lafayette 14–7)

Second Quarter

- (14:56) COL – Zach Osborne 2-yard run, Luke Vogeler kick (Drive: 3 plays, 25 yards, 0:56; Tied 14–14)
- (10:37) LAF – Carson Persing 28-yard pass from Dean DeNobile, Jack Simonetta kick (Drive: 9 plays, 75 yards, 4:19; Lafayette 21–14)
- (5:56) COL – Matt Fogler 11-yard pass from Jake Stearney, Luke Vogeler kick (Drive: 10 plays, 75 yards, 4:41; Tied 21–21)
- (3:43) LAF – Zane Wooldridge 39-yard pass from Dean DeNobile, Jack Simonetta kick (Drive: 6 plays, 76 yards, 2:13; Lafayette 28–21)
- (0:41) LAF – Kente Edwards 6-yard run, Jack Simonetta kick (Drive: 5 plays, 26 yards, 1:07; Lafayette 35–21)
- (0:00) LAF – Jack Simonetta 49-yard field goal (Drive: 2 plays, 0 yards, 0:07; Lafayette 38–21)

Third Quarter

- (10:14) COL – Reed Swanson 7-yard pass from Jake Stearney, Luke Vogeler kick (Drive: 4 plays, 21 yards, 1:52; Lafayette 38–28)
- (7:45) LAF – Mason Kuehner 19-yard pass from Dean DeNobile, Jack Simonetta kick (Drive: 5 plays, 52 yards, 2:29; Lafayette 45–28)

Fourth Quarter

- (9:28) LAF – Kente Edwards 49-yard run, Jack Simonetta kick (Drive: 3 plays, 66 yards, 1:32; Lafayette 52–28)
- (5:02) COL – Matt Fogler 18-yard pass from Jackson Kilburg, Luke Vogeler kick (Drive: 9 plays, 75 yards, 4:26; Lafayette 52–35)
- (1:54) LAF – Shaun Purvy 26-yard pass from Daniel Lipovski, Jack Simonetta kick (Drive: 2 plays, 25 yards, 0:45; Lafayette 59–35)
- (0:22) COL – Michael Stevenson 2-yard pass from Jackson Kilburg, Luke Vogeler kick (Drive: 8 plays, 75 yards, 1:32; Lafayette 59–42)

Statistics	COLG	LAF
First downs	28	27
Total yards	436	533
Rushing yards	126	301
Passing yards	310	232
Passing: Comp–Att–Int	33–49–3	19–30–1
Time of possession	31:46	28:14

Team	Category	Player	Statistics
Colgate	Passing	Jake Stearney	22/37, 213 yards, 3 TD, 2 INT
Colgate	Rushing	Danny Shaban	7 carries, 43 yards
Colgate	Receiving	Reed Swanson	9 receptions, 96 yards, TD
Lafayette	Passing	Dean DeNobile	18/29, 206 yards, 4 TD, INT
Lafayette	Rushing	Kente Edwards	20 carries, 260 yards, 3 TD
Lafayette	Receiving	Zane Wooldridge	4 receptions, 70 yards, TD

=== No. 4 Lehigh ===
No. 4 Lehigh Mountain Hawks (10-0) vs. Colgate Raiders (4-6) – Game summary

Quarter	1	2	3	4	Total
No. 4 Mountain Hawks	10	10	0	7	27
Raiders	0	7	0	0	7

at Andy Kerr Stadium • Hamilton, NY

- Date: November 15
- Game time: 1 PM EST
- Game weather: Sunny • Temperature: 40 °F (4 °C) • Wind: S at 6 miles per hour (9.7 km/h)
- Game attendance: 1,227
- Referee: Jeremy DeAngulo

Statistics	LEH	COLG
First downs	16	12
Total yards	393	222
Rushing yards	134	60
Passing yards	259	162
Passing: Comp–Att–Int	17-25-0	17-30-1
Time of possession	37:08	22:52

Team	Category	Player	Statistics
Lehigh	Passing	Hayden Johnson	17/25, 259 yards, TD
Lehigh	Rushing	Jaden Green	9 carries, 54 yards, TD
Lehigh	Receiving	Geoffrey Jamiel	9 receptions, 138 yards, TD
Colgate	Passing	Jake Stearney	15/28, 151 yards, TD, INT
Colgate	Rushing	Zach Osborne	5 carries, 25 yards
Colgate	Receiving	Matt Fogler	3 receptions, 83 yards, TD

=== Bucknell ===
Bucknell Bison (0-0) vs. Colgate Raiders (0-0) – Game summary

Quarter	1	2	3	4	Total
Bison	0	7	0	12	19
Raiders	14	10	7	7	38

at Andy Kerr Stadium • Hamilton, NY

- Date: November 22
- Game time: 1:00 PM EST
- Game weather: Cloudy • Temperature: 37 °F (3 °C) • Wind: NW at 9 miles per hour (14 km/h)
- Game attendance: 1,170
- Referee: Alexander Randolph

Statistics	BUCK	COLG
First downs	15	19
Total yards	241	451
Rushing yards	172	204
Passing yards	69	247
Passing: Comp–Att–Int	8-20-2	14-28-1
Time of possession	29:47	30:13

Team	Category	Player	Statistics
Bucknell	Passing	Nicholas Penuvchev	5/12, 39 yards, TD, 2 INT
Bucknell	Rushing	Michael Cadden	9 carries, 57 yards, TD
Bucknell	Receiving	Josh Gary	3 receptions, 20 yards, TD
Colgate	Passing	Zach Osborne	13/25, 244 yards, 3 TD, INT
Colgate	Rushing	Marco Maldonado	14 carries, 120 yards, TD
Colgate	Receiving	Reed Swanson	6 receptions, 133 yards, TD
