= 2025 Richmond Spiders football team =

American college football season

2025 Richmond Spiders football
- Conference: Patriot League
- Record: 7–5 (3–4 Patriot)
- Head coach: Russ Huesman (9th season)
- Co-offensive coordinators: Jacob Huesman (1st season); Mike Cummings (1st season)
- Defensive coordinator: Justin Wood (6th season)
- Home stadium: E. Claiborne Robins Stadium

2025 Patriot League football standings
	Conf.			Overall
Team	W		L	W		L
No. 10 Lehigh $^	7	–	0	12	–	1
Lafayette	6	–	1	8	–	4
Holy Cross	3	–	4	3	–	9
Richmond	3	–	4	7	–	5
Georgetown	3	–	4	6	–	6
Colgate	3	–	4	5	–	7
Bucknell	2	–	5	5	–	7
Fordham	1	–	6	1	–	11
$ – Conference champion; ^ – FCS playoff participant; Rankings from STATS Poll

The 2025 Richmond Spiders football team represented University of Richmond as a member of the Patriot League during the 2025 NCAA Division I FCS football season. The Spiders were led by ninth-year head coach Russ Huesman and played at the E. Claiborne Robins Stadium in Richmond, Virginia.

== Schedule ==
Date	Time	Opponent	Rank	Site	TV	Result	Attendance
August 30	noon	at No. 14 Lehigh	No. 25	Goodman Stadium; Lower Saucon, PA	ESPN+	L 14–21	4,463
September 6	6:00 p.m.	at Wofford*		Gibbs Stadium; Spartanburg, SC	ESPN+	W 14–10	2,754
September 13	3:30 p.m.	at North Carolina*		Kenan Stadium; Chapel Hill, NC	ACCN	L 6–41	50,500
September 20	2:00 p.m.	VMI*		E. Claiborne Robins Stadium; Richmond, VA (rivalry)	ESPN+/MSN	W 38–14	7,244
September 27	2:00 p.m.	Howard*		E. Claiborne Robins Stadium; Richmond, VA	ESPN+	W 13–12	6,293
October 4	noon	at Bucknell		Christy Mathewson–Memorial Stadium; Lewisburg, PA	ESPN+	L 28–33	1,454
October 11	1:00 p.m.	at Colgate		Crown Field at Andy Kerr Stadium; Hamilton, NY	ESPN+	W 24–19	1,584
October 18	2:00 p.m.	Holy Cross		E. Claiborne Robins Stadium; Richmond, VA	ESPN+/MSN	L 22–28	5,419
November 1	2:00 p.m.	Fordham		E. Claiborne Robins Stadium; Richmond, VA	ESPN+	W 17–14	4,847
November 8	1:00 p.m.	at Georgetown		Cooper Field; Washington, DC	ESPN+	W 31–24	1,349
November 15	2:00 p.m.	Lafayette		E. Claiborne Robins Stadium; Richmond, VA	ESPN+/MASN	L 28–35	5,032
November 22	1:00 p.m.	at William & Mary*		Zable Stadium; Williamsburg, VA (Capital Cup)	FloFootball/MASN	W 28–21	10,894
*Non-conference game; Rankings from STATS Poll released prior to the game; All times are in Eastern time

== Game summaries ==
=== at No. 14 Lehigh ===
No. 25 Richmond Spiders (0–0) at No. 14 Lehigh Mountain Hawks (0–0) – Game summary

Quarter	1	2	3	4	Total
No. 25 Spiders	7	0	7	0	14
No. 14 Mountain Hawks	0	7	7	7	21

at Goodman Stadium • Lower Saucon Township, PA

- Date: August 30
- Game time: Noon EDT
- Game weather: Sunny
- Game attendance: 4,463
- Referee: Cory Hanson
- TV announcers (ESPN+): Marco Socci (play-by-play) and Mike Yadush (analyst)

Game information

First Quarter

- (0:04) RICH - Kyle Wickersham 1-yard run, Will McManus kick (Drive: 5 Plays, 27 yards, 2:49; RICH 7–0)

Second Quarter

- (0:56) LEH - Hayden Johnson 13-yard pass to Jaden Green, Nick Garrido kick (Drive: 6 Plays, 80 yards, 1:26; TIED 7–7)

Third Quarter

- (11:18) LEH - Hayden Johnson 29-yard pass to Geoffrey Jamiel, Nick Garrido kick (Drive: 8 Plays, 75 yards, 3:42; LEH 14–7)
- (11:04) RICH - Isaiah Dawson 99-yard kickoff return, Jayden Alsheskie kick (TIED 14–14)

Fourth Quarter

- (06:29) LEH - Jaden Green 4-yard run, Nick Garrido kick (Drive: 12 Plays, 87 yards, 7:04; LEH 21–14)

Statistics	RICH	LEH
First downs	10	21
Total yards	181	298
Rushing yards	68	163
Passing yards	113	135
Passing: Comp–Att–Int	14–20–1	13–24–2
Time of possession	28:25	31:35

Team	Category	Player	Statistics
Richmond	Passing	Kyle Wickersham	14–20, 113 yards
Richmond	Rushing	Kyle Wickersham	14 carries, 25 yards, 1 TD
Richmond	Receiving	Jaiden Fair	4 receptions, 52 yards
Lehigh	Passing	Hayden Johnson	13–24, 135 yards, 2 TD
Lehigh	Rushing	Jaden Green	13 carries, 88 yards, 1 TD
Lehigh	Receiving	Geoffrey Jamiel	4 receptions, 68 yards, 1 TD

=== at Wofford ===
Richmond Spiders (0–1) at Wofford Terriers (0–1) – Game summary

Quarter	1	2	3	4	Total
Spiders	7	0	0	7	14
Terriers	7	0	3	0	10

at Gibbs Stadium • Greenville, SC

- Date: September 6
- Game time: 6:00 p.m. EDT
- Game weather: Cloudy • Temperature: 76 °F (24 °C) • Wind: W at 6 miles per hour (9.7 km/h)
- Game attendance: 2,754
- Referee: Jason Graham
- TV announcers (ESPN+): Jim Noble (play-by-play), Thom Henson (analyst) and Van Hipp (sideline)

Game information

First Quarter

- (7:12) RICH - Kyle Wickersham 11-yard pass to Andrew King, Jayden Alsheskie kick (Drive: 11 Plays, 90 yards, 4:27; RICH 7–0)
- (0:00) WOF - CJ Coombes 72-yard interception return, Connor Deviney kick (TIED 7–7)

Second Quarter

- No scoring plays

Third Quarter

- (11:03) WOF - Sam Spence 47-yard field goal (Drive: 11 Plays, 46 yards, 3:57; WOF 10–7)

Fourth Quarter

- (14:26) RICH - Kyle Wickersham 10-yard run, Jayden Alsheskie kick (Drive: 9 Plays, 54 yards, 4:43; RICH 14–10)

Statistics	RICH	WOF
First downs	16	13
Total yards	272	158
Rushing yards	119	47
Passing yards	153	111
Passing: Comp–Att–Int	20–29–1	12–25–0
Time of possession	37:07	22:53

Team	Category	Player	Statistics
Richmond	Passing	Kyle Wickersham	20–29, 153 yards, 1 TD
Richmond	Rushing	Kyle Wickersham	17 carries, 78 yards, 1 TD
Richmond	Receiving	Quanye Veney	3 receptions, 42 yards
Wofford	Passing	Ethan Drumm	12–25, 111 yards
Wofford	Rushing	Ihson Jackson-Anderson	7 carries, 45 yards
Wofford	Receiving	Ivory Aikens	6 receptions, 38 yards

=== at North Carolina (FBS) ===
Richmond Spiders (1–1) at North Carolina Tar Heels (FBS) (1–1) – Game summary

Quarter	1	2	3	4	Total
Spiders	0	3	0	3	6
Tar Heels (FBS)	10	10	7	14	41

at Kenan Stadium • Chapel Hill, NC

- Date: September 13
- Game time: 3:30 p.m. EDT
- Game weather: Sunny • Temperature: 81 °F (27 °C) • Wind: NE at 7 miles per hour (11 km/h)
- Game attendance: 50,500
- Referee: John Noli
- TV announcers (ACCN): Chris Cotter (play-by-play), Max Browne (analyst) and Kendra Douglas (sideline)

Game information

First Quarter

- (9:57) UNC - Rece Verhoff 27-yard field goal (Drive: 7 Plays, 58 yards, 2:39; UNC 3–0)
- (3:22) UNC - Gio Lopez 29-yard pass to Jordan Shipp, Rece Verhoff kick (Drive: 8 Plays, 62 yards, 4:05; UNC 10–0)

Second Quarter

- (14:51) UNC - Rece Verhoff 22-yard field goal (Drive: 5 Plays, 21 yards, 1:45; UNC 13–0)
- (10:01) UNC - Gio Lopez 1-yard run, Rece Verhoff kick (Drive: 7 Plays, 36 yards, 2:39; UNC 20–0)
- (1:11) RICH - Jayden Alsheskie 25-yard field goal (Drive: 14 Plays, 76 yards, 8:42; UNC 20–3)

Third Quarter

- (2:06) UNC - Gio Lopez 3-yard pass to Jordan Shipp, Rece Verhoff kick (Drive: 7 Plays, 34 yards, 3:21; UNC 27–3)

Fourth Quarter

- (14:00) UNC - Mikai Gbayor 62-yard fumble recovery, Rece Verhoff kick (UNC 34–3)
- (8:13) UNC - Demon June 45-yard run, Rece Verhoff kick (Drive: 7 Plays, 72 yards, 4:06; UNC 41–3)
- (0:06) RICH - Jayden Alsheskie 28-yard field goal (Drive: 15 Plays, 68 yards, 7:48; UNC 41–6)

Statistics	RICH	UNC
First downs	15	16
Total yards	199	312
Rushing yards	124	193
Passing yards	75	119
Passing: Comp–Att–Int	9–15–1	10–19–1
Time of possession	37:59	22:01

Team	Category	Player	Statistics
Richmond	Passing	Kyle Wickersham	6–8, 47 yards
Richmond	Rushing	Aziz Foster-Powell	12 carries, 38 yards
Richmond	Receiving	Isaiah Dawson	2 receptions, 37 yards
North Carolina	Passing	Gio Lopez	10–18, 119 yards, 2 TD
North Carolina	Rushing	Demon June	14 carries, 148 yards, 1 TD
North Carolina	Receiving	Jordan Shipp	4 receptions, 52 yards, 2 TD

=== VMI (rivalry) ===
VMI Keydets (1–2) at Richmond Spiders (1–2) – Game summary

Quarter	1	2	3	4	Total
Keydets	7	7	0	0	14
Spiders	14	10	7	7	38

at E. Claiborne Robins Stadium • Richmond, VA

- Date: September 20
- Game time: 2:00 p.m. EDT
- Game weather: Sunny • Temperature: 87 °F (31 °C) • Wind: NE at 3 miles per hour (4.8 km/h)
- Game attendance: 7,244
- Referee: Jeremy DeAngulo
- TV announcers (ESPN+/MSN): Bob Black (play-by-play), Chris Anderson (analyst) and Chip Tarkenton (sideline)

Game information

First Quarter

- (10:17) RICH - Aziz Foster-Powell 2-yard run, Jayden Alsheskie kick (Drive: 10 Plays, 75 yards, 4:43; RICH 7–0)
- (10:04) VMI - Collin Shannon 75-yard pass to Owen Sweeney, Ben Shrewsbury kick (Drive: 1 Play, 75 yards, 0:13; TIED 7–7)
- (9:18) RICH - Kyle Wickersham 67-yard pass to Isaiah Dawson, Jayden Alsheskie kick (Drive: 2 Plays, 75 yards, 0:46; RICH 14–7)

Second Quarter

- (6:51) VMI - Collin Shannon 20-yard pass to Owen Sweeney, Ben Shrewsbury kick (Drive: 14 Plays, 80 yards, 6:36; TIED 14–14)
- (3:50) RICH - Kyle Wickersham 13-yard pass to Isaiah Dawson, Jayden Alsheskie kick (Drive: 8 Plays, 75 yards, 3:01; RICH 21–14)
- (1:35) RICH - Jayden Alsheskie 41-yard field goal (Drive: 5 Plays, 14 yards, 0:48; RICH 24–14)

Third Quarter

- (6:17) RICH - Andrew King 83-yard run, Jayden Alsheskie kick (Drive: 4 Plays, 93 yards, 2:35; RICH 31–14)

Fourth Quarter

- (13:51) RICH - Kyle Wickersham 8-yard run, Jayden Alsheskie kick (Drive: 6 Plays, 52 yards, 3:01; RICH 38–14)

Statistics	VMI	RICH
First downs	13	22
Total yards	229	541
Rushing yards	34	353
Passing yards	195	188
Passing: Comp–Att–Int	17–35–1	11–14–0
Time of possession	26:28	33:32

Team	Category	Player	Statistics
VMI	Passing	Collin Shannon	16–34, 198 yards, 2 TD
VMI	Rushing	Leo Boehling	10 carries, 37 yards
VMI	Receiving	Owen Sweeney	4 receptions, 106 yards, 2 TD
Richmond	Passing	Kyle Wickersham	10–13, 166 yards, 2 TD
Richmond	Rushing	Jamaal Brown	14 carries, 153 yards
Richmond	Receiving	Isaiah Dawson	4 receptions, 99 yards, 2 TD

=== Howard ===
Howard Bison (3–1) vs. Richmond Spiders (2–2) – Game summary

Quarter	1	2	3	4	Total
Bison	0	12	0	0	12
Spiders	0	0	0	13	13

at E. Claiborne Robins Stadium • Richmond, VA

- Date: September 27
- Game time: 2:00 p.m. EDT
- Game weather: Rain • Temperature: 75 °F (24 °C) • Wind: E at 4 miles per hour (6.4 km/h)
- Game attendance: 6,293
- Referee: Marc Queen
- TV announcers (ESPN+): Bob Black (play-by-play), Chris Anderson (analyst) and Guerin Austin (sideline)

Game information

First Quarter

No scoring plays

Second Quarter

- (14:16) HOW - Anthony Reagan Jr. 52-yard run, Matt Conord kick (Drive: 3 Plays, 62 yards, 1:08; HOW 7–0)
- (3:14) HOW - 0-yard safety (HOW 9–0)
- (0:23) HOW - Matt Conord 36-yard field goal (Drive: 9 Plays, 45 yards, 2:51; HOW 12–0)

Third Quarter

- No scoring plays

Fourth Quarter

- (11:50) RICH - Isaiah Dawson 42-yard run, Jayden Alsheskie kick (Drive: 1 Play, 42 yards, 0:11; HOW 12–7)
- (10:17) RICH - Ashten Snelsire 7-yard pass to Aziz Foster-Powell, 2-point conversion failed (Drive: 1 Play, 7 yards, 0:06; RICH 13–12)

Statistics	HOW	RICH
First downs	22	10
Total yards	297	152
Rushing yards	213	117
Passing yards	84	35
Passing: Comp–Att–Int	11–24–2	4–17–1
Time of possession	42:09	17:51

Team	Category	Player	Statistics
Howard	Passing	Tyriq Starks	11–24, 84 yards
Howard	Rushing	Anthony Reagan Jr.	20 carries, 129 yards, 1 TD
Howard	Receiving	Breylin Smith	4 receptions, 27 yards
Richmond	Passing	Ashten Snelsire	4–14, 35 yards, 1 TD
Richmond	Rushing	Isaiah Dawson	1 carry, 42 yards, 1 TD
Richmond	Receiving	Jamaal Brown	1 reception, 12 yards

=== at Bucknell ===
Richmond Spiders (3–2) vs. Bucknell Bison (3–2) – Game summary

Quarter	1	2	3	4	Total
Spiders	14	7	7	0	28
Bison	7	10	7	9	33

at Christy Mathewson–Memorial Stadium • Lewisburg, PA

- Date: October 4
- Game time: Noon EDT
- Game weather: Sunny
- Game attendance: 1,454
- Referee: Tom Zetts
- TV announcers (ESPN+): Doug Birdsong (play-by-play) and Charlie Fisher (analyst)

Game information

First Quarter

- (13:10) RICH - Ashten Snelsire 24-yard pass to Isaiah Dawson, Jayden Alsheskie kick (Drive: 4 Plays, 62 yards, 1:43; RICH 7–0)
- (8:19) BUCK - Michael Cadden 4-yard run, Matt Schearer kick (Drive: 9 Plays, 72 yards, 4:45; TIED 7–7)
- (5:41) RICH - Ashten Snelsire 25-yard pass to Isaiah Dawson, Jayden Alsheskie kick (Drive: 6 Plays, 83 yards, 2:31; RICH 14–7)

Second Quarter

- (14:56) BUCK - Logan Bush 11-yard run, Matt Schearer kick (Drive: 11 Plays, 78 yards, 5:40; TIED 14–14)
- (11:42) RICH - Ashten Snelsire 25-yard pass to Andrew King, Jayden Alsheskie kick (Drive: 6 Plays, 69 yards, 3:09; RICH 21–14)
- (0:05) BUCK - Matt Schearer 31-yard field goal (Drive: 10 Plays, 61 yards, 1:23; RICH 21–17)

Third Quarter

- (10:39) BUCK - Michael Cadden 2-yard run, Matt Schearer kick (Drive: 8 Plays, 86 yards, 4:16; BUCK 24–21)
- (8:25) RICH - Ashten Snelsire 25-yard pass to Ja'Vion Griffin, Jayden Alsheskie kick (Drive: 5 Plays, 74 yards, 2:12; RICH 28–24)

Fourth Quarter

- (6:14) BUCK - Matt Schearer 27-yard field goal (Drive: 14 Plays, 80 yards, 5:59; RICH 28–27)
- (2:14) BUCK - Ralph Rucker IV 20-yard pass to Nate Anderson, 2-point conversion failed (Drive: 6 Plays, 49 yards, 1:38; BUCK 33–28)

Statistics	RICH	BUCK
First downs	25	32
Total yards	494	496
Rushing yards	187	212
Passing yards	307	284
Passing: Comp–Att–Int	16–27–3	24–35–0
Time of possession	24:03	35:57

Team	Category	Player	Statistics
Richmond	Passing	Ashten Snelsire	16–27, 307 yards, 4 TD
Richmond	Rushing	Aziz Foster-Powell	8 carries, 108 yards
Richmond	Receiving	Isaiah Dawson	6 receptions, 144 yards, 2 TD
Bucknell	Passing	Ralph Rucker IV	24–34, 284 yards, 1 TD
Bucknell	Rushing	Logan Bush	8 carries, 47 yards, 1 TD
Bucknell	Receiving	Sam Milligan	11 receptions, 133 yards

=== at Colgate ===
Richmond Spiders (3–3) vs. Colgate Raiders (2–3) – Game summary

Quarter	1	2	3	4	Total
Spiders	7	3	0	14	24
Raiders	0	10	0	9	19

at Crown Field at Andy Kerr Stadium • Hamilton, NY

- Date: October 11
- Game time: 1:00 p.m. EDT
- Game weather: Sunny • Temperature: 61 °F (16 °C) • Wind: S at 7 miles per hour (11 km/h)
- Game attendance: 1,584
- Referee: Alex Parrella
- TV announcers (ESPN+): Eric Malanoski (play-by-play), Terry Dow (analyst) and Faith Cain (sideline)

Game information

First Quarter

- (2:01) RICH - Ashten Snelsire 1-yard run, Jayden Alsheskie kick (Drive: 12 Plays, 80 yards, 7:11; RICH 7–0)

Second Quarter

- (13:51) COLG - Luke Vogeler 38-yard field goal (Drive: 8 Plays, 54 yards, 3:10; RICH 7–3)
- (4:21) COLG - Jake Stearney 13-yard pass to Brady Hutchison, Luke Vogeler kick (Drive: 11 Plays, 92 yards, 5:24; COLG 10–7)
- (0:00) RICH - Jayden Alsheskie 24-yard field goal (Drive: 11 Plays, 71 yards, 4:12; TIED 10–10)

Third Quarter

No scoring plays

Fourth Quarter

- (14:13) COLG - Luke Vogeler 20-yard field goal (Drive: 11 Plays, 56 yards, 5:55; COLG 13–10)
- (14:00) RICH - Ashten Snelsire 75-yard pass to Andreas Hill, Jayden Alsheskie kick (Drive: 1 Play, 75 yards, 0:13; RICH 17–13)
- (9:52) COLG - Jake Stearney 8-yard pass to Reed Swanson, 2-point conversion failed (Drive: 9 Plays, 79 yards, 4:01; COLG 19–17)
- (4:28) RICH - Ja'Vion Griffin 87-yard punt return, Jayden Alsheskie kick (RICH 24–19)

Statistics	RICH	COLG
First downs	15	21
Total yards	296	402
Rushing yards	97	80
Passing yards	199	322
Passing: Comp–Att–Int	13–19–0	25–45–1
Time of possession	26:48	33:12

Team	Category	Player	Statistics
Richmond	Passing	Ashten Snelsire	13–19, 199 yards, 1 TD
Richmond	Rushing	Ashten Snelsire	11 carries, 20 yards, 1 TD
Richmond	Receiving	Andreas Hill	2 receptions, 105 yards, 1 TD
Colgate	Passing	Jake Stearney	25–45, 322 yards, 2 TD
Colgate	Rushing	Danny Shaban	7 carries, 34 yards
Colgate	Receiving	Reed Swanson	7 receptions, 113 yards, 1 TD

=== Holy Cross ===
Holy Cross Crusaders (0–6) vs. Richmond Spiders (4–3) – Game summary

Quarter	1	2	3	4	Total
Crusaders	7	7	7	7	28
Spiders	7	3	9	3	22

at E. Claiborne Robins Stadium • Richmond, VA

- Date: October 18
- Game time: 2:00 p.m. EDT
- Game weather: Sunny • Temperature: 73 °F (23 °C) • Wind: N at 6 miles per hour (9.7 km/h)
- Game attendance: 5,419
- Referee: Cody Hanson
- TV announcers (ESPN+/MSN): Bob Black (play-by-play), Jasmonn Coleman (analyst) and Tamara Brown (sideline)

Game information

First Quarter

- (13:29) RICH - Kyle Wickersham 56-yard pass to Andreas Hill, Jayden Alsheskie kick (Drive: 3 Plays, 75 yards, 1:26; RICH 7–0)
- (4:29) HC - Dominic Campanile 4-yard run, Luis Palenzuela kick (Drive: 16 Plays, 75 yards, 9:00; TIED 7–7)

Second Quarter

- (13:14) HC - Nyeoti Punni 1-yard run, Luis Palenzuela kick (Drive: 9 Plays, 45 yards, 3:52; HC 14–7)
- (0:00) RICH - Jayden Alsheskie 41-yard field goal (Drive: 5 Plays, 16 yards, 0:32; HC 14–10)

Third Quarter

- (7:46) RICH - Jayden Alsheskie 28-yard field goal (Drive: 12 Plays, 59 yards, 6:13; HC 14–13)
- (6:59) HC - Jayden Clerveaux 43-yard run, Luis Palenzuela kick (Drive: 1 Play, 43 yards, 0:08; HC 21–13)
- (3:38) RICH - Aziz Foster-Powell 7-yard run, 2-point conversion failed (Drive: 7 Plays, 82 yards, 3:16; HC 21–19)

Fourth Quarter

- (11:38) HC - Joseph Williams 1-yard run, Luis Palenzuela kick (Drive: 12 Plays, 60 yards, 6:53; HC 28–19)
- (5:00) RICH - Jayden Alsheskie 27-yard field goal (Drive: 12 Plays, 65 yards, 6:38; HC 28–22)

Statistics	HC	RICH
First downs	16	19
Total yards	246	373
Rushing yards	155	155
Passing yards	91	218
Passing: Comp–Att–Int	13–25–0	20–32–0
Time of possession	28:57	31:03

Team	Category	Player	Statistics
Holy Cross	Passing	Braden Graham	13–25, 91 yards
Holy Cross	Rushing	Jayden Clerveaux	12 carries, 77 yards, 1 TD
Holy Cross	Receiving	Ty Curran	4 receptions, 39 yards
Richmond	Passing	Kyle Wickersham	20–32, 218 yards, 1 TD
Richmond	Rushing	Kyle Wickersham	17 carries, 80 yards
Richmond	Receiving	Ja'Vion Griffin	6 receptions, 71 yards

=== Fordham ===
Fordham Rams (1–7) vs. Richmond Spiders (4–4) – Game summary

Quarter	1	2	3	4	Total
Rams	7	0	0	7	14
Spiders	7	3	7	0	17

at E. Claiborne Robins Stadium • Richmond, VA

- Date: November 1
- Game time: 2:00 p.m. EDT
- Game weather: Sunny • Temperature: 92 °F (33 °C) • Wind: E at 6 miles per hour (9.7 km/h)
- Game attendance: 4,847
- Referee: Terry Jones
- TV announcers (ESPN+): Bob Black (play-by-play), Chris Anderson (analyst) and Tamara Brown (sideline)

Game information

First Quarter

- (9:52) RICH - Kyle Wickersham 5-yard pass to Ja'Vion Griffin, Jayden Alsheskie kick (Drive: 9 Plays, 75 yards, 5:08; RICH 7–0)
- (5:14) FOR - Gunnar Smith 4-yard pass to Jack Freeburg, Bennett Henderson kick (Drive: 3 Plays, 4 yards, 0:40; TIED 7–7)

Second Quarter

- (14:13) RICH - Jayden Alsheskie 36-yard field goal (Drive: 13 Plays, 56 yards, 6:01; RICH 10–7)

Third Quarter

- (3:47) RICH - Kyle Wickersham 4-yard run, Jayden Alsheskie kick (Drive: 3 Plays, 53 yards, 1:39; RICH 17–7)

Fourth Quarter

- (8:18) FOR - Jack Kaiser 4-yard run, Bennett Henderson kick (Drive: 10 Plays, 70 yards, 4:33; RICH 17–14)

Statistics	FOR	RICH
First downs	12	16
Total yards	161	323
Rushing yards	70	130
Passing yards	91	193
Passing: Comp–Att–Int	19–36–2	23–35–1
Time of possession	27:27	32:33

Team	Category	Player	Statistics
Fordham	Passing	Gunnar Smith	19–36, 91 yards, 1 TD
Fordham	Rushing	Gunnar Smith	14 carries, 41 yards
Fordham	Receiving	Jaden Allen	4 receptions, 30 yards
Richmond	Passing	Kyle Wickersham	23–35, 193 yards, 1 TD
Richmond	Rushing	Aziz Foster-Powell	15 carries, 62 yards
Richmond	Receiving	Isaiah Dawson	7 receptions, 76 yards

=== at Georgetown ===
Richmond Spiders (5–4) vs. Georgetown Hoyas (5–4) – Game summary

Quarter	1	2	3	4	Total
Spiders	3	7	7	14	31
Hoyas	14	0	7	3	24

at Cooper Field • Washington, DC

- Date: November 8
- Game time: 1:00 p.m. EST
- Game weather: Sunny • Temperature: 65 °F (18 °C)
- Game attendance: 1,349
- Referee: Henry Wimberg
- TV announcers (ESPN+): Jeremy Huber (play-by-play) and Christian Taylor (analyst)
- Box score

Game information

First Quarter

- (11:59) RICH - Jayden Alsheskie 34-yard field goal (Drive: 7 Plays, 58 yards, 3:01; RICH 3–0)
- (3:56) GTWN - Savion Hart 2-yard run, Thomas Anderson kick (Drive: 14 Plays, 75 yards, 8:03; GTWN 7–3)
- (1:43) GTWN - Dez Thomas II 17-yard pass to Jimmy Kibble, Thomas Anderson kick (Drive: 3 Plays, 14 yards, 1:57; GTWN 14–3)

Second Quarter

- (14:56) RICH - Aziz Foster-Powell 3-yard run, Jayden Alsheskie kick (Drive: 5 Plays, 68 yards, 1:47; GTWN 14–10)

Third Quarter

- (13:38) GTWN - Savion Hart 60-yard run, Thomas Anderson kick (Drive: 3 Plays, 75 yards, 1:22; GTWN 21–10)
- (4:45) RICH - Ashten Snelsire 1-yard run, Jayden Alsheskie kick (Drive: 7 Plays, 67 yards, 3:03; GTWN 21–17)

Fourth Quarter

- (13:23) RICH - Ashten Snelsire 45-yard pass to Ja'Vion Griffin, Jayden Alsheskie kick (Drive: 6 Plays, 77 yards, 2:22; RICH 24–21)
- (6:43) GTWN - Thomas Anderson 25-yard field goal (Drive: 13 Plays, 72 yards, 6:32; TIED 24–24)
- (2:43) RICH - Ashten Snelsire 15-yard pass to Andrew King, Jayden Alsheskie kick (Drive: 2 Plays, 6 yards, 0:56; RICH 31–24)

Statistics	RICH	GTWN
First downs	13	17
Total yards	338	298
Rushing yards	124	118
Passing yards	214	180
Passing: Comp–Att–Int	17–29–0	16–24–0
Time of possession	21:43	38:17

Team	Category	Player	Statistics
Richmond	Passing	Ashten Snelsire	5–10, 114 yards, 2 TD
Richmond	Rushing	Aziz Foster-Powell	12 carries, 64 yards, 1 TD
Richmond	Receiving	Ja'Vion Griffin	4 receptions, 106 yards, 1 TD
Georgetown	Passing	Dez Thomas II	12–15, 121 yards, 1 TD
Georgetown	Rushing	Savion Hart	21 carries, 128 yards, 2 TD
Georgetown	Receiving	Jimmy Kibble	9 receptions, 97 yards, 1 TD

=== Lafayette ===
Lafayette Leopards (7–3) vs. Richmond Spiders (6–4) – Game summary

Quarter	1	2	3	4	Total
Leopards	7	7	14	7	35
Spiders	0	7	7	14	28

at E. Claiborne Robins Stadium • Richmond, VA

- Date: November 15
- Game time: 2:00 p.m. EST
- Game weather: Cloudy • Temperature: 71 °F (22 °C) • Wind: SW at 6 miles per hour (9.7 km/h)
- Game attendance: 5,032
- Referee: Jeff Pumphrey
- TV announcers (ESPN+/MASN): Bob Black (play-by-play), Chris Anderson (analyst) and Guerin Austin (sideline)
- Box score

Game information

First Quarter

- (4:16) LAF - Dean DeNobile 17-yard pass to Carson Persing, Jack Simonetta kick (Drive: 9 Plays, 74 yards, 4:38; LAF 7–0)

Second Quarter

- (12:56) RICH - Kyle Wickersham 1-yard run, Jayden Alsheskie kick (Drive: 12 Plays, 71 yards, 6:20; TIED 7–7)
- (10:20) LAF - Dean DeNobile 26-yard pass to Nick Bierman, Jack Simonetta kick (Drive: 6 Plays, 83 yards, 2:36; LAF 14–7)

Third Quarter

- (12:44) LAF - Dean DeNobile 21-yard pass to Nick Bierman, Jack Simonetta kick (Drive: 5 Plays, 75 yards, 2:16; LAF 21–7)
- (2:56) RICH - Kyle Wickersham 32-yard pass to Ja'Vion Griffin, Jayden Alsheskie kick (Drive: 9 Plays, 72 yards, 4:34; LAF 21–14)
- (2:15) LAF - Kente Edwards 61-yard run, Jack Simonetta kick (Drive: 2 Plays, 65 yards, 0:41; LAF 28–14)

Fourth Quarter

- (6:50) RICH - Aziz Foster-Powell 12-yard run, Jayden Alsheskie kick (Drive: 2 Plays, 23 yards, 0:26; LAF 28–21)
- (6:09) LAF - Kente Edwards 70-yard run, Jack Simonetta kick (Drive: 2 Plays, 75 yards, 0:41; LAF 35–21)
- (1:18) RICH - Kyle Wickersham 5-yard pass to Andreas Hill, Jayden Alsheskie kick (Drive: 19 Plays, 82 yards, 4:51; LAF 35–28)

Statistics	LAF	RICH
First downs	18	27
Total yards	419	480
Rushing yards	254	147
Passing yards	165	333
Passing: Comp–Att–Int	14–22–1	33–64–1
Time of possession	23:31	36:29

Team	Category	Player	Statistics
Lafayette	Passing	Dean DeNobile	14/21, 165 yards, 3 TD
Lafayette	Rushing	Kente Edwards	26 carries, 265 yards, 2 TD
Lafayette	Receiving	Carson Persing	6 receptions, 93 yards, TD
Richmond	Passing	Kyle Wickersham	20/35, 234 yards, 2 TD
Richmond	Rushing	Aziz Foster-Powell	12 carries, 70 yards, TD
Richmond	Receiving	Ja'Vion Griffin	10 receptions, 113 yards, TD

=== at William & Mary (Capital Cup) ===
Richmond Spiders (6–5) vs. William & Mary Tribe (7–4) – Game summary

Quarter	1	2	3	4	Total
Spiders	0	0	21	7	28
Tribe	7	7	0	7	21

at Zable Stadium • Williamsburg, VA

- Date: November 22
- Game time: 1:00 p.m. EST
- Game weather: Rain • Temperature: 64 °F (18 °C)
- Game attendance: 10,894
- Referee: Justin Ackley
- TV announcers (FloSports/MASN): Jay Colley (play-by-play) and Shawn Knight (analyst)
- Box score

Game information

First Quarter

- (11:27) W&M - Tyler Hughes 3-yard run, Keegan Shackford kick (Drive: 6 Plays, 47 yards, 2:00; W&M 7–0)

Second Quarter

- (9:33) W&M - Rashad Raymond 3-yard run, Keegan Shackford kick (Drive: 6 Plays, 52 yards, 3:16; W&M 14–0)

Third Quarter

- (10:01) RICH - Kyle Wickersham 11-yard pass to Ja'Vion Griffin, Jayden Alsheskie kick (Drive: 10 Plays, 55 yards, 4:59; W&M 14–7)
- (4:57) RICH - Kyle Wickersham 6-yard pass to Quanye Veney, Jayden Alsheskie kick (Drive: 9 Plays, 70 yards, 4:02; TIED 14–14)
- (2:14) RICH - Kyle Wickersham 15-yard run, Jayden Alsheskie kick (Drive: 2 Plays, 40 yards, 0:42; RICH 21–14)

Fourth Quarter

- (11:11) W&M - Tyler Hughes 7-yard run, Keegan Shackford kick (Drive: 6 Plays, 69 yards, 2:47; TIED 21–21)
- (1:56) RICH - Ashten Snelsire 14-yard run, Jayden Alsheskie kick (Drive: 13 Plays, 91 yards, 6:19; RICH 28–21)

Statistics	RICH	W&M
First downs	18	12
Total yards	323	194
Rushing yards	151	108
Passing yards	172	86
Passing: Comp–Att–Int	15–24–0	15–24–1
Time of possession	31:21	28:39

Team	Category	Player	Statistics
Richmond	Passing	Kyle Wickersham	12–18, 128 yards, 2 TD
Richmond	Rushing	Kyle Wickersham	16 carries, 73 yards, 1 TD
Richmond	Receiving	Ja'Vion Griffin	9 receptions, 93 yards, 1 TD
William & Mary	Passing	Tyler Hughes	15–24, 86 yards
William & Mary	Rushing	Rashad Raymond	13 carries, 58 yards, 1 TD
William & Mary	Receiving	Isaiah Lemmond	3 receptions, 30 yards

== Ranking movements ==
Ranking movements Legend: ██ Increase in ranking ██ Decrease in ranking — = Not ranked RV = Received votes т = Tied with team above or below
	Week														
Poll	Pre	1	2	3	4	5	6	7	8	9	10	11	12	13	Final
STATS FCS	25	RV	RV	RV	RV	RV	—	—	—	—	—	—	—	—	
Coaches	22т	RV	RV	RV	RV	RV	—	—	—	—	—	—	—	RV	
