= 2025 Georgetown Hoyas football team =

American college football season

2025 Georgetown Hoyas football
- Conference: Patriot League
- Record: 6–6 (3–4 Patriot)
- Head coach: Rob Sgarlata (11th season)
- Offensive coordinator: Rob Spence (7th season)
- Offensive scheme: Multiple
- Defensive coordinator: Kevin Doherty (8th season)
- Base defense: 3–4
- Home stadium: Cooper Field

2025 Patriot League football standings
	Conf.			Overall
Team	W		L	W		L
No. 10 Lehigh $^	7	–	0	12	–	1
Lafayette	6	–	1	8	–	4
Holy Cross	3	–	4	3	–	9
Richmond	3	–	4	7	–	5
Georgetown	3	–	4	6	–	6
Colgate	3	–	4	5	–	7
Bucknell	2	–	5	5	–	7
Fordham	1	–	6	1	–	11
$ – Conference champion; ^ – FCS playoff participant; Rankings from STATS Poll

The 2025 Georgetown Hoyas football team represented Georgetown University as a member of the Patriot League in the 2025 NCAA Division I FCS football season. Being led by eleventh-year head coach Rob Sgarlata, the Hoyas play their home games at Cooper Field in Washington, D.C..

== Schedule ==
Date	Time	Opponent	Site	TV	Result	Attendance
August 30	1:00 p.m.	at Davidson*	Davidson College Stadium; Davidson, NC	ESPN+	W 51–14	3,291
September 6	1:00 p.m.	Wagner*	Cooper Field; Washington, DC	ESPN+	W 31–20	1,276
September 13	1:00 p.m.	Lafayette	Cooper Field; Washington, DC	ESPN+	L 37–42	1,131
September 20	12:00 p.m.	at Brown*	Brown Stadium; Providence, RI	ESPN+	L 0–48	3,349
September 27	12:00 p.m.	at Columbia*	Wien Stadium; New York, NY	ESPN+	L 10–19	3,909
October 4	1:00 p.m.	Morgan State*^{†}	Cooper Field; Washington, DC	ESPN+	W 27–24	1,337
October 18	1:00 p.m.	Colgate	Cooper Field; Washington, DC	ESPN+	W 21–17	2,345
October 25	12:00 p.m.	at Bucknell	Christy Mathewson-Memorial Stadium; Lewisburg, PA	ESPN+	W 31–24	778
November 1	12:00 p.m.	at No. 7 Lehigh	Goodman Stadium; Lower Saucon Township, PA	ESPN+	L 0–41	4,478
November 8	1:00 p.m.	Richmond	Cooper Field; Washington, DC	ESPN+	L 24–31	1,349
November 15	1:00 p.m.	Fordham	Cooper Field; Washington, DC	ESPN+	W 14–0	1,596
November 22	1:00 p.m.	vs. Holy Cross	Fenway Park; Boston, MA	ESPN+	L 7–42	13,674
*Non-conference game; ^{†}Homecoming; Rankings from STATS Poll released prior to the game; All times are in Eastern time

== Game summaries ==
=== at Davidson ===
Georgetown Hoyas (0-0) at Davidson Wildcats (0-0) – Game summary

Quarter	1	2	3	4	Total
Hoyas	20	18	7	6	51
Wildcats	7	7	0	0	14

at Davidson College Stadium • Davidson, NC

- Date: August 30
- Game time: 1:00 PM EDT
- Game weather: Sunny • Temperature: 79 °F (26 °C) • Wind: NE at 4 miles per hour (6.4 km/h)
- Game attendance: 3,291
- Referee: Charles Olson
- TV announcers (ESPN+): Paul Roper (play-by-play) and Mike Fresina (analyst)

Game information

First quarter

- GTWN – Savion Hart 69-yard run (Thomas Anderson kick), 14:20. Hoyas 7–0. Drive: 2 plays, 78 yards, 0:33.
- GTWN – Savion Hart 27-yard run (Thomas Anderson kick), 3:30. Hoyas 14–0. Drive: 8 plays, 65 yards, 3:43.
- DAV – Brody Reina 55-yard pass from Coulter Cleland (Christos Tzoumakas kick), 1:11. Hoyas 14–7. Drive: 5 plays, 65 yards, 2:19.
- GTWN – Savion Hart 73-yard pass from Dez Thomas II (Thomas Anderson kick failed), 0:24. Hoyas 20–7. Drive: 2 plays, 75 yards, 0:47.

Second quarter

- GTWN – Jimmy Kibble 41-yard pass from Danny Lauter (Thomas Anderson kick), 11:45. Hoyas 27–7. Drive: 6 plays, 84 yards, 2:20.
- GTWN – Bryce Cox 3-yard run (Dez Thomas II–Isaiah Grimes pass), 3:52. Hoyas 35–7. Drive: 13 plays, 76 yards, 5:35.
- GTWN – Thomas Anderson 41-yard field goal, 1:14. Hoyas 38–7. Drive: 4 plays, 2 yards, 2:23.
- DAV – Coulter Cleland 12-yard run (Christos Tzoumakas kick), 0:14. Hoyas 38–14. Drive: 9 plays, 75 yards, 1:00.

Third quarter

- GTWN – Nicholas Dunneman 7-yard pass from Danny Lauter (Thomas Anderson kick), 8:36. Hoyas 45–14. Drive: 8 plays, 58 yards, 3:03.

Fourth quarter

- GTWN – Jayden Sumpter 4-yard run (Thomas Anderson kick failed), 14:56. Hoyas 51–14. Drive: 10 plays, 75 yards, 4:31.

Statistics	GTWN	DAV
First downs	23	18
Total yards	543	329
Rushes–yards	40–282	38–139
Passing yards	261	190
Passing: Comp–Att–Int	17–23–0	19–31–1
Turnovers	0	2
Time of possession	30:40	29:20

Team	Category	Player	Statistics
Georgetown	Passing	Danny Lauter	11/16, 135 yards, 2 TD
Georgetown	Rushing	Savion Hart	8 carries, 123 yards, 2 TD
Georgetown	Receiving	Savion Hart	2 receptions, 78 yards, TD
Davidson	Passing	Coulter Cleland	12/17, 128 yards, TD, INT
Davidson	Rushing	Coulter Cleland	8 carries, 57 yards, TD
Davidson	Receiving	Brody Reina	1 reception, 55 yards, TD

=== Wagner ===
Wagner Seahawks (0-1) vs. Georgetown Hoyas (1-0) – Game summary

Quarter	1	2	3	4	Total
Seahawks	-	-	-	-	0
Hoyas	-	-	-	-	0

at Cooper Field • Washington, DC

- Date: September 6
- Game time: 1:00 PM EDT
- TV announcers (ESPN+): Jeremy Huber (play-by-play) and Derwin Gray (analyst)

Statistics	WAG	GTWN
First downs		
Total yards		
Rushing yards		
Passing yards		
Passing: Comp–Att–Int		
Time of possession		

Team	Category	Player	Statistics
Wagner	Passing		
Wagner	Rushing		
Wagner	Receiving		
Georgetown	Passing	Danny Lauter	14/24, 164 yards, 1TD
Georgetown	Rushing		
Georgetown	Receiving		

=== Lafayette ===
Lafayette Leopards (1-1) vs. Georgetown Hoyas (2-0) – Game summary

Quarter	1	2	3	4	Total
Leopards	-	-	-	-	0
Hoyas	-	-	-	-	0

at Cooper Field • Washington, DC

- Date: September 13
- Game time: 1:00 PM EDT
- TV announcers (ESPN+): Jeremy Huber (play-by-play) and Christian Taylor (analyst)

Statistics	LAF	GTWN
First downs		
Total yards		
Rushing yards		
Passing yards		
Passing: Comp–Att–Int		
Time of possession		

Team	Category	Player	Statistics
Lafayette	Passing		
Lafayette	Rushing		
Lafayette	Receiving		
Georgetown	Passing	Danny Lauter	27/45, 319 yards, 2 TD
Georgetown	Rushing		
Georgetown	Receiving		

=== at Brown ===
Georgetown Hoyas (2-1) vs. Brown Bears (0-0) – Game summary

Quarter	1	2	3	4	Total
Hoyas	0	0	0	0	0
Bears	14	18	7	7	46

at Brown Stadium • Providence, RI

- Date: September 20
- Game time: 1:00 PM EDT
- Game weather: Sunny • Temperature: 69 °F (21 °C)
- Game attendance: 3,349
- Referee: Anthony Florio
- TV announcers (ESPN+): Scott Cordischi (play-by-play), Nick Coit (analyst) and Cam Manna (sideline)

Game information

First Quarter

- BRWN – Qwentin Brown 1-yard run (Drew Crabtree kick), 11:51. Bears 7–0. Drive: 8 plays, 75 yards, 3:09.
- BRWN – Jackson Bennett 9-yard run (Drew Crabtree kick), 1:22. Bears 14–0. Drive: 6 plays, 44 yards, 2:06.

Second Quarter

- BRWN – Drew Crabtree 24-yard field goal, 7:12. Bears 17–0. Drive: 7 plays, 56 yards, 2:47.
- BRWN – Matt Childs 4-yard pass from James Murphy (Drew Crabtree kick), 6:20. Bears 24–0. Drive: 3 plays, 6 yards, 0:41.
- BRWN – Qwentin Brown 49-yard run (James Murphy pass to Ty Pezza), 3:06. Bears 32–0. Drive: 3 plays, 65 yards, 1:18.

Third Quarter

- BRWN – Levi Linowes 42-yard pass from James Murphy (Drew Crabtree kick), 3:05. Bears 39–0. Drive: 5 plays, 80 yards, 2:26.

Fourth Quarter

- BRWN – Eli Jones 1-yard run (Drew Crabtree kick), 11:24. Bears 46–0. Drive: 6 plays, 21 yards, 3:36.

Statistics	GTWN	BRWN
First downs	11	18
Total yards	183	387
Rushing yards	76	168
Passing yards	107	219
Passing: Comp–Att–Int	9–29–2	20–28–1
Time of possession	29:27	30:33

Team	Category	Player	Statistics
Georgetown	Passing	Dez Thomas II	7/24, 94 yards, 2 INT
Georgetown	Rushing	Savion Hart	10 carries, 42 yards
Georgetown	Receiving	Jimmy Kibble	3 receptions, 82 yards
Brown	Passing	James Murphy	20/28, 219 yards, 2 TD, INT
Brown	Rushing	Qwentin Brown	9 carries, 69 yards, 2 TD
Brown	Receiving	Levi Linowes	2 receptions, 56 yards, TD

=== at Columbia ===
Georgetown Hoyas (2-2) vs. Columbia Lions (0-1) – Game summary

Quarter	1	2	3	4	Total
Hoyas	0	3	7	0	10
Lions	7	9	0	3	19

at Wien Stadium • New York City, NY

- Date: September 27
- Game time: 1:00 PM EDT
- Game weather: Sunny • Temperature: 75 °F (24 °C) • Wind: NE at 5 miles per hour (8.0 km/h)
- Game attendance: 3,909
- Referee: Todd Bowman
- TV announcers (ESPN+): Lance Medow (play-by-play) and Shawn Fitzgerald (analyst)

Game information

First quarter

- (2:53) COLU – Hutch Crow 4-yard pass from Chase Goodwin, Hugo Merry kick (Drive: 11 plays, 92 yards, 4:11; Columbia 7-0)

Second quarter

- (12:14) COLU – Chase Goodwin 1-yard run, Hugo Merry PAT failed (Drive: 11 plays, 92 yards, 4:11; Columbia 13-0)
- (3:18) GTWN – Thomas Anderson 45-yard field goal (Drive: 10 plays, 34 yards, 4:26; Columbia 13-3)
- (0:00) COLU – Hugo Merry 25-yard field goal (Drive: 11 plays, 53 yards, 3:08; Columbia 16-3)

Third quarter

- (5:34) GTWN – Jayden Sumpter 21-yard run, Thomas Anderson kick (Drive: 15 plays, 80 yards, 5:57; Columbia 16-10)

Fourth quarter

- (3:22) COLU – Hugo Merry 20-yard field goal (Drive: 6 plays, 17 yards, 3:44; Columbia 19-10)

Statistics	GTWN	COLU
First downs	13	17
Total yards	211	293
Rushing yards	144	136
Passing yards	67	157
Passing: Comp–Att–Int	9–24–3	13–27–1
Time of possession	29:12	30:48

Team	Category	Player	Statistics
Georgetown	Passing	Dex Thomas II	9/24, 67 yards, 3 INT
Georgetown	Rushing	Jayden Sumpter	25 carries, 92 yards, TD
Georgetown	Receiving	Jimmy Kibble	4 receptions, 37 yards
Columbia	Passing	Chase Goodwin	11/24, 151 yards, TD, INT
Columbia	Rushing	Michael Walters	16 carries, 48 yards
Columbia	Receiving	Titus Evans	3 receptions, 52 yards

=== Morgan State ===
Morgan State Bears (2-3) vs. Georgetown Hoyas (2-3) – Game summary

Quarter	1	2	3	4	Total
Bears	0	7	17	0	24
Hoyas	14	0	7	6	27

at Cooper Field • Washington, DC

- Date: October 4
- Game time: 1:00 PM EDT
- Game weather: Sunny • Temperature: 75 °F (24 °C)
- Game attendance: 1,337
- Referee: Alexander Randolph
- TV announcers (ESPN+): Jeremy Huber (play-by-play) and Christian Taylor (analyst)

Game information

First Quarter

- (8:26) GTWN – Isaiah Grimes 2-yard pass from Dez Thomas II, Thomas Anderson kick (Drive: 12 plays, 75 yards, 6:34; Georgetown 7–0)
- (1:33) GTWN – Coen Sutton 10-yard pass from Dez Thomas II, Thomas Anderson kick (Drive: 10 plays, 62 yards, 5:04; Georgetown 14–0)

Second Quarter

- (1:24) MORG – Joshua Smith 1-yard pass from Kobe Muasau, Sahr Gbundema kick (Drive: 9 plays, 59 yards, 4:04; Georgetown 14–7)

Third Quarter

- (13:48) MORG – Malique Leatherbury 64-yard pass from Kobe Muasau, Sahr Gbundema kick (Drive: 2 plays, 59 yards, 1:04; Tied 14–14)
- (10:48) GTWN – Dez Thomas II 12-yard run, Thomas Anderson kick (Drive: 7 plays, 75 yards, 2:39; Georgetown 21–14)
- (6:13) MORG – Sahr Gbundema 32-yard field goal (Drive: 10 plays, 71 yards, 4:29; Georgetown 21–17)
- (0:20) MORG – Justin Perry 28-yard pass from Dante Archie, Sahr Gbundema kick (Drive: 11 plays, 98 yards, 4:23; Morgan State 24–21)

Fourth Quarter

- (0:00) GTWN – Jimmy Kibble 49-yard pass from Dez Thomas II (Drive: 6 plays, 65 yards, 0:32; Georgetown 27–24)

Statistics	MORG	GTWN
First downs	12	25
Total yards	341	411
Rushing yards	46	200
Passing yards	295	211
Passing: Comp–Att–Int	22–33–0	16–30–0
Time of possession	26:38	33:06

Team	Category	Player	Statistics
Morgan State	Passing	Kobe Muasau	21/32, 267 yards, 2 TD
Morgan State	Rushing	Keith Jenkins Jr.	8 carries, 24 yards
Morgan State	Receiving	Justin Perry	5 receptions, 127 yards, TD
Georgetown	Passing	Dez Thomas II	16/30, 211 yards, 3 TD
Georgetown	Rushing	Dez Thomas II	13 carries, 71 yards, TD
Georgetown	Receiving	Jimmy Kibble	5 receptions, 110 yards, TD

=== Colgate ===
Colgate Raiders (2-4) vs. Georgetown Hoyas (3-3) – Game summary

Quarter	1	2	3	4	Total
Raiders	-	-	-	-	0
Hoyas	-	-	-	-	0

at Cooper Field • Washington, DC

- Date: October 18
- Game time: 1:00 PM EDT
- TV: ESPN+

Statistics	COLG	GTWN
First downs		
Total yards		
Rushing yards		
Passing yards		
Passing: Comp–Att–Int		
Time of possession		

Team	Category	Player	Statistics
Colgate	Passing		
Colgate	Rushing		
Colgate	Receiving		
Georgetown	Passing		
Georgetown	Rushing		
Georgetown	Receiving		

=== at Bucknell ===
Georgetown Hoyas (4-3) vs. Bucknell Bison (4-4) – Game summary

Quarter	1	2	3	4	Total
Hoyas	-	-	-	-	0
Bison	-	-	-	-	0

at Christy Mathewson–Memorial Stadium • Lewisburg, PA

- Date: October 25
- Game time: 12:00 PM EDT
- TV announcers (ESPN+): Doug Birdsong (play-by-play) and Charle Fisher (analyst)

Statistics	GTWN	BUCK
First downs		
Total yards		
Rushing yards		
Passing yards		
Passing: Comp–Att–Int		
Time of possession		

Team	Category	Player	Statistics
Georgetown	Passing		
Georgetown	Rushing		
Georgetown	Receiving		
Bucknell	Passing		
Bucknell	Rushing		
Bucknell	Receiving		

=== at No. 7 Lehigh ===
Georgetown Hoyas (5-3) vs. No. 7 Lehigh Mountain Hawks (8-0) – Game summary

Quarter	1	2	3	4	Total
Hoyas	0	0	0	0	0
No. 7 Mountain Hawks	7	13	7	14	41

at Goodman Stadium • Lower Saucon Township, PA

- Date: November 1
- Game time: 1:00 PM EDT
- Game weather: Sunny
- Game attendance: 4,478
- Referee: Alexander Randolph
- TV announcers (ESPN+): Marco Socci (play-by-play) and Lance Haynes (analyst)

Game information

First Quarter

- (9:33) LEH – Jaden Green 15-yard run, Nick Garrido kick (Drive: 10 plays, 58 yards, 4:26; Lehigh 7–0)

Second Quarter

- (10:46) LEH – Luke Yoder 6-yard run, Nick Garrido kick (Drive: 9 plays, 75 yards, 5:03; Lehigh 14–0)
- (7:01) LEH – Luke Yoder 41-yard run (Drive: 1 play, 41 yards, 0:07; Lehigh 20–0)

Third Quarter

- (10:10) LEH – Aidan Singleton 26-yard interception, Connor Poole kick (Lehigh 27–0)

Fourth Quarter

- (12:53) LEH – Geoffrey Jamiel 27-yard pass from Hayden Johnson, Connor Poole kick (Drive: 3 plays, 47 yards, 1:23; Lehigh 34–0)
- (4:21) LEH – Derek Morgan 9-yard run, Canaan Kimball kick (Drive: 10 plays, 67 yards, 6:40; Lehigh 41–0)

Statistics	GTWN	LEH
First downs	13	20
Total yards	271	371
Rushing yards	90	193
Passing yards	181	178
Passing: Comp–Att–Int	18–32–1	14–21–0
Time of possession	32:03	27:57

Team	Category	Player	Statistics
Georgetown	Passing	Dez Thomas II	14/25, 168 yards, INT
Georgetown	Rushing	Dez Thomas II	14 carries, 11 yards
Georgetown	Receiving	Jimmy Kibble	5 receptions, 99 yards
Lehigh	Passing	Hayden Johnson	14/21, 178 yards, TD
Lehigh	Rushing	Luke Yoder	8 carries, 62 yards, 2 TD
Lehigh	Receiving	Geoffrey Jamiel	5 receptions, 72 yards, TD

=== Richmond ===
Richmond Spiders (5-4) vs. Georgetown Hoyas (5-4) – Game summary

Quarter	1	2	3	4	Total
Spiders	3	7	7	14	31
Hoyas	14	0	7	3	24

at Cooper Field • Washington, DC

- Date: November 8
- Game time: 1:00 PM EST
- Game weather: Sunny
- Game attendance: 1,349
- Referee: Henry Wimberg
- TV announcers (ESPN+): Jeremy Huber (play-by-play) and Christian Taylor (analyst)

Game information

First Quarter

- (11:59) RICH - Jayden Alsheskie 34-yard field goal (Drive: 7 Plays, 58 yards, 3:01; RICH 3–0)
- (3:56) GTWN - Savion Hart 2-yard run, Thomas Anderson kick (Drive: 14 Plays, 75 yards, 8:03; GTWN 7–3)
- (1:43) GTWN - Dez Thomas II 17-yard pass to Jimmy Kibble, Thomas Anderson kick (Drive: 3 Plays, 14 yards, 1:57; GTWN 14–3)

Second Quarter

- (14:56) RICH - Aziz Foster-Powell 3-yard run, Jayden Alsheskie kick (Drive: 5 Plays, 68 yards, 1:47; GTWN 14–10)

Third Quarter

- (13:38) GTWN - Savion Hart 60-yard run, Thomas Anderson kick (Drive: 3 Plays, 75 yards, 1:22; GTWN 21–10)
- (4:45) RICH - Ashten Snelsire 1-yard run, Jayden Alsheskie kick (Drive: 7 Plays, 67 yards, 3:03; GTWN 21–17)

Fourth Quarter

- (13:23) RICH - Ashten Snelsire 45-yard pass to Ja'Vion Griffin, Jayden Alsheskie kick (Drive: 6 Plays, 77 yards, 2:22; RICH 24–21)
- (6:43) GTWN - Thomas Anderson 25-yard field goal (Drive: 13 Plays, 72 yards, 6:32; TIED 24–24)
- (2:43) RICH - Ashten Snelsire 15-yard pass to Andrew King, Jayden Alsheskie kick (Drive: 2 Plays, 6 yards, 0:56; RICH 31–24)

Statistics	RICH	GTWN
First downs	13	17
Total yards	338	298
Rushing yards	124	118
Passing yards	214	180
Passing: Comp–Att–Int	17–29–0	16–24–0
Time of possession	21:43	38:17

Team	Category	Player	Statistics
Richmond	Passing	Ashten Snelsire	5/10, 114 yards, 2 TD
Richmond	Rushing	Aziz Foster-Powell	12 carries, 64 yards, TD
Richmond	Receiving	Ja'Vion Griffin	4 receptions, 106 yards, TD
Georgetown	Passing	Dez Thomas II	12/15, 121 yards, TD
Georgetown	Rushing	Savion Hart	21 carries, 128 yards, 2 TD
Georgetown	Receiving	Jimmy Kibble	9 receptions, 97 yards, TD

=== Fordham ===
Fordham Rams (1-9) vs. Georgetown Hoyas (5-5) – Game summary

Quarter	1	2	3	4	Total
Rams	-	-	-	-	0
Hoyas	-	-	-	-	0

at Cooper Field • Washington, DC

- Date: November 15
- Game time: 1:00 PM EST
- TV: ESPN+

Statistics	FOR	GTWN
First downs		
Total yards		
Rushing yards		
Passing yards		
Passing: Comp–Att–Int		
Time of possession		

Team	Category	Player	Statistics
Fordham	Passing		
Fordham	Rushing		
Fordham	Receiving		
Georgetown	Passing		
Georgetown	Rushing		
Georgetown	Receiving		

=== vs. Holy Cross ===
Georgetown Hoyas (0-0) vs. Holy Cross Crusaders (0-0) – Game summary

Quarter	1	2	3	4	Total
Hoyas	-	-	-	-	0
Crusaders	-	-	-	-	0

at Fenway Park • Boston, MA

- Date: November 22
- Game time: 1:00 PM EST

Statistics	GTWN	HC
First downs		
Total yards		
Rushing yards		
Passing yards		
Passing: Comp–Att–Int		
Time of possession		

Team	Category	Player	Statistics
Georgetown	Passing		
Georgetown	Rushing		
Georgetown	Receiving		
Holy Cross	Passing		
Holy Cross	Rushing		
Holy Cross	Receiving		
