= 2025 Lafayette Leopards football team =

American college football season

2025 Lafayette Leopards football
- Conference: Patriot League

Ranking
- FCS Coaches: No. 25
- Record: 8–4 (6–1 Patriot)
- Head coach: John Troxell (4th season)
- Offensive coordinator: T. J. Dimuzio (4th season)
- Defensive coordinator: Mike Saint Germain (4th season)
- Home stadium: Fisher Stadium

2025 Patriot League football standings
	Conf.			Overall
Team	W		L	W		L
No. 10 Lehigh $^	7	–	0	12	–	1
Lafayette	6	–	1	8	–	4
Holy Cross	3	–	4	3	–	9
Richmond	3	–	4	7	–	5
Georgetown	3	–	4	6	–	6
Colgate	3	–	4	5	–	7
Bucknell	2	–	5	5	–	7
Fordham	1	–	6	1	–	11
$ – Conference champion; ^ – FCS playoff participant; Rankings from STATS Poll

The 2025 Lafayette Leopards football team represented Lafayette College as a member of the Patriot League during the 2025 NCAA Division I FCS football season. The Leopards were coached by fourth-year head coach John Troxell and played at the Fisher Stadium in Easton, Pennsylvania.

== Schedule ==
Date	Time	Opponent	Site	TV	Result	Attendance
August 28	6:00 p.m.	at Bowling Green*	Doyt Perry Stadium; Bowling Green, OH	ESPN+	L 7–26	19,328
September 6	1:00 p.m.	at Stonehill*	W.B. Mason Stadium; Easton, MA	NEC Front Row	W 42–26	2,351
September 13	1:00 p.m.	at Georgetown	Cooper Field; Washington, DC	ESPN+	W 42–37	1,131
September 19	6:00 p.m.	Columbia*	Fisher Stadium; Easton, PA	ESPN+	W 38–14	4,206
September 27	3:30 p.m.	Princeton*^{†}	Fisher Stadium; Easton, PA	ESPN+	L 28–38	7,127
October 4	12:30 p.m.	Fordham	Fisher Stadium; Easton, PA	ESPN+	W 24–10	4,020
October 11	12:30 p.m.	Bucknell	Fisher Stadium; Easton, PA	ESPN+	W 62–24	3,873
October 18	10:00 p.m.	at Oregon State*	Reser Stadium; Corvallis, OR	The CW	L 13–45	27,735
November 1	1:00 p.m.	at Holy Cross	Fitton Field; Worcester, MA	ESPN+	W 21–13	16,583
November 8	12:30 p.m.	Colgate	Fisher Stadium; Easton, PA	ESPN+	W 59–42	4,259
November 15	2:00 p.m.	at Richmond	E. Claiborne Robins Stadium; Richmond, VA	ESPN+	W 35–28	5,032
November 22	12:30 p.m.	No. 4 Lehigh	Fisher Stadium; Easton, PA (The Rivalry)	ESPN+	L 32–42	13,367
*Non-conference game; ^{†}Homecoming; Rankings from STATS Poll released prior to the game; All times are in Eastern time

== Game summaries ==
=== at Bowling Green (FBS) ===
Lafayette Leopards (0–0) at Bowling Green Falcons (FBS) (0–0) – Game summary

Quarter	1	2	3	4	Total
Leopards	0	0	7	0	7
Falcons (FBS)	7	10	6	3	26

at Doyt Perry Stadium • Bowling Green, Ohio

- Date: August 28
- Game time: 6:00 PM EDT
- Game weather: Sunny • Temperature: 67 °F (19 °C) • Wind: SW at 10 miles per hour (16 km/h)
- Game attendance: 19,328
- Referee: Rich Edwards
- TV announcers (ESPN+): Evan Stockton (play-by-play) and Marcus Ray (analyst)

Game information

First quarter

- BGSU – Cameron Pettaway 98-yard kickoff return (Jackson Kleather kick), 14:49. Falcons 7–0.

Second quarter

- BGSU – Jackson Kleather 30-yard field goal, 14:15. Falcons 10–0. Drive: 17 plays, 51 yards, 9:08.
- BGSU – Mar'Kel Porter 4-yard run (Jackson Kleather kick), 0:20. Falcons 17–0. Drive: 6 plays, 45 yards, 1:37.

Third quarter

- BGSU – Jackson Kleather 56-yard field goal, 10:11. Falcons 20–0. Drive: 7 plays, 27 yards, 3:19.
- LAF – Elijah Steward 5-yard pass from Dean DeNobile (Jack Simonetta kick), 3:39. Falcons 20–7. Drive: 14 plays, 75 yards, 6:32.
- BGSU – Jackson Kleather 39-yard field goal, 1:10. Falcons 23–7. Drive: 5 plays, 21 yards, 2:20.

Fourth quarter

- BGSU – Jackson Kleather 35-yard field goal, 4:47. Falcons 26–7. Drive: 6 plays, 11 yards, 2:00.

Statistics	LAF	BGSU
First downs	11	17
Plays–yards	56–184	61–267
Rushes–yards	28–66	43–158
Passing yards	118	109
Passing: comp–att–int	15–28–0	12–18–0
Turnovers	0	0
Time of possession	27:40	32:20

Team	Category	Player	Statistics
Lafayette	Passing	Dean DeNobile	13/26, 112 yards, TD
Lafayette	Rushing	Kente Edwards	10 carries, 27 yards
Lafayette	Receiving	Ethan Hosak	2 receptions, 30 yards
Bowling Green	Passing	Drew Pyne	12/18, 109 yards
Bowling Green	Rushing	Kaderris Roberts	12 carries, 66 yards
Bowling Green	Receiving	RJ Garcia II	2 receptions, 32 yards

=== at Stonehill ===
Lafayette Leopards (0-1) vs. Stonehill Skyhawks (0-1) – Game summary

Quarter	1	2	3	4	Total
Leopards	7	21	14	0	42
Skyhawks	0	6	7	13	26

at W.B. Mason Stadium • Easton, MA

- Date: September 6
- Game time: 1:00 PM EDT
- Game attendance: 2,351
- TV announcers (NEC Front Row): Charlie Bergeron (play-by-play) and Peter Cyzmbor (analyst)

Statistics	LAF	STO
First downs	22	21
Total yards	469	340
Rushing yards	319	71
Passing yards	150	269
Passing: Comp–Att–Int	12-19-1	25-35-1
Time of possession	30:09	29:51

Team	Category	Player	Statistics
Lafayette	Passing	Dean DeNobile	11/18, 132 yards, INT
Lafayette	Rushing	Kente Edwards	12 carries, 127 yards, 3 TD
Lafayette	Receiving	Carson Persing	5 receptions, 108 yards, TD
Stonehill	Passing	Jack O'Connell	25/35, 269 yards, 3 TD, INT
Stonehill	Rushing	Zavion Woodard	11 carries, 40 yards
Stonehill	Receiving	Zachary Kim	6 receptions, 78 yards, 2 TD

=== at Georgetown ===
Lafayette Leopards (1-1) vs. Georgetown Hoyas (2-0) – Game summary

Quarter	1	2	3	4	Total
Leopards	7	14	7	14	42
Hoyas	7	14	10	6	37

at Cooper Field • Washington, DC

- Date: September 13
- Game time: 1:00 PM EDT
- Game attendance: 1,131
- TV announcers (ESPN+): Jeremy Huber (play-by-play) and Christian Taylor (analyst)

Statistics	LAF	GTWN
First downs	26	26
Total yards	579	452
Rushing yards	289	90
Passing yards	290	362
Passing: Comp–Att–Int	18-28-1	32-51-1
Time of possession	27:45	32:15

Team	Category	Player	Statistics
Lafayette	Passing	Dean DeNobile	18/28, 290 yards, 2 TD, INT
Lafayette	Rushing	Kente Edwards	19 carries, 255 yards, 4 TD
Lafayette	Receiving	Elijah Steward	7 receptions, 113 yards, TD
Georgetown	Passing	Danny Lauter	27/45, 319 yards, 2 TD, INT
Georgetown	Rushing	Savion Hart	16 carries, 56 yards, 2 TD
Georgetown	Receiving	Jimmy Kibble	6 receptions, 97 yards

=== Columbia ===
Columbia Lions (0–0) vs. Lafayette Leopards (2–1) – Game summary

Quarter	1	2	3	4	Total
Lions	7	7	0	0	14
Leopards	10	7	14	7	38

at Fisher Stadium • Easton, PA

- Date: September 19
- Game time: 6:00 PM EDT
- Game weather: Sunny • Temperature: 80 °F (27 °C) • Wind: E at 7 miles per hour (11 km/h)
- Game attendance: 4,206
- Referee: Justin Ackley
- TV announcers (ESPN+): Gary Laubach (play-by-play), Mike Joseph (analyst) and Megan Caffrey (sideline)

Game information

First quarter

- (10:13) LAF – Jack Simonetta 37-yard field goal (Drive: 7 plays, 20 yards, 3:24; Lafayette 3-0)
- (7:32) LAF – Kente Edwards 13-yard run, Jack Simonetta kick (Drive: 3 plays, 61 yards, 1:16; Lafayette 10-0)
- (2:28) COLU – Hutch Crow 17-yard pass from Chase Goodwin, Hugo Merry kick (Drive: 11 plays, 75 yards, 5:04; Lafayette 10-7)

Second quarter

- (12:57) LAF – Kente Edwards 3-yard run, Jack Simonetta kick (Drive: 11 plays, 75 yards, 4:31; Lafayette 17-7)
- (0:59) COLU – Griffin Johnson 4-yard run, Hugo Merry kick (Drive: 12 plays, 74 yards, 5:27; Lafayette 17-14)

Third quarter

- (9:21) LAF – Kente Edwards 3-yard run, Jack Simonetta kick (Drive: 14 plays, 75 yards, 5:39; Lafayette 24-14)
- (6:45) LAF – Ethan Weber 1-yard run, Jack Simonetta kick (Drive: 6 plays, 46 yards, 1:56; Lafayette 31-14)

Fourth quarter

- (3:01) LAF – Ethan Weber 1-yard run, Jack Simonetta kick (Drive: 5 plays, 29 yards, 2:51; Lafayette 38-14)

Statistics	COLU	LAF
First downs	18	22
Total yards	289	398
Rushing yards	91	232
Passing yards	198	166
Passing: Comp–Att–Int	16–36–1	14–17–0
Time of possession	25:26	34:34

Team	Category	Player	Statistics
Columbia	Passing	Chase Goodwin	15/34, 195 yards, TD, INT
Columbia	Rushing	Michael Walters	12 carries, 63 yards
Columbia	Receiving	Titus Evans	3 receptions, 58 yards
Lafayette	Passing	Dean DeNobile	14/17, 166 yards
Lafayette	Rushing	Kente Edwards	25 carries, 150 yards, 3 TD
Lafayette	Receiving	Mason Kuehner	3 receptions, 58 yards

=== Princeton ===
Princeton Tigers (0-1) vs. Lafayette Leopards (3-1) – Game summary

Quarter	1	2	3	4	Total
Tigers	7	21	3	7	38
Leopards	0	14	0	14	28

at Fisher Stadium • Easton, PA

- Date: September 27
- Game time: 3:30 PM EDT
- Game weather: Cloudy • Wind: W at 2 miles per hour (3.2 km/h)
- Game attendance: 7,127
- Referee: Antonio Marcella
- TV announcers (ESPN+): Gary Laubach (play-by-play), Mike Joseph (analyst) and Megan Caffrey (sideline)

Game information

First quarter

- (4:51) PRIN – Ethan Clark 1-yard run, Esteban Nunez Perez kick (Drive: 13 plays, 80 yards, 6:33; Princeton 7-0)

Second quarter

- (14:40) LAF – Ethan Weber 9-yard run, Jack Simonetta kick (Drive: 11 plays, 67 yards, 5:11; 7-7)
- (9:16) PRIN – Dareion Murphy 4-yard run, Esteban Nunez Perez kick (Drive: 11 plays, 59 yards, 5:24; Princeton 14-7)
- (7:17) PRIN – Blaine Hipa 4-yard run, Esteban Nunez Perez kick (Drive: 3 plays, 32 yards, 1:44; Princeton 21-7)
- (2:08) PRIN – Torian Roberts 0-yard interception return, Esteban Nunez Perez kick (Drive: 5 plays, 21 yards, 2:17; Princeton 28-7)
- (0:12) LAF – Ethan Weber 1-yard run, Jack Simonetta kick (Drive: 10 plays, 80 yards, 1:56; Princeton 28-14)

Third quarter

- (3:40) PRIN – Will Cluskey 26-yard field goal (Drive: 19 plays, 81 yards, 8:56; Princeton 31-14)

Fourth quarter

- (12:27) LAF – Jakyre Henley 3-yard run, Jack Simonetta kick (Drive: 12 plays, 87 yards, 3:50; Princeton 31-21)
- (3:37) PRIN – Jackson Green 4-yard pass from Kai Colón, Esteban Nunez Perez kick (Drive: 14 plays, 54 yards, 7:13; Princeton 38-21)
- (0:37) LAF – Hunter Ditrano 2-yard pass from Dean DeNobile, Jack Simonetta kick (Drive: 13 plays, 65 yards, 3:00; Princeton 38-28)

Statistics	PRIN	LAF
First downs	25	20
Total yards	344	396
Rushing yards	125	126
Passing yards	219	270
Passing: Comp–Att–Int	22–33–0	27–37–1
Time of possession	35:48	24:12

Team	Category	Player	Statistics
Princeton	Passing	Kai Colón	13/20, 121 yards, TD
Princeton	Rushing	Kai Honda	6 rushes, 37 yards
Princeton	Receiving	Jackson Green	5 receptions, 64 yards, TD
Lafayette	Passing	Dean DeNobile	27/36, 256 yards, TD, INT
Lafayette	Rushing	Ethan Weber	18 rushes, 76 yards, 2 TD
Lafayette	Receiving	Elijah Steward	7 receptions, 81 yards

=== Fordham ===
Fordham Rams (1-4) vs. Lafayette Leopards (3-2) – Game summary

Quarter	1	2	3	4	Total
Rams	0	0	0	10	10
Leopards	0	14	7	3	24

at Fisher Stadium • Easton, PA

- Date: October 4
- Game time: 12:30 PM EDT
- Game weather: Sunny
- Game attendance: 4,020
- Referee: Marc Queen
- TV announcers (ESPN+): Gary Laubach (play-by-play), Mike Joseph (analyst) and Megan Caffrey (sideline)

Game information

First Quarter

No scoring plays

Second Quarter

- LAF - Matthew Scerbo 6-yard pass from Dean DeNobile (Jack Simonetta kick), 9:57. Leopards 7-0. Drive: 5 plays, 41 yards, 1:38.
- LAF - Carson Persing 3-yard pass from Dean DeNobile (Jack Simonetta kick), 3:52. Leopards 14-0. Drive: 9 plays, 94 yards, 4:24.

Third Quarter

- LAF - Dylan Aguilera 18-yard punt return (Jack Simonetta kick), 5:17. Leopards 21-0. Drive: 3 plays 74 yards, 1:55.

Fourth Quarter

- FOR - Troy Worrell 4-yard pass from Gunnar Smith (Bennett Henderson kick), 13:57. Leopards 21-7. Drive: 11 plays, 83 yards, 3:52.
- FOR - Bennett Henderson 35-yard Field Goal, 9:01. Leopards 21-10. Drive: 9 plays, 46 yards, 3:13.
- LAF - Jack Simonetta 19-yard Field Goal, 4:28. Leopards 24-10. Drive: 9 plays, 73 yards, 4:23.

Statistics	FOR	LAF
First downs	23	19
Total yards	405	402
Rushing yards	52	83
Passing yards	354	319
Passing: Comp–Att–Int	32–45–1	26–36–1
Time of possession	29:10	30:50

Team	Category	Player	Statistics
Fordham	Passing	Gunnar Smith	32/45, 354 yards, TD, INT
Fordham	Rushing	Ricky Parks	12 carries, 45 yards
Fordham	Receiving	Jack Freeburg	5 receptions, 113 yards
Lafayette	Passing	Dean DeNobile	25/35, 314 yards, 2 TD, INT
Lafayette	Rushing	Ethan Weber	19 carries, 67 yards
Lafayette	Receiving	Elijah Steward	5 receptions, 85 yards

=== Bucknell ===
Bucknell Bison (4-2) vs. Lafayette Leopards (4-2) – Game summary

Quarter	1	2	3	4	Total
Bison	0	10	14	0	24
Leopards	7	27	14	14	62

at Fisher Stadium • Easton, PA

- Date: October 11
- Game time: 12:30 PM EDT
- TV announcers (ESPN+): Gary Laubach (play-by-play), Mike Joseph (analyst) and Luke Meli (sideline)

Statistics	BUCK	LAF
First downs		
Total yards		
Rushing yards		
Passing yards		
Passing: Comp–Att–Int		
Time of possession		

Team	Category	Player	Statistics
Bucknell	Passing		
Bucknell	Rushing		
Bucknell	Receiving		
Lafayette	Passing		
Lafayette	Rushing		
Lafayette	Receiving		

=== at Oregon State (FBS) ===
Lafayette Leopards (5-2) at Oregon State Beavers (FBS) (0-7) – Game summary

Quarter	1	2	3	4	Total
Leopards	3	10	0	0	13
Beavers (FBS)	3	7	21	14	45

at Reser Stadium • Corvallis, OR

- Date: October 18
- Game time: 7:00 PM PDT
- Game weather: Cloudy • Temperature: 60 °F (16 °C) • Wind: SW at 5 miles per hour (8.0 km/h)
- Game attendance: 27,735
- Referee: Chris Wiggins
- TV announcers (The CW): Ted Robinson (play-by-play), Ryan Leaf (analyst) and Nigel Burton (sideline)

Game information

First quarter

- LAF – Jack Simonetta 28-yard field goal, 5:42. Leopards 3–0. Drive: 14 plays, 76 yards, 6:55.
- ORST – Caleb Ojeda 40-yard field goal, 1:33. Tied 3–3. Drive: 9 plays, 40 yards, 4:02.

Second quarter

- ORST – Anthony Hankerson 1-yard run (Caleb Ojeda kick), 6:03. Beavers 10–3. Drive: 5 plays, 18 yards, 2:18.
- LAF – Matthew Scerbo 15-yard pass from Dean DeNobile (Jack Simonetta kick), 1:48. Tied 10–10. DrivE: 10 plays, 75 yards, 4:15.
- LAF – Jack Simonetta 37-yard field goal, 0:04. Leopards 13–10. Drive: 7 plays, 44 yards, 0:36.

Third quarter

- ORST– Gabe Milbourn 1-yard pass from Gabarri Johnson (Caleb Ojeda kick), 7:56. Beavers 17–13. Drive: 7 plays, 73 yards, 2:57.
- ORST – Gabarri Johnson 20-yard run (Caleb Ojeda kick), 3:38. Beavers 24–13. Drive: 4 plays, 81 yards, 1:57.
- ORST – Anthony Hankerson 15-yard run (Caleb Ojeda kick), 1:29. Beavers 31–13. Drive: 3 plays, 44 yards, 1:46.

Fourth quarter

- ORST – Anthony Hankerson 9-yard run (Caleb Ojeda kick), 9:00. Beavers 38–13. Drive: 7 plays, 78 yards, 3:12.
- ORST – Anthony Hankerson 65-yard run (Caleb Ojeda kick), 6:39. Beavers 45–13. Drive: 1 play, 65 yards, 0:12.

Statistics	LAF	ORST
First downs	17	23
Plays–yards	71–269	65–517
Rushes–yards	30–87	42–365
Passing yards	182	152
Passing: comp–att–int	19–41–1	17–23–1
Turnovers	1	2
Time of possession	30:09	29:51

Team	Category	Player	Statistics
Lafayette	Passing	Dean DeNobile	18/40, 176 yards, TD, INT
Lafayette	Rushing	Kente Edwards	13 carries, 41 yards
Lafayette	Receiving	Elijah Steward	4 receptions, 68 yards
Oregon State	Passing	Gabarri Johnson	7/9, 79 yards, TD, INT
Oregon State	Rushing	Anthony Hankerson	25 carries, 204 yards, 4 TD
Oregon State	Receiving	Gabe Milbourn	6 receptions, 48 yards, TD

=== at Holy Cross ===
Lafayette Leopards (5-3) vs. Holy Cross Crusaders (1-7) – Game summary

Quarter	1	2	3	4	Total
Leopards	-	-	-	-	0
Crusaders	-	-	-	-	0

at Fitton Field • Worcester, MA

- Date: November 1
- Game time: 12:00 PM EDT

Statistics	LAF	HC
First downs		
Total yards		
Rushing yards		
Passing yards		
Passing: Comp–Att–Int		
Time of possession		

Team	Category	Player	Statistics
Lafayette	Passing		
Lafayette	Rushing		
Lafayette	Receiving		
Holy Cross	Passing		
Holy Cross	Rushing		
Holy Cross	Receiving		

=== Colgate ===
Colgate Raiders (4-5) vs. Lafayette Leopards (6-3) – Game summary

Quarter	1	2	3	4	Total
Raiders	7	14	7	14	42
Leopards	14	24	7	14	59

at Fisher Stadium • Easton, PA

- Date: November 8
- Game time: 12:30 PM EST
- Game weather: Sunny • Temperature: 61 °F (16 °C) • Wind: E at 7 miles per hour (11 km/h)
- Game attendance: 4,259
- Referee: Alex Parella
- TV: ESPN+

Game information

First Quarter

- (12:46) LAF – Ethan Hosak 3-yard pass from Dean DeNobile, Jack Simonetta kick (Drive: 6 plays, 75 yards, 2:14; Lafayette 7–0)
- (3:50) LAF – Kente Edwards 29-yard run, Jack Simonetta kick (Drive: 7 plays, 88 yards, 3:01; Lafayette 14–0)
- (0:58) COL – Matt Fogler 34-yard pass from Jake Stearney, Luke Vogeler kick (Drive: 6 plays, 65 yards, 2:52; Lafayette 14–7)

Second Quarter

- (14:56) COL – Zach Osborne 2-yard run, Luke Vogeler kick (Drive: 3 plays, 25 yards, 0:56; Tied 14–14)
- (10:37) LAF – Carson Persing 28-yard pass from Dean DeNobile, Jack Simonetta kick (Drive: 9 plays, 75 yards, 4:19; Lafayette 21–14)
- (5:56) COL – Matt Fogler 11-yard pass from Jake Stearney, Luke Vogeler kick (Drive: 10 plays, 75 yards, 4:41; Tied 21–21)
- (3:43) LAF – Zane Wooldridge 39-yard pass from Dean DeNobile, Jack Simonetta kick (Drive: 6 plays, 76 yards, 2:13; Lafayette 28–21)
- (0:41) LAF – Kente Edwards 6-yard run, Jack Simonetta kick (Drive: 5 plays, 26 yards, 1:07; Lafayette 35–21)
- (0:00) LAF – Jack Simonetta 49-yard field goal (Drive: 2 plays, 0 yards, 0:07; Lafayette 38–21)

Third Quarter

- (10:14) COL – Reed Swanson 7-yard pass from Jake Stearney, Luke Vogeler kick (Drive: 4 plays, 21 yards, 1:52; Lafayette 38–28)
- (7:45) LAF – Mason Kuehner 19-yard pass from Dean DeNobile, Jack Simonetta kick (Drive: 5 plays, 52 yards, 2:29; Lafayette 45–28)

Fourth Quarter

- (9:28) LAF – Kente Edwards 49-yard run, Jack Simonetta kick (Drive: 3 plays, 66 yards, 1:32; Lafayette 52–28)
- (5:02) COL – Matt Fogler 18-yard pass from Jackson Kilburg, Luke Vogeler kick (Drive: 9 plays, 75 yards, 4:26; Lafayette 52–35)
- (1:54) LAF – Shaun Purvy 26-yard pass from Daniel Lipovski, Jack Simonetta kick (Drive: 2 plays, 25 yards, 0:45; Lafayette 59–35)
- (0:22) COL – Michael Stevenson 2-yard pass from Jackson Kilburg, Luke Vogeler kick (Drive: 8 plays, 75 yards, 1:32; Lafayette 59–42)

Statistics	COLG	LAF
First downs	28	27
Total yards	436	533
Rushing yards	126	301
Passing yards	310	232
Passing: Comp–Att–Int	33–49–3	19–30–1
Time of possession	31:46	28:14

Team	Category	Player	Statistics
Colgate	Passing	Jake Stearney	22/37, 213 yards, 3 TD, 2 INT
Colgate	Rushing	Danny Shaban	7 carries, 43 yards
Colgate	Receiving	Reed Swanson	9 receptions, 96 yards, TD
Lafayette	Passing	Dean DeNobile	18/29, 206 yards, 4 TD, INT
Lafayette	Rushing	Kente Edwards	20 carries, 260 yards, 3 TD
Lafayette	Receiving	Zane Wooldridge	4 receptions, 70 yards, TD

=== at Richmond ===
Lafayette Leopards (7–3) vs. Richmond Spiders (6–4) – Game summary

Quarter	1	2	3	4	Total
Leopards	7	7	14	7	35
Spiders	0	7	7	14	28

at E. Claiborne Robins Stadium • Richmond, VA

- Date: November 15
- Game time: 2:00 PM EST
- Game weather: Cloudy • Temperature: 71 °F (22 °C) • Wind: SW at 6 miles per hour (9.7 km/h)
- Game attendance: 5,032
- Referee: Jeff Pumphrey
- TV announcers (ESPN+/MASN): Bob Black (play-by-play), Chris Anderson (analyst) and Guerin Austin (sideline)

Game information

First Quarter

- (4:16) LAF - Dean DeNobile 17-yard pass to Carson Persing, Jack Simonetta kick (Drive: 9 Plays, 74 yards, 4:38; LAF 7–0)

Second Quarter

- (12:56) RICH - Kyle Wickersham 1-yard run, Jayden Alsheskie kick (Drive: 12 Plays, 71 yards, 6:20; TIED 7–7)
- (10:20) LAF - Dean DeNobile 26-yard pass to Nick Bierman, Jack Simonetta kick (Drive: 6 Plays, 83 yards, 2:36; LAF 14–7)

Third Quarter

- (12:44) LAF - Dean DeNobile 21-yard pass to Nick Bierman, Jack Simonetta kick (Drive: 5 Plays, 75 yards, 2:16; LAF 21–7)
- (2:56) RICH - Kyle Wickersham 32-yard pass to Ja'Vion Griffin, Jayden Alsheskie kick (Drive: 9 Plays, 72 yards, 4:34; LAF 21–14)
- (2:15) LAF - Kente Edwards 61-yard run, Jack Simonetta kick (Drive: 2 Plays, 65 yards, 0:41; LAF 28–14)

Fourth Quarter

- (6:50) RICH - Aziz Foster-Powell 12-yard run, Jayden Alsheskie kick (Drive: 2 Plays, 23 yards, 0:26; LAF 28–21)
- (6:09) LAF - Kente Edwards 70-yard run, Jack Simonetta kick (Drive: 2 Plays, 75 yards, 0:41; LAF 35–21)
- (1:18) RICH - Kyle Wickersham 5-yard pass to Andreas Hill, Jayden Alsheskie kick (Drive: 19 Plays, 82 yards, 4:51; LAF 35–28)

Statistics	LAF	RICH
First downs	18	27
Total yards	419	480
Rushing yards	254	147
Passing yards	165	333
Passing: Comp–Att–Int	14–22–1	33–64–1
Time of possession	23:31	36:29

Team	Category	Player	Statistics
Lafayette	Passing	Dean DeNobile	14–21, 165 yards, 3 TD
Lafayette	Rushing	Kente Edwards	26 carries, 265 yards, 2 TD
Lafayette	Receiving	Carson Persing	6 receptions, 93 yards, TD
Richmond	Passing	Kyle Wickersham	20/35, 234 yards, 2 TD
Richmond	Rushing	Aziz Foster-Powell	12 carries, 70 yards, TD
Richmond	Receiving	Ja'Vion Griffin	10 receptions, 113 yards, TD

=== No. 4 Lehigh (The Rivalry) ===
No. 4 Lehigh Mountain Hawks (11-0) vs. Lafayette Leopards (8-3) – Game summary

Quarter	1	2	3	4	Total
No. 4 Mountain Hawks	7	7	14	14	42
Leopards	7	10	7	8	32

at Fisher Stadium • Easton, PA

- Date: November 22
- Game time: 12:30 PM EST
- Game weather: Sunny • Temperature: 48 °F (9 °C) • Wind: E at 6 miles per hour (9.7 km/h)
- Game attendance: 13,367
- Referee: Tom Zwtts
- TV announcers (ESPN+): Gary Laubach (play-by-play), Mike Joseph (analyst) and Meghan Capanna (sideline)

Game information

First Quarter

- (LAF): 8:00 - Kente Edwards 1 yard run, Jack Simonetta kick (Drive: 14 plays, 75 yards, 7:00 LAF 7-0)
- (LEH): 4:46 - Luke Yoder 29 yard run, Connor Poole kick (Drive: 7 plays, 65 yards, 3:14 TIED 7-7

Second Quarter

- (LAF): 14:21 - Dean DeNobile 2 yard run, Jack Simonetta kick (Drive: 14 plays, 80 yards, 5:25 LAF 14-7)
- (LEH): 7:32 - Mason Humphrey 77 yard pass from Hayden Johnson, Connor Poole kick (Drive: 2 plays, 89 yards, 0:44 TIED 14-14)
- (LAF): 1:03 - Jack Simonetta 21 yard field goal (Drive: 14 plays, 52 yards, 6:29 LAF 17-14)

Third Quarter

- (LEH): 14:42 - Luke Yoder 80 yard run, Connor Poole kick (Drive: 1 play, 80 yards, 0:18 LEH 21-17)
- (LAF): 2:46 - Kente Edwards 1 yard run, Jack Simonetta kick (Drive: 13 plays, 97 yards, 5:59 LAF 24-21)
- (LEH): 0:48 - Luke Yoder 3 yard run, Connor Poole kick (Drive: 4 plays, 73 yards, 1:58 LEH 28-24)

Fourth Quarter

- (LEH): 10:20 - Luke Yoder 6 yard run, Connor Poole kick (Drive 7 plays, 47 yards, 3:24 LEH 35-24)
- (LAF): 7:14 - Kente Edwards 4 yard run, Jason Penza pass to Mason Kuehner for two-point conversion (Drive: 8 plays, 75 yards, 3:06 LEH 35-32)
- (LEH): 1:53 - Hayden Johnson 1 yard run, Connor Poole kick (Drive: 10 plays, 75 yards, 5:21 LEH 42-32)

Statistics	LEH	LAF
First downs	18	27
Total yards	479	424
Rushing yards	320	149
Passing yards	159	275
Passing: Comp–Att–Int	11–16–1	26–38–1
Time of possession	24:22	35:38

Team	Category	Player	Statistics
Lehigh	Passing	Hayden Johnson	11/16, 159 yards, TD, INT
Lehigh	Rushing	Luke Yoder	19 carries, 234 yards, 4 TD
Lehigh	Receiving	Mason Humphrey	2 receptions, 83 yards, TD
Lafayette	Passing	Dean DeNobile	26/37, 275 yards
Lafayette	Rushing	Kente Edwards	41 carries, 157 yards, 3 TD
Lafayette	Receiving	Mason Kuehner	11 receptions, 99 yards
