= Dean DeNobile =

American football quarterback (born 2003)

No. 4 – Florida State Seminoles
- Position: Quarterback
- Class: Senior (graduate transfer)

Personal information
- Born: March 31, 2003 (age 23)
- Listed height: 6 ft 2 in (1.88 m)
- Listed weight: 205 lb (93 kg)

Career information
- High school: Morris Catholic (Denville Township, New Jersey)
- College: Lafayette (2021–2025); Florida State (2026–present)

Awards and highlights
- First-team All-Patriot League (2025); Second-team All-Patriot League (2023)
- Stats at ESPN

Dean DeNobile (born March 31, 2003) is an American college football quarterback for the Florida State Seminoles. He previously played for the Lafayette Leopards of the Patriot League, where he was a two-time team captain and set multiple program passing records.

== Early life ==
DeNobile attended Bergen Catholic High School in Oradell, New Jersey, and transferred after his sophomore year to Morris Catholic High School, where he threw for over 4,300 yards and 44 touchdowns during his varsity career.

== College career ==
=== Lafayette ===
DeNobile played five seasons for the Lafayette Leopards, starting 36 of the team's last 37 games at quarterback. He finished his career ranked third in program history in completion percentage (65.2%), fourth in completions (619), and fifth in passing yards (6,956). He also accumulated 53 passing touchdowns and added 10 rushing touchdowns.

In 2023, he earned Second-Team All-Patriot League honors after throwing for 1,997 yards and a career-high 20 touchdowns.

His best statistical season came in 2025, when he passed for a career-high 2,542 yards with 19 touchdowns and 7 interceptions, despite playing through injury late in the year. He was named a team captain for the second straight season and earned First-Team All-Patriot League recognition.

=== Florida State ===
On January 16, 2026, DeNobile committed to Florida State during an on-campus visit, as an addition to the quarterback room alongside transfers like Ashton Daniels from Auburn.

== Statistics ==
Season	Team	Games			Passing								Rushing			
Season	Team	GP	GS	Record	Cmp	Att	Pct	Yds	Avg	TD	Int	Rtg	Att	Yds	Avg	TD
2022	Lafayette	Redshirt														
2023	Lafayette	12	11	8–3	170	255	66.7	1,997	7.8	20	5	154.4	86	180	2.1	6
2024	Lafayette	12	12	6–6	226	346	65.3	2,417	7.0	14	11	131.0	54	5	0.1	2
2025	Lafayette	12	12	8-4	223	347	64.3	2,528	7.3	19	7	139.5	30	-1	0.0	2
Career		36	35	22-13	619	948	65.3	6,942	7.3	53	23	165.0	170	184	1.1	10
