= 2025 Lehigh Mountain Hawks football team =

American college football season

2025 Lehigh Mountain Hawks football

Patriot League champion

NCAA Division I Second Round, L 7–14 vs. Villanova
- Conference: Patriot League

Ranking
- STATS: No. 10
- FCS Coaches: No. 9
- Record: 12–1 (7–0 Patriot)
- Head coach: Kevin Cahill (3rd season)
- Offensive coordinator: Dan Hunt (3rd season)
- Defensive coordinator: Rich Nagy (3rd season)
- Home stadium: Goodman Stadium

Uniform
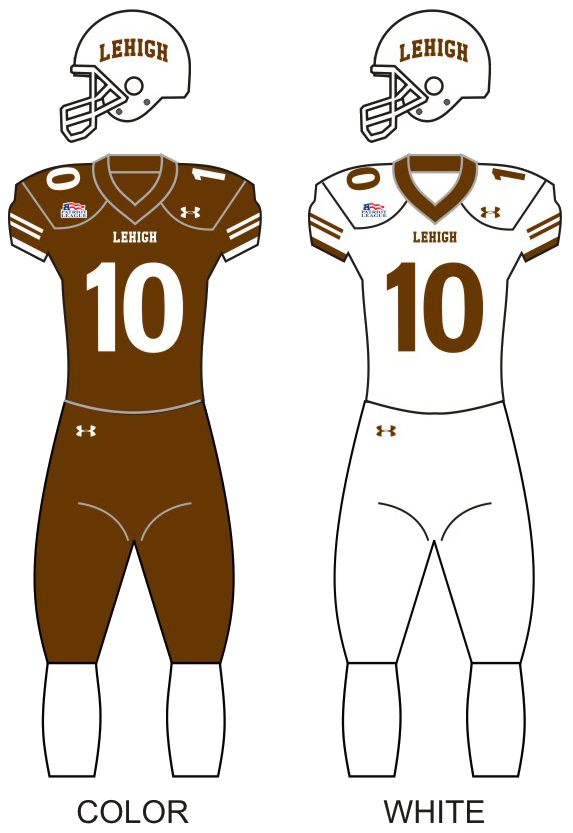

2025 Patriot League football standings
| | Conf. | | | Overall |
| Team | W | | L | W | | L |
|---|---|---|---|---|---|---|
| No. 10 Lehigh $^ | 7 | – | 0 | 12 | – | 1 |
| Lafayette | 6 | – | 1 | 8 | – | 4 |
| Holy Cross | 3 | – | 4 | 3 | – | 9 |
| Richmond | 3 | – | 4 | 7 | – | 5 |
| Georgetown | 3 | – | 4 | 6 | – | 6 |
| Colgate | 3 | – | 4 | 5 | – | 7 |
| Bucknell | 2 | – | 5 | 5 | – | 7 |
| Fordham | 1 | – | 6 | 1 | – | 11 |
$ – Conference champion; ^ – FCS playoff participant; Rankings from STATS Poll

The 2025 Lehigh Mountain Hawks football team represented Lehigh University as a member of the Patriot League during the 2025 NCAA Division I FCS football season. The Mountain Hawks were led by third-year head coach Kevin Cahill and played at the Goodman Stadium in Lower Saucon Township, Pennsylvania.

== Preseason ==
Last season Lehigh had defied all expectations and improved from their 2–9 record in 2023 to finish 9–4 and winning the Patriot League title as well as an FCS playoff berth. Due to this, in the offseason, Lehigh was able to use the transfer portal to sign five new highly ranked student athletes on signing day, joining another six high level recruits recruited earlier. Additionally, senior defensive lineman Matt Spatny was added to the preseason watch list for the Buck Buchanan Award, which is awarded to the top defensive player in FCS football, having earned an honorable mention to the first-team all-Patriot league all-American team last season.

=== Award watch lists ===
| Award | Player | Position | Year |
|---|---|---|---|
| Buck Buchanan Award | Matt Spatny | DL | SR |

== Schedule ==
| Date | Time | Opponent | Rank | Site | TV | Result | Attendance |
|---|---|---|---|---|---|---|---|
| August 30 | 12:00 p.m. | No. 25 Richmond | No. 14 | Goodman Stadium; Lower Saucon, PA | ESPN+ | W 21–14 | 4,463 |
| September 6 | 12:00 p.m. | Sacred Heart* | No. 11 | Goodman Stadium; Lower Saucon, PA | ESPN+ | W 28–10 | 3,618 |
| September 13 | 12:00 p.m. | at Duquesne* | No. 10 | Arthur J. Rooney Athletic Field; Pittsburgh, PA | NEC Front Row | W 35–21 | 1,703 |
| September 20 | 6:00 p.m. | at Bucknell | No. 10 | Christy Mathewson–Memorial Stadium; Lewisburg, PA | ESPN+ | W 41–24 | 3,143 |
| September 27 | 12:00 p.m. | Penn* | No. 10 | Goodman Stadium; Lower Saucon, PA | ESPN+ | W 44–30 | 8,435 |
| October 4 | 12:00 p.m. | Yale* | No. 9 | Goodman Stadium; Lower Saucon, PA (Yank Townsend Trophy) | ESPN+ | W 31–13 | 4,364 |
| October 11 | 12:00 p.m. | at Columbia* | No. 7 | Wien Stadium; New York, NY | ESPN+ | W 31–7 | 3,049 |
| October 25 | 1:00 p.m. | at Fordham | No. 7 | Coffey Field; Bronx, NY | ESPN+ | W 27–6 | 4,893 |
| November 1 | 12:00 p.m. | Georgetown | No. 7 | Goodman Stadium; Lower Saucon, PA | ESPN+ | W 41–0 | 4,478 |
| November 8 | 12:00 p.m. | Holy Cross | No. 4 | Goodman Stadium; Lower Saucon, PA | ESPN+ | W 38–3 | 5,346 |
| November 15 | 1:00 p.m. | at Colgate | No. 4 | Crown Field at Andy Kerr Stadium; Hamilton, NY | ESPN+ | W 27–7 | 1,227 |
| November 22 | 12:30 p.m. | at Lafayette | No. 4 | Fisher Stadium; Easton, PA (The Rivalry) | ESPN+ | W 42–32 | 13,367 |
| December 6 | 12:00 p.m. | No. 9 Villanova* | No. 4 | Goodman Stadium; Lower Saucon, PA (NCAA Division I Second Round) | ESPN+ | L 7–14 | 8,848 |
*Non-conference game; Rankings from STATS Poll released prior to the game; All times are in Eastern time

== Game summaries ==
=== No. 25 Richmond ===
No. 25 Richmond Spiders (0–0) at No. 14 Lehigh Mountain Hawks (0–0) – Game summary

| Quarter | 1 | 2 | 3 | 4 | Total |
|---|---|---|---|---|---|
| No. 25 Spiders | 7 | 0 | 7 | 0 | 14 |
| No. 14 Mountain Hawks | 0 | 7 | 7 | 7 | 21 |

at Goodman Stadium • Lower Saucon Township, PA

- Date: August 30
- Game time: 12:00 PM EDT
- Game weather: Sunny
- Game attendance: 4,463
- Referee: Cory Hanson
- TV announcers (ESPN+): Bob Black (play-by-play), Jasmonn Coleman (analyst) and Chris Anderson (sideline)

Game information

First Quarter

- (2:53) RICH – Kyle Wickersham 1-yard run, Will McManus kick (Drive: 5 Plays, 27 yards, 2:49; RICH 7–0)

Second Quarter

- (0:56) LEH – Hadeyn Jonson 13-yard touchdown pass to Jaden Green, Nick Garrido kick (Drive: 6 Plays, 80 yards, 1:26; TIED 7–7)

Third Quarter

- (11:18) LEH – Hadeyn Jonson 29-yard pass to Geoffrey Jamiel, Nick Garrido kick (Drive: 8 Plays, 75 yards, 3:42; LEH 14–7)
- (11:04) RICH – Isaiah Dawson 99-yard kickoff return, Jayden Alsheskie Kick (Drive: 1 Play, 99 yards, 0:14; TIED 14–14)

Fourth Quarter

- (13:33) LEH – Jaden Green 4-yard run, Nick Garrido kick (Drive: 12 Plays, 87 yards, 7:04 LEH 21–14)

| Statistics | RICH | LEH |
|---|---|---|
| First downs | 10 | 21 |
| Total yards | 181 | 298 |
| Rushing yards | 68 | 163 |
| Passing yards | 113 | 135 |
| Passing: Comp–Att–Int | 14/20/1 | 13/24/2 |
| Time of possession | 28:25 | 31:35 |

| Team | Category | Player | Statistics |
|---|---|---|---|
| Richmond | Passing | Kyle Wickersham | 113 YRD/14 COMP/20 ATP/0 TD/1 INT |
| Richmond | Rushing | Aziz Foster-Powell | 9 CaliforniaR/32 YRD/0 TD |
| Richmond | Receiving | Jaiden Fair | 4 REC/52 YRD |
| Lehigh | Passing | Hayden Johnson | 125 YRD/13 COMP/24 ATP/2 TD/2 INT |
| Lehigh | Rushing | Jaden Green | 13 CaliforniaR/88 YRD/1 TD |
| Lehigh | Receiving | Geoffrey Jamiel | 4 REC/68 YRD/1 TD |

Lehigh's season opener was a rematch of the first round of the FCS playoffs against the Richmond Spiders, their first game as a member of the Patriot League. Both Lehigh and Richmond went into the game ranked, at No. 15 and No. 22 respectively with uncharacteristically high turnout for the Lehigh home-game as Lehigh also introduced a ceremonial bell ringing at the start of the game. Lehigh would win the coin toss but defer to the second half, with the Spiders scoring on their first drive with just nine seconds left in the first quarter, a one-yard rush up the middle on the goal-line. With just one minute to go in the second quarter the Mountain Hawks would answer and tie the game with a 13-yard touchdown pass from sophomores Hayden Johnson to Jaden Green. Lehigh would gain the lead with four minutes left in the third quarter with a 29-yard touchdown pass from Johnson to senior WR Geoffrey Jamiel. Richmond answered immediately with a 99-yard kick return, tying the game 14–14. Halfway into the fourth quarter Green would score on a four-yard rush, with the Mountain Hawks taking the lead again 21–14. A big three-and-out and interception in the fourth quarter by Lehigh's defense put the game away.

=== Sacred Heart ===
Sacred Heart Pioneers (1–0) at No. 11 Lehigh Mountain Hawks (1–0) – Game summary

| Quarter | 1 | 2 | 3 | 4 | Total |
|---|---|---|---|---|---|
| Pioneers | 7 | 0 | 3 | 0 | 10 |
| No. 11 Mountain Hawks | 7 | 14 | 0 | 7 | 28 |

at Goodman Stadium • Lower Saucon Township, PA

- Date: September 6
- Game time: 12:00 PM EDT
- Game weather: Sunny
- Game attendance: 3,618
- Referee: Henry Wimberg
- TV announcers (ESPN+): Marco Socci (play-by-play) and Mike Yadush (analyst)

Game information

First Quarter

- (14:47) SHU – Dean Hangey 91 yard kickoff return, Matt Kling kick (Drive: 1 play, 91 yards, 0:13; SHU 7–0)
- (11:38) LEH – Luke Yoder 28 yard run, Nick Garrido kick (Drive: 6 plays, 75 yards, 3:09 TIED 7–7)

Second Quarter

- (14:12) LEH – Jaden Green 10 yard run, Nick Garrido kick (Drive: 3 plays, 43 yards, 1:25; LEH 14–7)
- (1:06) LEH – Hayden Johnson 20 yard run, Nick Garrido kick (Drive: 4 plays, 33 yards, 0:31; LEH 21–7)

Third Quarter

- (8:13) SHU – Matt Kling 32 yard field goal (Drive: 10 plays, 65 yards, 5:17; LEH 21–10)

Fourth Quarter

- (14:55) LEH – Matt Machalik 2 yard run, Nick Garrido kick (Drive: 11 plays, 75 yards, 6:13; LEH 28–10)

| Statistics | SHU | LEH |
|---|---|---|
| First downs | 14 | 21 |
| Total yards | 177 | 423 |
| Rushing yards | 70 | 286 |
| Passing yards | 107 | 137 |
| Passing: Comp–Att–Int | 16/26/0 | 11/18/1 |
| Time of possession | 26:23 | 33:37 |

| Team | Category | Player | Statistics |
|---|---|---|---|
| Sacred Heart | Passing | Jack Snyder | 94 YRDS/14 COMP/20 ATP/0 TD/ 0 INT |
| Sacred Heart | Rushing | Jack Snyder | 9 CaliforniaR/ 30 YRD/0 TD |
| Sacred Heart | Receiving | Payton Rhoades | 4 REC/26 YRD |
| Lehigh | Passing | Hayden Johnson | 129 YRDS/10 COMP/17 ATP/0 TD/1 INT |
| Lehigh | Rushing | Luke Yoder | 12 CaliforniaR/127 YRD/1 TD |
| Lehigh | Receiving | Goeffrey Jamiel | 5 REC/60 YRD |

As part of the University Day celebrations at Lehigh, Softball player Jenny Bender, ‘03, soccer player Andrew Mittendorf, ‘99, and former Dean of Athletics Joe Sterrett were honored on the field as the school's newest inductees into their hall of fame during halftime. The Sacred Heart University Pioneers started the game by returning the opening kick for a touchdown. However, after getting the ball back, Lehigh would answer with a Luke Yoder rushing touchdown of their own. Halfway through the first quarter the Mountain Hawk's Hayden Johnson threw an interception to SHU safety Daimon Jacobs, who then fumbled the ball which was recovered by Lehigh lineman Charles Soska, allowing Lehigh's drive to continue. The Pioneer's offense would only score a single field goal, while Lehigh put up four rushing touchdowns by four different players for a final score of 28–10. This would be the first time Lehigh would go 2–0 since 2013. This was just the second time Lehigh and Sacred Heart had played each other, and with the Lehigh win the series record stands at 1–1.

=== at Duquesne ===
No. 10 Lehigh Mountain Hawks (2–0) at Duquesne Dukes (1–1) – Game summary

| Quarter | 1 | 2 | 3 | 4 | Total |
|---|---|---|---|---|---|
| No. 10 Mountain Hawks | 0 | 14 | 14 | 7 | 35 |
| Dukes | 0 | 7 | 7 | 7 | 21 |

at Rooney Field • Pittsburgh, PA

- Date: September 13
- Game time: 12:00 PM EDT
- Game weather: Sunny • Temperature: 77 °F (25 °C) • Wind: E at 2 miles per hour (3.2 km/h)
- Game attendance: 1,703
- Referee: Travis Barta
- TV announcers (NEC Front Row): Tim Benz (play-by-play) and Ellis Cannon (analyst)

Game information

First Quarter

No scoring plays

Second Quarter

- (LEH): 12:28 – Garrett Guess 13 Yard pass from Hayden Johnson, Nick Garrido kick (Drive: 10 plays, 64 yards, 4:41 LEH 7–0)
- (DUQ): 2:32 – Daniel Tarabrella 8 Yard pass from Tyler Riddell, Matt Marcinko kick (Drive: 9 plays, 80 yards, 4:35 TIED 7–7)
- (LEH): 0:35 – Geoffrey Jamiel 54 Yard pass from Hayden Johnson, Nick Garrido kick (Drive: 1 play, 54 yards, 0:10 LEH 14–7)

Third Quarter

- (LEH): 9:47 – Matt D'Avino 8 Yard pass from Hayden Johnson, Nick Garrido kick (Drive: 8 plays, 63 yards, 4:22 LEH 21–7)
- (DUQ): 7:47 – Joey Isabella 8 Yard pass from Tyler Riddell, Matt Marcinko kick (Drive: 4 plays, 80 yards, 1:55 LEH 21–14)
- (LEH): 4:30 – Jayden Green 27 Yard run, Nick Garrido kick (Drive: 7 plays, 75 yards, 3:17 LEH 28–14)

Fourth Quarter

- (DUQ): 12:37 – Logan Kushner 1 Yard rim, Matt Marcinko kick (Drive: 13 plays, 83 yards, 6:48 LEH 28–21)
- (LEH): 7:29 – Aaron Crossley 1 Yard run, Nick Garrido kick (Drive: 8 plays, 59 yards, 4:59LEH 35–21)

| Statistics | LEH | DUQ |
|---|---|---|
| First downs | 20 | 16 |
| Total yards | 396 | 318 |
| Rushing yards | 172 | 102 |
| Passing yards | 224 | 216 |
| Passing: Comp–Att–Int | 17/25/0 | 17/28/1 |
| Time of possession | 31:46 | 28:14 |

| Team | Category | Player | Statistics |
|---|---|---|---|
| Lehigh | Passing | Hayden Johnson | 224 YRD/17 COMP/25 ATP/3 TD/ 0 INT |
| Lehigh | Rushing | Luke Yoder | 11 CaliforniaR/ 68 YRD |
| Lehigh | Receiving | Geoffrey Jamiel | 7 REC/ 95 YRD/ 1 TD |
| Duquesne | Passing | Tyler Riddell | 216 YRD/17 COMP/28 ATP/2 TD/ 1INT |
| Duquesne | Rushing | Shawn Solomon Jr. | 13 CaliforniaR/ 43 YRD |
| Duquesne | Receiving | Joey Isabella | 8 REC/ 153 YRD/ 1 TD |

The first ever meeting between the Mountain Hawks and the Duquesne Dukes and a back-and-forth affair, the teams traded a pair of touchdowns in the second quarter including a ricocheted pass TD from Johnson intended for Jamiel that was hauled in by Garrett Guess after deflecting off a Duke defender with the Dukes then scoring following a 35-yard pass from Tyler Riddell to Joey Isabella on the next drive. With just 54 seconds left in the first half Johnson found Jamiel for a 54-yard pass in the end zone to put Lehigh up 14–7. After forcing a three-and-out, Lehigh would score on their opening drive of the second half before Riddle found Isabella again, this time for a 66-yard touchdown pass. Lehigh answered with a 16-yard TD from Johnson to Mason Humphrey but so would Duquesne with a thirteen play drive capped off by a 1-yard Logan Kushner rushing touchdown. After a good kickoff return, Lehigh mounted a 59-yard drive to take the final lead late in the third quarter. Duquesne would have a chance to answer, however, a key strip-sack by senior LB Tyler Ochojski ended the game. With the win head coach Kevin Cahill moved above .500 on his win percentage at Lehigh for the first time, especially important for the school as their last head coach, Tom Gilmore, went 9–27 during the four years prior to Cahill.

=== at Bucknell ===
No. 10 Lehigh Mountain Hawks (3–0) at Bucknell Bison (2–1) – Game summary

| Quarter | 1 | 2 | 3 | 4 | Total |
|---|---|---|---|---|---|
| No. 10 Mountain Hawks | 10 | 7 | 21 | 3 | 41 |
| Bison | 3 | 7 | 0 | 14 | 24 |

at Christy Mathewson–Memorial Stadium • Lewisburg, PA

- Date: September 20
- Game time: 6:00 PM EDT
- Game weather: Sunny
- Game attendance: 3,143
- Referee: Todd Bowman
- TV announcers (ESPN+): Doug Birdsong (play-by-play) and Charlie Fisher (analyst)

Game information

First Quarter

- (LEH): 11:44 – Nick Garrido 24 Yard field goal (Drive: 7 plays, 28 yards, 3:04 LEH 3–0)
- (LEH): 7:03 – Jaden Green 12 Yard rush, Nick Garrido kick (Drive: 5 plays, 55 yards, 2:37 LEH 10–0)
- (BUCK): 3:49 – Matt Schearer 29 Yard field goal (Drive: 6 plays, 73 yards, 3:08 LEH 10–3)

Second Quarter

- (LEH): 10:08 – Luke Yoder 1 Yard rush, Nick Garrido kick (Drive: 11 plays, 98 yards, 5:39 LEH 17–3)
- (BUCK): 4:29 – Ralph Rucker IV 5 Yard rush, Matt Schearer kick (Drive: 12 plays, 85 yards, 5:39 LEH 17–10)

Third Quarter

- (LEH): 11:54 – Jaden Green 23 Yard rush, Nick Garrido kick (Drive: 4 plays, 65 yards, 3:06 LEH 24–10)
- (LEH): 7:30 – Jaden Green 6 Yard rush, Nick Garrido kick (Drive: 4 plays, 30 yards, 2:14 LEH 31–10)
- (LEH): 2:06 – Mason Humphrey 17 Yard pass from Hayden Johnson, Nick Garrido kick (Drive: 7 plays, 60 yards, 4:01 LEH 38–10)

Fourth Quarter

- (BUCK): 12:18 – Nate Anderson 10 Yard pass from Ralph Rucker IV, Matt Schearer kick (Drive: 11 plays, 75 yards, 4:48 LEH 38–17)
- (BUCK): 6:09 – TJ Cadden 3 Yard pass from Ralph Rucker IV, Matt Schearer kick (Drive: 11 plays, 86 yards, 3:38 LEH 38–24)
- (LEH): 1:42 – Nick Garrido 23 Yard field goal (Drive: 9 plays, 39 yards, 4:19 LEH 41–24)

| Statistics | LEH | BUCK |
|---|---|---|
| First downs | 25 | 20 |
| Total yards | 494 | 291 |
| Rushing yards | 323 | 80 |
| Passing yards | 171 | 291 |
| Passing: Comp–Att–Int | 16/20/0 | 23/34/1 |
| Time of possession | 32:07 | 27:53 |

| Team | Category | Player | Statistics |
|---|---|---|---|
| Lehigh | Passing | Hayden Johnson | 171 YRD/16 COMP/20 ATP/2 TD/0 INT |
| Lehigh | Rushing | Luke Yoder | 18 CaliforniaR/174 YRD/1 TD |
| Lehigh | Receiving | Geoffrey Jamiel | 8 REC/102 YRD |
| Bucknell | Passing | Ralph Rucker IV | 291 YRD/23 COMP/34 ATP/2 TD/ 1 INT |
| Bucknell | Rushing | Ralph Rucker IV | 13 CaliforniaR/35 YRD/ 1 TD |
| Bucknell | Receiving | Sam Milligan | 5 REC/109 YRD |

Bucknell's parent weekend game, and a revenge game for Lehigh as Bucknell handed the Mountain Hawks their only conference loss last season. On the first play of scrimmage Lehigh's Mekhai Smith intercepted Bucknell's Ralph Rucker IV but only capatalized with a field goal. Bucknell's second possession was a three-and-out, while Lehigh went 55 yards to score taking a 10–0 lead. Bucknell responded with a field goal of their own, while Lehigh put together a 98-yard drive scoring on a one-yard run. Bucknell would finally score to close out the half, making it 24–10 in Lehigh's favor. Lehigh would then score twice, to extend the lead 38–10 before Bucknell mounted a comeback attempt, with Rucker throwing a pair of touchdown passes to cut the lead to 38–24. The Bison attempted an onside kick to set up a potential game-tying drive, however, Lehigh recovered the kick and scored a final field goal to make it 41–24. This was the first time Lehigh has gone 4–0 to start a season since 2013. Lehigh has won 22 of the last 28 games against Bucknell. In this game Lehigh also experimented with a new uniform combination, white jerseys and pants with gold helmets.

=== Penn ===
Penn Quakers (1–0) vs. No. 10 Lehigh Mountain Hawks (4–0) – Game summary

| Quarter | 1 | 2 | 3 | 4 | Total |
|---|---|---|---|---|---|
| Quakers | 7 | 7 | 6 | 10 | 30 |
| No. 10 Mountain Hawks | 13 | 3 | 7 | 21 | 44 |

at Goodman Stadium • Lower Saucon Township, PA

- Date: September 27
- Game time: 12:00 PM EDT
- Game weather: Sunny
- Game attendance: 8,435
- Referee: Todd Boyd
- TV announcers (ESPN+): Marco Socci (play-by-play) and Lance Haynes (analyst)

Game information

First Quarter

- (LEH): 12:08 – Nick Garrido 35 Yard field goal (Drive: 7 plays, 47 yards, 2:45 LEH 3–0)
- (LEH): 6:00 – Matt D'Avino 22 Yard pass from Hayden Johnson, Nich Garrido kick (Drive: 9 plays, 77 yards, 4:39 LEH 10–0)
- (PENN): 4:15 – Bisi Owens 48 Yard pass from Liam O'Brien (Drive: 4 plays, 77 yards, 1:38 LEH 10–7)
- (LEH): 0:42 – Nick Garrido 33 Yard field goal (Drive: 9 plays, 53 yards, 3:27 LEH 13–7)

Second Quarter

- (LEH): 9:29 – Nick Garrido 25 Yard field goal (Drive: 7 plays, 21 yards, 3:18 LEH 16–7)
- (PENN): 5:20 – Liam O'Brien 4 Yard run, Sam Smith kick (Drive: 8 plays, 75 yards, 4:09 LEH 16–14)

Third Quarter

- (PENN): 14:05 – Jared Richardson 6 Yard pass from Liam O'Brien, Sam Smith missed kick (Drive: 2 plays, 40 yards, 0:45 PENN 20–16)
- (LEH): 8:59 – Geoffrey Jamiel 20 Yard run, Nick Garrido kick (Drive: 11 plays, 65 yards, 5:06 LEH 23–20)

Fourth Quarter

- (LEH): 14:52 – Geoffrey Jamiel 35 Yard pass from Hayden Johnson, Nick Garrido kick (Drive: 7 plays, 58 yards, 3:11 LEH 30–20)
- (PENN): 12:48 – Jared Richardson 18 Yard pass from Liam O'Brien, Mason Walters kick (Drive: 6 plays, 65 yards, 2:00 LEH 30–27)
- (LEH): 7:22 – Luke Yoder 1 Yard run, Nick Garrido kick (Drive: 5 plays, 20 yards, 2:47 LEH 37–27)
- (PENN): 4:50 – Mason Walters 32 Yard field goal (Drive: 6 plays, 56 yards, 2:26 LEH 37–30)
- (LEH): 0:58 – Luke Yoder 2 Yard run, Nick Garrido kick (Drive: 9 plays, 75 yards, 3:52 LEH 44–30)

| Statistics | PENN | LEH |
|---|---|---|
| First downs | 19 | 27 |
| Total yards | 345 | 539 |
| Rushing yards | 29 | 299 |
| Passing yards | 316 | 240 |
| Passing: Comp–Att–Int | 28/38/1 | 15/31/0 |
| Time of possession | 23:53 | 36:07 |

| Team | Category | Player | Statistics |
|---|---|---|---|
| Penn | Passing | Liam O'Brien | 316 YRD/28 COMP/37 ATP/3 TD/1 INT |
| Penn | Rushing | Julien Stokes | 5 CaliforniaR/37 YRD |
| Penn | Receiving | Jared Richardson | 12 REC/141 YRD/2 TD |
| Lehigh | Passing | Hayden Johnson | 240 YRD/15 COMP/31 ATP/2 TD |
| Lehigh | Rushing | Luke Yoder | 25 CaliforniaR/173 YRD/2 TD |
| Lehigh | Receiving | Geoffrey Jamiel | 8 REC/132 YRD/1 TD |

Going into the game Penn had not won a match-up against a top 10 ranked team in 72 years while this was also the first time the Mountain Hawks and Quakers would play since 2021 where Penn shut out Lehigh 20–0. Lehigh's opening drive would stall, resulting in a field goal to take an early 3–0 lead. After a Penn three-and-out Lehigh would get the ball back to score before Penn would get on the board with a field goal to make it 10–3. Lehigh's next two drives would both end in field goals, while the Quakers would score on both of theirs, putting them up 20–16, but missing an extra point. On their next drive the Mountain Hawks executed a fake field goal, with Geoffrey Jamiel taking a direct snap on 4th-and-7 to score. Lehigh and Penn then exchanged a pair of passing touchdowns before Lehigh's Tyler Ochojski tipped a pass from Penn's Liam O'Brien setting up an interception with Lehigh scoring 5 plays later to make it 37–27. The Quakers responded with a field goal to make it a one score game, but Lehigh responded by scoring another touchdown, putting the game away late in the fourth quarter. Garrido's 13 points and three made field goals were both career highs while the 539 total yards of offensive was the most in a single game in coach Cahill's career. Lehigh is now 5–0 for the first time since they went 9–0 in 2012.

=== Yale (Yank Townsend Trophy) ===
Yale Bulldogs (2–0) vs. No. 9 Lehigh Mountain Hawks (5–0) – Game summary

| Quarter | 1 | 2 | 3 | 4 | Total |
|---|---|---|---|---|---|
| Bulldogs | 0 | 7 | 6 | 0 | 13 |
| No. 9 Mountain Hawks | 14 | 0 | 10 | 7 | 31 |

at Goodman Stadium • Lower Saucon Township, PA

- Date: October 4
- Game time: 12:00 PM EDT
- Game weather: Sunny • Temperature: 74 °F (23 °C) • Wind: W at 2 miles per hour (3.2 km/h)
- Game attendance: 4,364
- Referee: Anthony Florio
- TV announcers (ESPN+): Marco Socci (play-by-play) and Mike Yadush (analyst)

Game information

First Quarter

- (LEH): 11:14 – Mason Humphrey 27 yard pass from Hayden Johnson, Nick Garrido kick (Drive: 8 plays, 67 yards, 3:40 LEH 7–0)
- (LEH): 2:59 – Luke Yoder 24 yard pass from Hayden Johnson, Nick Garrido kick (Drive: 11 plays, 90 yards, 6:46 LEH 14–0)

Second Quarter

- (YALE): 0:43 – Nico Brown 27 yard pass from Dante Reno, Nick Conforti kick (Drive: 15 plays, 89 yards, 5:32 LEH 14–7)

Third Quarter

- (LEH): 9:47 – Luke Yoder 25 yard run, Nick Garrido kick (Drive: 3 plays, 86 yards, 1:27 LEH 21–7)
- (YALE): 6:18 – Nico Brown 44 yard pass from Dante Reno, Nick Conforti missed PAT (Drive: 8 plays, 75 yards, 3:20 LEH 21–13)
- (LEH): 1:50 – Nick Garrido 24 yard field goal (Drive: 8 plays, 68 yards, 4:28 LEH 24–13)

Fourth Quarter

- (LEH): 2:07 – Hayden Johnson 9 yard run, Nick Garrido kick (Drive: 9 plays, 68 yards, 3:59 LEH 31–13)

| Statistics | YALE | LEH |
|---|---|---|
| First downs | 22 | 22 |
| Total yards | 350 | 399 |
| Rushing yards | 103 | 225 |
| Passing yards | 247 | 174 |
| Passing: Comp–Att–Int | 25/38/2 | 8/15/0 |
| Time of possession | 28:38 | 31:22 |

| Team | Category | Player | Statistics |
|---|---|---|---|
| Yale | Passing | Dante Reno | 247 YRD/25 COMP/38 ATP/2 TD/2 INT |
| Yale | Rushing | Josh Pitsenberger | 18 CaliforniaR/63 YRD |
| Yale | Receiving | Nico Brown | 7 REC/85 YRD/2 TD |
| Lehigh | Passing | Hayden Johnson | 174 YRD/8 COMP/ 15 ATP/2 TD/0 INT |
| Lehigh | Rushing | Luke Yoder | 17 CaliforniaR/ 108 YRD/ 1 TD |
| Lehigh | Receiving | Mason Humphrey | 2 REC/86 YRD/1 TD |

Due to their mutual history of being early adopters of football in America, the Lehigh Mountain Hawks and Yale Bulldogs maintain a rivalry series with the winner receiving the Yank Townsend Trophy, although this rivalry prior to the game was lop-sided in Yale's favor, going 8–2 in the series. Lehigh's Hayden Johnson would struggle to connect with his receivers in the first half, however, was still able to score off two medium touchdown passes, as Yale would only score with 59 seconds left in the second quarter. In their first drive of the third quarter Lehigh would score in just three plays, driving for 86 yards in 1 minute and 30 seconds. Yale would respond, rushing 75 yards in 8 plays, but would miss the extra-point bringing the score to 21–13 with Lehigh responding in turn with a field goal. Yale would attempt to drive to cut the lead to 24–20, however, Yale's Dante Reno would throw an interception to Lehigh's Aiden Singleton which killed an otherwise promising drive, in their next two drives Yale would punt, and then Reno would fumble the ball which was recovered by Lehigh's Tyler Ochjski setting up short field position for Johnson to score a rushing touchdown of his own. This was Lehigh's first win against Yale since 2016, and their first home win against Yale since 2011. After the game Yale's head coach, Tony Reno, praised the Lehigh team, stating: "Credit to a strong Lehigh team. There were opportunities we did not capitalize on and that comes down to discipline and execution." Lehigh's head coach Kevin Cahill worked under Reno as a positional coach from 2012 to 2018 and as Offensive Coordinator from 2020 to 2022.

=== at Columbia ===
No. 7 Lehigh Mountain Hawks (6–0) vs. Columbia Lions (1–2) – Game summary

| Quarter | 1 | 2 | 3 | 4 | Total |
|---|---|---|---|---|---|
| No. 7 Mountain Hawks | 7 | 10 | 14 | 0 | 31 |
| Lions | 0 | 0 | 7 | 0 | 7 |

at Wien Stadium • New York City, NY

- Date: October 11
- Game time: 12:00 PM EDT
- Game weather: Cloudy • Temperature: 64 °F (18 °C) • Wind: E at 7 miles per hour (11 km/h)
- Game attendance: 3,049
- Referee: Tom Zetts
- TV announcers (ESPN+): Lance Medow (play-by-play), Shawn Fitzgerald (analyst) and C.J. Brown (sideline)

Game information

First Quarter

- (LEH): 8:02 – Matt Machalik 4 yard run, Nick Garrido kick (Drive: 12 plays, 77 yards, 5:38 LEH 7–0)

Second Quarter

- (LEH): 12:27 – Luke Yoder 7 yard run, Nick Garrido kick (Drive: 4 plays, 70 yards, 2:21 LEH 14–0)
- (LEH): 0:48 – Nick Garrido 38 yard field goal (Drive: 9 plays, 60 yards, 2:59 LEH 17–0)

Third Quarter

- (LEH): 13:24 – Geoffrey Jamiel 63 yard pass from Hayden Johnson, Nick Garrido kick (Drive: 3 plays, 72 yards, 1:29 LEH 24–0)
- (LEH): 7:50 – Matt Machalik 2 yard run, Nick Garrido kick (Drive: 8 plays, 48 yards, 4:17 LEH 31–0)
- (COLU): 7:00 – Titus Evans 74 yard pass from Xander Menapace, Hugo Merry kick (Drive: 2 plays, 83 yards, 0:43 LEH 31–7)

Fourth Quarter

No scoring plays

| Statistics | LEH | COLU |
|---|---|---|
| First downs | 18 | 9 |
| Total yards | 437 | 228 |
| Rushing yards | 193 | 93 |
| Passing yards | 244 | 189 |
| Passing: Comp–Att–Int | 18/24/0 | 12/27/2 |
| Time of possession | 37:27 | 22:33 |

| Team | Category | Player | Statistics |
|---|---|---|---|
| Lehigh | Passing | Hayden Johnson | 240 YRD/17 COMP/23 ATP/1 TD/0 INT |
| Lehigh | Rushing | Hayden Johnson | 8 CaliforniaR/68 YRD |
| Lehigh | Receiving | Geoffrey Jamiel | 9 REC/182 YRD/1 TD |
| Columbia | Passing | Xander Menapace | 178 YRD/11 COMP/21 ATP/1 TD/2 INT |
| Columbia | Rushing | Xander Menapace | 10 CaliforniaR/23 YRD |
| Columbia | Receiving | Titus Evans | 6 REC/111 YRD/1 TD |

Going into the match-up, Lehigh had beaten the Columbia Lions in their last 11 meetings. On Lehigh's first drive they went 77-yards primarily on the ground, highlighted by a 35-yard rush from Quarterback Hayden Johnson. This would be followed by another Lehigh touchdown and a field goal in the final moments of the second quarter to make it 17–0 at halftime. Lehigh started with the ball in the second half with Geoffrey Jamiel scoring on a 63-yard pass from Johnson, followed by another rushing touchdown on their next drive, extending their lead to 31–0. Columbia would finally answer with a 74-yard touchdown pass from Xander Menapace to Titus Evans which was Menapace's first passing touchdown and Evans' first receiving touchdown to make the final score 31–7. Lehigh would go into their bye week 7–0, their best record since 2012, having beaten three Ivy League opponents in a row. Senior defensive lineman Matt Spatny won Patriot League Defensive Player of the Week after making six tackles, including three for loss and two sacks putting him just 2.5 sacks behind the Lehigh all-time record of 24 from Nick Martucci from the class of 1999.

=== at Fordham ===
No. 7 Lehigh Mountain Hawks (7–0) vs. Fordham Rams (1–6) – Game summary

| Quarter | 1 | 2 | 3 | 4 | Total |
|---|---|---|---|---|---|
| No. 7 Mountain Hawks | 3 | 7 | 14 | 3 | 27 |
| Rams | 0 | 0 | 6 | 0 | 6 |

at Coffey Field • New York City, NY

- Date: October 25
- Game time: 1:00 PM EDT
- Game weather: Sunny • Temperature: 58 °F (14 °C) • Wind: NW at 4 miles per hour (6.4 km/h)
- Game attendance: 4,893
- Referee: Antonio Marcella
- TV announcers (ESPN+): Andrew Bogusch (play-by-play) and Andrew Posadas (analyst)

Game information

First Quarter

- (LEH): 10:57 – Nick Garrido 36 yard field goal (Drive: 8 plays, 49 yards, 3:55 LEH 3–0)

Second Quarter

- (LEH): 4:21 – Hayden Johnson 1 yard run, Nick Garrido kick (Drive: 14 plays, 79 yards, 7:36 LEH 10–0)

Third Quarter

- (LEH): 8:21 – Luke Yoder 7 yard run, Nick Garrido kick (Drive: 8 plays, 80 yards, 3:57 LEH 17–0)
- (LEH): 4:44 – Jaden Green 1 yard run, Nick Garrido kick (Drive: 6 plays, 45 yards, 2:40 LEH 24–0)
- (FOR): 0:15 – Gunnar Smith 1 yard run, Two-Point Pass Conversion Failed (Drive: 12 plays, 26 yards, 4:29 LEH 24–6)

Fourth Quarter

- (LEH): 1:50 – Nick Garrido 22 yard field goal (Drive: 13 plays, 93 yards, 7:31 LEH 27–6)

| Statistics | LEH | FOR |
|---|---|---|
| First downs | 22 | 17 |
| Total yards | 429 | 277 |
| Rushing yards | 158 | 74 |
| Passing yards | 271 | 203 |
| Passing: Comp–Att–Int | 18/27/0 | 17/32/0 |
| Time of possession | 35:19 | 24:41 |

| Team | Category | Player | Statistics |
|---|---|---|---|
| Lehigh | Passing | Hayden Johnson | 267 YRD/17 COMP/26 ATP/0 TD/0 INT |
| Lehigh | Rushing | Luke Yoder | 16 CaliforniaR/79 YRD/1 TD |
| Lehigh | Receiving | Geoffrey Jamiel | 6 REC/85 YRD |
| Fordham | Passing | Gunnar Smith | 203 YRD/17 COMP/32 ATP/0 TD/0 INT |
| Fordham | Rushing | Ricky Parks | 8 CaliforniaR/37 YRD |
| Fordham | Receiving | Jack Betten | 2 REC/87 YRD |

Coming out of the bye Lehigh would return to New York City to play the Fordham Rams. The Mountain Hawk's head coach Kevin Cahill had worked with Fordham's head coach Joe Conlin when the two where positional coaches at Yale from 2013 to 2017. Going into the matchup the Rams had beaten Lehigh in eight of their last eleven games. The game was also Fordham's parent weekend. Lehigh would score first with a field goal, followed by a short stalled Fordham drive, and a 1-yard rushing touchdown for QB Hayden Johnson to make it 10–0 at halftime. Within the first three minutes of the third quarter Lehigh recorded four sacks while also scoring two more times to make it 24–0. With 18 seconds left in the quarter the Rams would finally score, and would fail a two-point conversion as Lehigh would kick another field goal to make the final 27–6. Despite the loss Fordham's linebacker James Conway recorded his 14th tackle for a loss, making him the record holder for not only the franchise, but also the Patriot League and the FCS. Lehigh would have 429 total yards, and keep Fordham to just 74 yards on the ground.

=== Georgetown ===
Georgetown Hoyas (5–3) vs. No. 7 Lehigh Mountain Hawks (8–0) – Game summary

| Quarter | 1 | 2 | 3 | 4 | Total |
|---|---|---|---|---|---|
| Hoyas | 0 | 0 | 0 | 0 | 0 |
| No. 7 Mountain Hawks | 7 | 13 | 7 | 14 | 41 |

at Goodman Stadium • Lower Saucon Township, PA

- Date: November 1
- Game time: 12:00 PM EDT
- Game weather: Sunny
- Game attendance: 4,478
- Referee: Alexander Randolph
- TV announcers (ESPN+): Marco Socci (play-by-play) and Lance Haynes (analyst)

Game information

First Quarter

- (LEH): 9:33 – Jaden Green 15 yard run, Nick Garrido kick (Drive: 10 plays, 58 yards, 4:26 LEH 7–0)

Second Quarter

- (LEH): 10:46 – Luke Yoder 6 yard run, Nick Garrido kick (Drive: 9 plays, 75 yards, 5:03 LEH 14–0)
- (LEH): 7:01 – Luke Yoder 41 yard run (Drive: 1 play, 41 yards, 0:07 LEH 20–0)

Third Quarter

- (LEH): 10:10 – Aidan Singleton 26 yard interception, Connor Poole kick (LEH 27–0)

Fourth Quarter

- (LEH): 12:53 – Geoffrey Jamiel 27 yard pass from Hayden Johnson, Connor Poole kick (Drive: 3 plays, 47 yards, 1:23 LEH 34–0)
- (LEH): 4:21 – Derek Morgan 9 yard run, Canaan Kimball kick (Drive: 10 plays, 67 yards, 6:40 LEH 41–0)

| Statistics | GTWN | LEH |
|---|---|---|
| First downs | 13 | 20 |
| Total yards | 271 | 371 |
| Rushing yards | 90 | 193 |
| Passing yards | 181 | 178 |
| Passing: Comp–Att–Int | 18/32/1 | 14/21/0 |
| Time of possession | 32:03 | 27:57 |

| Team | Category | Player | Statistics |
|---|---|---|---|
| Georgetown | Passing | Dez Thomas II | 168 YRD/14 COMP/25 ATP/0 TD/1 INT |
| Georgetown | Rushing | Dez Thomas II | 14 CaliforniaR/11 YRD |
| Georgetown | Receiving | Jimmy Kibble | 5 REC/99 YRD |
| Lehigh | Passing | Hayden Johnson | 178 YRD/14 COMP/21 ATP/1 TD/0 INT |
| Lehigh | Rushing | Luke Yoder | 8 CaliforniaR/62 YRD/2 TD |
| Lehigh | Receiving | Geoffrey Jamiel | 5 REC/72 YRD/1 TD |

Lehigh's faced the Georgetown Hoyas for the annual 'Hawk-O-Ween' game where fans where encouraged to dress up in their Halloween costumes to the game. Lehigh opened scoring with a 15-yard rush from Jayden Green to take an early lead and never let go, they expanded their lead with a six-yard running touchdown from Luke Yoder. After Georgetown's offense failed to score on their next drive Lehigh would return the ensuing punt for 33 yards to score yet again off a one-play 41-yard rushing drive from Yoder to make it 20–0 at halftime after their extra-point was blocked and their kicker, Nich Garrido, was injured. Early in the third quarter Lehigh junior defensive-back Aidan Singleton intercepted a pass for a touchdown as a new kicker was brought in, Connor Poole, to make the extra point. Georgetown almost scored off a 24-yard pass lay, however, as Georgetown's Hassan Mahasin was about to cross the end zone the ball was punched out of his hands and out of the end zone, resulting in a touch-back. Lehigh would score one more time with first-year Quarterback Derek Morgan rushing for a nine-yard score. This was the first time that Lehigh had shut out an opponent since October 10, 2009, when they also beat the Hoyas 27–0. Lehigh is now 22–2 against Georgetown, and since the Hoyas joined the Patriot League in 2001 Lehigh has recorded four shutouts against them in 2002, 2007, 2009 and now 2025. The 41–0 final score was also the largest Lehigh margin of victory since their 2007 45–0 game against the Hoyas. At halftime Lehigh honored four members of their women's wrestling team who competed at the U20 World Wrestling Championships winning two silver medals.

=== Holy Cross ===
Holy Cross Crusaders (1–8) vs. No. 4 Lehigh Mountain Hawks (9–0) – Game summary

| Quarter | 1 | 2 | 3 | 4 | Total |
|---|---|---|---|---|---|
| Crusaders | 0 | 3 | 0 | 0 | 3 |
| No. 4 Mountain Hawks | 7 | 7 | 17 | 7 | 38 |

at Goodman Stadium • Lower Saucon Township, PA

- Date: November 8
- Game time: 12:00 PM EDT
- TV announcers (ESPN+): Marco Socci (play-by-play) and Mike Yadush (analyst)

Game information

First Quarter

- (LEH): 10:58 – Mason Humphrey 29 yard pass from Hayden Johnson, Connor Poole kick (Drive: 6 plays, 63 yards, 2:34 LEH 7–0)

Second Quarter

- (HC): 5:14 – Luis Palenzuela 32 yard field goal (Drive: 8 plays, 66 yards, 5:14 LEH 7–3)
- (LEH): 2:33 – Luke Yoder 42 yard run, Conner Poole kick (Drive: 6 plays, 75 yards, 2:41 LEH 14–3)

Third Quarter

- (LEH): 11:38 – Conner Poole 32 yard field goal (Drive: 6 plays, 61 yards, 3:22 LEH 17–3)
- (LEH): 10:06 – Geoffrey Jamiel 45 yard pass from Hayden Johnson, Conner Poole kick (Drive: 1 play, 40 yards, 0:11 LEH 24–3)
- (LEH): 1:35 – Luke Yoder 1 yard run, Conner Poole kick (Drive: 5 plays, 70 yards, 2:26 'LEH 31–3)

Fourth Quarter

- (LEH): 14:07 – Geoffrey Jamiel 11 yard pass from Hayden Johnson, Conner Poole kick (Drive: 2 plays, 25 yards, 0:46 LEH 38–3)

| Statistics | HC | LEH |
|---|---|---|
| First downs | 9 | 23 |
| Total yards | 215 | 518 |
| Rushing yards | 20 | 344 |
| Passing yards | 195 | 174 |
| Passing: Comp–Att–Int | 19/34/0 | 8/18/2 |
| Time of possession | 27:56 | 32:04 |

| Team | Category | Player | Statistics |
|---|---|---|---|
| Holy Cross | Passing | Dominic Campanile | 31 ATP/19 COMP/195 YRD/0 TD/0 INT |
| Holy Cross | Rushing | Jayden Clerveaux | 8 CaliforniaR/15 YRD/0 TD |
| Holy Cross | Receiving | Joseph Williams | 3 REC/55 YRD/0 TD |
| Lehigh | Passing | Hayden Johnson | 18 ATP/8 COMP/ 174 YRD/3 TD/2 INT |
| Lehigh | Rushing | Luke Yoder | 17 CaliforniaR/142 YRD/2 TD |
| Lehigh | Receiving | Geoffrey Jamiel | 3 REC/66 YRD/2 TD |

At the start of the season the Lehigh-Holy Cross match-up was billed as a marquee event, as the Mountain Hawks where favorites to repeat their Patriot League championship, while the Crusaders, who'd won six in a row, where picked to finish third after the two where crowned co-champions in 2024. On Lehigh's opening drive Hayden Johnson went 63-yard to score, topped off by a 29-yard receiving touchdown by Mason Humphrey. On their second drive the Mountain Hawks would throw an interception, which Holy Cross used to kick a field goal to cut the lead 7–3. This was his first interception in four weeks. Lehigh went three-and-out on their next three drives before Luke Yoder broke through the secondary to rush for a 42-yard score. After forcing a three-and-out on the Crusaders the Mountain Hawks orchestrated a two-minute drill getting into the redzone however, Johnson would throw a second interception. Lehigh opened both their drives of the second half off scores, kicking a field foal and a 45-yard receiving touchdown from Geoffrey Jamiel. Holy Cross would be held to just 46 yards of total offense in the second half, as Lehigh scored again early in the fourth quarter for a final score of 38–3. This was the first time Lehigh has gone on a 10-game winning streak since 2011. Lehigh players began to attribute their winning streak to their 'victory dogs' post-game celebrations, where the team are served hot-dogs by Lehigh alumni, averaging around 200 hotdogs per-game.

=== at Colgate ===
No. 4 Lehigh Mountain Hawks (10–0) vs. Colgate Raiders (4–6) – Game summary

| Quarter | 1 | 2 | 3 | 4 | Total |
|---|---|---|---|---|---|
| No. 4 Mountain Hawks | 10 | 10 | 0 | 7 | 27 |
| Raiders | 0 | 0 | 7 | 0 | 7 |

at Crown Field at Andy Kerr Stadium • Hamilton, NY

- Date: November 15
- Game time: 1:00 PM EDT
- TV: ESPN+

Game information

First Quarter

- (LEH): 8:05 - Aaron Crossley 2 yard run, John Zipf kick (Drive: 11 plays 53 yards, 6:05 LEH 7-0)
- (LEH): 3:33 - Connor Poole 32 yard field goal (Drive: 7 plays, 58 yards, 3:04 LEH 10-0)

Second Quarter

- (LEH): 10:23 - Connor Poole 30 yard field goal (Drive: 11 plays, 51 yards, 6:38 LEH 13-0)
- (LEH): 5:11 - Geoffrey Jamiel 64 yard pass from Hayden Johnson, John Zipf kick (Drive: 2 plays, 73 yards, 0:51 LEH 20-0)
- (COLG): 0:06 - Matt Fogler 28 yard pass from Jake Stearney, Luke Vogeler kick, (Drive: 6 plays, 55 yards, 0:42 LEH 20-7)

Third Quarter
Fourth Quarter

- (LEH): 10:04 - Jaden Green 28 yard run, John Zipf kick, (Drive: 6 plays, 52 yards, 3:21 LEH 27-7)

| Statistics | LEH | COLG |
|---|---|---|
| First downs | 16 | 12 |
| Total yards | 393 | 222 |
| Rushing yards | 134 | 60 |
| Passing yards | 259 | 162 |
| Passing: Comp–Att–Int | 17/25/0 | 17/30/1 |
| Time of possession | 37:08 | 22:52 |

| Team | Category | Player | Statistics |
|---|---|---|---|
| Lehigh | Passing | Hayden Johnson | 25 ATP/17COMP/259 YRD/0 INT/1 TD |
| Lehigh | Rushing | Jaden Green | 9 CaliforniaR/54 YRD/1 TD |
| Lehigh | Receiving | Geoffrey Jamiel | 9REC/138 YRD/1 TD |
| Colgate | Passing | Jake Stearney | 28 ATP/15 COMP/151 YRD/1 INT/1 TD |
| Colgate | Rushing | Zach Osborne | 5 CaliforniaR/25 YRD/0 TD |
| Colgate | Receiving | Matt Fogler | 3 REC/83 YRD/1 TD |

Going to the game at Colgate, one of Lehigh's busses would break down on I-81. Despite this, on their first drive sophomore running back Aaron Crossley would score on a two-yard rush followed by two field goals from punter/kicker Connor Poole while point-after attempts were made by John Zipf. After the second field goal Colgate put up a long drive of their own, ending with a 45-yard field goal attempted which kicker Luke Vogeler missed, as Lehigh scored yet again on a 64-yard touchdown pass to Geoffrey Jamiel to make it 20–0. The Raiders finally scored with a 28-yard touchdown pass from Jake Stearney to Matt Fogler, this would be their only points on the board as on their next and final promising drive where Stearney completed a 47-yard pass, the longest of his career, he would be picked off in the end-zone by Lehigh's Jackson Dowd. Lehigh would score one more time with a 31-yard pass to Mason Humphrey, while Colgate was able to get into range for another long 48 yard field-foal, which Vogeler also missed. After an hour long rain delay the game would be called off with 3:54 in the fourth quarter due to lightning. With the win Lehigh is one win away from winning the Patriot League for the second straight year in a row as Lafayette has also remained undefeated in conference games.

=== at Lafayette (The Rivalry) ===
No. 4 Lehigh Mountain Hawks (11–0) vs. Lafayette Leopards (8–3) – Game summary

| Quarter | 1 | 2 | 3 | 4 | Total |
|---|---|---|---|---|---|
| No. 4 Mountain Hawks | 7 | 7 | 14 | 14 | 42 |
| Leopards | 7 | 10 | 7 | 8 | 32 |

at Fisher Stadium • Easton, PA

- Date: November 22
- Game time: 12:30 PM EST
- Game weather: Sunny • Temperature: 48 °F (9 °C) • Wind: E at 6 miles per hour (9.7 km/h)
- Game attendance: 13,367
- Referee: Tom Zwtts
- TV announcers (ESPN+): Gary Laubach (play-by-play), Mike Joseph (analyst) and Meghan Capanna (sideline)

Game information

First Quarter

- (LAF): 8:00 - Kente Edwards 1 yard run, Jack Simonetta kick (Drive: 14 plays, 75 yards, 7:00 LAF 7-0)
- (LEH): 4:46 - Luke Yoder 29 yard run, Connor Poole kick (Drive: 7 plays, 65 yards, 3:14 TIED 7-7

Second Quarter

- (LAF): 14:21 - Dean DeNobile 2 yard run, Jack Simonetta kick (Drive: 14 plays, 80 yards, 5:25 LAF 14-7)
- (LEH): 7:32 - Mason Humphrey 77 yard pass from Hayden Johnson, Connor Poole kick (Drive: 2 plays, 89 yards, 0:44 TIED 14-14)
- (LAF): 1:03 - Jack Simonetta 21 yard field goal (Drive: 14 plays, 52 yards, 6:29 LAF 17-14)

Third Quarter

- (LEH): 14:42 - Luke Yoder 80 yard run, Connor Poole kick (Drive: 1 play, 80 yards, 0:18 LEH 21-17)
- (LAF): 2:46 - Kente Edwards 1 yard run, Jack Simonetta kick (Drive: 13 plays, 97 yards, 5:59 LAF 24-21)
- (LEH): 0:48 - Luke Yoder 3 yard run, Connor Poole kick (Drive: 4 plays, 73 yards, 1:58 LEH 28-24)

Fourth Quarter

- (LEH): 10:20 - Luke Yoder 6 yard run, Connor Poole kick (Drive 7 plays, 47 yards, 3:24 LEH 35-24)
- (LAF): 7:14 - Kente Edwards 4 yard run, Jason Penza pass to Mason Kuehner for two-point conversion (Drive: 8 plays, 75 yards, 3:06 LEH 35-32)
- (LEH): 1:53 - Hayden Johnson 1 yard run, Connor Poole kick (Drive: 10 plays, 75 yards, 5:21 LEH 42-32)

| Statistics | LEH | LAF |
|---|---|---|
| First downs | 18 | 27 |
| Total yards | 479 | 424 |
| Rushing yards | 320 | 149 |
| Passing yards | 159 | 275 |
| Passing: Comp–Att–Int | 11/16/1 | 26/38/1 |
| Time of possession | 24:22 | 35:38 |

| Team | Category | Player | Statistics |
|---|---|---|---|
| Lehigh | Passing | Hayden Johnson | 16 ATP/11 COMP/159 YRD/1 INT/1 TD |
| Lehigh | Rushing | Luke Yoder | 19 CaliforniaR/234 YRD/4 TD |
| Lehigh | Receiving | Mason Humphrey | 2 REC/83 YRD/1 TD |
| Lafayette | Passing | Dean DeNobile | 37 ATP/26 COMP/275 YRD/0 INT/0 TD |
| Lafayette | Rushing | Kente Edwards | 41 CaliforniaR/157 YRD/3 TD |
| Lafayette | Receiving | Mason Kuehner | 11 REC/99 YRD/0 TD |

Rivalry week, with the long-standing tradition of students at both schools putting up white bedsheets with disparaging messages painted on them targeting the other school, such as "LAF Sunk the Edmund Fitzgerald" or "LAF makes me drink alone" or "LAF has soft hands." The Morning Call also published an op-ed calling for the 161st meeting of The Rivalry to be on College GameDay noting the long-running history of the game, and celebrating the goal-post tear down of last season. Since both Lehigh and Lafyatte are undefeated in conference games, the outcome of the rivalry meeting determined who would be the Patriot League champions and advance to the FCS playoffs. This was also the first game rivalry game that Lehigh went into undefeated since 2001. Both teams scored on their opening possession, while the Leopards scored on their second drive while forcing a Lehigh punt, however, Hayden Johnson would connect with Mason Humphrey for a 77-yard touchdown pass to tie the game 14–14 before Lafayette kicked a field goal on a two-minute drill, giving Lehigh their first point deficit heading into halftime this season as their attempt to answer ended in an interception by Lafayette's Avery Jones. On the opening play of the second half the Mountain Hawk's Luke Yoder rushed 80-yards to reverse this lead, while the two teams running backs would exchange touchdowns to make it 28–24. Lafayette would attempt to go for it on 4th down but Lehigh's defense would get a crucial stop setting up good field position for another Yoder touchdown extending the lead 35–24. Lafayette would score, and complete a two-point conversion to get them within a field-goal, however, Johnson would score on a 1-yard QB sneak to ice the game 42–32. Lehigh's running back Luke Yoder would win the game's MVP award, for rushing for 234 yards and 4 touchdowns. With their win Lehigh would be seeded #5 in the FCS playoffs and will have a first-round bye, hosting the winner of the Villanova-Harvard game at Goodman stadium.

=== No. 9 Villanova (NCAA Division I Second Round) ===
2025 NCAA Division I FCS Playoffs Second Round
No. 9 (12) Villanova Wildcats (10–2) at No. 4 (5) Lehigh Mountain Hawks (12–0) – Game summary

| Quarter | 1 | 2 | 3 | 4 | Total |
|---|---|---|---|---|---|
| No. 9 (12) Wildcats | 0 | 0 | 7 | 7 | 14 |
| No. 4 (5) Mountain Hawks | 0 | 0 | 7 | 0 | 7 |

at Goodman Stadium • Lower Saucon Township, PA

- Date: December 6
- Game time: 12:00 PM EDT
- Game weather: Sunny
- Game attendance: 8,848
- Referee: Bruce Austin
- TV: ESPN+

Game information

First quarter

- No scoring plays.

Second quarter

- No scoring plays.

Third quarter

- LEH (12:29) - Aaron Crossley 5 yard run, Conner Poole kick (Drive: 5 plays, 75 yards, 2:25 LEH 7-0)
- VILL (2:29) - Ja'briel Mace 1 yard run, Jack Barnum kick (Drive: 6 plays, 59 yards, 3:10 TIED 7-7)

Fourth quarter

- VILL (3:02) -Braden Reed 28 yeard pass from Pat McQuaide, Jack Barnum kick (Drive: 3 plays, 51 yards, 1:24 VILL 14-7)

| Statistics | VILL | LEH |
|---|---|---|
| First downs | 14 | 21 |
| Plays–yards | 55–235 | 62–339 |
| Rushes–yards | 27–27 | 42–178 |
| Passing yards | 208 | 161 |
| Passing: Comp–Att–Int | 18–28–0 | 12–20–0 |
| Turnovers | 0 | 2 |
| Time of possession | 26:42 | 33:18 |

| Team | Category | Player | Statistics |
|---|---|---|---|
| Villanova | Passing | Pat McQuaide | 18/28, 208 yards, TD |
| Villanova | Rushing | Ja'briel Mace | 11 carries, 48 yards, TD |
| Villanova | Receiving | Luke Colella | 8 receptions, 71 yards |
| Lehigh | Passing | Hayden Johnson | 12/20, 161 yards |
| Lehigh | Rushing | Luke Yoder | 11 carries, 80 yards |
| Lehigh | Receiving | Matt D'Avino | 3 receptions, 57 yards |

Villanova entered the playoffs as the 12 seed, having defeated Harvard in the first round while Lehigh had a bye. Going into the game the two teams had met 19 times prior, with Villanova winning the last 11 meetings in a row with a series record of 14–5. This was also the first playoff game hosted at Goodman stadium since 2001. The first quarter was a stalemate, that saw Lehigh opt for a field-goal-fake instead of taking the three points which fell short of the goal-line. The second quarter was also scoreless. Lehigh would score on their opening drive of the second half, however, on their next drive running back Luke Yoder fumbled the ball which was reocvered by Villanova's Josh Oluremi, with their offense capitalizing on the short field position to make it 7-7. Lehigh had another field-goal opportunity on the next drive, however, Connor Poole missed the 26-yard attempt. Villanova's next drive also resulted in a missed 35-yard attempt by their kicker Jack Barnum to keep the game tied. Villanova would score off a 28-yard pass from McQuaide to Reed to take the lead 14–7. On Lehigh's final drive with a chance to tie the game the Mountain Hawks drove 54 years, but Lehigh would lose the ball on first-and-10 at the Villanova 14 due to a strip-sack by the Wildcat's Obinna Nwobodo recovered by Shane Hartzell. Next season Villanova and Lehigh will play in the regular season, as Villanova joins the Patriot League.

== Postseason ==
There was intense speculation that Lehigh's coach, Kevin Cahill, would be poached to a bigger FBS organization after leading the Mountain Hawks to back-to-back Patriot League championships, however, Cahill instead signed a multi-year contract extension with Lehigh. This came shortly after the announcement of a private endowment by the Vandergrift family of $2.5 million to pay for the head coach's salary, with the position being formally renamed the "Vandergrift Family Head Football Coach." Cahill won the 2025 Eddie Robinson Award given to the top head coach in the FCS, being just the second Lehigh coach winning the honor besides Pete Lembo in 2001. Cahill was also recogonized as the Patriot League and ECAC coach of the year, and was named the Region 1 coach of the year by the AFCA. Lehigh also held a fund-raiser for the football team, with the school promising to invest $1 million in the team if donors could raise $500k, with they did, raising $1 million with 20 days left in the fundraiser, which will be combined with the existing $5 million endowment for the head coach and the $2.5 million from the Vandergrifts will go towards paying Cahill. Despite all of this, on February 23, 2026, Cahill announced that he would be leaving Lehigh to take the head coaching job at Yale University with defensive coordinator Rich Nagy named to succeed him.

Seven Mountain Hawks would be named to the Associated Press FCS all-American team; offensive lineman Langston Jones and linebacker Tyler Ochojski as second-team and runningback Luke Yoder, offensive lineman Aidan Palmer, defensive lineman Matt Spatny, defensive lineman TJ Burke and safety Mekhai Smith as honorable mentions. Ochojski was the first defensive player from the Patriot League to be named to the all-American team in 16 years, ending the year with 11 sacks and 13 tackles for losses with 60 tackles overall while also winning 2 Patriot League defensive player of the week honors in the regular season. Jones meanwhile started all 48 games over the last 4 seasons, 2 of which for left guard, contributing to Lehigh's rushing attack and being the fourth best team nationally in sacks allowed at 0.69. Jones, Ochojski, Yoder, Burke, and Smith where also named to the FCS central region's all-American team, alongside wide-receiver Geoffrey Jamiel. Jones was also added as a second-team all-American by the American Football Coaches Association, being the first Lehigh player to win that award since 2017, and just the seventh to make the list since 2000.

== Ranking movements ==
Ranking movements Legend: ██ Increase in ranking ██ Decrease in ranking
| | Week | | | | | | | | | | | | | | |
| Poll | Pre | 1 | 2 | 3 | 4 | 5 | 6 | 7 | 8 | 9 | 10 | 11 | 12 | 13 | Final |
|---|---|---|---|---|---|---|---|---|---|---|---|---|---|---|---|
| STATS FCS | 14 | 11 | 10 | 10 | 10 | 9 | 7 | 7 | 7 | 7 | 4 | 4 | 4 | 4 | 10 |
| Coaches | 15 | 13 | 12 | 10 | 9 | 8 | 8 | 7 | 7 | 7 | 4 | 4 | 4 | 3 | 9 |
