= 2025 Bucknell Bison football team =

American college football season

2025 Bucknell Bison football
- Conference: Patriot League
- Record: 5–7 (2–5 Patriot)
- Head coach: Dave Cecchini (7th season)
- Offensive coordinator: Drew Folmar (1st season)
- Defensive coordinator: Chris Bowers (4th season)
- Home stadium: Christy Mathewson–Memorial Stadium

2025 Patriot League football standings
	Conf.			Overall
Team	W		L	W		L
No. 10 Lehigh $^	7	–	0	12	–	1
Lafayette	6	–	1	8	–	4
Holy Cross	3	–	4	3	–	9
Richmond	3	–	4	7	–	5
Georgetown	3	–	4	6	–	6
Colgate	3	–	4	5	–	7
Bucknell	2	–	5	5	–	7
Fordham	1	–	6	1	–	11
$ – Conference champion; ^ – FCS playoff participant; Rankings from STATS Poll

The 2025 Bucknell Bison football team represented Bucknell University as a member of the Patriot League during the 2025 NCAA Division I FCS football season. The Bison are led by seventh-year head coach Dave Cecchini and play their home games at Christy Mathewson–Memorial Stadium in Lewisburg, Pennsylvania.

== Schedule ==
Date	Time	Opponent	Site	TV	Result	Attendance
August 30	3:30 p.m.	at Air Force*	Falcon Stadium; Colorado Springs, CO	CBSSN	L 13–49	30,207
September 6	1:00 p.m.	at Marist*	Tenney Stadium at Leonidoff Field; Poughkeepsie, NY	ESPN+	W 34–23	1,907
September 13	3:30 p.m.	VMI*	Christy Mathewson–Memorial Stadium; Lewisburg, PA	ESPN+	W 35–28	2,058
September 20	6:00 p.m.	No. 10 Lehigh	Christy Mathewson–Memorial Stadium; Lewisburg, PA	ESPN+	L 24–41	3,143
September 27	6:00 p.m.	Saint Francis (PA)*	Christy Mathewson–Memorial Stadium; Lewisburg, PA	ESPN+	W 30–23	887
October 4	12:00 p.m.	Richmond^{†}	Christy Mathewson–Memorial Stadium; Lewisburg, PA	ESPN+	W 33–28	1,454
October 11	12:30 p.m.	at Lafayette	Fisher Stadium; Easton, PA	ESPN+	L 24–62	3,873
October 18	1:00 p.m.	at Cornell*	Schoellkopf Field; Ithaca, NY	ESPN+	L 20–30	4,205
October 25	12:00 p.m.	Georgetown	Christy Mathewson–Memorial Stadium; Lewisburg, PA	ESPN+	L 24–31	778
November 8	1:00 p.m.	at Fordham	Coffey Field; Bronx, NY	ESPN+	W 37–19	2,235
November 15	12:00 p.m.	Holy Cross	Christy Mathewson–Memorial Stadium; Lewisburg, PA	ESPN+	L 20–37	913
November 22	1:00 p.m.	at Colgate	Crown Field at Andy Kerr Stadium; Hamilton, NY	ESPN+	L 19–38	1,170
*Non-conference game; ^{†}Homecoming; Rankings from STATS Poll released prior to the game; All times are in Eastern time

== Game summaries ==
=== at Air Force (FBS) ===
Bucknell Bison (0–0) at Air Force Falcons (FBS) (0–0) – Game summary

Quarter	1	2	3	4	Total
Bison	0	7	3	3	13
Falcons (FBS)	14	14	14	7	49

at Falcon Stadium • Air Force Academy, Colorado

- Date: August 30
- Game time: 1:30 p.m. MDT
- Game weather: Sunny
- Game attendance: 30,207
- Referee: Gary Reed
- TV announcers (CBSSN): Jordan Kent and Ben DiNucci
- Box score, Recap

Game information

First quarter

- AFA – Quin Smith 40-yard pass from Josh Johnson (Jacob Medina kick), 6:22. Falcons 7–0. Drive: 6 plays, 80 yards, 2:47.
- AFA – Cade Harris 9-yard run (Jacob Medina kick), 2:28. Falcons 14–0. Drive: 5 plays, 61 yards, 2:25.

Second quarter

- BUCK – Sam Milligan 12-yard pass from Ralph Rucker IV (Matt Schearer kick), 12:54. Falcons 14–7. Drive: 11 plays, 75 yards, 4:34.
- AFA – Dylan Carson 2-yard run (Jacob Medina kick), 7:14. Falcons 21–7. Drive: 11 plays, 75 yards, 5:40.;
- AFA – Cade Harris 62-yard pass from Josh Johnson (Jacob Medina kick), 4:41. Falcons 28–7. Drive: 1 play, 62 yards, 0:09.

Third quarter

- AFA – Korey Johnson 0-yard fumble return (Jacob Medina kick), 13:04. Falcons 35–7.
- AFA – Cade Harris 8-yard run (Jacob Medina kick), 11:34. Falcons 42–7. Drive: 1 play, 8 yards, 0:06.
- BUCK – Matt Schearer 37-yard field goal, 5:49. Falcons 42–10. Drive: 12 plays, 55 yards, 5:45.

Fourth quarter

- AFA – Maguire Martin 1-yard run (Reagan Tubbs kick), 6:24. Falcons 49–10. Drive: 17 plays, 75 yards, 14:25.
- BUCK – Matt Schearer 39-yard field goal, 0:44. Falcons 49–13. Drive: 13 plays, 53 yards, 5:40.

Statistics	BUCK	AFA
First downs	18	23
Plays–yards	62–266	60–429
Rushes–yards	38–97	51–270
Passing yards	169	159
Passing: Comp–Att–Int	16–24–1	6–9–0
Turnovers	2	0
Time of possession	28:22	31:38

Team	Category	Player	Statistics
Bucknell	Passing	Ralph Rucker IV	10/18, 126 yards, TD, INT
Bucknell	Rushing	Tariq Thomas	18 carries, 80 yards
Bucknell	Receiving	Sam Milligan	2 receptions, 41 yards, TD
Air Force	Passing	Josh Johnson	4/7, 112 yards, 2 TD
Air Force	Rushing	Cade Harris	8 carries, 66 yards, 2 TD
Air Force	Receiving	Cade Harris	3 receptions, 83 yards, TD

=== at Marist ===
Bucknell Bison (0-1) at Marist Red Foxes (1-0) – Game summary

Quarter	1	2	3	4	Total
Bison	10	7	3	14	34
Red Foxes	0	14	3	6	23

at Leonidoff Field • Poughkeepsie, NY

- Date: September 6
- Game time: 1:00 PM EDT
- Game weather: Cloudy • Temperature: 80 °F (27 °C) • Wind: SW at 8 miles per hour (13 km/h)
- Game attendance: 1,907
- Referee: Edward Roos
- TV announcers (ESPN+): Geoff Brault (play-by-play), Steve Eggink (analyst), William Rosen (sideline)

Statistics	BUCK	MRST
First downs		
Total yards		
Rushing yards		
Passing yards		
Passing: Comp–Att–Int		
Time of possession		

Team	Category	Player	Statistics
Bucknell	Passing		
Bucknell	Rushing		
Bucknell	Receiving		
Marist	Passing		
Marist	Rushing		
Marist	Receiving		

=== VMI ===
VMI Keydets (1-1) vs. Bucknell Bison (1-1) – Game summary

Quarter	1	2	3	4	Total
Keydets	7	0	7	14	28
Bison	7	14	7	7	35

at Christy Mathewson–Memorial Stadium • Lewisburg, PA

- Date: September 13
- Game time: 3:30 PM EDT
- Game weather: Sunny
- Game attendance: 2,058
- Referee: Eric Lewis
- TV announcers (ESPN+): Doug Birdsong (play-by-play) and Charlie Fisher (analyst)

Game information

First Quarter

- (8:46) BUC – Sam Milligan 45-yard pass from Ralph Rucker IV, Matt Schearer kick (Drive: 1 play, 45 yards, 0:08; Bucknell 7–0)
- (3:16) VMI – Owen Sweeney 18-yard pass from Collin Shannon, Ben Shrewsbury kick (Drive: 12 plays, 69 yards, 5:23; Tied 7–7)

Second Quarter

- (4:58) BUC – Sam Milligan 18-yard pass from Ralph Rucker IV, Matt Schearer kick (Drive: 15 plays, 94 yards, 8:03; Bucknell 14–7)
- (0:15) BUC – Sam Milligan 34-yard pass from Ralph Rucker IV, Matt Schearer kick (Drive: 10 plays, 85 yards, 2:54; Bucknell 21–7)

Third Quarter

- (8:37) VMI – Noah Grevious 73-yard pass from Collin Shannon, Ben Shrewsbury kick (Drive: 3 plays, 77 yards, 1:29; Bucknell 21–14)
- (2:30) BUC – TJ Cadden 59-yard pass from Ralph Rucker IV, Matt Schearer kick (Drive: 3 plays, 63 yards, 1:13; Bucknell 28–14)

Fourth Quarter

- (14:54) VMI – Nana Utsey 3-yard run, Ben Shrewsbury kick (Drive: 6 plays, 70 yards, 2:29; Bucknell 28–21)
- (5:26) VMI – Owen Sweeney 14-yard pass from Collin Shannon, Ben Shrewsbury kick (Drive: 7 plays, 67 yards, 3:30; Tied 28–28)
- (1:49) BUC – Sam Milligan 37-yard pass from Ralph Rucker IV, Matt Schearer kick (Drive: 8 plays, 88 yards, 3:37; Bucknell 35–28)

Statistics	VMI	BUCK
First downs	18	18
Total yards	421	476
Rushing yards	59	71
Passing yards	362	405
Passing: Comp–Att–Int	21–38–0	21–28–1
Time of possession	30:28	29:32

Team	Category	Player	Statistics
VMI	Passing	Collin Shannon	21/38, 362 yards, 3 TD
VMI	Rushing	Leo Boehling	19 carries, 66 yards
VMI	Receiving	Noah Grevious	6 receptions, 186 yards, TD
Bucknell	Passing	Ralph Rucker IV	21/28, 405 yards, 5 TD, INT
Bucknell	Rushing	Tariq Thomas	14 carries, 25 yards
Bucknell	Receiving	Sam Milligan	7 receptions, 192 yards, 4 TD

=== No. 10 Lehigh ===
No. 10 Lehigh Mountain Hawks (3-0) vs. Bucknell Bison (2-1) – Game summary

Quarter	1	2	3	4	Total
No. 10 Mountain Hawks	10	7	21	3	41
Bison	3	7	0	14	24

at Christy Mathewson–Memorial Stadium • Lewisburg, PA

- Date: September 20
- Game time: 6:00 PM EDT
- Game weather: Sunny
- Game attendance: 3,143
- Referee: Todd Bowman
- TV announcers (ESPN+): Doug Birdsong (play-by-play) and Charlie Fisher (analyst)

Game information

First Quarter

- (LEH): 11:44 - Nick Garrido 24 Yard field goal (Drive: 7 plays, 28 yards, 3:04 LEH 3-0)
- (LEH): 7:03 - Jaden Green 12 Yard rush, Nick Garrido kick (Drive: 5 plays, 55 yards, 2:37 LEH 10-0)
- (BUCK): 3:49 - Matt Schearer 29 Yard field goal (Drive: 6 plays, 73 yards, 3:08 LEH 10-3)

Second Quarter

- (LEH): 10:08 - Luke Yoder 1 Yard rush, Nick Garrido kick (Drive: 11 plays, 98 yards, 5:39 LEH 17-3)
- (BUCK): 4:29 - Ralph Rucker IV 5 Yard rush, Matt Schearer kick (Drive: 12 plays, 85 yards, 5:39 LEH 17-10)

Third Quarter

- (LEH): 11:54 - Jaden Green 23 Yard rush, Nick Garrido kick (Drive: 4 plays, 65 yards, 3:06 LEH 24-10)
- (LEH): 7:30 - Jaden Green 6 Yard rush, Nick Garrido kick (Drive: 4 plays, 30 yards, 2:14 LEH 31-10)
- (LEH): 2:06 - Mason Humphrey 17 Yard pass from Hayden Johnson, Nick Garrido kick (Drive: 7 plays, 60 yards, 4:01 LEH 38-10)

Fourth Quarter

- (BUCK): 12:18 - Nate Anderson 10 Yard pass from Ralph Rucker IV, Matt Schearer kick (Drive: 11 plays, 75 yards, 4:48 LEH 38-17)
- (BUCK): 6:09 - TJ Cadden 3 Yard pass from Ralph Rucker IV, Matt Schearer kick (Drive: 11 plays, 86 yards, 3:38 LEH 38-24)
- (LEH): 1:42 - Nick Garrido 23 Yard field goal (Drive: 9 plays, 39 yards, 4:19 LEH 41-24)

Statistics	LEH	BUCK
First downs	25	20
Total yards	494	291
Rushing yards	323	80
Passing yards	171	291
Passing: Comp–Att–Int	16–20–0	23–34–1
Time of possession	32:07	27:53

Team	Category	Player	Statistics
Lehigh	Passing	Hayden Johnson	16/20, 171 yards, 2 TD
Lehigh	Rushing	Luke Yoder	18 carries, 174 yards, TD
Lehigh	Receiving	Geoffrey Jamiel	8 receptions, 102 yards
Bucknell	Passing	Ralph Rucker IV	23/34, 291 yards, 2 TD, INT
Bucknell	Rushing	Ralph Rucker IV	13 carries, 35 yards, TD
Bucknell	Receiving	Sam Milligan	5 receptions, 109 yards

=== Saint Francis (PA) ===
Saint Francis Red Flash (0-4) vs. Bucknell Bison (2-2) – Game summary

Quarter	1	2	3	4	Total
Red Flash	0	14	3	6	23
Bison	7	3	12	8	30

at Christy Mathewson–Memorial Stadium • Lewisburg, PA

- Date: September 27
- Game time: 6:00 PM EDT
- Game weather: Cloudy
- Game attendance: 887
- Referee: Anthony Florio
- TV announcers (ESPN+): Doug Birdsong (play-by-play) and Charle Fisher (analyst)

Statistics	SFPA	BUCK
First downs		
Total yards		
Rushing yards		
Passing yards		
Passing: Comp–Att–Int		
Time of possession		

Team	Category	Player	Statistics
Saint Francis (PA)	Passing		
Saint Francis (PA)	Rushing		
Saint Francis (PA)	Receiving		
Bucknell	Passing		
Bucknell	Rushing		
Bucknell	Receiving		

=== Richmond ===
Richmond Spiders (3-2) vs. Bucknell Bison (3-2) – Game summary

Quarter	1	2	3	4	Total
Spiders	14	7	7	0	28
Bison	7	10	7	9	33

at Christy Mathewson–Memorial Stadium • Lewisburg, PA

- Date: October 4
- Game time: 12:00 PM EDT
- Game weather: Sunny
- Referee: Tom Zetts
- TV announcers (ESPN+): Doug Birdsong (play-by-play) and Charle Fisher (analyst)

Game information

First Quarter

- (13:10) RICH - Ashten Snelsire 24-yard pass to Isaiah Dawson, Jayden Alsheskie kick (Drive: 4 Plays, 62 yards, 1:43; RICH 7–0)
- (8:19) BUCK - Michael Cadden 4-yard run, Matt Schearer kick (Drive: 9 Plays, 72 yards, 4:45; TIED 7–7)
- (5:41) RICH - Ashten Snelsire 25-yard pass to Isaiah Dawson, Jayden Alsheskie kick (Drive: 6 Plays, 83 yards, 2:31; RICH 14–7)

Second Quarter

- (14:56) BUCK - Logan Bush 11-yard run, Matt Schearer kick (Drive: 11 Plays, 78 yards, 5:40; TIED 14–14)
- (11:42) RICH - Ashten Snelsire 25-yard pass to Andrew King, Jayden Alsheskie kick (Drive: 6 Plays, 69 yards, 3:09; RICH 21–14)
- (0:05) BUCK - Matt Schearer 31-yard field goal (Drive: 10 Plays, 61 yards, 1:23; RICH 21–17)

Third Quarter

- (10:39) BUCK - Michael Cadden 2-yard run, Matt Schearer kick (Drive: 8 Plays, 86 yards, 4:16; BUCK 24–21)
- (8:25) RICH - Ashten Snelsire 25-yard pass to Ja'Vion Griffin, Jayden Alsheskie kick (Drive: 5 Plays, 74 yards, 2:12; RICH 28–24)

Fourth Quarter

- (6:14) BUCK - Matt Schearer 27-yard field goal (Drive: 14 Plays, 80 yards, 5:59; RICH 28–27)
- (2:14) BUCK - Ralph Rucker IV 20-yard pass to Nate Anderson, 2-point conversion failed (Drive: 6 Plays, 49 yards, 1:38; BUCK 33–28)

Statistics	RICH	BUCK
First downs	25	32
Total yards	494	496
Rushing yards	187	212
Passing yards	307	284
Passing: Comp–Att–Int	16–27–3	24–35–0
Time of possession	24:03	35:57

Team	Category	Player	Statistics
Richmond	Passing	Ashten Snelsire	16/27, 307 yards, 4 TD
Richmond	Rushing	Aziz Foster-Powell	8 carries, 108 yards
Richmond	Receiving	Isaiah Dawson	6 receptions, 144 yards, 2 TD
Bucknell	Passing	Ralph Rucker IV	24/34, 284 yards, TD
Bucknell	Rushing	Logan Bush	8 carries, 47 yards, TD
Bucknell	Receiving	Sam Milligan	11 receptions, 133 yards

=== Lafayette ===
Bucknell Bison (4-2) vs. Lafayette Leopards (4-2) – Game summary

Quarter	1	2	3	4	Total
Bison	0	10	14	0	24
Leopards	7	27	14	14	62

at Fisher Stadium • Easton, PA

- Date: October 11
- Game time: 12:30 PM EDT
- Game weather: Cloudy
- Game attendance: 3,873
- Referee: Todd Boyd
- TV announcers (ESPN+): Gary Laubach (play-by-play), Mike Joseph (analyst) and Luke Meli (sideline)

Statistics	BUCK	LAF
First downs		
Total yards		
Rushing yards		
Passing yards		
Passing: Comp–Att–Int		
Time of possession		

Team	Category	Player	Statistics
Bucknell	Passing		
Bucknell	Rushing		
Bucknell	Receiving		
Lafayette	Passing		
Lafayette	Rushing		
Lafayette	Receiving		

=== at Cornell ===
Bucknell Bison (4-3) vs. Cornell Big Red (0-4) – Game summary

Quarter	1	2	3	4	Total
Bison	0	7	0	13	20
Big Red	3	6	14	7	30

at Schoellkopf Field • Ithaca, NY

- Date: October 18
- Game time: 1:00 p.m. EDT
- Game weather: Cloudy
- Game attendance: 4,205
- Referee: Todd Bowman
- TV announcers (ESPN+): Nick DeLuca (play-by-play) and Matt Miller (analyst)

Statistics	BUCK	COR
First downs		
Total yards		
Rushing yards		
Passing yards		
Passing: Comp–Att–Int		
Time of possession		

Team	Category	Player	Statistics
Bucknell	Passing		
Bucknell	Rushing		
Bucknell	Receiving		
Cornell	Passing		
Cornell	Rushing		
Cornell	Receiving		

=== Georgetown ===
Georgetown Hoyas (4-3) vs. Bucknell Bison (4-4) – Game summary

Quarter	1	2	3	4	Total
Hoyas	7	7	7	10	31
Bison	0	14	0	10	24

at Christy Mathewson–Memorial Stadium • Lewisburg, PA

- Date: October 25
- Game time: 12:00 PM EDT
- Game weather: Sunny
- Game attendance: 778
- Referee: Eric Lewis
- TV announcers (ESPN+): Doug Birdsong (play-by-play) and Charle Fisher (analyst)

Statistics	GTWN	BUCK
First downs		
Total yards		
Rushing yards		
Passing yards		
Passing: Comp–Att–Int		
Time of possession		

Team	Category	Player	Statistics
Georgetown	Passing		
Georgetown	Rushing		
Georgetown	Receiving		
Bucknell	Passing		
Bucknell	Rushing		
Bucknell	Receiving		

=== at Fordham ===
Bucknell Bison (4-5) vs. Fordham Rams (1-8) – Game summary

Quarter	1	2	3	4	Total
Bison	-	-	-	-	0
Rams	-	-	-	-	0

at Coffey Field • New York City, NY

- Date: November 8
- Game time: 1:00 PM EST

Statistics	BUCK	FOR
First downs		
Total yards		
Rushing yards		
Passing yards		
Passing: Comp–Att–Int		
Time of possession		

Team	Category	Player	Statistics
Bucknell	Passing		
Bucknell	Rushing		
Bucknell	Receiving		
Fordham	Passing		
Fordham	Rushing		
Fordham	Receiving		

=== Holy Cross ===
Holy Cross Crusaders (0-0) vs. Bucknell Bison (0-0) – Game summary

Quarter	1	2	3	4	Total
Crusaders	-	-	-	-	0
Bison	-	-	-	-	0

at Christy Mathewson–Memorial Stadium • Lewisburg, PA

- Date: November 15
- Game time: 12:00 PM EST

Statistics	HC	BUCK
First downs		
Total yards		
Rushing yards		
Passing yards		
Passing: Comp–Att–Int		
Time of possession		

Team	Category	Player	Statistics
Holy Cross	Passing		
Holy Cross	Rushing		
Holy Cross	Receiving		
Bucknell	Passing		
Bucknell	Rushing		
Bucknell	Receiving		

=== at Colgate ===
Bucknell Bison (0-0) vs. Colgate Raiders (0-0) – Game summary

Quarter	1	2	3	4	Total
Bison	-	-	-	-	0
Raiders	-	-	-	-	0

at Crown Field at Andy Kerr Stadium • Hamilton, NY

- Date: November 22
- Game time: 1:00 PM EST

Statistics	BUCK	COLG
First downs		
Total yards		
Rushing yards		
Passing yards		
Passing: Comp–Att–Int		
Time of possession		

Team	Category	Player	Statistics
Bucknell	Passing		
Bucknell	Rushing		
Bucknell	Receiving		
Colgate	Passing		
Colgate	Rushing		
Colgate	Receiving		
