= 2025 Holy Cross Crusaders football team =

American college football season

2025 Holy Cross Crusaders football
- Conference: Patriot League
- Record: 3–9 (3–4 Patriot)
- Head coach: Dan Curran (2nd season)
- Offensive coordinator: Andrew Dresner (2nd season)
- Defensive coordinator: Brian Vaganek (2nd season)
- Home stadium: Fitton Field

2025 Patriot League football standings
| | Conf. | | | Overall |
| Team | W | | L | W | | L |
|---|---|---|---|---|---|---|
| No. 10 Lehigh $^ | 7 | – | 0 | 12 | – | 1 |
| Lafayette | 6 | – | 1 | 8 | – | 4 |
| Holy Cross | 3 | – | 4 | 3 | – | 9 |
| Richmond | 3 | – | 4 | 7 | – | 5 |
| Georgetown | 3 | – | 4 | 6 | – | 6 |
| Colgate | 3 | – | 4 | 5 | – | 7 |
| Bucknell | 2 | – | 5 | 5 | – | 7 |
| Fordham | 1 | – | 6 | 1 | – | 11 |
$ – Conference champion; ^ – FCS playoff participant; Rankings from STATS Poll

The 2025 Holy Cross Crusaders football team represented the College of the Holy Cross as a member of the Patriot League during the 2025 NCAA Division I FCS football season. The Crusaders were led by second-year head coach Dan Curran and played at the Fitton Field in Worcester, Massachusetts.

The Holy Cross Crusaders drew an average home attendance of 13,931, the 13th-highest of all NCAA Division I FCS football teams.

== Schedule ==
| Date | Time | Opponent | Site | TV | Result | Attendance |
|---|---|---|---|---|---|---|
| August 30 | 3:30 p.m. | at Northern Illinois* | Huskie Stadium; DeKalb, IL | ESPN+ | L 17–19 | 10,569 |
| September 6 | 6:00 p.m. | at New Hampshire* | Wildcat Stadium; Durham, NH | FloSports | L 16–19 | 6,509 |
| September 13 | 2:00 p.m. | No. 6 Rhode Island* | Fitton Field; Worcester, MA | ESPN+ | L 7–9 | 14,127 |
| September 20 | 12:00 p.m. | at Yale* | Yale Bowl; New Haven, CT | ESPN+ | L 10–28 | 4,469 |
| September 27 | 1:00 p.m. | at Fordham | Coffey Field; The Bronx, NY (Ram–Crusader Cup) | ESPN+ | L 21–26 | 2,039 |
| October 4 | 2:00 p.m. | No. 25 Harvard*^{†} | Fitton Field; Worcester, MA | ESPN+ | L 24–59 | 15,549 |
| October 18 | 2:00 p.m. | at Richmond | E. Claiborne Robins Stadium; Richmond, VA | ESPN+ | W 28–22 | 5,419 |
| October 25 | 1:00 p.m. | Colgate | Fitton Field; Worcester, MA | ESPN+ | L 28–29 | 9,724 |
| November 1 | 1:00 p.m. | Lafayette | Fitton Field; Worcester, MA | ESPN+ | L 13–21 | 16,583 |
| November 8 | 12:00 p.m. | at No. 4 Lehigh | Goodman Stadium; Lower Saucon Township, PA | ESPN+ | L 3–38 | 5,346 |
| November 15 | 12:00 p.m. | at Bucknell | Christy Mathewson–Memorial Stadium; Lewisburg, PA | ESPN+ | W 37–20 | 913 |
| November 22 | 1:00 p.m. | vs. Georgetown | Fenway Park; Boston, MA | ESPN+ | W 42–7 | 13,674 |
*Non-conference game; ^{†}Homecoming; Rankings from STATS Poll released prior to the game; All times are in Eastern time

== Game summaries ==
=== at Northern Illinois (FBS) ===
Holy Cross Crusaders (0–0) at Northern Illinois Huskies (FBS) (0–0) – Game summary

| Quarter | 1 | 2 | 3 | 4 | Total |
|---|---|---|---|---|---|
| Crusaders | 0 | 3 | 0 | 14 | 17 |
| Huskies (FBS) | 3 | 3 | 0 | 13 | 19 |

at Huskie Stadium • DeKalb, Illinois

- Date: August 30
- Game time: 2:30 PM CDT
- Game attendance: 10,569
- Referee: Marcel Kerr
- TV announcers (ESPN+): Kelsie Kasper, Ryan Cavanaugh

Game information

First quarter

- NIU – Andrew Glass 20-yard field goal, 4:00. Huskies 3–0. Drive: 8 plays, 63 yards, 3:24.

Second quarter

- HC – Luis Palenzuela 33-yard field goal, 3:22. Tied 3–3. Drive: 4 plays, -2 yards, 1:49.
- NIU – Andrew Glass 39-yard field goal, 0:10. Huskies 6–3. Drive: 12 plays, 71 yards, 3:07.

Third quarter

No scoring plays.

Fourth quarter

- HC – Blake Youngblood 16-yard pass from Cal Swanson (Luis Palenzuela kick), 10:34. Crusaders 10–6. Drive: 4 plays, 77 yards, 1:27.
- NIU – Dev'ion Reynolds 96-yard kickoff return (Andrew Glass kick failed), 10:21. Huskies 12–10.
- NIU – Chavon Wright 2-yard run (Andrew Glass kick), 4:15. Huskies 19–10. Drive: 8 plays, 61 yards, 4:05.
- HC – Alijah Cason 97-yard kickoff return (Luis Palenzuela kick), 4:03. Huskies 19–17.

| Statistics | HC | NIU |
|---|---|---|
| First downs | 11 | 17 |
| Plays–yards | 55–217 | 72–287 |
| Rushes–yards | 26–62 | 48–178 |
| Passing yards | 155 | 109 |
| Passing: Comp–Att–Int | 17–29–1 | 14–24–1 |
| Turnovers | 1 | 1 |
| Time of possession | 26:34 | 33:26 |

| Team | Category | Player | Statistics |
|---|---|---|---|
| Holy Cross | Passing | Cal Swanson | 17/29, 155 yards, TD, INT |
| Holy Cross | Rushing | Cal Swanson | 12 carries, 51 yards |
| Holy Cross | Receiving | Max Mosey | 6 receptions, 71 yards |
| Northern Illinois | Passing | Josh Holst | 12/18, 101 yards, INT |
| Northern Illinois | Rushing | Chavon Wright | 11 carries, 77 yards, TD |
| Northern Illinois | Receiving | Dearee Rogers | 7 receptions, 73 yards |

=== at New Hampshire ===
Holy Cross Crusaders (0–1) at New Hampshire Wildcats (1–0) – Game summary

| Quarter | 1 | 2 | 3 | 4 | Total |
|---|---|---|---|---|---|
| Crusaders | 9 | 0 | 0 | 7 | 16 |
| Wildcats | 7 | 3 | 3 | 6 | 19 |

at Wildcat Stadium • Durham, NH

- Date: September 6
- Game time: 6:00 PM EDT
- Game attendance: 6,509
- Referee: Jeremy DeAngulo
- TV announcers (FloFootball): Ben Altsher (play-by-play) and Evan Gray (analyst)

Game information

First quarter

- HC – Eli Thompson 24-yard interception return (Luis Palenzuela kick BLOCKED), 13:29. Crusaders 6–0.
- UNH – Josh Fillion 53-yard pass from Caleb Burke (Nick Reed kick), 13:16. Wildcats 7–6. Drive: 1 play, 53 yards, 0:08.
- HC – Luis Palenzuela 34-yard field goal, 7:39. Crusaders 9–7. Drive: 12 plays, 58 yards, 5:37.

Second quarter

- UNH – Nick Reed 33-yard field goal, 0:00. Wildcats 10–9. Drive: 7 plays, 48 yards, 3:22.

Third quarter

- UNH – Nick Reed 30-yard field goal, 2:05. Wildcats 13–9. Drive: 7 plays, 52 yards, 3:34.

Fourth quarter

- HC – Jayden Clerveaux 1-yard run (Luis Palenzuela kick), 12:13. Crusaders 16–13. Drive: 9 plays, 67 yards, 4:47.
- UNH – Nick Reed 50-yard field goal, 9:13. Tied 16–16. Drive: 6 plays, 41 yards, 9:05.
- UNH – Nick Reed 40-yard field goal, 0:00. Wildcats 19–16. Drive: 9 plays, 58 yards, 1:40.

| Statistics | HC | UNH |
|---|---|---|
| First downs | 18 | 14 |
| Plays–yards | 58–251 | 54–279 |
| Rushes–yards | 43–156 | 31–97 |
| Passing yards | 95 | 182 |
| Passing: Comp–Att–Int | 8–15–1 | 12–23–2 |
| Turnovers | 1 | 2 |
| Time of possession | 31:12 | 28:48 |

| Team | Category | Player | Statistics |
|---|---|---|---|
| Holy Cross | Passing | Cal Swanson | 8/15, 95 yards, INT |
| Holy Cross | Rushing | Jayden Clerveaux | 18 carries, 66 yards, TD |
| Holy Cross | Receiving | Max Mosey | 4 receptions, 56 yards |
| New Hampshire | Passing | Matt Vezza | 11/21, 129 yards, 2 INT |
| New Hampshire | Rushing | Myles Thomason | 19 carries, 46 yards |
| New Hampshire | Receiving | Josh Fillion | 2 receptions, 57 yards |

=== No. 6 Rhode Island ===
No. 6 Rhode Island Rams (2–0) at Holy Cross Crusaders (0–2) – Game summary

| Quarter | 1 | 2 | 3 | 4 | Total |
|---|---|---|---|---|---|
| No. 6 Rams | 3 | 3 | 0 | 3 | 9 |
| Crusaders | 0 | 7 | 0 | 0 | 7 |

at Fitton Field • Worcester, MA

- Date: September 13
- Game time: 2:00 PM EDT
- Game attendance: 14,127
- Referee: Justin Ackley
- TV announcers (ESPN+): Jorge Bannister (play-by-play), Kevin Shea (analyst) and Alexandra DeCapua (sideline)

Game information

First quarter

- URI – Garth White 24-yard field goal, 6:26. Rams 3–0. Drive: 14 plays, 78 yards, 6:02.

Second quarter

- HC – Jayden Clerveaux 1-yard run (Owen Saraceno kick), 5:30. Crusaders 7–3. Drive: 9 plays, 54 yards, 4:32.
- URI – Garth White 29-yard field goal, 1:24. Crusaders 7–6. Drive: 13 plays, 69 yards, 4:06.

Third quarter

- No scoring plays.

Fourth quarter

- URI – Garth White 41-yard field goal, 2:23. Rams 9–7. Drive: 8 plays, 60 yards, 3:34.

| Statistics | URI | HC |
|---|---|---|
| First downs | 19 | 15 |
| Plays–yards | 64–402 | 60–229 |
| Rushes–yards | 27–131 | 31–72 |
| Passing yards | 271 | 157 |
| Passing: Comp–Att–Int | 22–37–1 | 14–29–0 |
| Turnovers | 1 | 0 |
| Time of possession | 31:03 | 28:51 |

| Team | Category | Player | Statistics |
|---|---|---|---|
| Rhode Island | Passing | Devin Farrell | 22/37, 271 yards, INT |
| Rhode Island | Rushing | Antwain Littleton Jr. | 18 carries, 94 yards |
| Rhode Island | Receiving | Marquis Buchanan | 5 receptions, 84 yards |
| Holy Cross | Passing | Cal Swanson | 14/29, 157 yards |
| Holy Cross | Rushing | Jayden Clerveaux | 8 carries, 29 yards, TD |
| Holy Cross | Receiving | Max Mosey | 4 receptions, 40 yards |

=== at Yale ===
Holy Cross Crusaders (0-3) at Yale Bulldogs (0-0) – Game summary

| Quarter | 1 | 2 | 3 | 4 | Total |
|---|---|---|---|---|---|
| Crusaders | 0 | 0 | 3 | 7 | 10 |
| Bulldogs | 7 | 0 | 14 | 7 | 28 |

at Yale Bowl • New Haven, CT

- Date: September 20
- Game time: 12:00 p.m. EDT
- Game weather: Sunny • Temperature: 70 °F (21 °C) • Wind: SW at 6 miles per hour (9.7 km/h)
- Game attendance: 4,469
- Referee: Alex Parrella
- TV announcers (ESPN+): Jim Cain (play-by-play) and Jack Siedlecki (analyst)

Game information

First Quarter

- (9:16) YALE – Josh Pitsenberger 1-yard run, Nick Conforti kick (Drive: 12 plays, 76 yards, 5:38; Yale 7–0)

Second Quarter

No scoring plays

Third Quarter

- (11:08) HC – Luis Palenzuela 23-yard field goal (Drive: 7 plays, 84 yards, 3:47; Yale 7–3)
- (7:20) YALE – Josh Pitsenberger 1-yard run, Nick Conforti kick (Drive: 9 plays, 77 yards, 3:43; Yale 14–3)
- (3:02) YALE – Nico Brown 29-yard pass from Dante Reno, Nick Conforti kick (Drive: 5 plays, 69 yards, 1:55; Yale 21–3)

Fourth Quarter

- (11:49) YALE – Josh Pitsenberger 10-yard run, Nick Conforti kick (Drive: 9 plays, 47 yards, 4:35; Yale 28–3)
- (0:56) HC – Charly Mullaly 7-yard pass from Cal Swanson, Luis Palenzuela kick (Drive: 13 plays, 63 yards, 4:33; Yale 28–10)

| Statistics | HC | YALE |
|---|---|---|
| First downs | 19 | 18 |
| Total yards | 281 | 318 |
| Rushing yards | 88 | 152 |
| Passing yards | 193 | 166 |
| Passing: Comp–Att–Int | 15–32–0 | 13–18–0 |
| Time of possession | 29:15 | 30:45 |

| Team | Category | Player | Statistics |
|---|---|---|---|
| Holy Cross | Passing | Cal Swanson | 15/30, 193 yards, TD |
| Holy Cross | Rushing | Nyeoti Punni | 6 carries, 36 yards |
| Holy Cross | Receiving | Joseph Williams | 1 reception, 64 yards |
| Yale | Passing | Dante Reno | 13/18, 166 yards, TD |
| Yale | Rushing | Josh Pitsenberger | 26 carries, 127 yards, 3 TD |
| Yale | Receiving | Nico Brown | 5 receptions, 119 yards, TD |

=== at Fordham (Ram–Crusader Cup) ===
Holy Cross Crusaders (0-4) vs. Fordham Rams (0-4) – Game summary

| Quarter | 1 | 2 | 3 | 4 | Total |
|---|---|---|---|---|---|
| Crusaders | 7 | 14 | 0 | 0 | 21 |
| Rams | 14 | 6 | 3 | 3 | 26 |

at Coffey Field • New York City, NY

- Date: September 27
- Game time: 1:00 PM EDT
- Game weather: Sunny • Temperature: 76 °F (24 °C) • Wind: NE at 6 miles per hour (9.7 km/h)
- Game attendance: 2,039
- Referee: Alexander Randolph
- TV announcers (ESPN+): Andrew Bogusch (play-by-play) and Andrew Posadas (analyst)

Game information

First Quarter

- FOR - Ricky Parks 45-yard run (Bennett Henderson kick), 14:02. Rams 7-0. Drive: 2 plays, 80 yards, 0:51.
- FOR - Gunnar Smith 2-yard run (Bennett Henderson kick), 4:12. Rams 14-0. Drive: 10 plays, 74 yards, 3:55.
- HC - Cal Swanson 2-yard run (Luis Palenzuela kick), 1:18. Rams 14-7. Drive: 6 plays, 50 yards, 2:54.

Second Quarter

- FOR - Nodin Tracy 31-yard pass from Gunnar Smith (Bennett Henderson PAT failed), 14:20. Rams 20-7. Drive: 6 plays, 76 yards, 1:52.
- HC - Mason McSweeney 6-yard pass from Cal Swanson (Luis Palenzuela kick), 7:07. Rams 20-14. Drive: 13 plays, 75 yards, 7:06.
- HC - Jayden Clerveaux 5-yard run (Luis Palenzuela kick), 2:38. Crusaders 21-20. Drive: 6 plays, 76 yards, 2:46.

Third Quarter

- FOR - Bennett Henderson 36-yard Field Goal, 8:02. Rams 23-21. Drive: 10 plays, 56 yards, 5:21.

Fourth Quarter

- FOR - Bennett Henderson 35-yard Field Goal, 8:28. Rams 26-21. Drive: 9 plays, 55 yards, 4:45.

| Statistics | HC | FOR |
|---|---|---|
| First downs | 20 | 17 |
| Total yards | 345 | 422 |
| Rushing yards | 102 | 168 |
| Passing yards | 243 | 254 |
| Passing: Comp–Att–Int | 27–43–1 | 14–21–0 |
| Time of possession | 34:55 | 25:05 |

| Team | Category | Player | Statistics |
|---|---|---|---|
| Holy Cross | Passing | Cal Swanson | 18/27, 186 yards |
| Holy Cross | Rushing | Jayden Clerveaux | 17 carries, 84 yards, TD |
| Holy Cross | Receiving | Max Mosey | 7 receptions, 70 yards |
| Fordham | Passing | Gunnar Smith | 14/21, 254 yards, TD |
| Fordham | Rushing | Ricky Parks | 12 carries, 85 yards, TD |
| Fordham | Receiving | Ricky Gonzalez II | 2 receptions, 55 yards |

=== No. 25 Harvard ===
No. 25 Harvard Crimson (2-0) vs. Holy Cross Crusaders (0-5) – Game summary

| Quarter | 1 | 2 | 3 | 4 | Total |
|---|---|---|---|---|---|
| No. 25 Crimson | 21 | 17 | 21 | 0 | 59 |
| Crusaders | 0 | 3 | 7 | 14 | 24 |

at Fitton Field • Worcester, MA

- Date: October 4
- Game time: 2:00 p.m. EDT
- TV announcers (ESPN+): Kevin Gehl (play-by-play) and Kevin Shea (analyst)

| Statistics | HARV | HC |
|---|---|---|
| First downs | | |
| Total yards | | |
| Rushing yards | | |
| Passing yards | | |
| Passing: Comp–Att–Int | | |
| Time of possession | | |

| Team | Category | Player | Statistics |
|---|---|---|---|
| Harvard | Passing | | |
| Harvard | Rushing | | |
| Harvard | Receiving | | |
| Holy Cross | Passing | | |
| Holy Cross | Rushing | | |
| Holy Cross | Receiving | | |

=== at Richmond ===
Holy Cross Crusaders (0-6) vs. Richmond Spiders (4-3) – Game summary

| Quarter | 1 | 2 | 3 | 4 | Total |
|---|---|---|---|---|---|
| Crusaders | 7 | 7 | 7 | 7 | 28 |
| Spiders | 7 | 3 | 9 | 3 | 22 |

at E. Claiborne Robins Stadium • Richmond, VA

- Date: October 18
- Game time: 2:00 p.m. EDT
- Game weather: Sunny • Temperature: 73 °F (23 °C) • Wind: N at 6 miles per hour (9.7 km/h)
- Game attendance: 5,419
- Referee: Cody Hanson
- TV announcers (ESPN+/MSN): Bob Black (play-by-play), Jasmonn Coleman (analyst) and Tamara Brown (sideline)

Game information

First Quarter

- (13:29) RICH - Kyle Wickersham 56-yard pass to Andreas Hill, Jayden Alsheskie kick (Drive: 3 Play, 75 yards, 1:26; RICH 7–0)
- (4:29) HC - Dominic Campanile 4-yard run, Luis Palenzuela kick (Drive: 16 Plays, 75 yards, 9:00; TIED 7–7)

Second Quarter

- (13:14) HC - Nyeoti Punni 1-yard run, Luis Palenzuela kick (Drive: 9 Plays, 45 yards, 3:52; HC 14–7)
- (0:00) RICH - Jayden Alsheskie 41-yard field goal (Drive: 5 Plays, 16 yards, 0:32; HC 14–10)

Third Quarter

- (7:46) RICH - Jayden Alsheskie 28-yard field goal (Drive: 12 Plays, 59 yards, 6:13; HC 14–13)
- (6:59) HC - Jayden Clerveaux 43-yard run, Luis Palenzuela kick (Drive: 1 Play, 43 yards, 0:08; HC 21–13)
- (3:38) RICH - Aziz Foster-Powell 7-yard run, 2-point conversion failed (Drive: 7 Plays, 82 yards, 3:16; HC 21–19)

Fourth Quarter

- (11:38) HC - Joseph Williams 1-yard run, Luis Palenzuela kick (Drive: 12 Plays, 60 yards, 6:53; HC 28–19)
- (5:00) RICH - Jayden Alsheskie 27-yard field goal (Drive: 12 Plays, 65 yards, 6:38; HC 28–22)

| Statistics | HC | RICH |
|---|---|---|
| First downs | 16 | 19 |
| Total yards | 246 | 373 |
| Rushing yards | 155 | 155 |
| Passing yards | 91 | 218 |
| Passing: Comp–Att–Int | 13–25–0 | 20–32–0 |
| Time of possession | 28:57 | 31:03 |

| Team | Category | Player | Statistics |
|---|---|---|---|
| Holy Cross | Passing | Braden Graham | 13/25, 91 yards |
| Holy Cross | Rushing | Jayden Clerveaux | 12 carries, 77 yards, TD |
| Holy Cross | Receiving | Ty Curran | 4 receptions, 39 yards |
| Richmond | Passing | Kyle Wickersham | 20/32, 218 yards, TD |
| Richmond | Rushing | Kyle Wickersham | 17 carries, 80 yards |
| Richmond | Receiving | Ja'Vion Griffin | 6 receptions, 71 yards |

=== Colgate ===
Colgate Raiders (2-5) vs. Holy Cross Crusaders (1-6) – Game summary

| Quarter | 1 | 2 | 3 | 4 | Total |
|---|---|---|---|---|---|
| Raiders | - | - | - | - | 0 |
| Crusaders | - | - | - | - | 0 |

at Fitton Field • Worcester, MA

- Date: October 25
- Game time: 1:00 p.m. EDT
- TV: ESPN+

| Statistics | COLG | HC |
|---|---|---|
| First downs | | |
| Total yards | | |
| Rushing yards | | |
| Passing yards | | |
| Passing: Comp–Att–Int | | |
| Time of possession | | |

| Team | Category | Player | Statistics |
|---|---|---|---|
| Colgate | Passing | | |
| Colgate | Rushing | | |
| Colgate | Receiving | | |
| Holy Cross | Passing | | |
| Holy Cross | Rushing | | |
| Holy Cross | Receiving | | |

=== Lafayette ===
Lafayette Leopards (5-3) vs. Holy Cross Crusaders (1-7) – Game summary

| Quarter | 1 | 2 | 3 | 4 | Total |
|---|---|---|---|---|---|
| Leopards | - | - | - | - | 0 |
| Crusaders | - | - | - | - | 0 |

at Fitton Field • Worcester, MA

- Date: November 1
- Game time: 12:00 PM EDT

| Statistics | LAF | HC |
|---|---|---|
| First downs | | |
| Total yards | | |
| Rushing yards | | |
| Passing yards | | |
| Passing: Comp–Att–Int | | |
| Time of possession | | |

| Team | Category | Player | Statistics |
|---|---|---|---|
| Lafayette | Passing | | |
| Lafayette | Rushing | | |
| Lafayette | Receiving | | |
| Holy Cross | Passing | | |
| Holy Cross | Rushing | | |
| Holy Cross | Receiving | | |

=== at No. 4 Lehigh ===
Holy Cross Crusaders (1-8) vs. No. 4 Lehigh Mountain Hawks (9-0) – Game summary

| Quarter | 1 | 2 | 3 | 4 | Total |
|---|---|---|---|---|---|
| Crusaders | - | - | - | - | 0 |
| No. 4 Mountain Hawks | - | - | - | - | 0 |

at Goodman Stadium • Lower Saucon Township, PA

- Date: November 8
- Game time: 12:00 p.m. EDT
- TV announcers (ESPN+): Marco Socci (play-by-play) and Mike Yadush (analyst)

| Statistics | HC | LEH |
|---|---|---|
| First downs | | |
| Total yards | | |
| Rushing yards | | |
| Passing yards | | |
| Passing: Comp–Att–Int | | |
| Time of possession | | |

| Team | Category | Player | Statistics |
|---|---|---|---|
| Holy Cross | Passing | | |
| Holy Cross | Rushing | | |
| Holy Cross | Receiving | | |
| Lehigh | Passing | | |
| Lehigh | Rushing | | |
| Lehigh | Receiving | | |

=== at Bucknell ===
Holy Cross Crusaders (0-0) vs. Bucknell Bison (0-0) – Game summary

| Quarter | 1 | 2 | 3 | 4 | Total |
|---|---|---|---|---|---|
| Crusaders | - | - | - | - | 0 |
| Bison | - | - | - | - | 0 |

at Christy Mathewson–Memorial Stadium • Lewisburg, PA

- Date: November 15
- Game time: 12:00 PM EST

| Statistics | HC | BUCK |
|---|---|---|
| First downs | | |
| Total yards | | |
| Rushing yards | | |
| Passing yards | | |
| Passing: Comp–Att–Int | | |
| Time of possession | | |

| Team | Category | Player | Statistics |
|---|---|---|---|
| Holy Cross | Passing | | |
| Holy Cross | Rushing | | |
| Holy Cross | Receiving | | |
| Bucknell | Passing | | |
| Bucknell | Rushing | | |
| Bucknell | Receiving | | |

=== vs. Georgetown ===
Georgetown Hoyas (0-0) vs. Holy Cross Crusaders (0-0) – Game summary

| Quarter | 1 | 2 | 3 | 4 | Total |
|---|---|---|---|---|---|
| Hoyas | - | - | - | - | 0 |
| Crusaders | - | - | - | - | 0 |

at Fenway Park • Boston, MA

- Date: November 22
- Game time: 1:00 PM EST

| Statistics | GTWN | HC |
|---|---|---|
| First downs | | |
| Total yards | | |
| Rushing yards | | |
| Passing yards | | |
| Passing: Comp–Att–Int | | |
| Time of possession | | |

| Team | Category | Player | Statistics |
|---|---|---|---|
| Georgetown | Passing | | |
| Georgetown | Rushing | | |
| Georgetown | Receiving | | |
| Holy Cross | Passing | | |
| Holy Cross | Rushing | | |
| Holy Cross | Receiving | | |
