= Matt Spatny =

American gridiron football player (born 2004)

No. 94 – BC Lions
- Position: Defensive lineman
- Roster status: Active
- CFL status: American

Personal information
- Born: August 4, 2004 (age 22)
- Listed height: 6 ft 2 in (1.88 m)
- Listed weight: 250 lb (113 kg)

Career information
- High school: Medina (Medina, Ohio)
- College: Lehigh (2022–2025)
- NFL draft: 2026: undrafted

Career history
- BC Lions (2026–present)

Awards and highlights
- 2× First-team All-Patriot League (2024, 2025)
- Stats at CFL.ca

Matthew Spatny (born August 4, 2004) is an American professional football defensive lineman for the BC Lions of the Canadian Football League (CFL). He played college football for the Lehigh Mountain Hawks.

== Early life ==
Spatny was born on August 4, 2004. He attended Medina High School in Medina, Ohio. On January 25, 2022, Spatny committed to play college football at Lehigh University.

== College career ==
Spatny played college football for the Lehigh Mountain Hawks from 2022 to 2025. In 43 games, he had 111 tackles, including 34 for loss, 25.5 sacks, one pass deflections and two fumble recoveries. Spatny earned first-team All-Patriot League honors in 2024 and 2025.

== Professional career ==
Pre-draft measurables
Height	Weight	Arm length	Hand span	Wingspan	40-yard dash	10-yard split	20-yard split	20-yard shuttle	Three-cone drill	Vertical jump	Broad jump	Bench press
6 ft 2 in (1.88 m)	247 lb (112 kg)	31 in (0.79 m)	9 in (0.23 m)	6 ft 4 1/4 in (1.94 m)	4.65 s	1.62 s	2.74 s	4.44 s	7.45 s	38 in (0.97 m)	9 ft 11 in (3.02 m)	24 reps
All values from Pro Day

On June 8, 2026, Spatny signed with the BC Lions of the Canadian Football League (CFL). On June 26, 2026, Spatny was promoted to the Lions' active roster and on June 27, 2026, he made his CFL debut in a loss against the Calgary Stampeders. On July 17, 2026, Spatny recorded his first tackle and fumble recovery against the Edmonton Elks. On July 24, 2026, Spatny was placed on the Lions' 6-game injured list after suffering a foot injury the previous week. He rejoined the active roster on October 22, 2026.
