= 2024 Yale Bulldogs football team =

American college football season

2024 Yale Bulldogs football
- Conference: Ivy League
- Record: 7–3 (4–3 Ivy)
- Head coach: Tony Reno (12th season)
- Offensive coordinator: Chris Ostrowsky (2nd season)
- Offensive scheme: Pro spread
- Defensive coordinator: Sean McGowan (7th season)
- Co-defensive coordinator: Jay Anderson (2nd season)
- Base defense: 4–2–5
- Home stadium: Yale Bowl

2024 Ivy League football standings
	Conf.			Overall
Team	W		L	W		L
Dartmouth +	5	–	2	8	–	2
No. 25 Harvard +	5	–	2	8	–	2
Columbia +	5	–	2	7	–	3
Yale	4	–	3	7	–	3
Cornell	3	–	4	4	–	6
Penn	2	–	5	4	–	6
Brown	2	–	5	3	–	7
Princeton	2	–	5	3	–	7
+ – Conference co-champions; Rankings from STATS Poll

The 2024 Yale Bulldogs football team represented Yale University as a member of the Ivy League during the 2024 NCAA Division I FCS football season.

== Preseason ==
=== Ivy League media poll ===
The Ivy League preseason poll was released on August 5, 2024. The Bulldogs were predicted to finish first in the conference.

== Schedule ==
Date	Time	Opponent	Site	TV	Result	Attendance
September 21	2:00 p.m.	at Holy Cross*	Fitton Field; Worcester, MA	ESPN+	W 38–31	15,117
September 28	2:00 p.m.	at Cornell	Schoellkopf Field; Ithaca, NY	ESPN+	L 23–47	12,444
October 5	12:00 p.m.	Central Connecticut*	Yale Bowl; New Haven, CT	ESPN+	W 23–22	5,123
October 12	12:00 p.m.	Dartmouth	Yale Bowl; New Haven, CT	ESPN+	L 43–44 ^{OT}	4,983
October 19	12:00 p.m.	Lehigh*	Yale Bowl; New Haven, CT	ESPN+	W 38–23	4,307
October 25	7:00 p.m.	at Penn	Franklin Field; Philadelphia, PA	ESPNU	W 31–10	7,917
November 1	7:00 p.m.	at Columbia	Wien Stadium; New York, NY	ESPNU	L 10–13	3,560
November 9	12:00 p.m.	Brown	Yale Bowl; New Haven, CT	ESPN+	W 56–34	4,742
November 16	12:00 p.m.	Princeton	Yale Bowl; New Haven, CT (rivalry)	ESPN+	W 42–28	7,594
November 23	12:00 p.m.	at No. 17 Harvard	Harvard Stadium; Allston, MA (rivalry)	ESPNU	W 34–29	27,105
*Non-conference game; Rankings from STATS Poll released prior to the game; All times are in Eastern time; Source:

== Roster ==
2024 Yale Bulldogs football team roster
Players
Coaches
Offense

Pos.	#	Name	Class
RB	5	Cuttler Adams	Fr
OL	72	Bennett Anderson	Fr
OL	66	Bennie Anderson	Sr
WR	81	Thomas Bacon Jr.	Fr
TE	88	Ryan Belk	Sr
OL	75	Michael Bennett	Jr
OL	58	Leo Bluhm	Jr
WR	8	Nico Brown	Jr
OL	71	Kevin Cassidy	Fr
OL	70	Cameron Charron	Jr
WR	20	Chase Collyer	So
RB	28	Wilhelm Daal	Jr
RB	21	Nathan Denney	Sr
OL	73	Teo Falk	Sr
WR	23	Joey Felton	Sr
QB	6	Bradyn Fleharty	Fr
TE	80	Luke Foster	Sr
OL	55	Dylan Garrity	So
OL	74	Connor Halverson	Sr
WR	14	Camden Hickox	Fr
QB	3	Marshall Howe	Jr
OL	78	Charlie Humphreys	Fr
QB	9	Grant Jordan	Sr
WR	83	Brice June	So
OL	77	Jack Karhu	Sr
WR	16	Garon Kemp	So
OL	69	Quinton Lewis	So
WR	12	Kyle Maltarich	Fr
TE	50/87	Ben Mann	Sr
QB	15	Brogan McCaughey	Jr
WR	13	Donovan McKoy	So
TE	42	Spencer Mermans	So
OL	79	Jack Molloy	Sr
OL	57	Joseph Nash	Jr
WR	2	Chase Nenad	Sr
RB	31	Adam Pandolfi	Fr
WR	10	David Pantelis	Sr
RB	0	Tre Peterson	Sr
RB	7	Joshua Pitsenberger	Jr
RB, WR	4	Cameron Price	Jr
TE	82	Nolan Recker	Jr
TE	85	Colton Sanders	Fr
WR	18	Jaxton Santiago	Fr
OL	50	Declan Savage	Jr
OL	62	Aaron Session	Jr
WR	1	Mason Shipp	Sr
OL	61	Connor Smith	Sr
TE	90	Graham Smith	So
WR	27	Kelvin Smith	Sr
OL	54	Jackson St. Aubyn	So
WR	11	Aidan Stephens	Jr
WR	19	Devyn Suggs	Sr
OL	60	Sean Sullivan	Sr
TE	17	Robby Tattersall	So
TE	84	Scott Truninger	Jr
TE	22	Brady Wagner	Fr
OL	64	Andrew Weisz	Sr
WR	86	Davis Wong	Fr
TE	44	Ry Yates	Sr

Defense

Pos.	#	Name	Class
DB	16	Damian Anderson	Sr
DL	99	Cooper Austin	So
LB	24	Inumidun Ayo-Durojaiye	Sr
DB	27	Brandon Banks	Fr
DB	14	Charles Barkley-Smith	Fr
DB	19	Kade Barnes	Sr
LB	34	Joseph Barry	So
DB	48	Brandon Benn	Sr
LB	7	Jacob Biggs	Sr
DL	37	Jackson Boone	Fr
LB	13	Nathaniel Campbell	Sr
DL	33	James Cave	So
DB	0	Osize Daniyan	So
DB	25	Dylan Darville	So
DB	32	Billy Eastep	Fr
DL	51	Ejiroghene Egodogbare	Jr
DL	54	Babawale Fadeyibi	So
DB	18	Da'Quan Gonzales	Jr
DB	20	Joseph Gonzales	Sr
DB	8	Phoenix Grant	So
DL	2	Alvin Gulley Jr.	Sr
DB	3	Sean Guyton	Sr
DB	35	Zack Haaland	Sr
DB	21	Ty Ingram-Eiser	Fr
DL	45	Zairion Jackson-Bass	So
DL	93	Mack Johnson	Fr
DL	94	Kevin Jourdain	Sr
DB	4	Abu Kamara	So
DB	29	John Kemp	So
LB	22	Jason Lee	Sr
LB	46	Joe McCord	Fr
DL	9	Tamatoa McDonough	Sr
DL	92	Sam McGivern	Fr
DL	30	Jack Michalik	Sr
DL	40	Raleigh Oxendine	Sr
DL	91	Trent Page	Fr
LB	44	Eddie Palumbo	Fr
LB	12	Steven Partin	Fr
LB	36	Wyatt Raymond	Sr
DB	28	Dillon Rickenbacker	Fr
DL	56	Xavier Rivers	Fr
DB	1	Archie Russ III	Sr
DB	5	Jacob Saffold	Sr
DB	15	JP Schmidt	Fr
DL	43	Micaiah Shaber	Jr
LB	52	Dean Shaffer	Sr
DB	6	Joshua Tarver	Jr
DL	96	Jaylin Tate	So
DB	10	Breylan Thompson	Fr
DL	49	Mitchell Tyler	Sr
DL	97	Lota Ugokwe	Fr
DB	23	Ruben Valenzuela	Jr
LB	31	Walker Warncke	Sr
DB	17	Brandon Webster	So
DB	11	Chris White	Fr
LB	41	Melik Williams	Jr
DL	98	Dylan Yang	Jr

Special teams

Pos.	#	Name	Class
K, P	26	Nick Conforti	Jr
K, P	39	Shamus Florio	Sr
LS	55	Joey Fortner	So

Head coach

- Tony Reno

Coordinators/assistant coaches

- Sean McGowan – Head coach of defense/linebackers
- Chris Ostrowsky – Offensive coordinator/quarterbacks
- Steven Vashel – Special teams coordinator/outside linebackers/specialists
- Jay Anderson – Co-defensive coordinator/defensive backs
- Stefon Wheeler – Run game coordinator/offensive line
- Tim Janecek – Defensive line
- Marcus Knight – Wide receivers
- Paul Rice – Tight ends
- Chris Bergeski – Running backs
- Alex Kurtz – Director of recruiting
- Larry Ciotti – Advisor to head coach
- Elijah Weeks – Director of player development
- Spencer Field – Assistant strength & conditioning coach
- John Vecchio – Assistant data analytics specialist

Legend

- (C) Team captain
- (S) Suspended
- (I) Ineligible
- Injured
- Redshirt

Roster
Last update: November 9, 2024

== Game summaries ==
=== at Holy Cross ===
Game One – Yale Bulldogs (0–0) vs Holy Cross Crusaders (1–2) – Game summary

Quarter	1	2	3	4	Total
Bulldogs	14	3	7	14	38
Crusaders	7	10	0	14	31

at Fitton Field • Worcester, MA

- Date: Saturday September 21, 2024
- Game time: 2:00 p.m.
- Game weather: Rainy • Temperature: 59 °F (15 °C) • Wind: NE 11 mph
- Game attendance: 15,117
- Referee: Todd Boyd
- TV: ESPN+
- Box Score

Game information

First quarter

- (09:04) YALE - Brogan McCaughey 3 yd run (Nick Conforti kick), (Drive 14 plays, 81 yards, 05:49; 7-0 Yale)
- 08:51 HC - Maxwell Warren 74 yd pass from Joe Pesansky (Daniel Porto kick), (Drive 1 play, 74 yards, 00:09; 7-7 Tied)
- (05:59) YALE - Wilhelm Daal 2 yd run (Nick Conforti kick), (Drive 6 plays, 75 yards, 02:52; 14-7 Yale)

Second quarter

- (11:13) HC - Jayden Clerveaux 1 yd run (Daniel Porto kick), (Drive 9 plays, 52 yards, 04:30; 14-14 Tied)
- (06:40) YALE - Nick Conforti 40 yd field goal, (Drive 13 plays, 46 yards, 04:28; 17-14 Yale)
- (00:00) HC - Daniel Porto 45 yd field goal, (Drive 5 plays, 43 yards, 00:43; 17-17 Tied)

Third quarter

- (07:32) YALE - David Pantelis 24 yd pass from Brogan McCaughey (Nick Conforti kick), (Drive 10 plays, 78 yards, 04:28; 24-17 Yale)

Fourth quarter

- (14:49) HC - Jayden Clerveaux 6 yd run (Daniel Porto kick), (Drive 13 plays, 65 yards, 07:37; 24-24 Tied)
- (06:32) YALE - Nathan Denney 5 yd run (Nick Conforti kick), (Drive 3 plays, 21 yards, 01:29; 31-24 Yale)
- (03:35) HC - Jayden Clerveaux 1 yd run (Daniel Porto kick), (Drive 8 plays, 61 yards, 02:50; 31-31 Tied)
- (00:12) YALE - Nathan Denney 3 yd run (Nick Conforti kick), (Drive 9 plays, 64 yards, 03:18; 38-31 Yale)

Statistics	YALE	HC
First downs	23	22
Total yards	394	426
Rushing yards	143	147
Passing yards	251	279
Passing: Comp–Att–Int	20-34-0	12-27-0
Time of possession	31:45	28:15

Team	Category	Player	Statistics
Yale	Passing	Brogan McCaughey	18/32, 217 yards, 1 TD
Yale	Rushing	Nathan Denney	29 carries, 86 yards, 2 TD
Yale	Receiving	David Pantelis	6 receptions, 95 yards, 1 TD
Holy Cross	Passing	Joe Pesansky	12/26, 279 yards, 1 TD
Holy Cross	Rushing	Jayden Clerveaux	17 carries, 51 yards, 3 TD
Holy Cross	Receiving	Max Mosey	5 receptions, 129 yards

=== at Cornell ===
Game Two – Yale Bulldogs (1–0) vs Cornell Big Red (0–1) – Game summary

Quarter	1	2	3	4	Total
Bulldogs	7	7	9	0	23
Big Red	13	14	6	14	47

at Schoellkopf Field • Ithaca, NY

- Date: Saturday September 28, 2024
- Game time: 2:00 p.m.
- Game weather: Cloudy • Temperature: 72 °F (22 °C) • Wind: NW 7 mph
- Game attendance: 12,444
- Referee: Alex Parrella
- TV: ESPN+
- Box Score

Game information

First quarter

- (11:29) COR - Brendan Lee 34 yd pass from Jameson Wang (Alan Zhao kick), (Drive 5 plays, 75 yards, 01:25; 7-0 Cornell)
- (08:40) YALE - Ry Yates 8 yd pass from Brogan McCaughey (Nick Conforti kick), ( Drive 6 plays, 75 yards, 02:49; 7-7 Tied)
- (06:21) COR - Alan Zhao 24 yd field goal, (Drive 5 plays, 18 yards, 01:08; 10-7 Cornell)
- (03:08) COR - Alan Zhao 34 yd field goal, (Drive 7 plays, 3 yards, 02:57; 13-7 Cornell)

Second quarter

- (12:53) YALE - Josh Pitsenberger 9 yd run (Nick Conforti kick), (Drive 11 plays, 75 yards, 05:15; 14-13 Yale)
- (11:16) COR - Brendan Lee 39 yd pass from Jameson Wang (Alan Zhao kick), (Drive 5 plays, 75 yards, 01:37; 20-14 Cornell)
- (04:44) COR - Ean Pope 37 yd run (Alan Zhao kick), (Drive 8 plays, 82 yards, 03:45; 27-14 Cornell)

Third quarter

- (09:17) YALE - Nick Conforti 24 yd field goal, (Drive 5 plays, 10 yards, 02:24; 27-17 Cornell)
- (08:01) COR - Ryder Kurtz 68 yd pass from Jameson Wang (Alan Zhao PAT failed), (Drive 3 plays, 75 yards, 01:16; 33-17 Cornell)
- (04:29) YALE - Josh Pitsenberger 1 yd run (Two-Point Pass Conversion Failed), (Drive 7 plays, 41 yards, 03:24; 33-23 Cornell)

Fourth quarter

- (13:35) COR - Jameson Wang 1 yd run (Alan Zhao kick), *Drive 14 plays, 77 yards, 05:49; 40-23 Cornell)
- (01:11) COR - Samuel Musungu 12 yd pass from Jameson Wang (Alan Zhao kick), (Drive 9 plays, 38 yards, 05:40; 47-23 Cornell)

Statistics	YALE	COR
First downs	16	22
Total yards	302	475
Rushing yards	120	197
Passing yards	182	278
Passing: Comp–Att–Int	16-27-1	18-29-0
Time of possession	29:51	30:09

Team	Category	Player	Statistics
Yale	Passing	Brogan McCaughey	14/21, 173 yards, 1 TD
Yale	Rushing	Josh Pitsenberger	17 carries, 70 yards, 2 TD
Yale	Receiving	David Pantelis	5 receptions, 86 yards
Cornell	Passing	Jameson Wang	18/29, 278 yards, 4 TD
Cornell	Rushing	Ean Pope	11 carries, 72 yards, 1 TD
Cornell	Receiving	Brendan Lee	5 receptions, 99 yards, 2 TD

=== Central Connecticut ===
Game Three – Central Connecticut Blue Devils (2–2) at Yale Bulldogs (1–0) – Game summary

Quarter	1	2	3	4	Total
Blue Devils	3	7	6	6	22
Bulldogs	10	7	0	6	23

at Yale Bowl, New Haven, CT

- Date: Saturday October 5, 2024
- Game time: 12:00 p.m.
- Game weather: Sunny • Temperature: 67 °F (19 °C) • Wind: N 9 mph
- Game attendance: 5,123
- Referee: Alexander Rudolph
- TV announcers (ESPN+): Justin Gallanty (play-by-play) and Jack Siedlecki (analyst)
- Box Score

Game information

First quarter

- (10:30) YALE - Nick Conforti 36 Yd Field Goal (Drive: 11 plays, 57 yards, 4:30; Yale 3-0)
- (5:25) CCSU - Jack Barnum 32 Yd Field Goal (Drive: 12 plays, 60 yards, 5:05; Tied 3-3)
- (1:29) YALE - Grant Jordan 4 Yd Run (Nick Conforti Kick) (Drive: 8 plays, 71 yards, 3:51; Yale 10-3)

Second quarter

- (13:02) CCSU - Jamir Robertson 49 Yd pass from Brady Olson (Jack Barnum Kick) (Drive: 9 plays, 85 yards, 3:21; Tied 10-10)
- (2:14) YALE - Joshua Pitsenberger 64 Yd Run (Nick Conforti Kick) (Drive: 7 plays, 99 yards, 3:28; Yale 17-10)

Third quarter

- (3:59) CCSU - Jack Barnum 38 Yd Field Goal (Drive: 7 plays, 60 yards, 3:39; Yale 17-13)
- (0:21) CCSU - Jack Barnum 42 Yd Field Goal (Drive: 7 plays, 35 yards, 3:01; Yale 17-16)

Fourth quarter

- (11:25) CCSU - Isaac Boston 19 Yd pass from Brady Olson (Two-Point Pass Conversion Failed) (Drive: 9 plays, 57 yards, 3:20; Central Connecticut 22-17)
- (8:15) YALE - Luke Foster 19 Yd pass from Grant Jordan (Two-Point Pass Conversion Failed) (Drive: 5 plays, 30 yards, 1:09; Yale 23-22)

Statistics	CCSU	YALE
First downs	24	18
Total yards	458	339
Rushing yards	170	193
Passing yards	288	146
Passing: Comp–Att–Int	17–31–0	16–31–2
Time of possession	34:31	25:29

Team	Category	Player	Statistics
Central Connecticut	Passing	Brady Olson	17/30, 288 yards, 2 TD, 2 INT
Central Connecticut	Rushing	Elijah Howard	25 carries, 108 yards
Central Connecticut	Receiving	Elijah Howard	5 receptions, 68 yards
Yale	Passing	Grant Jordan	16/31, 146 yards, TD
Yale	Rushing	Josh Pitsenberger	19 carries, 127 yards, TD
Yale	Receiving	David Pantelis	4 receptions, 45 yards

=== Dartmouth ===
Game Four – Dartmouth Big Green (3–0) at Yale Bulldogs (1–1) – Game summary

Quarter	1	2	3	4	OT	Total
Big Green	0	7	9	21	7	44
Bulldogs	2	21	7	7	6	43

at Yale Bowl, New Haven, CT

- Date: Saturday October 12, 2024
- Game time: 12:00 p.m.
- Game weather: Sunny • Temperature: 65 °F (18 °C) • Wind: NW 13 mph
- Game attendance: 4,983
- Referee: Eric Lewis
- TV announcers (ESPN+): Justin Gallanty (play-by-play) and Jack Siedlecki (analyst)
- Box Score

Game information

First quarter

- (02:56) YALE - Safety, (2-0 Yale)

Second quarter

- (14:52) YALE - Joey Felton 71 yd pass from Grant Jordan (Nick Conforti kick), (Drive 3 plays, 76 yards, 00:17; 9-0 Yale)
- (10:18) DART - Chris Corbo 32 yd pass from Grayson Saunier (Owen Zalc kick), (Drive 9 plays, 74 yards, 04:29; 9-7 Yale)
- (09:10) YALE - David Pantelis 62 yd pass from Grant Jordan (Nick Conforti kick), (Drive 3 plays, 75 yards, 01:08; 16-7 Yale)
- (01:44) YALE - Grant Jordan 1 yd run (Nick Conforti kick), (Drive 5 plays, 49 yards, 02:15; 23-7 Yale)

Third quarter

- (07:33) YALE - David Pantelis 17 yd pass from Grant Jordan (Nick Conforti kick), (Drive 8 plays, 50 yards, 02:57; 30-7 Yale)
- (05:51) DART - Grayson Saunier 1 yd run (Two-Point Conversion Failed), (Drive 4 plays, 75 yards, 01:36; 30-13 Yale)
- (02:31) DART - Owen Zalc 48 yd field goal 6 plays, (Drive 15 yards, 02:03; 30-16 Yale)

Fourth quarter

- (11:02) YALE - David Pantelis 10 yd pass from Grant Jordan (Nick Conforti kick), (Drive 5 plays, 29 yards, 02:20; 37-16 Yale)
- (07:30) DART - Paxton Scott 7 yd pass from Grayson Saunier (Owen Zalc kick), (Drive 11 plays, 75 yards, 03:32; 37-23 Yale)
- (06:34) DART - Daniel Haughton 7 yd pass from Grayson Saunier (Owen Zalc kick), (Drive 4 plays, 43 yards, 00:56; 37-30 Yale)
- (01:22) DART - Grayson Saunier 32 yd run (Owen Zalc kick), (Drive 8 plays, 71 yards, 01:58; 37-37 Tied)

Overtime

- (00:00) DART - Q Jones 2 yd run (Owen Zalc kick), (Drive 4 plays, 25 yards; 44-37 Dartmouth)
- (00:00) YALE - Chase Nenad 10 yd pass from Grant Jordan (Two-Point Conversion Failed), (Drive 6 plays, 25 yards; 44-43 Dartmouth)

Statistics	DART	YALE
First downs	24	28
Total yards	445	532
Rushing yards	157	120
Passing yards	288	412
Passing: Comp–Att–Int	22–42–0	32–47–0
Time of possession	27:26	32:34

Team	Category	Player	Statistics
Dartmouth	Passing	Grayson Saunier	20/34, 276 yards, 3 TD
Dartmouth	Rushing	Q Jones	18 carries, 84 yards, TD
Dartmouth	Receiving	Paxton Scott	6 receptions, 100 yards, TD
Yale	Passing	Grant Jordan	32/47, 412 yards, 5 TD
Yale	Rushing	Josh Pitsenberger	21 carries, 71 yards
Yale	Receiving	David Pantelis	8 receptions, 117 yards, 3 TD

=== Lehigh (Yank Townsend Trophy) ===
Game Five – Lehigh Mountain Hawks (3–2) at Yale Bulldogs (2–2) – Game summary

Quarter	1	2	3	4	Total
Mountain Hawks	3	7	7	6	23
Bulldogs	14	14	10	0	38

at Yale Bowl, New Haven, CT

- Date: Saturday October 19, 2024
- Game time: 12:00 p.m.
- Game weather: Sunny • Temperature: 51 °F (11 °C) • Wind: NE 6 mph
- Game attendance: 4,107
- Referee: Jeremy DeAngulo
- TV: ESPN+
- Box score

Game information

First quarter

- (11:27) LEH - Nick Garrido 36 Yard Field Goal (Drive: 8 plays 43 yards, 3:24 Lehigh 3-0)
- (3:46) YALE - Joey Felton 20 Yard pass from Grand Jordan, Nick Conforti Kick (Yale 7-3)
- (0:41) YALE - Da'Quan Gonzales 53 Yard interception return, Nick Conforti Kick (Drive: 6 plays, 90 yards, 3:00 Yale 14-3)

Second quarter

- (14:13) LEH - Luke Yoder 38 Yard run, Nick Garrido Kick (Drive: 4 plays, 48 yards, 1:15 Yale 14-10)
- (3:07) YALE - Grant Jordan 10 Yard run, Nick Conforti Kick (Drive: 9 plays, 53 yards, 4:10 Yale 21-10)
- (3:07) YALE - Joshua Pitsenberger 10Yard run, Nick Conforti Kick (Drive: 10 plays, 66 yards, 2:08 Yale 28-10)

Third quarter

- (8:19) YALE - Nick Conforti 40 Yard field goal (Drive: 9 plays, 31 yards, 2:39 Yale 31-10)
- (2:56) LEH - Jaden Green 9 Yard run, Nick Garrido Kick (Drive: 10 plays, 67 yards, 5:20 Yale 31-17)
- (0:57) YALE - Tre Peterson 57 Yard run, Nick Conforti Kick (Drive: 4 plays, 75 yards, 1:59 Yale 38-17)

Fourth quarter

- (1:52) LEH - Hayden Johnson 7 Yard run, Nick Garrido PAT failed (Drive: 10 plays, 60 yards, 4:20 Yale 38-23)

Statistics	LEH	YALE
First downs	20	20
Total yards	372	365
Rushing yards	250	258
Passing yards	122	107
Passing: Comp–Att–Int	14-29-3	15-26-1
Time of possession	31:56	28:04

Team	Category	Player	Statistics
Lehigh	Passing	Hayden Johnson	8/16, 74 Yards, 1 INT
Lehigh	Rushing	Luke Yoder	15 carries, 143 yards, 1 TD
Lehigh	Receiving	Geoffrey Jamiel	7 receptions, 54 yards
Yale	Passing	Grant Jordan	15/26, 107 yards, 1 TD, 1 INT
Yale	Rushing	Tre Peterson	12 carries, 98 yards, 1 TD
Yale	Receiving	Mason Shipp	6 receptions, 55 yards

=== at Penn ===
Game Six – Yale Bulldogs (3–2) vs Penn Quakers (2–3) – Game summary

Quarter	1	2	3	4	Total
Bulldogs	14	7	7	3	31
Quakers	0	10	0	0	10

at Franklin Field • Philadelphia, PA

- Date: Friday October 25, 2024
- Game time: 7:00 p.m.
- Game weather: Clear • Temperature: 60 °F (16 °C)
- Game attendance: 7,917
- Referee: Paul Overton
- TV announcers (ESPNU): Eric Frede (play-by-play) and Jack Ford (analyst)
- Box Score

Game information

First quarter

- (09:52) YALE - David Pantelis 3 yd pass from Grant Jordan (Nick Conforti kick), (Drive 11 plays, 75 yards, 05:08; 7-0 Yale)
- (07:11) YALE - Chase Nenad 19 yd pass from Grant Jordan (Nick Conforti kick), (Drive 5 plays, 82 yards, 02:03; 14-0 Yale)

Second quarter

- (13:34) PENN - Sam Smith 25 yd field goal, (Drive 9 plays, 37 yards, 04:19; 14-3 Yale)
- (02:51) YALE - Joey Felton 20 yd pass from Grant Jordan (Nick Conforti kick), (Drive 6 plays, 60 yards, 02:15; 21-3 Yale)
- (00:43) PENN - Liam O'Brien 5 yd run (Sam Smith kick), (Drive 5 plays, 71 yards, 02:01; 21-10 Yale)

Third quarter

- (06:35) YALE - Luke Foster 1 yd pass from Grant Jordan (Nick Conforti kick), (Drive 9 plays, 77 yards, 05:02; 28-10 Yale)

Fourth quarter

- (08:42) YALE - Nick Conforti 22 yd field goal, (Drive 13 plays, 95 yards, 06:18; 31-10 Yale)

Statistics	YALE	PENN
First downs	24	12
Total yards	497	199
Rushing yards	208	108
Passing yards	289	91
Passing: Comp–Att–Int	24-30-1	8-20-1
Time of possession	34:49	25:11

Team	Category	Player	Statistics
Yale	Passing	Grant Jordan	24/30, 289 yards, 4 TD, 1 INT
Yale	Rushing	Josh Pitsenberger	14 carries, 83 yards
Yale	Receiving	David Pantelis	8 receptions, 123 yards, 1 TD
Penn	Passing	Liam O'Brien	8/13, 91 yards, 1 INT
Penn	Rushing	Liam O'Brien	13 carries, 61 yards, 1 TD
Penn	Receiving	Malachi Hosley	1 reception, 24 yards

=== at Columbia ===
Game Seven – Yale Bulldogs (4–2) vs Columbia Lions (4–2) – Game summary

Quarter	1	2	3	4	Total
Bulldogs	0	7	3	0	10
Lions	0	3	0	10	13

at Wien Stadium • New York, NY

- Date: Friday November 1, 2024
- Game time: 7:00 p.m.
- Game weather: Clear • Temperature: 68 °F (20 °C) • Wind: W 16 mph
- Game attendance: 3,560
- Referee: Jeff Pumphrey
- TV announcers (ESPNU): Eric Frede (play-by-play) and Jack Ford (analyst)
- Box Score

Game information

First quarter

- No Scoring

Second quarter

- (10:46) COL - Hugo Merry 22 yd field goal, (Drive 10 plays, 61 yards, 04:19; 3-0 Columbia)
- (00:56) YALE - Nathan Denney 24 yd pass from Grant Jordan (Nick Conforti kick), (Drive 12 plays, 79 yards, 05:11; 7-3 Yale)

Third quarter

- (00:26) YALE - Nick Conforti 38 yd field goal 9 plays, (Drive 49 yards, 04:07; 10-3 Yale)

Fourth quarter

- (09:55) COL - Hugo Merry 43 yd field goal, (Drive 12 plays, 50 yards, 05:31; 10-6 Yale)
- (04:39) COL - Bryson Canty 44 yd pass from Cole Freeman (Hugo Merry kick), (Drive 8 plays, 96 yards, 03:50; 13-10 Columbia)

Statistics	YALE	COLU
First downs	17	19
Total yards	293	332
Rushing yards	142	176
Passing yards	151	156
Passing: Comp–Att–Int	18-27-1	12-20-0
Time of possession	32:18	27:42

Team	Category	Player	Statistics
Yale	Passing	Grant Jordan	18/27, 151 yards, 1 TD, 1 INT
Yale	Rushing	Josh Pitsenberger	10 carries, 52 yards
Yale	Receiving	David Pantelis	6 receptions, 52 yards
Columbia	Passing	Cole Freeman	12/20, 156 yards, 1 TD
Columbia	Rushing	Cole Freeman	14 carries, 82 yards
Columbia	Receiving	Bryson Canty	5 receptions, 107 yards, 1 TD

=== Brown ===
Game Eight – Brown Bears (3–4) at Yale Bulldogs (4–3) – Game summary

Quarter	1	2	3	4	Total
Bears	7	10	9	8	34
Bulldogs	21	14	7	14	56

at Yale Bowl, New Haven, CT

- Date: Saturday November 9, 2024
- Game time: 12:00 p.m.
- Game weather: Sunny, 50 °F (10 °C)
- Game attendance: 4,742
- Referee: Tom Zetts
- TV: ESPN+
- Box Score

Game information
First quarter
- YALE – David Pantelis 9-yard pass from Grant Jordan (Nick Conforti kick), 10:29. Bulldogs 7–0. Drive: 10 plays, 58 yards, 3:59.
- BRWN – Qwentin Brown 1-yard run (Christopher Maron kick), 6:16. Tied 7–7. Drive: 12 plays, 75 yards, 4:13.
- YALE – David Pantelis 25-yard pass from Grant Jordan (Nick Conforti kick), 0:44. Bulldogs 14–7. Drive: 12 plays, 77 yards, 5:23.
- YALE – David Pantelis 29-yard pass from Grant Jordan (Nick Conforti kick), 0:29. Bulldogs 21–7. Drive: 1 play, 29 yards, 0:05.

Second quarter

- YALE – Grant Jordan 2-yard run (Nick Conforti kick), 13:25. Bulldogs 28–7. Drive: 5 plays, 35 yards, 1:36.
- BRWN – Qwentin Brown 1-yard run (Christopher Maron kick), 8:20. Bulldogs 28–14. Drive: 15 plays, 84 yards, 4:59.
- YALE – Ryan Belk 14-yard pass from Grant Jordan (Nick Conforti kick), 5:24. Bulldogs 35–14. Drive: 8 plays, 75 yards, 2:56.
- BRWN – Christopher Maron 22-yard field goal, 0:25. Bulldogs 35–17. Drive: 14 plays, 56 yards, 4:53.

Third quarter

- BRWN – Christopher Maron 34-yard field goal, 9:05. Bulldogs 35–20. Drive: 13 plays, 42 yards, 4:30.
- YALE – Mason Shipp 23-yard pass from Grant Jordan (Nick Conforti kick), 5:45. Bulldogs 42–20. Drive: 9 plays, 75 yards, 3:20.
- BRWN – Mark Mahoney 33-yard pass from Jake Wilcox (pass failed), 2:29. Bulldogs 42–26. Drive: 10 plays, 75 yards, 3:16.

Fourth quarter

- YALE – Mason Shipp 3-yard pass from Grant Jordan (Nick Conforti kick), 13:10. Bulldogs 49–26. Drive: 9 plays, 75 yards, 4:19.
- BRWN – Stockton Owen 15-yard run (James Murphy pass to Solomon Miller), 1:55. Bulldogs 49–34. Drive: 6 plays, 75 yards, 1:16.
- YALE – Tre Peterson 44-yard run (Nick Conforti kick), 1:47. Bulldogs 56–34. Drive: 1 play, 44 yards, 0:07.

Statistics	BRWN	YALE
First downs	33	21
Total yards	459	510
Rushing yards	116	138
Passing yards	343	372
Turnovers	4	1
Time of possession	30:27	29:33

Team	Category	Player	Statistics
Brown	Passing	Jake Wilcox	32/48, 273 yards, TD, 3 INT
Brown	Rushing	Matt Childs	16 rushes, 64 yards
Brown	Receiving	Mark Mahoney	10 receptions, 115 yards, TD
Yale	Passing	Grant Jordan	29/40, 372 yards, 6 TD
Yale	Rushing	Tre Peterson	7 rushes, 66 yards, TD
Yale	Receiving	David Pantelis	12 receptions, 195 yards, 3 TD

=== Princeton (rivalry) ===
Game Nine – Princeton Tigers (2–6) at Yale Bulldogs (5–3) – Game summary

Quarter	1	2	3	4	Total
Tigers	7	14	7	0	28
Bulldogs	7	14	14	7	42

at Yale Bowl, New Haven, CT

- Date: Saturday November 16, 2024
- Game time: 12:00 p.m.
- Game weather: Sunny • Temperature: 57 °F (14 °C) • Wind: NW 12 mph
- Game attendance: 7,594
- Referee: Todd Boyd
- TV: ESPN+

Game information

First quarter

- (07:52) PRI - Ethan Clark 3 yd run (Sam Massick kick), (Drive 7 plays, 47 yards, 03:12; 7-0 Princeton)
- (03:17) YALE - Josh Pitsenberger 1 yd run (Nick Conforti kick), (Drive 9 plays, 75 yards, 04:35; 7-7 Tied)

Second quarter

- (06:40) YALE - Josh Pitsenberger 5 yd pass from Grant Jordan (Nick Conforti kick), (Drive 13 plays, 89 yards, 06:49; 14-7 Yale)
- (04:54) PRI - Ethan Clark 1 yd run (Sam Massick kick), (Drive 5 plays, 75 yards, 01:46; 14-14 Tied)
- (01:50) YALE - Ejiroghene Egodogbare 8 yd fumble recovery (Conforti, Nick kick), (21-14 Yale)
- (00:22) PRI - AJ Barber 14 yd pass from Blaine Hipa (Sam Massick kick), (Drive 9 plays, 75 yards, 01:28; 21-21 Tied)

Third quarter

- (13:16) PRI - John Volker 37 yd run (Sam Massick kick), (Drive 6 plays, 64 yards, 01:40; 28-21 Princeton)
- (07:32) YALE - Josh Pitsenberger 4 yd run (Nick Conforti kick), (Drive 11 plays, 75 yards, 05:44; 28-28 Tied)
- (03:08) YALE - Grant Jordan 2 yd run (Nick Conforti kick), (Drive 3 plays, 13 yards, 01:04; 35-28 Yale)

Fourth quarter

- (11:40) YALE - Chase Nenad 31 yd pass from Grant Jordan (Nick Conforti kick), (Drive 8 plays, 90 yards, 04:19; 42-28 Yale)

Statistics	PRIN	YALE
First downs	22	24
Total yards	406	421
Rushing yards	139	281
Passing yards	267	140
Passing: Comp–Att–Int	23-39-1	13-16-0
Time of possession	28:16	31:44

Team	Category	Player	Statistics
Princeton	Passing	Blaine Hipa	23/39, 267 yards, 1 TD, 1 INT
Princeton	Rushing	Ethan Clark	12 carries, 79 yards, 2 TD
Princeton	Receiving	AJ Barber	7 receptions, 108 yards, 1 TD
Yale	Passing	Grant Jordan	13/16, 140 yards, 2 TD
Yale	Rushing	Josh Pitsenberger	25 carries, 159 yards, 2 TD
Yale	Receiving	Chase Nenad	3 receptions, 53 yards, 1 TD

=== at No. 17 Harvard (rivalry) ===
Game Ten – Yale Bulldogs (6–3) at No. 17 Harvard Crimson (8–1) – Game summary

Quarter	1	2	3	4	Total
Bulldogs	0	14	10	10	34
No. 17 Crimson	0	7	0	22	29

at Harvard Stadium, Boston, MA

- Date: Saturday November 23, 2024
- Game time: 12:00 p.m.
- Game weather: Cloudy • Temperature: 45 °F (7 °C) • Wind: NW 14 mph
- Game attendance: 27,105
- Referee: Jeff Pumphrey
- TV announcers (ESPNU): Eric Frede (play-by-play) and Jack Ford (analyst)
- Box Score

Game information

First quarter

- No Scoring

Second quarter

- (12:38) YALE - Chase Nenad 13 yd pass from Grant Jordan (Nick Conforti kick), (Drive 8 plays, 75 yards, 03:54; 7-0 Yale)
- (06:24) HAR - Cooper Barkate 44 yd pass from Jaden Craig (Kieran Corr kick), (Drive 2 plays, 44 yards, 00:33; 7-7 Tied)
- (04:00) YALE - Josh Pitsenberger 11 yd run (Nick Conforti kick), (Drive 5 plays, 76 yards, 02:19; 14-7 Yale)

Third quarter

- (13:47) YALE - Abu Kamara 35 yd interception (Nick Conforti kick), (21-7 Yale)
- (00:57) YALE - Nick Conforti 30 yd field goal, (Drive 13 plays, 69 yards, 06:57; 24-7 Yale)

Fourth quarter

- (14:52) HAR - Scott Woods II 28 yd pass from Jaden Craig (Jaden Craig pass), (Drive 4 plays, 71 yards, 00:57; 24-15 Yale
- (12:41) YALE - Josh Pitsenberger 39 yd pass from Grant Jordan (Nick Conforti kick), (Drive 6 plays, 71 yards, 02:04; 31-15 Yale)
- (08:58) HAR - Cooper Barkate 5 yd pass from Jaden Craig (Scott Woods II pass), (Drive 8 plays, 75 yards, 03:43; 31-23 Yale)
- (02:07) YALE - Nick Conforti 36 yd field goal, (Drive 6 plays, 20 yards, 02:28; 34-23 Yale)
- (00:18) HAR - Xaviah Bascon 5 yd run (Two point play failed), (Drive 11 plays, 75 yards, 01:49; 34-29 Yale)

Statistics	YALE	HARV
First downs	22	19
Total yards	503	349
Rushing yards	216	57
Passing yards	287	292
Passing: Comp–Att–Int	17–31–0	21–45–1
Time of possession	37:36	22:24

Team	Category	Player	Statistics
Yale	Passing	Grant Jordan	17/31, 287 yards, 2 TD
Yale	Rushing	Josh Pitsenberger	25 carries, 120 yards, TD
Yale	Receiving	David Pantelis	7 receptions, 148 yards
Harvard	Passing	Jaden Craig	21/45, 292 yards, 3 TD, INT
Harvard	Rushing	Shane McLaughlin	6 carries, 35 yards
Harvard	Receiving	Cooper Barkate	8 receptions, 169 yards, 2 TD
