= 2024 Princeton Tigers football team =

American college football season

2024 Princeton Tigers football
- Conference: Ivy League
- Record: 3–7 (2–5 Ivy)
- Head coach: Bob Surace (14th season)
- Offensive coordinator: Mike Rosenbaum (1st season)
- Offensive scheme: Spread option
- Defensive coordinator: Steve Verbit (11th season)
- Base defense: 4–2–5
- Home stadium: Powers Field at Princeton Stadium

2024 Ivy League football standings
	Conf.			Overall
Team	W		L	W		L
Dartmouth +	5	–	2	8	–	2
No. 25 Harvard +	5	–	2	8	–	2
Columbia +	5	–	2	7	–	3
Yale	4	–	3	7	–	3
Cornell	3	–	4	4	–	6
Penn	2	–	5	4	–	6
Brown	2	–	5	3	–	7
Princeton	2	–	5	3	–	7
+ – Conference co-champions; Rankings from STATS Poll

The 2024 Princeton Tigers football team represented Princeton University as a member of the Ivy League during the 2024 NCAA Division I FCS football season. The team was led by 14th-year head coach Bob Surace and played its home games at Powers Field at Princeton Stadium.

== Schedule ==
Date	Time	Opponent	Site	TV	Result	Attendance
September 21	12:00 p.m.	at Lehigh*	Goodman Stadium; Lower Saucon, PA	ESPN+	L 20–35	6,217
September 28	3:00 p.m.	Howard*	Powers Field at Princeton Stadium; Princeton, NJ	ESPN+	W 30–13	7,886
October 5	12:00 p.m.	at Columbia	Robert K. Kraft Field at Lawrence A. Wien Stadium; New York, NY	ESPN+	L 17–34	4,111
October 12	3:30 p.m.	at No. 8 Mercer*	Five Star Stadium; Macon, GA	ESPN+	L 7–34	8,143
October 18	7:00 p.m.	Brown	Powers Field at Princeton Stadium; Princeton, NJ	ESPNU	W 29–17	4,173
October 26	3:00 p.m.	at Harvard	Harvard Stadium; Boston, MA (rivalry)	ESPN+	L 13–45	12,244
November 2	1:00 p.m.	Cornell^{†}	Powers Field at Princeton Stadium; Princeton, NJ	ESPN+	L 35–49	7,626
November 8	6:00 p.m.	Dartmouth	Powers Field at Princeton Stadium; Princeton, NJ	ESPNU	L 17–26	3,222
November 16	12:00 p.m.	at Yale	Yale Bowl; New Haven, CT (rivalry)	ESPN+	L 28–42	7,594
November 23	1:00 p.m.	Penn	Powers Field at Princeton Stadium; Princeton, NJ (rivalry)	ESPN+	W 20–17	3,914
*Non-conference game; ^{†}Homecoming; Rankings from STATS Poll released prior to the game; All times are in Eastern time

== Game summaries ==
=== at Lehigh ===
Game One – Princeton Tigers (0–0) at Lehigh Mountain Hawks (2–1) – Game summary

Quarter	1	2	3	4	Total
Tigers	7	0	7	6	20
Mountain Hawks	7	14	0	14	35

at Goodman Stadium • Lower Saucon Township, Pennsylvania

- Date: September 21st
- Game time: 12:00 p.m. EST
- Game attendance: 6,217
- TV announcers (ESPN+): TBD

Game information

First quarter

- (9:04) LEH - Luke Yoder 20 Yard Run, Nick Garrido Kick (Drive: 3 plays, 39 yards, 1:24; Lehigh 7-0)
- (5:50) PRI - John Volker 3 Yard Run, Sam Massick Kick (Drive: 8 plays, 75 yards, 3:14; Tied 7-7)

Second quarter

- (8:54) LEH - Jaden Green 11 Yard Run, Nick Garrido Kick (Drive: 7 plays, 72 yards, 4:00; Lehigh 14-7)
- (5:40) LEH - Luke Yoder 1 Yard Run, Nick Garrido Kick (Drive: 3 plays, 50 yards, 1:35; Lehigh 21-7)

Third quarter

- (10:34) PRI - Blaine Hipa 36 Yard pass to Luke Colella, Sam Massick Kick (Drive: 11 plays, 79 yards, 4:19; Lehigh 21-14)

Fourth quarter

- (14:10) LEH - Hayden Johnson 17 Yard pass to Geoffrey Jamiel, Nick Garrido Kick (Drive: 12 plays, 69 yards, 6:59; Lehigh 28-14)
- (9:54) PRI - Blaine Hipa 3 Yard pass to Tyler Picinic, 2-point conversion failed (Drive: 12 plays, 75 yards, 4:16; Lehigh 28-20)
- (6:49) LEH - Jaden Green 34 Yard Run, Nick Garrido Kick (Drive: 5 plays. 71 yards, 2:58; Lehigh 35-20)

Statistics	PRIN	LEH
First downs	14	17
Total yards	212	346
Rushing yards	-7	153
Passing yards	219	193
Passing: Comp–Att–Int	16-22-3	16-40-0
Time of possession	25:29	34:31

Team	Category	Player	Statistics
Princeton	Passing	Blaine Hipa	16/38, 219, 2 TD, 3 INT
Princeton	Rushing	John Volker	10 carries, 28 yards, TD
Princeton	Receiving	Luke Colella	5 receptions, 86 yards, TD
Lehigh	Passing	Hayden Johnson	12/13, 165 yards, TD
Lehigh	Rushing	Jaden Green	18 carries, 82 yards, 2 TD
Lehigh	Receiving	Dylan McFadden	2 receptions, 62 yards

=== Howard ===
Game Two – Howard Bison (2–2) at Princeton Tigers (0–1) – Game summary

Quarter	1	2	3	4	Total
Bison	0	0	7	6	13
Tigers	10	10	3	7	30

at Princeton Stadium • Princeton, NJ

- Date: Saturday September 28, 2024
- Game time: 3:02 p.m.
- Game weather: 70 °F (21 °C) NE 10MPH Wind, Sunny
- Game attendance: 7,886
- TV: ESPN+

Game information

First quarter

1st 13:14 PRINCE - Colella, Luke 37 yd pass from McAllister, Blaine (Massick, Sam kick) 5 plays, 69 yards, TOP 01:39, HOW 0, PRINCE 7.

1st 07:09 PRINCE - Massick, Sam 27 yd field goal 4 plays, 5 yards, TOP 01:26, HOW 0, PRINCE 10.

Second quarter

2nd 07:39 PRINCE - McAllister, Blaine 7 yd run (Massick, Sam kick), 3 plays, 5 yards, TOP 01:34, HOW 0, PRINCE 17.

2nd 00:16 PRINCE - Sexton, Jeffrey 41 yd field goal 14 plays, 65 yards, TOP 03:21, HOW 0, PRINCE 20.

Third quarter

3rd 09:43 PRINCE - Sexton, Jeffrey 44 yd field goal 8 plays, 22 yards, TOP 03:08, HOW 0, PRINCE 23.

3rd 03:21 HOW - Hawthorne, Kasey 2 yd run (West, Dylan kick), 13 plays, 82 yards, TOP 06:12, HOW 7, PRINCE 23.

Fourth quarter

4th 08:34 HOW - Tolbert, Jaylon 1 yd run ( ), 12 plays, 85 yards, TOP 04:51, HOW 13, PRINCE 23.

4th 04:57 PRINCE - Murphy, Dareion 22 yd run (Massick, Sam kick), 7 plays, 75 yards, TOP 03:37, HOW 13, PRINCE 30.

FINAL HOWARD 13, PRINCETON 30.

Statistics	HOW	PRIN
First downs	18	18
Total yards	226	275
Rushing yards	92	195
Passing yards	80	134
Passing: Comp–Att–Int	17–29–1	5–19–0
Time of possession	31:41	28:19

Team	Category	Player	Statistics
Howard	Passing	Jaylon Tolbert	17/29, 134 yards, INT
Howard	Rushing	Eden James	17 carries, 73 yards
Howard	Receiving	Se'Quan Osborne	3 receptions, 42 yards
Princeton	Passing	Blaine McAllister	5/19, 80 yards, TD
Princeton	Rushing	John Volker	12 carries, 88 yards
Princeton	Receiving	Luke Colella	1 reception, 37 yards, TD

=== at Columbia ===
Game Three – Princeton Tigers (1–1) vs Columbia Lions (1–1) – Game summary

Quarter	1	2	3	4	Total
Tigers	7	3	0	7	17
Lions	3	3	14	14	34

at Robert K. Kraft Field at Lawrence A. Wien Stadium, New York, NY

- Date: Saturday October 5, 2024
- Game time: 12:00 PM
- TV announcers (ESPN+): TBD

Game information

First quarter
Second quarter
Third quarter
Fourth quarter

Statistics	PRIN	COLU
First downs		
Total yards		
Rushing yards		
Passing yards		
Passing: Comp–Att–Int		
Time of possession		

Team	Category	Player	Statistics
Princeton	Passing		
Princeton	Rushing		
Princeton	Receiving		
Columbia	Passing		
Columbia	Rushing		
Columbia	Receiving		

=== at No. 8 Mercer ===
Game Four – No. 8 Mercer Bears (5–0) at Princeton Tigers (1–2) – Game summary

Quarter	1	2	3	4	Total
Tigers	0	7	0	0	7
No. 8 Bears	17	3	0	14	34

at Five Star Stadium, Macon, Georgia

- Date: Saturday October 12, 2024
- Game time: 3:30 p.m. EDT
- TV: ESPN+

Game information

First quarter
Second quarter
Third quarter
Fourth quarter

Statistics	PRIN	MER
First downs		
Total yards		
Rushing yards		
Passing yards		
Passing: Comp–Att–Int		
Time of possession		

Team	Category	Player	Statistics
Princeton	Passing		
Princeton	Rushing		
Princeton	Receiving		
Mercer	Passing		
Mercer	Rushing		
Mercer	Receiving		

=== Brown ===
Game Five – Brown Bears (2–2) at Princeton Tigers (1–3) – Game summary

Quarter	1	2	3	4	Total
Bears	0	7	7	3	17
Tigers	12	10	0	7	29

at Princeton Stadium, Princeton, New Jersey

- Date: October 18
- Game time: 7:00 p.m. EDT
- Game weather: Sunny
- Game attendance: 4,173
- Referee: Anthony Florio
- TV announcers (ESPNU): Eric Frede (play-by-play) and Jack Ford (analyst)

Game information

First quarter

- PRIN – John Volker 66-yard run (kick failed), 13:10. Tigers 6–0. Drive: 4 plays, 75 yards, 1:50.
- PRIN – John Volker 7-yard run (pass failed), 5:16. Tigers 12–0. Drive: 11 plays, 90 yards, 5:17.

Second quarter

- PRIN – Blaine Hipa 13-yard run (Sam Massick kick), 12:27. Tigers 19–0. Drive: 3 plays, 13 yards, 0:56.
- BRWN – Solomon Miller 2-yard run (Christopher Maron kick), 8:39. Tigers 19–7. Drive: 10 plays, 75 yards, 3:48.
- PRIN – Sam Massick 28-yard field goal, 7:00. Tigers 22–7. Drive: 5 plays, 64 yards, 1:39.

Third quarter

- BRWN – Qwentin Brown 1-yard run (Christopher Maron kick), 7:18. Tigers 22–14. Drive: 18 plays, 75 yards, 7:42.

Fourth quarter

- BRWN – Christopher Maron 33-yard field goal, 8:17. Tigers 22–17. Drive: 13 plays, 65 yards, 4:52.
- PRIN – Luke Colella 12-yard pass from Blain Hipa (Sam Massick kick), 1:53. Tigers 29–17. Drive: 8 plays, 73 yards, 3:56.

Statistics	BRWN	PRIN
First downs	25	21
Total yards	443	379
Rushing yards	172	179
Passing yards	271	200
Passing: Comp–Att–Int	32–50–3	15–26–2
Time of possession	33:25	26:35

Team	Category	Player	Statistics
Brown	Passing	Jake Wilcox	32/50, 271 yards, 3 INT
Brown	Rushing	Jake Wilcox	11 carries, 55 yards
Brown	Receiving	Chason Barber	2 receptions, 43 yards
Princeton	Passing	Blaine Hipa	15/26, 200 yards, TD, 2 INT
Princeton	Rushing	John Volker	4 carries, 79 yards, 2 TD
Princeton	Receiving	Luke Colella	6 receptions, 96 yards, TD

=== at Harvard (rivalry) ===
Game Six – Princeton Tigers (2–3) vs Harvard Crimson (4–1) – Game summary

Quarter	1	2	3	4	Total
Tigers	7	3	3	0	13
Crimson	14	10	0	21	45

at Harvard Stadium, Boston, MA

- Date: Saturday October 26, 2024
- Game time: 3:00 PM
- TV announcers (ESPN+): TBD

Game information

First quarter
Second quarter
Third quarter
Fourth quarter

Statistics	PRIN	HARV
First downs		
Total yards		
Rushing yards		
Passing yards		
Passing: Comp–Att–Int		
Time of possession		

Team	Category	Player	Statistics
Princeton	Passing		
Princeton	Rushing		
Princeton	Receiving		
Harvard	Passing		
Harvard	Rushing		
Harvard	Receiving		

=== Cornell ===
Game Seven – Cornell Big Red (2–4) vs Princeton Tigers (2–4) – Game summary

Quarter	1	2	3	4	Total
Big Red	21	14	14	0	49
Tigers	0	14	0	21	35

at Princeton Stadium, Princeton, NJ

- Date: Saturday November 2, 2024
- Game time: 1:00 PM
- TV announcers (ESPN+): TBD

Game information

First quarter
Second quarter
Third quarter
Fourth quarter

Statistics	COR	PRIN
First downs		
Total yards		
Rushing yards		
Passing yards		
Passing: Comp–Att–Int		
Time of possession		

Team	Category	Player	Statistics
Cornell	Passing		
Cornell	Rushing		
Cornell	Receiving		
Princeton	Passing		
Princeton	Rushing		
Princeton	Receiving		

=== Dartmouth ===
Game Eight – Dartmouth Big Green (6–1) vs Princeton Tigers (2–5) – Game summary

Quarter	1	2	3	4	Total
Big Green	0	21	0	5	26
Tigers	7	0	7	3	17

at Princeton Stadium, Princeton, New Jersey

- Date: November 8
- Game time: 6:00 p.m. EST
- TV announcers (ESPNU): Eric Frede (play-by-play) and Jack Ford (analyst)

Game information

First quarter
Second quarter
Third quarter
Fourth quarter

Statistics	DART	PRIN
First downs		
Total yards		
Rushing yards		
Passing yards		
Passing: Comp–Att–Int		
Time of possession		

Team	Category	Player	Statistics
Dartmouth	Passing		
Dartmouth	Rushing		
Dartmouth	Receiving		
Princeton	Passing		
Princeton	Rushing		
Princeton	Receiving		

=== at Yale (rivalry) ===
Game Nine – Princeton Tigers (2–6) vs Yale Bulldogs (5–3) – Game summary

Quarter	1	2	3	4	Total
Tigers	7	14	7	0	28
Bulldogs	7	14	14	7	42

at Yale Bowl, New Haven, Connecticut

- Date: November 16
- Game time: 12:00 p.m. EST
- TV announcers (ESPN+): TBD

Game information

First quarter
Second quarter
Third quarter
Fourth quarter

Statistics	PRIN	YALE
First downs		
Total yards		
Rushing yards		
Passing yards		
Passing: Comp–Att–Int		
Time of possession		

Team	Category	Player	Statistics
Princeton	Passing		
Princeton	Rushing		
Princeton	Receiving		
Yale	Passing		
Yale	Rushing		
Yale	Receiving		

=== Penn (rivalry) ===
Game Ten – Penn Quakers (4–5) vs Princeton Tigers (2–7) – Game summary

Quarter	1	2	3	4	Total
Quakers	7	10	0	0	17
Tigers	7	3	10	0	20

at Princeton Stadium, Princeton, New Jersey

- Date: November 23
- Game time: 1:00 p.m. EST
- Game attendance: 3,914
- TV announcers (ESPN+): TBD

Game information

First quarter
Second quarter
Third quarter
Fourth quarter

Statistics	PENN	PRIN
First downs		
Total yards		
Rushing yards		
Passing yards		
Passing: Comp–Att–Int		
Time of possession		

Team	Category	Player	Statistics
Penn	Passing		
Penn	Rushing		
Penn	Receiving		
Princeton	Passing		
Princeton	Rushing		
Princeton	Receiving		
