= 2024 Brown Bears football team =

American college football season

2024 Brown Bears football

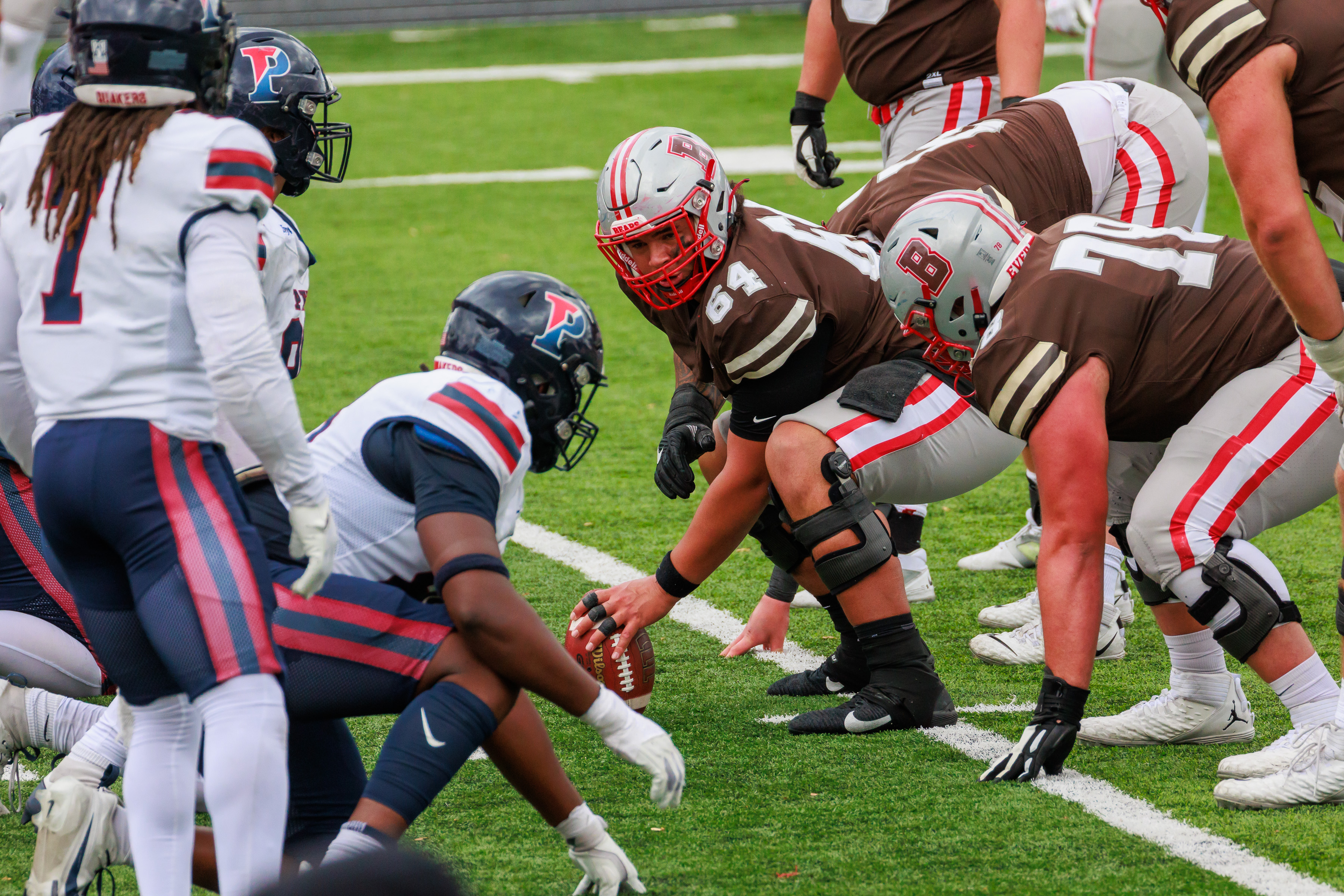
- The Bears lost to the Quakers, 28-38
- Conference: Ivy League
- Record: 3–7 (2–5 Ivy)
- Head coach: James Perry (5th season)
- Offensive coordinator: Ryan Mattison (3rd season)
- Offensive scheme: Air raid
- Defensive coordinator: Tim Weaver (5th season)
- Base defense: 3–4
- Home stadium: Richard Gouse Field at Brown Stadium

2024 Ivy League football standings
	Conf.			Overall
Team	W		L	W		L
Dartmouth +	5	–	2	8	–	2
No. 25 Harvard +	5	–	2	8	–	2
Columbia +	5	–	2	7	–	3
Yale	4	–	3	7	–	3
Cornell	3	–	4	4	–	6
Penn	2	–	5	4	–	6
Brown	2	–	5	3	–	7
Princeton	2	–	5	3	–	7
+ – Conference co-champions; Rankings from STATS Poll

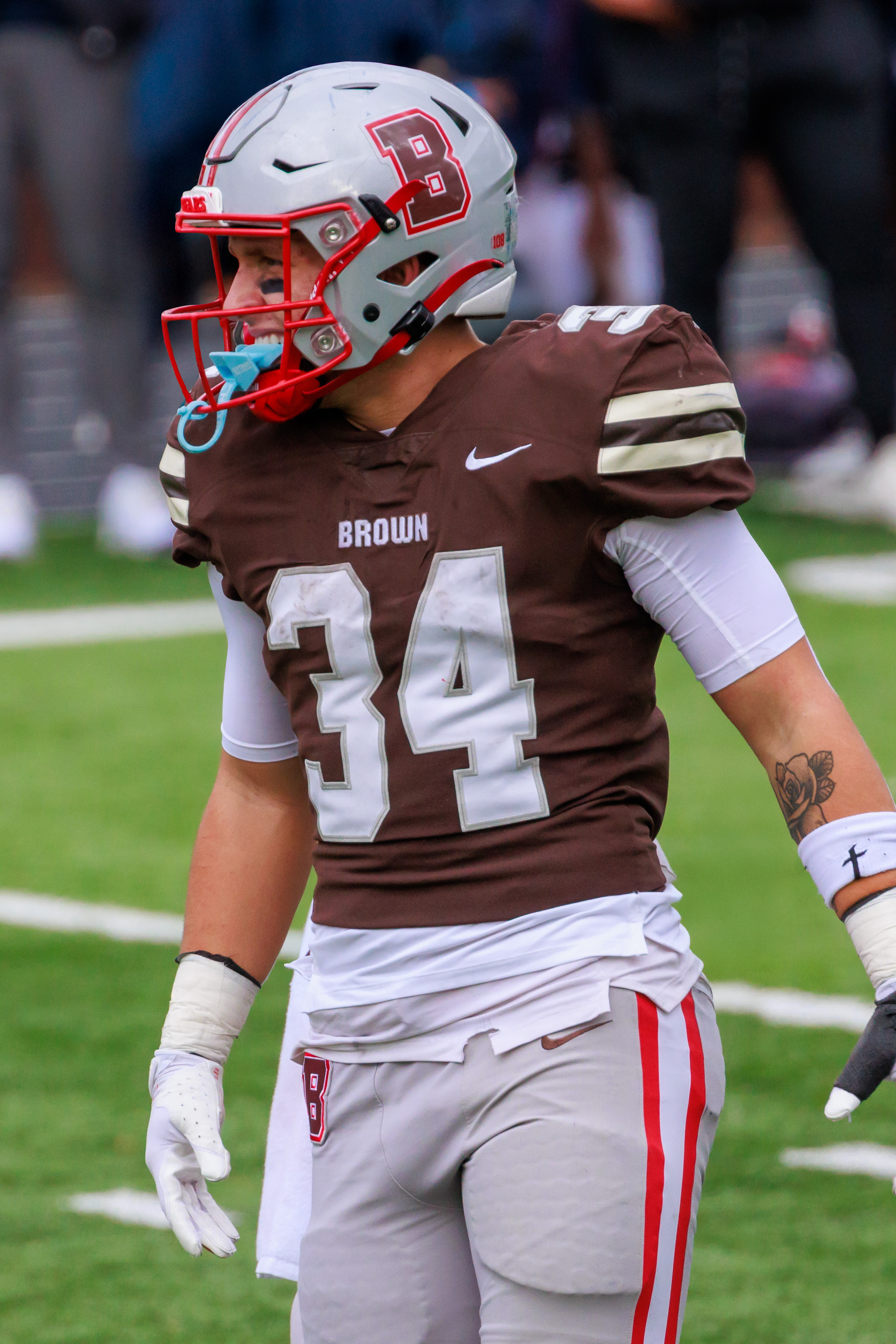
Matt Childs was named Ivy League Rookie of the Year

The 2024 Brown Bears football team represented Brown University as a member of the Ivy League during the 2024 NCAA Division I FCS football season. The Bears were led by fifth-year head coach James Perry and played home games at Richard Gouse Field at Brown Stadium in Providence, Rhode Island.

== Preseason ==
=== Ivy League media poll ===
The Ivy League preseason poll was released on August 5, 2024. The Bears were predicted to finish sixth in the conference.

== Schedule ==
The Brown Bears' 2024 football schedule consists of five away and five home games. Brown will host Ivy League opponents Harvard, Cornell, Penn, and Columbia, and will travel to Princeton, Yale, and Dartmouth. Brown's non-conference opponents will be Georgetown of the Patriot League, Bryant of the Coastal Athletic Association Football Conference, and rival Rhode Island, also of the Coastal Athletic Association Football Conference.

Date	Time	Opponent	Site	TV	Result	Attendance
September 21	1:00 p.m.	at Georgetown*	Cooper Field; Washington, D.C.	ESPN+	W 26–14	2,135
September 28	12:00 p.m.	Harvard	Brown Stadium; Providence, RI	ESPN+	W 31–28	10,753
October 5	12:00 p.m.	Bryant*	Brown Stadium; Providence, RI	ESPN+	L 35–42	3,735
October 12	1:00 p.m.	at No. 19 Rhode Island*	Meade Stadium; Kingstown, RI (rivalry)	FloFootball	L 21–31	5,773
October 18	7:00 p.m.	at Princeton	Princeton Stadium; Princeton, NJ	ESPNU	L 17–29	4,173
October 26	12:00 p.m.	Cornell	Brown Stadium; Providence, RI	ESPN+	W 23–21	7,327
November 2	12:00 p.m.	Penn	Brown Stadium; Providence, RI	ESPN+	L 28–38	5,071
November 9	12:00 p.m.	at Yale	Yale Bowl; New Haven, CT	ESPN+	L 34–56	4,742
November 16	12:00 p.m.	Columbia	Brown Stadium; Providence, RI	ESPN+	L 12–21	2,976
November 23	12:00 p.m.	at Dartmouth	Memorial Field; Hanover, NH	ESPN+	L 28–56	2,769
*Non-conference game; Rankings from STATS Poll released prior to the game; All times are in Eastern time

== Game summaries ==
=== at Georgetown ===
Brown Bears at Georgetown Hoyas – Game summary

Quarter	1	2	3	4	Total
Bears	14	6	6	0	26
Hoyas	7	7	0	0	14

at Cooper Field, Washington, D.C.

- Date: September 21
- Game time: 1:00 p.m. EDT
- Game weather: Sunny, 83 °F (28 °C)
- Game attendance: 2,135
- Referee: Alex Parrella
- TV announcers (ESPN+): Jeremy Huber (play-by-play) and Colleen McNamara (analyst)
- Box score, Recap

Game information
First quarter
- BRWN – Solomon Miller 87-yard pass from Jake Wilcox (Christopher Maron kick), 12:30. Bears 7–0. Drive: 1 play, 87 yards, 0:12.
- GTWN – Naieem Kearney 1-yard run (Patrick Ryan kick), 8:36. Tied 7–7. Drive: 8 plays, 75 yards, 3:54.
- BRWN – Mark Mahoney 45-yard pass from Jake Wilcox (Christopher Maron kick), 6:17. Bears 14–7. Drive: 5 plays, 69 yards, 2:11.

Second quarter

- BRWN – Christopher Maron 24-yard field goal, 6:19. Bears 17–7. Drive: 7 plays, 37 yards, 2:31.
- GTWN – Cam Pygatt 77-yard pass from Danny Lauter (Patrick Ryan kick), 5:02. Bears 17–14. Drive: 3 plays, 83 yards, 1:13.
- BRWN – Christopher Maron 33-yard field goal, 0:00. Bears 20–14. Drive: 16 plays, 60 yards, 5:02.

Third quarter

- BRWN – Jordan DeLucia 1-yard run (pass failed), 1:14. Bears 26–14. Drive: 9 plays, 61 yards, 4:06.

Fourth quarter

- No scoring plays

Statistics	BRWN	GTWN
First downs	21	18
Total yards	372	402
Rushing yards	104	59
Passing yards	268	343
Turnovers	1	3
Time of possession	31:34	28:26

Team	Category	Player	Statistics
Brown	Passing	Jake Wilcox	17/33, 268 yards, 2 TD, INT
Brown	Rushing	Jordan DeLucia	12 rushes, 50 yards, TD
Brown	Receiving	Solomon Miller	3 receptions, 99 yards, TD
Georgetown	Passing	Danny Lauter	27/47, 343 yards, TD, 2 INT
Georgetown	Rushing	Naieem Kearney	11 rushes, 52 yards, TD
Georgetown	Receiving	Cam Pygatt	6 receptions, 116 yards, TD

=== Harvard ===
Harvard Crimson at Brown Bears – Game summary

Quarter	1	2	3	4	Total
Crimson	14	7	7	0	28
Bears	0	10	7	14	31

at Brown Stadium, Providence, Rhode Island

- Date: September 28
- Game time: 12:00 p.m. EDT
- Game weather: Sunny, 73 °F (23 °C)
- Game attendance: 10,753
- Referee: Tom Zetts
- TV announcers (ESPN+): Scott Cordischi (play-by-play) and John Anderson (analyst)
- Box score, Recap

Game information
First quarter
- HARV – Shane McLaughlin 2-yard run (Kieran Corr kick), 5:55. Crimson 7–0. Drive: 6 plays, 48 yards, 2:44.
- HARV – Cooper Barkate 20-yard pass from Jaden Craig (Kieran Corr kick), 0:17. Crimson 14–0. Drive: 8 plays, 67 yards, 4:07.

Second quarter

- BRWN – Christopher Maron 22-yard field goal, 11:17. Crimson 14–3. Drive: 10 plays, 70 yards, 4:00.
- HARV – Cooper Barkate 16-yard pass from Jaden Craig (Kieran Corr kick), 5:59. Crimson 21–3. Drive: 14 plays, 75 yards, 5:18.
- BRWN – Nate Lussier 1-yard run (Christopher Maron kick), 1:55. Crimson 21–10. Drive: 2 plays, 1 yard, 0:08.

Third quarter

- HARV – Jaden Craig 2-yard run (Kieran Corr kick), 6:16. Crimson 28–10. Drive: 9 plays, 80 yards, 3:56.
- BRWN – Matt Childs 75-yard pass from Jake Wilcox (Christopher Maron kick), 5:57. Crimson 28–17. Drive: 2 plays, 75 yards, 0:19.

Fourth quarter

- BRWN – Mark Mahoney 9-yard pass from Jake Wilcox (pass failed), 5:07. Crimson 28–23. Drive: 14 plays, 69 yards, 4:14.
- BRWN – Mark Mahoney 27-yard pass from Jake Wilcox (Jake Wilcox pass to Mark Mahoney), 0:21. Bears 31–28. Drive: 2 plays, 27 yards, 0:07.

Statistics	HARV	BRWN
First downs	20	18
Total yards	299	406
Rushing yards	121	118
Passing yards	178	288
Turnovers	1	0
Time of possession	31:13	28:47

Team	Category	Player	Statistics
Harvard	Passing	Jaden Craig	12/23, 178 yards, 2 TD, INT
Harvard	Rushing	Xaviah Bascon	13 rushes, 63 yards
Harvard	Receiving	Cooper Barkate	6 receptions, 90 yards, 2 TD
Brown	Passing	Jake Wilcox	21/37, 288 yards, 3 TD
Brown	Rushing	Jake Wilcox	12 rushes, 57 yards
Brown	Receiving	Matt Childs	4 receptions, 101 yards, TD

=== Bryant ===
Bryant Bulldogs at Brown Bears – Game summary

Quarter	1	2	3	4	Total
Bulldogs	7	13	0	22	42
Bears	7	7	7	14	35

at Brown Stadium, Providence, Rhode Island

- Date: October 5
- Game time: 12:00 p.m. EDT
- Game weather: Cloudy, 72 °F (22 °C)
- Game attendance: 3,735
- Referee: Antonio Marcella
- TV announcers (ESPN+): Scott Cordischi (play-by-play) and John Anderson Jr. (analyst)
- Box score, Recap

Game information
First quarter
- BRY – Aldrich Doe 31-yard pass from Jarret Guest (Bryce Soli kick), 9:10. Bulldogs 7–0. Drive: 11 plays, 78 yards, 5:44.
- BRWN – Qwentin Brown 1-yard run (Christopher Maron kick), 3:01. Tied 7–7. Drive: 10 plays, 52 yards, 2:57.

Second quarter

- BRWN – Qwentin Brown 1-yard run (Christopher Maron kick), 12:30. Bears 14–7. Drive: 11 plays, 62 yards, 3:46.
- BRY – Landon Ruggieri 18-yard pass from Jarrett Guest (Bryce Soli kick), 8:55. Tied 14–14. Drive: 8 plays, 75 yards, 3:35.
- BRY – Bryce Soli 22-yard field goal, 1:55. Bulldogs 17–14. Drive: 12 plays, 65 yards, 5:38.
- BRY – Bryce Soli 27-yard field goal, 0:01. Bulldogs 20–14. Drive: 9 plays, 42 yards, 1:15.

Third quarter

- BRWN – Qwentin Brown 1-yard run (Christopher Maron kick), 4:54. Bears 21–20. Drive: 11 plays, 93 yards, 4:15.

Fourth quarter

- BRY – Landon Ruggieri 38-yard pass from Jarrett Guest (Bryce Soli kick), 14:20. Bulldogs 27–21. Drive: 6 plays, 70 yards, 2:58.
- BRWN – Matt Childs 58-yard pass from Jake Wilcox (Christopher Maron kick), 12:35. Bears 28–27. Drive: 5 plays, 77 yards, 1:38.
- BRY – Dylan Kedzior 46-yard run (Jarrett Guest run), 10:50. Bulldogs 35–28. Drive: 5 plays, 75 yards, 1:45.
- BRWN – Matt Childs 15-yard run (Christopher Maron kick), 4:37. Tied 35–35. Drive: 11 plays, 98 yards, 4:00.
- BRY – Landon Ruggieri 30-yard pass from Jarrett Guest (Bryce Soli kick), 1:45. Bulldogs 42–35. Drive: 8 plays, 63 yards, 2:44.

Statistics	BRY	BRWN
First downs	25	24
Total yards	517	462
Rushing yards	180	163
Passing yards	337	299
Turnovers	0	1
Time of possession	33:09	26:51

Team	Category	Player	Statistics
Bryant	Passing	Jarrett Guest	26/39, 337 yards, 4 TD
Bryant	Rushing	Dylan Kedzior	11 rushes, 93 yards, TD
Bryant	Receiving	Landon Ruggieri	10 receptions, 190 yards, 3 TD
Brown	Passing	Jake Wilcox	21/38, 294 yards, TD
Brown	Rushing	Matt Childs	8 rushes, 58 yards, TD
Brown	Receiving	Matt Childs	5 receptions, 93 yards, TD

=== at No. 19 Rhode Island ===
Brown Bears at No. 19 Rhode Island Rams – Game summary

Quarter	1	2	3	4	Total
Bears	7	7	7	0	21
No. 19 Rams	14	0	3	14	31

at Meade Stadium, Kingstown, Rhode Island

- Date: October 12
- Game time: 1:00 p.m. EDT
- Game weather: Sunny
- Game attendance: 5,773
- Referee: Jeremy DeAngulo
- TV: FloFootball
- Box score, Recap

Game information
First quarter
- BRWN – Jordan DeLucia 4-yard run (Christopher Maron kick), 13:21. Bears 7–0. Drive: 1 play, 4 yards, 0:30.
- URI – Marquis Buchanan 16-yard pass from Devin Farrell (Ty Groff kick), 6:52. Tied 7–7. Drive: 6 plays, 91 yards, 2:59.
- URI – Malik Grant 2-yard run (Ty Groff kick), 0:28. Rams 14–7. Drive: 11 plays, 57 yards, 3:40.

Second quarter

- BRWN – Jake Wilcox 7-yard run (Christopher Maron kick), 5:20. Tied 14–14. Drive: 11 plays, 66 yards, 5:08.

Third quarter

- BRWN – Qwentin Brown 1-yard run (Christopher Maron kick), 9:02. Bears 21–14. Drive: 14 plays, 75 yards, 5:58.
- URI – Ty Groff 20-yard field goal, 1:38. Bears 21–17. Drive: 14 plays, 77 yards, 7:20.

Fourth quarter

- URI – Shawn Harris Jr. 45-yard run (Ty Groff kick), 12:22. Rams 24–21. Drive: 2 plays, 66 yards, 0:37.
- URI – Devin Farrell 5-yard run (Ty Groff kick), 2:49. Rams 31–21. Drive: 9 plays, 80 yards, 5:55.

Statistics	BRWN	URI
First downs	20	22
Total yards	298	434
Rushing yards	133	190
Passing yards	165	244
Turnovers	2	2
Time of possession	29:20	30:40

Team	Category	Player	Statistics
Brown	Passing	Jake Wilcox	20/30, 165 yards, INT
Brown	Rushing	Matt Childs	12 rushes, 48 yards
Brown	Receiving	Matt Childs	3 receptions, 52 yards
Rhode Island	Passing	Devin Farrell	21/32, 244 yards, TD, 2 INT
Rhode Island	Rushing	Devin Farrell	8 rushes, 65 yards, TD
Rhode Island	Receiving	Marquis Buchanan	9 receptions, 107 yards, TD

=== at Princeton ===
Brown Bears at Princeton Tigers – Game summary

Quarter	1	2	3	4	Total
Bears	0	7	7	3	17
Tigers	12	10	0	7	29

at Princeton Stadium, Princeton, New Jersey

- Date: October 18
- Game time: 7:00 p.m. EDT
- Game weather: Sunny
- Game attendance: 4,173
- Referee: Anthony Florio
- TV announcers (ESPNU): Eric Frede (play-by-play) and Jack Ford (analyst)
- Box score, Recap

Game information
First quarter
- PRIN – John Volker 66-yard run (kick failed), 13:10. Tigers 6–0. Drive: 4 plays, 75 yards, 1:50.
- PRIN – John Volker 7-yard run (pass failed), 5:16. Tigers 12–0. Drive: 11 plays, 90 yards, 5:17.

Second quarter

- PRIN – Blaine Hipa 13-yard run (Sam Massick kick), 12:27. Tigers 19–0. Drive: 3 plays, 13 yards, 0:56.
- BRWN – Solomon Miller 2-yard run (Christopher Maron kick), 8:39. Tigers 19–7. Drive: 10 plays, 75 yards, 3:48.
- PRIN – Sam Massick 28-yard field goal, 7:00. Tigers 22–7. Drive: 5 plays, 64 yards, 1:39.

Third quarter

- BRWN – Qwentin Brown 1-yard run (Christopher Maron kick), 7:18. Tigers 22–14. Drive: 18 plays, 75 yards, 7:42.

Fourth quarter

- BRWN – Christopher Maron 33-yard field goal, 8:17. Tigers 22–17. Drive: 13 plays, 65 yards, 4:52.
- PRIN – Luke Colella 12-yard pass from Blain Hipa (Sam Massick kick), 1:53. Tigers 29–17. Drive: 8 plays, 73 yards, 3:56.

Statistics	BRWN	PRIN
First downs	25	21
Total yards	443	379
Rushing yards	172	179
Passing yards	271	200
Turnovers	5	2
Time of possession	33:25	26:35

Team	Category	Player	Statistics
Brown	Passing	Jake Wilcox	32/50, 271 yards, 3 INT
Brown	Rushing	Jake Wilcox	11 rushes, 55 yards
Brown	Receiving	Chason Barber	2 receptions, 43 yards
Princeton	Passing	Blaine Hipa	15/26, 200 yards, TD, 2 INT
Princeton	Rushing	John Volker	4 rushes, 79 yards, 2 TD
Princeton	Receiving	Luke Colella	6 receptions, 96 yards, TD

=== Cornell ===
Cornell Big Red at Brown Bears – Game summary

Quarter	1	2	3	4	Total
Big Red	7	0	14	0	21
Bears	0	3	7	13	23

at Brown Stadium, Providence, Rhode Island

- Date: October 26
- Game time: 12:00 p.m. EDT
- Game weather: Sunny, 66 °F (19 °C)
- Game attendance: 7,327
- Referee: Cory Hanson
- TV announcers (ESPN+): Scott Cordischi (play-by-play) and John Anderson Jr. (analyst)
- Box score, Recap

Game information
First quarter
- COR – Jameson Wang 10-yard run (Alan Zhao kick), 4:55. Big Red 7–0. Drive: 9 plays, 85 yards, 2:48.

Second quarter

- BRWN – Christopher Maron 44-yard field goal, 14:51. Big Red 7–3. Drive: 15 plays, 49 yards, 5:04.

Third quarter

- COR – Jameson Wang 1-yard run (Alan Zhao kick), 12:05. Big Red 14–3. Drive: 6 plays, 47 yards, 1:52.
- COR – Parker Woodring 17-yard pass from Jameson Wang (Alan Zhao kick), 4:39. Big Red 21–3. Drive: 6 plays, 80 yards, 0:48.
- BRWN – Solomon Miller 38-yard pass from Jake Wilcox (Christopher Maron kick), 2:20. Big Red 21–10. Drive: 7 plays, 75 yards, 2:19.

Fourth quarter

- BRWN – Qwentin Brown 1-yard run (Christopher Maron kick), 11:34. Big Red 21–17. Drive: 12 plays, 98 yards, 4:25.
- BRWN – Christopher Maron 35-yard field goal, 5:24. Big Red 21–20. Drive: 13 plays, 63 yards, 5:06.
- BRWN – Christopher Maron 29-yard field goal, 0:00. Bears 23–21. Drive: 16 plays, 75 yards, 3:45.

Statistics	COR	BRWN
First downs	17	32
Total yards	323	530
Rushing yards	58	214
Passing yards	265	316
Turnovers	0	3
Time of possession	23:31	36:29

Team	Category	Player	Statistics
Cornell	Passing	Jameson Wang	26/49, 265 yards, TD
Cornell	Rushing	Jameson Wang	10 rushes, 41 yards, 2 TD
Cornell	Receiving	Doryn Smith	8 receptions, 99 yards
Brown	Passing	Jake Wilcox	35/49, 316 yards, TD, 3 INT
Brown	Rushing	Stockton Owen	18 rushes, 79 yards
Brown	Receiving	Ben Moseley	8 receptions, 100 yards

=== Penn ===
Penn Quakers at Brown Bears – Game summary

Quarter	1	2	3	4	Total
Quakers	7	14	10	7	38
Bears	0	7	7	14	28

at Brown Stadium, Providence, Rhode Island

- Date: November 2
- Game time: 12:00 p.m. EDT
- Game weather: Sunny, 58 °F (14 °C)
- Game attendance: 5,071
- Referee: Todd Bowman
- TV announcers (ESPN+): Scott Cordischi (play-by-play) and John Anderson Jr. (analyst)
- Box score, Recap

Game information
First quarter
- PENN – Jared Richardson 10-yard pass from Liam O'Brien (Sam Smith kick), 2:04. Quakers 7–0. Drive: 7 plays, 67 yards, 3:24.

Second quarter

- BRWN – Mark Mahoney 31-yard pass from Jake Wilcox (Christopher Maron kick), 9:22. Tied 7–7. Drive: 11 plays, 69 yards, 4:43.
- PENN – Malachi Hosley 25-yard run (Sam Smith kick), 5:05. Quakers 14–7. Drive: 2 plays, 25 yards, 0:12.
- PENN – Liam O'Brien 10-yard run (Sam Smith kick), 0:26. Quakers 21–7. Drive: 10 plays, 70 yards, 3:03.

Third quarter

- PENN – Malachi Hosley 11-yard run (Sam Smith kick), 13:01. Quakers 28–7. Drive: 5 plays, 72 yards, 1:51.
- BRWN – Qwentin Brown 1-yard run (Christopher Maron kick), 8:50. Quakers 28–14. Drive: 11 plays, 72 yards, 4:04.
- PENN – Sam Smith 30-yard field goal, 3:55. Quakers 31–14. Drive: 10 plays, 65 yards, 4:46.

Fourth quarter

- PENN – Justin Cayenne 15-yard pass from Liam O'Brien (Sam Smith kick), 10:49. Quakers 38–14. Drive: 9 plays, 76 yards, 4:23.
- BRWN – Matt Childs 1-yard run (pass failed), 8:30. Quakers 38–20. Drive: 8 plays, 75 yards, 2:19.
- BRWN – Liam O'Brien sacked in own end zone by John Perdue, 7:37. Quakers 38–22.
- BRWN – Solomon Miller 3-yard pass from Jake Wilcox (pass failed), 3:13. Quakers 38–28. Drive: 14 plays, 75 yards, 4:24.

Statistics	PENN	BRWN
First downs	23	26
Total yards	419	441
Rushing yards	172	148
Passing yards	247	293
Turnovers	0	1
Time of possession	29:59	30:01

Team	Category	Player	Statistics
Penn	Passing	Liam O'Brien	18/24, 247 yards, 2 TD
Penn	Rushing	Malachi Hosley	17 rushes, 102 yards, 2 TD
Penn	Receiving	Jared Richardson	7 receptions, 113 yards, TD
Brown	Passing	Jake Wilcox	24/34, 260 yards, 2 TD
Brown	Rushing	Stockton Owen	11 rushes, 58 yards
Brown	Receiving	Mark Mahoney	7 receptions, 85 yards, TD

=== at Yale ===
Brown Bears at Yale Bulldogs – Game summary

Quarter	1	2	3	4	Total
Bears	7	10	9	8	34
Bulldogs	21	14	7	14	56

at Yale Bowl, New Haven, Connecticut

- Date: November 9
- Game time: 12:00 p.m. EST
- Game weather: Sunny, 50 °F (10 °C)
- Game attendance: 4,742
- Referee: Tom Zetts
- TV: ESPN+
- Box score, Recap

Game information
First quarter
- YALE – David Pantelis 9-yard pass from Grant Jordan (Nick Conforti kick), 10:29. Bulldogs 7–0. Drive: 10 plays, 58 yards, 3:59.
- BRWN – Qwentin Brown 1-yard run (Christopher Maron kick), 6:16. Tied 7–7. Drive: 12 plays, 75 yards, 4:13.
- YALE – David Pantelis 25-yard pass from Grant Jordan (Nick Conforti kick), 0:44. Bulldogs 14–7. Drive: 12 plays, 77 yards, 5:23.
- YALE – David Pantelis 29-yard pass from Grant Jordan (Nick Conforti kick), 0:29. Bulldogs 21–7. Drive: 1 play, 29 yards, 0:05.

Second quarter

- YALE – Grant Jordan 2-yard run (Nick Conforti kick), 13:25. Bulldogs 28–7. Drive: 5 plays, 35 yards, 1:36.
- BRWN – Qwentin Brown 1-yard run (Christopher Maron kick), 8:20. Bulldogs 28–14. Drive: 15 plays, 84 yards, 4:59.
- YALE – Ryan Belk 14-yard pass from Grant Jordan (Nick Conforti kick), 5:24. Bulldogs 35–14. Drive: 8 plays, 75 yards, 2:56.
- BRWN – Christopher Maron 22-yard field goal, 0:25. Bulldogs 35–17. Drive: 14 plays, 56 yards, 4:53.

Third quarter

- BRWN – Christopher Maron 34-yard field goal, 9:05. Bulldogs 35–20. Drive: 13 plays, 42 yards, 4:30.
- YALE – Mason Shipp 23-yard pass from Grant Jordan (Nick Conforti kick), 5:45. Bulldogs 42–20. Drive: 9 plays, 75 yards, 3:20.
- BRWN – Mark Mahoney 33-yard pass from Jake Wilcox (pass failed), 2:29. Bulldogs 42–26. Drive: 10 plays, 75 yards, 3:16.

Fourth quarter

- YALE – Mason Shipp 3-yard pass from Grant Jordan (Nick Conforti kick), 13:10. Bulldogs 49–26. Drive: 9 plays, 75 yards, 4:19.
- BRWN – Stockton Owen 15-yard run (James Murphy pass to Solomon Miller), 1:55. Bulldogs 49–34. Drive: 6 plays, 75 yards, 1:16.
- YALE – Tre Peterson 44-yard run (Nick Conforti kick), 1:47. Bulldogs 56–34. Drive: 1 play, 44 yards, 0:07.

Statistics	BRWN	YALE
First downs	33	21
Total yards	459	510
Rushing yards	116	138
Passing yards	343	372
Turnovers	4	1
Time of possession	30:27	29:33

Team	Category	Player	Statistics
Brown	Passing	Jake Wilcox	32/48, 273 yards, TD, 3 INT
Brown	Rushing	Matt Childs	16 rushes, 64 yards
Brown	Receiving	Mark Mahoney	10 receptions, 115 yards, TD
Yale	Passing	Grant Jordan	29/40, 372 yards, 6 TD
Yale	Rushing	Tre Peterson	7 rushes, 66 yards, TD
Yale	Receiving	David Pantelis	12 receptions, 195 yards, 3 TD

=== Columbia ===
Columbia Lions at Brown Bears – Game summary

Quarter	1	2	3	4	Total
Lions	0	7	7	7	21
Bears	0	3	0	9	12

at Brown Stadium, Providence, Rhode Island

- Date: November 16
- Game time: 12:00 p.m. EST
- Game weather: Sunny, 60 °F (16 °C)
- Game attendance: 2,976
- Referee: Bill McKeever
- TV announcers (ESPN+): Scott Cordischi (play-by-play) and John Anderson Jr. (analyst)
- Box score, Recap

Game information
First quarter
- No scoring plays

Second quarter

- COLU – Bryson Canty 55-yard pass from Caleb Sanchez (Hugo Merry kick), 1:13. Lions 7–0. Drive: 3 plays, 73 yards, 0:47.
- BRWN – Christopher Maron 37-yard field goal, 0:00. Lions 7–3. Drive: 2 plays, 10 yards, 0:14.

Third quarter

- COLU – Jordan Kelley 12-yard pass from Caleb Sanchez (Hugo Merry kick), 5:27. Lions 14–3. Drive: 8 plays, 79 yards, 3:32.

Fourth quarter

- COLU – Bryson Canty 52-yard pass from Caleb Sanchez (Hugo Merry kick), 11:52. Lions 21–3. Drive: 3 plays, 53 yards, 1:10.
- BRWN – Christopher Maron 21-yard field goal, 7:11. Lions 21–6. Drive: 13 plays, 72 yards, 4:41.
- BRWN – Ty Pezza 3-yard pass from Jake Wilcox (run failed), 1:37. Lions 21–12. Drive: 13 plays, 80 yards, 3:06.

Statistics	COLU	BRWN
First downs	19	21
Total yards	478	384
Rushing yards	163	94
Passing yards	315	290
Turnovers	1	1
Time of possession	28:32	31:28

Team	Category	Player	Statistics
Columbia	Passing	Caleb Sanchez	12/27, 241 yards, 3 TD
Columbia	Rushing	Joey Giorgi	19 rushes, 107 yards
Columbia	Receiving	Bryson Canty	6 receptions, 183 yards, 2 TD
Brown	Passing	Jake Wilcox	29/40, 242 yards, TD, INT
Brown	Rushing	Jake Wilcox	10 rushes, 47 yards
Brown	Receiving	Mark Mahoney	12 receptions, 120 yards

=== at Dartmouth ===
Brown Bears at Dartmouth Big Green – Game summary

Quarter	1	2	3	4	Total
Bears	0	14	14	0	28
Big Green	7	14	21	14	56

at Memorial Field, Hanover, New Hampshire

- Date: November 23
- Game time: 12:00 p.m. EST
- Game weather: Rain, 42 °F (6 °C)
- Game attendance: 2,769
- Referee: Cory Hanson
- TV announcers (ESPN+): Matt Corsetti (play-by-play) and Brandon Bojarsky (analyst)
- Box score, Recap

Game information
First quarter
- DART – Grayson O'Bara 13-yard pass from Jackson Proctor (Owen Zalc kick), 11:00. Big Green 7–0. Drive: 7 plays, 73 yards, 2:30.

Second quarter

- DART – Painter Richards-Baker 35-yard pass from Jackson Proctor (Owen Zalc kick), 13:31. Big Green 14–0. Drive: 7 plays, 65 yards, 3:38.
- BRWN – Jake Wilcox 2-yard run (Christopher Maron kick), 6:12. Big Green 14–7. Drive: 2 plays, 9 yards, 0:21.
- BRWN – Ty Holtz 1-yard run (Christopher Maron kick), 0:55. Tied 14–14. Drive: 6 plays, 61 yards, 1:47.
- DART – Chris Corbo 20-yard pass from Jackson Proctor (Owen Zalc kick), 0:03. Big Green 21–14. Drive: 6 plays, 75 yards, 0:52.

Third quarter

- DART – Grayson O'Bara 72-yard pass from Jackson Proctor (Owen Zalc kick), 14:06. Big Green 28–14. Drive: 3 plays, 75 yards, 0:54.
- DART – Jordan Washington 57-yard interception return (Owen Zalc kick), 10:45. Big Green 35–14.
- BRWN – Ty Pezza 3-yard pass from James Murphy (Christopher Maron kick), 2:55. Big Green 35–21. Drive: 9 plays, 80 yards, 2:42.
- DART – Jackson Proctor 75-yard run (Owen Zalc kick), 2:32. Big Green 42–21. Drive: 2 plays, 75 yards, 0:17.
- BRWN – Levi Linowes 24-yard pass from James Murphy (Christopher Maron kick), 0:40. Big Green 42–28. Drive: 5 plays, 75 yards, 1:52.

Fourth quarter

- DART – Jackson Proctor 9-yard run (Owen Zalc kick), 13:00. Big Green 49–28. Drive: 6 plays, 75 yards, 2:40.
- DART – Jackson Proctor 2-yard run (Owen Zalc kick), 6:30. Big Green 56–28. Drive: 8 plays, 60 yards, 4:53.

Statistics	BRWN	DART
First downs	23	24
Total yards	435	594
Rushing yards	74	286
Passing yards	361	308
Turnovers	2	0
Time of possession	31:46	28:14

Team	Category	Player	Statistics
Brown	Passing	James Murphy	25/36, 256 yards, 2 TD, INT
Brown	Rushing	Jake Wilcox	4 rushes, 25 yards, TD
Brown	Receiving	Ben Moseley	4 receptions, 80 yards
Dartmouth	Passing	Jackson Proctor	18/26, 308 yards, 4 TD
Dartmouth	Rushing	Jackson Proctor	13 rushes, 171 yards, 3 TD
Dartmouth	Receiving	Grayson O'Bara	4 receptions, 124 yards, 2 TD
