= 2024 Harvard Crimson football team =

American college football season

2024 Harvard Crimson football

Ivy League co-champion
- Conference: Ivy League

Ranking
- STATS: No. 25
- Record: 8–2 (5–2 Ivy)
- Head coach: Andrew Aurich (1st season)
- Offensive coordinator: Mickey Fein (4th season)
- Offensive scheme: Pro spread
- Defensive coordinator: Scott Larkee (15th season)
- Base defense: 4–3
- Captain: Shane McLaughlin
- Home stadium: Harvard Stadium

2024 Ivy League football standings
	Conf.			Overall
Team	W		L	W		L
Dartmouth +	5	–	2	8	–	2
No. 25 Harvard +	5	–	2	8	–	2
Columbia +	5	–	2	7	–	3
Yale	4	–	3	7	–	3
Cornell	3	–	4	4	–	6
Penn	2	–	5	4	–	6
Brown	2	–	5	3	–	7
Princeton	2	–	5	3	–	7
+ – Conference co-champions; Rankings from STATS Poll

The 2024 Harvard Crimson football team represented Harvard University as a member of the Ivy League during the 2024 NCAA Division I FCS football season. The team played its home games at Harvard Stadium in Boston and was led by first-year head coach Andrew Aurich.

== Schedule ==
Date	Time	Opponent	Rank	Site	TV	Result	Attendance
September 21	12:00 p.m.	Stetson*		Harvard Stadium; Boston, MA	ESPN+	W 35–0	4,488
September 28	12:00 p.m.	at Brown		Brown Stadium; Providence, RI	ESPN+	L 28–31	10,753
October 4	7:00 p.m.	No. 21 New Hampshire*		Harvard Stadium; Boston, MA	NESN/ESPN+	W 28–23	8,676
October 11	6:00 p.m.	at Cornell		Schoellkopf Field; Ithaca, NY	ESPNU	W 38–20	5,642
October 19	12:00 p.m.	Holy Cross*		Harvard Stadium; Boston, MA	ESPN+	W 35–34	6,950
October 26	3:00 p.m.	Princeton		Harvard Stadium; Boston, MA (rivalry)	ESPN+	W 45–13	12,244
November 2	1:30 p.m.	at No. 22 Dartmouth		Memorial Field; Hanover, NH (rivalry)	ESPN+	W 31–27	7,711
November 9	12:00 p.m.	Columbia	No. 24	Harvard Stadium; Boston, MA	ESPN+	W 26–6	7,011
November 16	1:00 p.m.	at Penn	No. 20	Franklin Field; Philadelphia, PA (rivalry)	ESPN+	W 31–28	12,286
November 23	12:00 p.m.	Yale	No. 17	Harvard Stadium; Boston, MA (rivalry)	ESPNU	L 29–34	27,105
*Non-conference game; Rankings from STATS Poll released prior to the game; All times are in Eastern time

== Rankings ==
Ranking movements Legend: ██ Increase in ranking ██ Decrease in ranking — = Not ranked RV = Received votes т = Tied with team above or below
	Week														
Poll	Pre	1	2	3	4	5	6	7	8	9	10	11	12	13	Final
STATS	RV	RV	RV	RV	RV	—	RV	RV	RV	RV	24	20	17	25	25
Coaches'	RV	RV	RV	—	RV	—	RV	—	—	—	25	22	21т	RV	RV

== Preseason ==
=== Ivy League media poll ===
The Ivy League preseason poll was released on August 5, 2024. The Crimson were predicted to finish second in the conference.

== Game summaries ==
=== Stetson ===
Game One – Stetson Hatters (2–1) vs Harvard Crimson (0–0) – Game summary

Quarter	1	2	3	4	Total
Hatters	0	0	0	0	0
Crimson	21	7	7	0	35

at Harvard Stadium, Boston, Massachusetts

- Date: Saturday September 21, 2024
- Game time: 12:00 PM
- Game attendance: 4,488
- TV announcers (ESPN+): Alex Vispoli (play-by-play), Tyler Davey (analyst) and Amanda Keane (sideline)

Game information

First quarter
Second quarter
Third quarter
Fourth quarter

Statistics	STET	HARV
First downs	8	23
Total yards	101	368
Rushing yards	16	136
Passing yards	85	232
Passing: Comp–Att–Int	15-32-2	13-22-0
Time of possession	23:34	36:26

Team	Category	Player	Statistics
Stetson	Passing	Trip Maxwell	15/32, 85 yards, 2 INT
Stetson	Rushing	Trey Clark	11 carries, 25 yards
Stetson	Receiving	Wyatt Rogers	5 receptions, 35 yards
Harvard	Passing	Jaden Craig	12/20, 217 yards, 3 TD
Harvard	Rushing	Shane McLaughlin	16 carries, 64 yards, 1 TD
Harvard	Receiving	Cooper Barkate	4 receptions, 76 yards, 1 TD

=== at Brown ===
Game Two – Harvard Crimson (1–0) vs Brown Bears (1–0) – Game summary

Quarter	1	2	3	4	Total
Crimson	14	7	7	0	28
Bears	0	10	7	14	31

at Brown Stadium • Providence, RI

- Date: September 28, 2024
- Game time: 12:00 p.m.
- Game weather: Sunny, 73 °F (23 °C)
- Game attendance: 10,753
- Referee: Tom Zetts
- TV announcers (ESPN+): Scott Cordischi (play-by-play) and John Anderson (analyst)

Game information

First quarter

- HARV – Shane McLaughlin 2-yard run (Kieran Corr kick), 5:55. Crimson 7–0. Drive: 6 plays, 48 yards, 2:44.
- HARV – Cooper Barkate 20-yard pass from Jaden Craig (Kieran Corr kick), 0:17. Crimson 14–0. Drive: 8 plays, 67 yards, 4:07.

Second quarter

- BRWN – Christopher Maron 22-yard field goal, 11:17. Crimson 14–3. Drive: 10 plays, 70 yards, 4:00.
- HARV – Cooper Barkate 16-yard pass from Jaden Craig (Kieran Corr kick), 5:59. Crimson 21–3. Drive: 14 plays, 75 yards, 5:18.
- BRWN – Nate Lussier 1-yard run (Christopher Maron kick), 1:55. Crimson 21–10. Drive: 2 plays, 1 yard, 0:08.

Third quarter

- HARV – Jaden Craig 2-yard run (Kieran Corr kick), 6:16. Crimson 28–10. Drive: 9 plays, 80 yards, 3:56.
- BRWN – Matt Childs 75-yard pass from Jake Wilcox (Christopher Maron kick), 5:57. Crimson 28–17. Drive: 2 plays, 75 yards, 0:19.

Fourth quarter

- BRWN – Mark Mahoney 9-yard pass from Jake Wilcox (pass failed), 5:07. Crimson 28–23. Drive: 14 plays, 69 yards, 4:14.
- BRWN – Mark Mahoney 27-yard pass from Jake Wilcox (Jake Wilcox pass to Mark Mahoney), 0:21. Bears 31–28. Drive: 2 plays, 27 yards, 0:07.

Statistics	HARV	BRWN
First downs	20	18
Total yards	299	406
Rushing yards	121	118
Passing yards	178	288
Passing: Comp–Att–Int	12–24–1	21–39–0
Time of possession	31:13	28:47

Team	Category	Player	Statistics
Harvard	Passing	Jaden Craig	12/23, 178 yards, 2 TD, INT
Harvard	Rushing	Xaviah Bascon	13 carries, 63 yards
Harvard	Receiving	Cooper Barkate	6 receptions, 90 yards, 2 TD
Brown	Passing	Jake Wilcox	21/37, 288 yards, 3 TD
Brown	Rushing	Jake Wilcox	12 carries, 57 yards
Brown	Receiving	Matt Childs	4 receptions, 101 yards, TD

=== No. 21 New Hampshire ===
Game Three – No. 21 New Hampshire Wildcats (3–1) vs Harvard Crimson (1–1) – Game summary

Quarter	1	2	3	4	Total
No. 21 Wildcats	7	9	0	7	23
Crimson	0	14	7	7	28

at Harvard Stadium, Boston, Massachusetts

- Date: Friday October 4, 2024
- Game time: 7:00 PM
- Game weather: Cloudy • Temperature: 66 °F (19 °C) • Wind: S 5 mph
- Game attendance: 8,676
- Referee: Alex Parrella
- TV announcers (ESPN+): Alex Vispoli (play-by-play), Tyler Davey (analyst) and Amanda Keane (sideline)

Game information

First quarter

- (6:39) UNH – Caleb Burke 14-yard pass from Seth Morgan, Nick Mazzie kick (Drive: 10 plays, 82 yards, 5:35; New Hampshire 7–0)

Second quarter

- (12:41) UNH – Nick Mazzie 52-yard field goal (Drive: 11 plays, 40 yards, 5:52; New Hampshire 10–0)
- (11:59) HAR – Scott Woods II 65-yard pass from Jaden Craig, Dylan Fingersh kick (Drive: 2 plays, 75 yards, 0:42; New Hampshire 10–7)
- (8:11) UNH – Nick Mazzie 29-yard field goal (Drive: 7 plays, 64 yards, 3:43; New Hampshire 13–7)
- (4:08) HAR – Xaviah Bascon 1-yard run, Kieran Corr kick (Drive: 3 plays, 54 yards, 1:07; Harvard 14–13)
- (0:00) UNH – Nick Mazzie 43-yard field goal (Drive: 10 plays, 69 yards, 1:57; New Hampshire 16–14)

Third quarter

- (5:11) HAR – Xaviah Bascon 1-yard run, Kieran Corr kick (Drive: 10 plays, 55 yards, 5:47; Harvard 21–16)

Fourth quarter

- (11:23) HAR – Charles DePrima 16-yard run, Kieran Corr kick (Drive: 9 plays, 58 yards, 4:20; Harvard 28–16)
- (5:54) UNH – Logan Tomlinson 3-yard pass from Seth Morgan, Nick Mazzie kick (Drive: 14 plays, 73 yards, 5:21; Harvard 28–23)

Statistics	UNH	HARV
First downs	20	17
Total yards	319	348
Rushing yards	46	144
Passing yards	273	204
Passing: Comp–Att–Int	35–48–0	10–23–0
Time of possession	30:38	29:22

Team	Category	Player	Statistics
New Hampshire	Passing	Seth Morgan	34/47, 267 yards, 2 TD
New Hampshire	Rushing	Isaac Seide	10 carries, 204 yards, TD
New Hampshire	Receiving	Logan Tomlinson	10 receptions, 105 yards, TD
Harvard	Passing	Jaden Craig	10/23, 204 yards, TD
Harvard	Rushing	Xaviah Bascon	16 carries, 66 yards, 2 TD
Harvard	Receiving	Scott Woods II	4 receptions, 93 yards, TD

=== at Cornell ===
Game Four – Harvard Crimson (2–1) vs Cornell Big Red (1–2) – Game summary

Quarter	1	2	3	4	Total
Crimson	10	21	7	0	38
Big Red	7	7	6	0	20

at Schoellkopf Field • Ithaca, NY

- Date: Friday October 11, 2024
- Game time: 6:00 p.m.
- Game weather: Sunny • Temperature: 62 °F (17 °C) • Wind: SW 5 mph
- Game attendance: 5,642
- Referee: C. Hanson
- TV announcers (ESPNU): Eric Frede (play-by-play) and Jack Ford (analyst)

Game information

First quarter
Second quarter
Third quarter
Fourth quarter

Statistics	HARV	COR
First downs		
Total yards		
Rushing yards		
Passing yards		
Passing: Comp–Att–Int		
Time of possession		

Team	Category	Player	Statistics
Harvard	Passing		
Harvard	Rushing		
Harvard	Receiving		
Cornell	Passing		
Cornell	Rushing		
Cornell	Receiving		

=== Holy Cross ===
Game Five – Holy Cross Crusaders (3–4) at Harvard Crimson (3–1) – Game summary

Quarter	1	2	3	4	Total
Crusaders	0	0	0	0	0
Crimson	0	0	0	0	0

at Harvard Stadium, Boston, Massachusetts

- Date: Saturday October 19, 2024
- Game time: 12:00 p.m.
- Game weather: 0 °F (−18 °C)
- TV: ESPN+

Game information

First quarter
Second quarter
Third quarter
Fourth quarter

Statistics	HC	HARV
First downs		
Total yards		
Rushing yards		
Passing yards		
Passing: Comp–Att–Int		
Time of possession		

Team	Category	Player	Statistics
Holy Cross	Passing		
Holy Cross	Rushing		
Holy Cross	Receiving		
Harvard	Passing		
Harvard	Rushing		
Harvard	Receiving		

=== Princeton ===
Game Six – Princeton Tigers (2–3) vs Harvard Crimson (4–1) – Game summary

Quarter	1	2	3	4	Total
Tigers	7	3	3	0	13
Crimson	14	10	0	21	45

at Harvard Stadium, Boston, Massachusetts

- Date: Saturday October 26, 2024
- Game time: 3:00 p.m.
- Game attendance: 12,244
- TV announcers (ESPN+): TBD

Game information

First quarter
Second quarter
Third quarter
Fourth quarter

Statistics	PRIN	HARV
First downs		
Total yards		
Rushing yards		
Passing yards		
Passing: Comp–Att–Int		
Time of possession		

Team	Category	Player	Statistics
Princeton	Passing		
Princeton	Rushing		
Princeton	Receiving		
Harvard	Passing		
Harvard	Rushing		
Harvard	Receiving		

=== at No. 22 Dartmouth ===
Game Seven – Harvard Crimson (5–1) vs No. 22 Dartmouth Big Green (6–0) – Game summary

Quarter	1	2	3	4	Total
Crimson	0	0	0	0	0
No. 22 Big Green	0	0	0	0	0

at Memorial Field • Hanover, NH

- Date: Saturday November 2, 2024
- Game time: 1:30 p.m.
- Game weather: 0 °F (−18 °C)
- TV announcers (ESPN+): TBD

Game information

First quarter
Second quarter
Third quarter
Fourth quarter

Statistics	HARV	DART
First downs		
Total yards		
Rushing yards		
Passing yards		
Passing: Comp–Att–Int		
Time of possession		

Team	Category	Player	Statistics
Harvard	Passing		
Harvard	Rushing		
Harvard	Receiving		
Dartmouth	Passing		
Dartmouth	Rushing		
Dartmouth	Receiving		

=== Columbia ===
Game Eight – Columbia Lions (5–2) at No. 24 Harvard Crimson (6–1) – Game summary

Quarter	1	2	3	4	Total
Lions	0	0	0	0	0
No. 24 Crimson	0	0	0	0	0

at Harvard Stadium, Boston, Massachusetts

- Date: Saturday November 9, 2024
- Game time: 12:00 p.m.
- TV: ESPN+

Game information

First quarter
Second quarter
Third quarter
Fourth quarter

Statistics	COLU	HARV
First downs		
Total yards		
Rushing yards		
Passing yards		
Passing: Comp–Att–Int		
Time of possession		

Team	Category	Player	Statistics
Columbia	Passing		
Columbia	Rushing		
Columbia	Receiving		
Harvard	Passing		
Harvard	Rushing		
Harvard	Receiving		

=== at Penn ===
Game Nine – No. 20 Harvard Crimson (7–1) vs Penn Quakers (4–4) – Game summary

Quarter	1	2	3	4	Total
No. 20 Crimson	0	0	0	0	0
Quakers	0	0	0	0	0

at Franklin Field • Philadelphia, PA

- Date: Saturday November 16, 2024
- Game time: 1:00 p.m.
- Game weather: 0 °F (−18 °C)
- TV announcers (ESPN+): TBD

Game information

First quarter
Second quarter
Third quarter
Fourth quarter

Statistics	HARV	PENN
First downs		
Total yards		
Rushing yards		
Passing yards		
Passing: Comp–Att–Int		
Time of possession		

Team	Category	Player	Statistics
Harvard	Passing		
Harvard	Rushing		
Harvard	Receiving		
Penn	Passing		
Penn	Rushing		
Penn	Receiving		

=== Yale ===
Game Ten – Yale Bulldogs (6–3) at No. 17 Harvard Crimson (8–1) – Game summary

Quarter	1	2	3	4	Total
Bulldogs	0	14	10	10	34
No. 17 Crimson	0	7	0	22	29

at Harvard Stadium, Boston, Massachusetts

- Date: Saturday November 23, 2024
- Game time: 12:00 p.m.
- Game weather: Cloudy • Temperature: 45 °F (7 °C) • Wind: NW 14 mph
- Game attendance: 27,105
- Referee: Jeff Pumphrey
- TV announcers (ESPNU): Eric Frede (play-by-play) and Jack Ford (analyst)

Game information

First quarter

- No Scoring

Second quarter

- (12:38) YALE - Chase Nenad 13 yd pass from Grant Jordan (Nick Conforti kick), (Drive 8 plays, 75 yards, 03:54; 7-0 Yale)
- (06:24) HAR - Cooper Barkate 44 yd pass from Jaden Craig (Kieran Corr kick), (Drive 2 plays, 44 yards, 00:33; 7-7 Tied)
- (04:00) YALE - Josh Pitsenberger 11 yd run (Nick Conforti kick), (Drive 5 plays, 76 yards, 02:19; 14-7 Yale)

Third quarter

- (13:47) YALE - Abu Kamara 35 yd interception (Nick Conforti kick), (21-7 Yale)
- (00:57) YALE - Nick Conforti 30 yd field goal, (Drive 13 plays, 69 yards, 06:57; 24-7 Yale)

Fourth quarter

- (14:52) HAR - Scott Woods II 28 yd pass from Jaden Craig (Jaden Craig pass), (Drive 4 plays, 71 yards, 00:57; 24-15 Yale
- (12:41) YALE - Josh Pitsenberger 39 yd pass from Grant Jordan (Nick Conforti kick), (Drive 6 plays, 71 yards, 02:04; 31-15 Yale)
- (08:58) HAR - Cooper Barkate 5 yd pass from Jaden Craig (Scott Woods II pass), (Drive 8 plays, 75 yards, 03:43; 31-23 Yale)
- (02:07) YALE - Nick Conforti 36 yd field goal, (Drive 6 plays, 20 yards, 02:28; 34-23 Yale)
- (00:18) HAR - Xaviah Bascon 5 yd run (Two point play failed), (Drive 11 plays, 75 yards, 01:49; 34-29 Yale)

Statistics	YALE	HARV
First downs	22	19
Total yards	503	349
Rushing yards	216	57
Passing yards	287	292
Passing: Comp–Att–Int	17–31–0	21–45–1
Time of possession	37:36	22:24

Team	Category	Player	Statistics
Yale	Passing	Grant Jordan	17/31, 287 yards, 2 TD
Yale	Rushing	Josh Pitsenberger	25 carries, 120 yards, TD
Yale	Receiving	David Pantelis	7 receptions, 148 yards
Harvard	Passing	Jaden Craig	21/45, 292 yards, 3 TD, INT
Harvard	Rushing	Shane McLaughlin	6 carries, 35 yards
Harvard	Receiving	Cooper Barkate	8 receptions, 169 yards, 2 TD

== Roster ==
2024 Harvard Crimson football team roster
Players
Coaches
Offense

Pos.	#	Name	Class
QB	1	Jaden Craig	Jr
WR	2	Dean Boyd	Jr
QB	3	Dante Torres	So
QB	4	Connor Easthope	Sr
RB	5	Shane McLaughlin	Sr
WR	6	Scott Woods II	Sr
WR	7	Kaedyn Odermann	Sr
WR	8	Isaiah Kacyvenski Jr.	So
QB	10	DJ Gordon	Fr
RB	11	Xaviah Bascon	So
QB	12	Sam Kaiser	Fr
QB	14	Ty Fein	Fr
WR	15	Cayden Coffman	Jr
QB	16	Charles DePrima	Sr
TE	17	Jordan Dotson	Jr
WR	18	Cooper Barkate	Jr
WR	19	Brady Blackburn	Fr
WR	21	Ryan Mooney	So
RB	24	Malik Frederic	Sr
RB	25	Kyle Johnson	So
RB	27	Isaiah Abbey	Jr
RB	28	Maddux Reid	Fr
TE	29	Sam Talaga	Fr
RB	31	Mekhi Moore	Jr
TE	42	Logan Reaska	So
TE	47	Leo Li	So
OL	51	Brandon Sullivan	Fr
OL	52	Aidan Kilstorm	Jr
OL	53	Jack Gentle	Sr
OL	54	Peter O'Mara	So
OL	55	Derek Osman	Jr
OL	56	Logan Demchyk	Fr
OL	60	Nihaal Rana	Fr
OL	62	Derek Thompson	So
OL	65	Enzo Agostini	Fr
OL	66	Dominik Di Filippo	So
OL	67	Davis McKenna	Sr
OL	68	Austin Gentle	Sr
OL	70	Mike Entwistle	Sr
OL	71	Thomas O'Brien	So
OL	73	Madden Santiago	Fr
OL	74	Ryan Adams	Jr
OL	75	Jackson Newville	Jr
OL	76	Max Bowman	Jr
OL	77	Spencer Doan	So
OL	78	Carter Daly	Jr
WR	80	Camren Ware	Fr
TE	81	Seamus Gilmartin	So
TE	82	Scott Giuliano	Sr
WR	83	Ryan Parker	Fr
TE	84	Sanders Daniell	Fr
TE	85	Carter Ladd	Fr
TE	86	Ryan Osborne	Jr
TE	87	Justin Leszynski	Sr
WR	88	Luke Travaglini	Fr
WR	89	Michael Murphy	Fr

Defense

Pos.	#	Name	Class
DB	0	Gavin Shipman	Sr
S	1	Delian Bradley	Jr
DB	2	Ameer Dudley	Sr
LB	3	Eric Little	Sr
DB	4	John Chung	So
DB	7	Damien Henderson	So
DE	8	Josh Fedd	So
DB	9	Langston Rogers	So
DB	10	Jack Donahoe	So
DB	12	Austin-Jake Guillory	So
DB	15	Xaden Benson	Fr
DB	16	DJ Thomas	Fr
DB	19	Trey Thomas	Fr
LB	20	Marcus Alexander	Sr
S	21	Ty Bartrum	Jr
DB	22	Myles Wiley	Sr
DB	23	Kennard McGuire Jr.	Fr
DB	25	Cristopher Ramirez	Fr
DB	27	A. J. Lopez	Jr
LB	30	Owen Johnson	So
LB	31	Will Troutman	Sr
DB	32	Ben Abercrombie	Sr
LB	34	Dorsey Benefield	Fr
LB	35	Sean Line	So
DB	36	Omari Gayles	Fr
S	37	Conor Walsh	So
LB	38	Jaeden Kinlock	Jr
LB	39	Mitchell Gonser	Sr
DL	40	Cam Walker	Fr
LB	42	Oreck Frazier	Sr
LB	44	Aaron McDonald	So
LB	45	Ben Alvarez	Fr
LB	46	Jack Kirkwood	Jr
DL	50	Max Wang	Fr
LB	52	Brock Lockinar	Sr
DL	57	Chris Gorman	Fr
DL	59	Jacinto Lopez	So
DL	62	Kwaku Adubofour	Sr
DL	64	Griffin Egan	Fr
DL	79	Alex DeGrieck	Jr
DL	83	Christian Nwosu	Fr
DE	87	Jack Crowley	So
DL	88	Stephen Scourtis	So
DL	90	Nick Yagodich	Sr
DL	91	Conway Zhang	So
DT	92	Tyler Huenemann	Sr
DL	93	Chris Ramundo	Sr
DE	94	Jacob Psyk	Sr
DL	95	Collin Richardson	Sr
DL	96	Dominic Young-Smith	Sr
DL	97	Brandon Svets	Sr
DE	98	Jake Darling	So
DT	99	Xavier Agostino	Jr

Special teams

Pos.	#	Name	Class
P, K	13	Sebastien Tasko	Sr
P, K	48	Kieran Corr	Fr
P, K	92	Dylan Fingersh	Fr

Head coach

- Andrew Aurich

Coordinators/assistant coaches

- Scott Larkee
  Defensive coordinator/Linebackers
- Mickey Fein
  Offensive coordinator/Quarterbacks
- Ryan Crawford
  Defensive backs
- Steven Williams
  Special teams coordinator/wide receivers
- Jim Jackson
  Offensive line
- Logan Johnson
  Defensive line
- Drew Jacobs
  Safeties
- Lazaro Mitjans Jr.
  Running backs
- Cinjun Erskine
  Tight ends
- Joel Lamb
  Director of recruiting strategy and alumni engagement

Legend

- (C) Team captain
- (S) Suspended
- (I) Ineligible
- Injured
- Redshirt

Roster
Last update: December 1, 2024
