= 2024 Columbia Lions football team =

American college football season

2024 Columbia Lions football

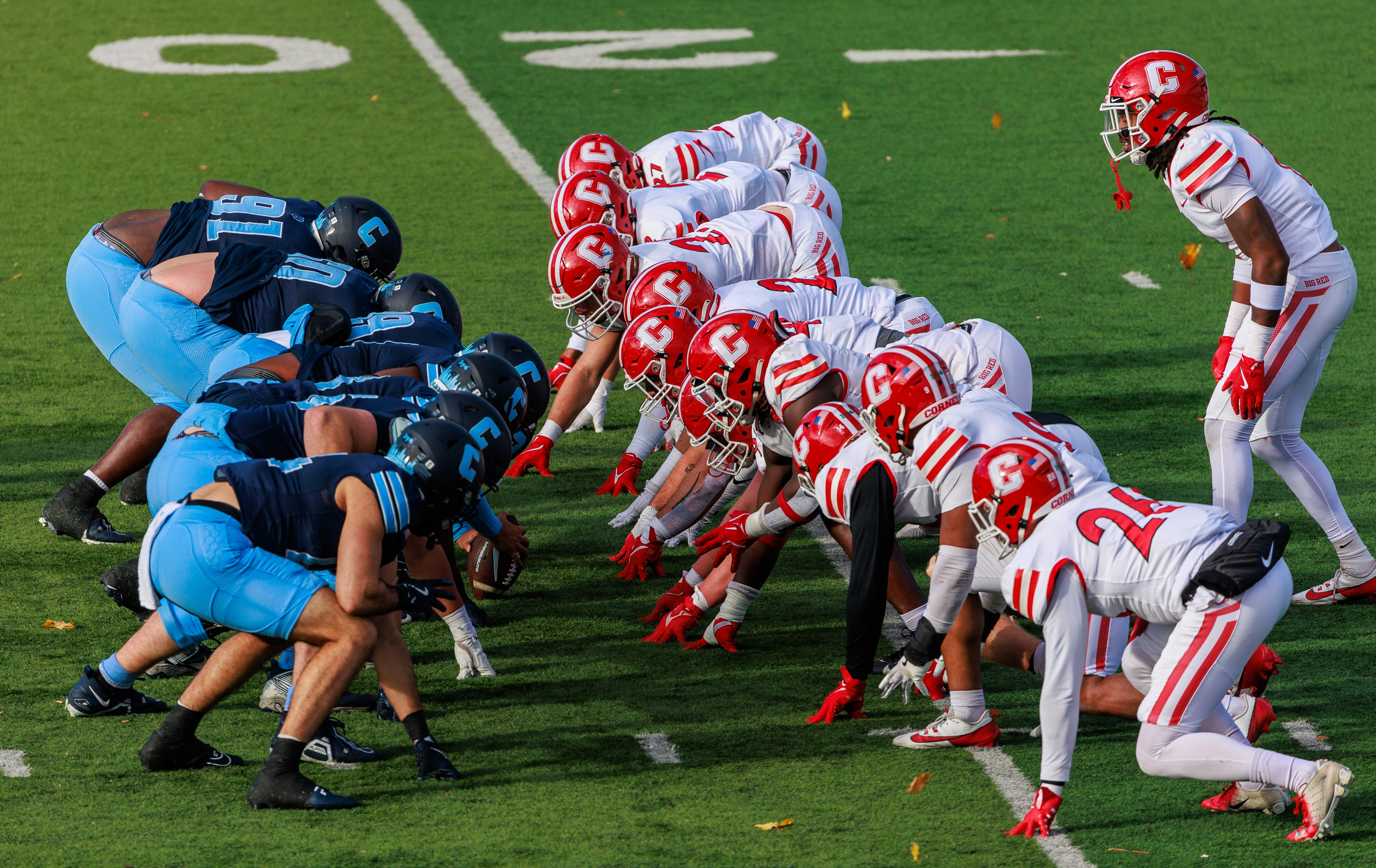
- The Lions beat Cornell, 17–9

Ivy League co-champion
- Conference: Ivy League
- Record: 7–3 (5–2 Ivy)
- Head coach: Jon Poppe (1st season)
- Offensive coordinator: Seitu Smith (1st season)
- Offensive scheme: Pro-style
- Defensive coordinator: Justin Stovall (3rd season)
- Base defense: 3–3–5
- Home stadium: Robert K. Kraft Field at Lawrence A. Wien Stadium

2024 Ivy League football standings
	Conf.			Overall
Team	W		L	W		L
Dartmouth +	5	–	2	8	–	2
No. 25 Harvard +	5	–	2	8	–	2
Columbia +	5	–	2	7	–	3
Yale	4	–	3	7	–	3
Cornell	3	–	4	4	–	6
Penn	2	–	5	4	–	6
Brown	2	–	5	3	–	7
Princeton	2	–	5	3	–	7
+ – Conference co-champions; Rankings from STATS Poll

The 2024 Columbia Lions football team represented Columbia University as a member of the Ivy League during 2024 NCAA Division I FCS football season. The Lions were led by first-year head coach Jon Poppe and played home games at Robert K. Kraft Field at Lawrence A. Wien Stadium. Columbia finished the season 7–3 (5–2 in the Ivy League), to win its first Ivy League title since 1961.

== Schedule ==
Date	Time	Opponent	Site	TV	Result	Attendance
September 21	12:00 p.m.	No. 18 Lafayette*	Robert K. Kraft Field at Lawrence A. Wien Stadium; New York, NY	ESPN+	W 31–20	3,592
September 28	12:30 p.m.	at Georgetown*	Cooper Field; Washington, D.C. (Lou Little Cup)	ESPN+	L 17–20	3,359
October 5	12:00 p.m.	Princeton	Wien Stadium; New York, NY	ESPN+	W 34–17	4,111
October 12	12:00 p.m.	at Wagner*	Wagner College Stadium; Staten Island, NY	NEC Front Row	W 24–6	2,637
October 19	1:00 p.m.	at Penn	Franklin Field; Philadelphia, PA	ESPN+	W 23–17	2,970
October 26	1:30 p.m.	No. 22 Dartmouth^{†}	Wien Stadium; New York, NY	ESPN+	L 21–24	12,642
November 1	7:00 p.m.	Yale	Wien Stadium; New York, NY	ESPNU	W 13–10	3,560
November 9	12:00 p.m.	at No. 24 Harvard	Harvard Stadium; Boston, MA	ESPN+	L 6–26	7,011
November 16	12:00 p.m.	at Brown	Brown Stadium; Providence, RI	ESPN+	W 21–12	2,976
November 23	12:00 p.m.	Cornell	Wien Stadium; New York, NY (rivalry)	ESPN+	W 17–9	4,224
*Non-conference game; ^{†}Homecoming; Rankings from STATS Poll released prior to the game; All times are in Eastern time

== Game summaries ==
=== No. 18 Lafayette ===
Game One – No. 18 Lafayette Leopards (2–1) vs Columbia Lions (0–0) – Game summary

Quarter	1	2	3	4	Total
No. 18 Leopards	0	0	0	0	0
Lions	0	0	0	0	0

at Robert K. Kraft Field at Lawrence A. Wien Stadium, New York, NY

- Date: Saturday September 21, 2024
- Game time: 12:00 PM
- TV announcers (ESPN+): TBD

Game information

First quarter
Second quarter
Third quarter
Fourth quarter

Statistics	LAF	COLU
First downs		
Total yards		
Rushing yards		
Passing yards		
Passing: Comp–Att–Int		
Time of possession		

Team	Category	Player	Statistics
Lafayette	Passing		
Lafayette	Rushing		
Lafayette	Receiving		
Columbia	Passing		
Columbia	Rushing		
Columbia	Receiving		

=== at Georgetown ===
Game Two – Columbia Lions (1–0) at Georgetown Hoyas (2–2) – Game summary

Quarter	1	2	3	4	Total
Lions	7	7	0	3	17
Hoyas	0	7	6	7	20

at Cooper Field • Washington, DC

- Date: September 28, 2024
- Game time: 12:30 p.m.
- Game weather: 0 °F (−18 °C)
- Game attendance: 3,359
- TV: ESPN+

Game information

First quarter

- COLU – Bryson Canty 1 Yd pass from Cole Freeman (Hugo Merry Kick), 4:34. Lions 7–0. Drive: 8 plays, 67 yards, 3:22.

Second quarter

- COLU – Edan Stagg 43 Yd pass from Cole Freeman (Hugo Merry Kick), 8:40. Lions 14–0. Drive: 11 plays, 98 yards, 6:10.
- GTWN – Bryce Cox 4 Yd Run (Patrick Ryan Kick), 4:02. Lions 14–7. Drive: 8 plays, 76 yards, 4:32.

Third quarter

- GTWN – Nicholas Dunneman 32 Yd pass from Danny Lauter (Patrick Ryan PAT failed), 0:01. Lions 14–13. Drive: 6 plays, 76 yards, 2:27.

Fourth quarter

- COLU – Hugo Merry 23 Yd Field Goal, 5:05. Lions 17–13. Drive: 16 plays, 82 yards, 9:55.
- GTWN – Nicholas Dunneman 16 Yd pass from Danny Lauter (Patrick Ryan Kick), 1:10. Hoyas 20–14. Drive: 8 plays, 73 yards, 3:46.

Statistics	COLU	GTWN
First downs	21	17
Total yards	378	345
Rushing yards	167	53
Passing yards	211	292
Passing: Comp–Att–Int	15−30−3	25−33−0
Time of possession	31:40	28:20

Team	Category	Player	Statistics
Columbia	Passing	Cole Freeman	15/30, 211 yards, 2 TDs, 3 INTs
Columbia	Rushing	Malcolm Terry II	12 carries, 59 yards
Columbia	Receiving	Edan Stagg	3 receptions, 62 yards, 1 TD
Georgetown	Passing	Danny Lauter	25/33, 292 yards, 2 TDs
Georgetown	Rushing	Bryce Cox	11 carries, 36 yards, 1 TD
Georgetown	Receiving	Jimmy Kibble	10 receptions, 164 yards

=== Princeton ===
Game Three – Princeton Tigers (1–1) vs Columbia Lions (1–1) – Game summary

Quarter	1	2	3	4	Total
Tigers	0	0	0	0	0
Lions	0	0	0	0	0

at Robert K. Kraft Field at Lawrence A. Wien Stadium, New York, NY

- Date: Saturday October 5, 2024
- Game time: 12:00 PM
- TV announcers (ESPN+): TBD

Game information

First quarter
Second quarter
Third quarter
Fourth quarter

Statistics	PRIN	COLU
First downs		
Total yards		
Rushing yards		
Passing yards		
Passing: Comp–Att–Int		
Time of possession		

Team	Category	Player	Statistics
Princeton	Passing		
Princeton	Rushing		
Princeton	Receiving		
Columbia	Passing		
Columbia	Rushing		
Columbia	Receiving		

=== at Wagner ===
Game Four – Columbia Lions (2–1) vs Wagner Seahawks (3–3) – Game summary

Quarter	1	2	3	4	Total
Lions	0	0	0	0	0
Seahawks	0	0	0	0	0

at Wagner College Stadium, Staten Island, NY

- Date: Saturday October 12, 2024
- Game time: 12:00 PM
- TV: NEC Front Row

Game information

First quarter
Second quarter
Third quarter
Fourth quarter

Statistics	COLU	WAG
First downs		
Total yards		
Rushing yards		
Passing yards		
Passing: Comp–Att–Int		
Time of possession		

Team	Category	Player	Statistics
Columbia	Passing		
Columbia	Rushing		
Columbia	Receiving		
Wagner	Passing		
Wagner	Rushing		
Wagner	Receiving		

=== at Penn ===
Game Five – Columbia Lions (3–1) vs Penn Quakers (2–2) – Game summary

Quarter	1	2	3	4	Total
Lions	0	0	0	0	0
Quakers	0	0	0	0	0

at Franklin Field, Philadelphia, PA

- Date: Saturday October 19, 2024
- Game time: 1:00 PM
- TV: ESPN+

Game information

First quarter
Second quarter
Third quarter
Fourth quarter

Statistics	COLU	PENN
First downs		
Total yards		
Rushing yards		
Passing yards		
Passing: Comp–Att–Int		
Time of possession		

Team	Category	Player	Statistics
Columbia	Passing		
Columbia	Rushing		
Columbia	Receiving		
Penn	Passing		
Penn	Rushing		
Penn	Receiving		

=== No. 22 Dartmouth ===
Game Six – No. 22 Dartmouth Big Green (5–0) vs Columbia Lions (4–1) – Game summary

Quarter	1	2	3	4	Total
No. 22 Big Green	0	0	0	0	0
Lions	0	0	0	0	0

at Wien Stadium • New York, NY

- Date: Saturday October 26, 2024
- Game time: 1:30 p.m.
- Game weather: 0 °F (−18 °C)
- TV: ESPN+

Game information

First quarter
Second quarter
Third quarter
Fourth quarter

Statistics	DART	COLU
First downs		
Total yards		
Rushing yards		
Passing yards		
Passing: Comp–Att–Int		
Time of possession		

Team	Category	Player	Statistics
Dartmouth	Passing		
Dartmouth	Rushing		
Dartmouth	Receiving		
Columbia	Passing		
Columbia	Rushing		
Columbia	Receiving		

=== Yale ===
Game Seven – Yale Bulldogs (4–2) vs Columbia Lions (4–2) – Game summary

Quarter	1	2	3	4	Total
Bulldogs	0	0	0	0	0
Lions	0	0	0	0	0

at Wien Stadium • New York, NY

- Date: Friday November 1, 2024
- Game time: 7:00 p.m.
- Game weather: 0 °F (−18 °C)
- TV announcers (ESPNU): Eric Frede (play-by-play) and Jack Ford (analyst)

Game information

First quarter
Second quarter
Third quarter
Fourth quarter

Statistics	YALE	COLU
First downs		
Total yards		
Rushing yards		
Passing yards		
Passing: Comp–Att–Int		
Time of possession		

Team	Category	Player	Statistics
Yale	Passing		
Yale	Rushing		
Yale	Receiving		
Columbia	Passing		
Columbia	Rushing		
Columbia	Receiving		

=== at No. 24 Harvard ===
Game Eight – Columbia Lions (5–2) at No. 24 Harvard Crimson (6–1) – Game summary

Quarter	1	2	3	4	Total
Lions	0	0	0	0	0
No. 24 Crimson	0	0	0	0	0

at Harvard Stadium, Boston, Massachusetts

- Date: Saturday November 9, 2024
- Game time: 12:00 p.m.
- TV: ESPN+

Game information

First quarter
Second quarter
Third quarter
Fourth quarter

Statistics	COLU	HARV
First downs		
Total yards		
Rushing yards		
Passing yards		
Passing: Comp–Att–Int		
Time of possession		

Team	Category	Player	Statistics
Columbia	Passing		
Columbia	Rushing		
Columbia	Receiving		
Harvard	Passing		
Harvard	Rushing		
Harvard	Receiving		

=== at Brown ===
Game Nine – Columbia Lions (5–3) at Brown Bears (3–5) – Game summary

Quarter	1	2	3	4	Total
Lions	0	7	7	7	21
Bears	0	3	0	9	12

at Brown Stadium, Providence, Rhode Island

- Date: Saturday November 16, 2024
- Game time: 12:00 p.m.
- Game weather: Sunny, 60 °F (16 °C)
- Game attendance: 2,976
- Referee: Bill McKeever
- TV announcers (ESPN+): Scott Cordischi (play-by-play) and John Anderson Jr. (analyst)
- Box score, Recap

Game information
First quarter
- No scoring plays

Second quarter

- COLU – Bryson Canty 55-yard pass from Caleb Sanchez (Hugo Merry kick), 1:13. Lions 7–0. Drive: 3 plays, 73 yards, 0:47.
- BRWN – Christopher Maron 37-yard field goal, 0:00. Lions 7–3. Drive: 2 plays, 10 yards, 0:14.

Third quarter

- COLU – Jordan Kelley 12-yard pass from Caleb Sanchez (Hugo Merry kick), 5:27. Lions 14–3. Drive: 8 plays, 79 yards, 3:32.

Fourth quarter

- COLU – Bryson Canty 52-yard pass from Caleb Sanchez (Hugo Merry kick), 11:52. Lions 21–3. Drive: 3 plays, 53 yards, 1:10.
- BRWN – Christopher Maron 21-yard field goal, 7:11. Lions 21–6. Drive: 13 plays, 72 yards, 4:41.
- BRWN – Ty Pezza 3-yard pass from Jake Wilcox (run failed), 1:37. Lions 21–12. Drive: 13 plays, 80 yards, 3:06.

Statistics	COLU	BRWN
First downs	19	21
Total yards	478	384
Rushing yards	163	94
Passing yards	315	290
Turnovers	1	1
Time of possession	28:32	31:28

Team	Category	Player	Statistics
Columbia	Passing	Caleb Sanchez	12/27, 241 yards, 3 TD
Columbia	Rushing	Joey Giorgi	19 rushes, 107 yards
Columbia	Receiving	Bryson Canty	6 receptions, 183 yards, 2 TD
Brown	Passing	Jake Wilcox	29/40, 242 yards, TD, INT
Brown	Rushing	Jake Wilcox	10 rushes, 47 yards
Brown	Receiving	Mark Mahoney	12 receptions, 120 yards

=== Cornell (rivalry) ===
Game Ten – Cornell Big Red (4–5) vs Columbia Lions (6–3) – Game summary

Quarter	1	2	3	4	Total
Big Red	0	0	0	0	0
Lions	0	0	0	0	0

at Wien Stadium • New York, NY

- Date: Saturday November 23, 2024
- Game time: 12:00 p.m.
- Game weather: 0 °F (−18 °C)
- TV: ESPN+

Game information

First quarter
Second quarter
Third quarter
Fourth quarter

Statistics	COR	COLU
First downs		
Total yards		
Rushing yards		
Passing yards		
Passing: Comp–Att–Int		
Time of possession		

Team	Category	Player	Statistics
Cornell	Passing		
Cornell	Rushing		
Cornell	Receiving		
Columbia	Passing		
Columbia	Rushing		
Columbia	Receiving		
