= 2024 Penn Quakers football team =

American college football season

2024 Penn Quakers football

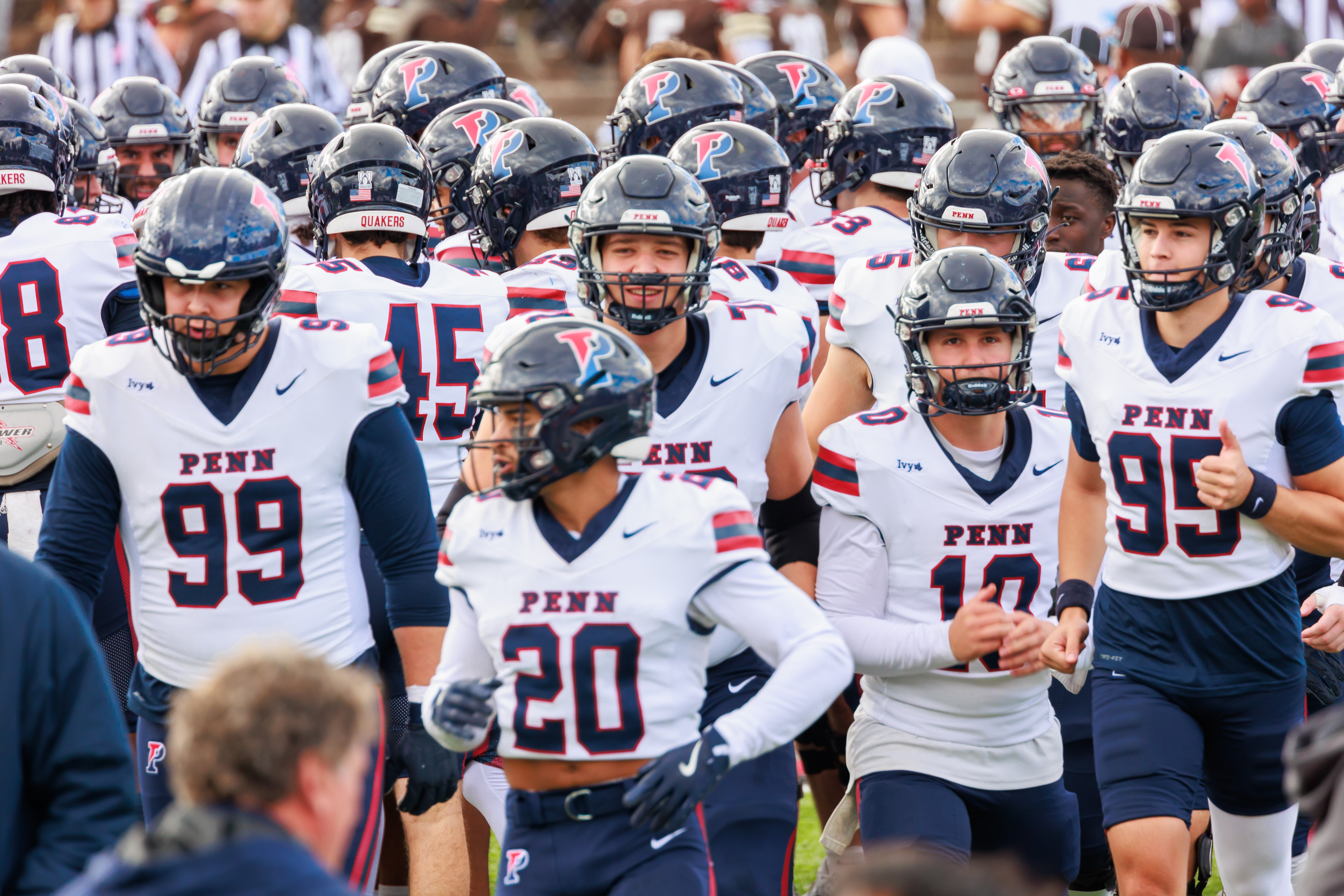
- 2024 Quakers at Brown
- Conference: Ivy League
- Record: 4–6 (2–5 Ivy)
- Head coach: Ray Priore (9th season)
- Offensive coordinator: Greg Chimera (1st season)
- Offensive scheme: Spread option
- Defensive coordinator: Bob Benson (9th season)
- Base defense: 3–3–5
- Home stadium: Franklin Field

2024 Ivy League football standings
	Conf.			Overall
Team	W		L	W		L
Dartmouth +	5	–	2	8	–	2
No. 25 Harvard +	5	–	2	8	–	2
Columbia +	5	–	2	7	–	3
Yale	4	–	3	7	–	3
Cornell	3	–	4	4	–	6
Penn	2	–	5	4	–	6
Brown	2	–	5	3	–	7
Princeton	2	–	5	3	–	7
+ – Conference co-champions; Rankings from STATS Poll

The 2024 Penn Quakers football team represented the University of Pennsylvania as a member of the Ivy League during the 2024 NCAA Division I FCS football season. The team was led by ninth-year head coach Ray Priore and played home games at Franklin Field in Philadelphia.

== Schedule ==
Date	Time	Opponent	Site	TV	Result	Attendance
September 21	6:00 p.m.	at Delaware*	Delaware Stadium; Newark, DE	FloSports	L 22–29	17,848
September 28	1:00 p.m.	Colgate*	Franklin Field; Philadelphia, PA	ESPN+	W 27–17	4,818
October 5	1:00 p.m.	at Dartmouth	Memorial Field; Hanover, NH	ESPN+	L 17–20	4,746
October 12	1:00 p.m.	Bucknell*	Franklin Field; Philadelphia, PA	ESPN+	W 31–21	2,054
October 19	1:00 p.m.	Columbia	Franklin Field; Philadelphia, PA	ESPN+	L 17–23	2,970
October 25	7:00 p.m.	Yale	Franklin Field; Philadelphia, PA	ESPNU	L 10–31	7,917
November 2	12:00 p.m.	at Brown	Richard Gouse Field at Brown Stadium; Providence, RI	ESPN+	W 38–28	5,071
November 9	1:00 p.m.	at Cornell	Schoellkopf Field; Ithaca, NY (rivalry)	ESPN+	W 67–49	2,466
November 16	1:00 p.m.	No. 20 Harvard^{†}	Franklin Field; Philadelphia, PA (rivalry)	ESPN+	L 28–31	12,286
November 23	1:00 p.m.	at Princeton	Powers Field at Princeton Stadium; Princeton, NJ (rivalry)	ESPN+	L 17–20	3,914
*Non-conference game; ^{†}Homecoming; Rankings from STATS Poll released prior to the game; All times are in Eastern time

== Game summaries ==
=== at Delaware ===
Game One – Penn Quakers (0–0) vs Delaware Fightin' Blue Hens (2–0) – Game summary

Quarter	1	2	3	4	Total
Quakers	0	0	0	0	0
Fightin' Blue Hens	0	0	0	0	0

at Delaware Stadium • Newark, DE

- Date: Saturday September 21, 2024
- Game time: 6:00 p.m.
- TV: FloSports

Game information

First quarter
Second quarter
Third quarter
Fourth quarter

Statistics	PENN	DEL
First downs		
Total yards		
Rushing yards		
Passing yards		
Passing: Comp–Att–Int		
Time of possession		

Team	Category	Player	Statistics
Penn	Passing		
Penn	Rushing		
Penn	Receiving		
Delaware	Passing		
Delaware	Rushing		
Delaware	Receiving		

=== Colgate ===
Game Two – Colgate Raiders (1–3) vs Penn Quakers (0–1) – Game summary

Quarter	1	2	3	4	Total
Raiders	0	0	0	0	0
Quakers	0	0	0	0	0

at Franklin Field • Philadelphia, PA

- Date: Saturday September 28, 2024
- Game time: 1:00 p.m.
- Game weather: 0 °F (−18 °C)
- TV: ESPN+

Game information

First quarter
Second quarter
Third quarter
Fourth quarter

Statistics	COLG	PENN
First downs		
Total yards		
Rushing yards		
Passing yards		
Passing: Comp–Att–Int		
Time of possession		

Team	Category	Player	Statistics
Colgate	Passing		
Colgate	Rushing		
Colgate	Receiving		
Penn	Passing		
Penn	Rushing		
Penn	Receiving		

=== at Dartmouth ===
Game Three – Penn Quakers (1–1) vs Dartmouth Big Green (2–0) – Game summary

Quarter	1	2	3	4	Total
Quakers	0	0	0	0	0
Big Green	0	0	0	0	0

at Memorial Field • Hanover, NH

- Date: Saturday October 5, 2024
- Game time: 1:00 p.m.
- TV: ESPN+

Game information

First quarter
Second quarter
Third quarter
Fourth quarter

Statistics	PENN	DART
First downs		
Total yards		
Rushing yards		
Passing yards		
Passing: Comp–Att–Int		
Time of possession		

Team	Category	Player	Statistics
Penn	Passing		
Penn	Rushing		
Penn	Receiving		
Dartmouth	Passing		
Dartmouth	Rushing		
Dartmouth	Receiving		

=== Bucknell ===
Game Four – Bucknell Bison (3–2) at Penn Quakers (1–2) – Game summary

Quarter	1	2	3	4	Total
Bison	0	0	0	0	0
Quakers	0	0	0	0	0

at Franklin Field • Philadelphia, PA

- Date: Saturday October 12, 2024
- Game time: 1:00 p.m. EST
- TV announcers (ESPN+): TBD

Game information

First quarter

Second quarter

Third quarter

Fourth quarter

Statistics	BUCK	PENN
First downs		
Total yards		
Rushing yards		
Passing yards		
Passing: Comp–Att–Int		
Time of possession		

Team	Category	Player	Statistics
Bucknell	Passing		
Bucknell	Rushing		
Bucknell	Receiving		
Penn	Passing		
Penn	Rushing		
Penn	Receiving		

=== Columbia ===
Game Five – Columbia Lions (3–1) vs Penn Quakers (2–2) – Game summary

Quarter	1	2	3	4	Total
Lions	0	0	0	0	0
Quakers	0	0	0	0	0

at Franklin Field, Philadelphia, PA

- Date: Saturday October 19, 2024
- Game time: 1:00 PM
- TV: ESPN+

Game information

First quarter
Second quarter
Third quarter
Fourth quarter

Statistics	COLU	PENN
First downs		
Total yards		
Rushing yards		
Passing yards		
Passing: Comp–Att–Int		
Time of possession		

Team	Category	Player	Statistics
Columbia	Passing		
Columbia	Rushing		
Columbia	Receiving		
Penn	Passing		
Penn	Rushing		
Penn	Receiving		

=== Yale ===
Game Six – Yale Bulldogs (3–2) vs Penn Quakers (2–3) – Game summary

Quarter	1	2	3	4	Total
Bulldogs	0	0	0	0	0
Quakers	0	0	0	0	0

at Franklin Field • Philadelphia, PA

- Date: Friday October 25, 2024
- Game time: 7:00 p.m.
- Game weather: 0 °F (−18 °C)
- TV announcers (ESPNU): Eric Frede (play-by-play) and Jack Ford (analyst)

Game information

First quarter
Second quarter
Third quarter
Fourth quarter

Statistics	YALE	PENN
First downs		
Total yards		
Rushing yards		
Passing yards		
Passing: Comp–Att–Int		
Time of possession		

Team	Category	Player	Statistics
Yale	Passing		
Yale	Rushing		
Yale	Receiving		
Penn	Passing		
Penn	Rushing		
Penn	Receiving		

=== at Brown ===
Game Seven – Penn Quakers (2–4) at Brown Bears (3–3) – Game summary

Quarter	1	2	3	4	Total
Quakers	7	14	10	7	38
Bears	0	7	7	14	28

at Richard Gouse Field at Brown Stadium, Providence, Rhode Island

- Date: Saturday November 2, 2024
- Game time: 12:00 p.m. EDT
- Game weather: Sunny, 58 °F (14 °C)
- Game attendance: 5,071
- Referee: Todd Bowman
- TV announcers (ESPN+): Scott Cordischi (play-by-play) and John Anderson Jr. (analyst)

Game information

First quarter

- PENN – Jared Richardson 10-yard pass from Liam O'Brien (Sam Smith kick), 2:04. Quakers 7–0. Drive: 7 plays, 67 yards, 3:24.

Second quarter

- BRWN – Mark Mahoney 31-yard pass from Jake Wilcox (Christopher Maron kick), 9:22. Tied 7–7. Drive: 11 plays, 69 yards, 4:43.
- PENN – Malachi Hosley 25-yard run (Sam Smith kick), 5:05. Quakers 14–7. Drive: 2 plays, 25 yards, 0:12.
- PENN – Liam O'Brien 10-yard run (Sam Smith kick), 0:26. Quakers 21–7. Drive: 10 plays, 70 yards, 3:03.

Third quarter

- PENN – Malachi Hosley 11-yard run (Sam Smith kick), 13:01. Quakers 28–7. Drive: 5 plays, 72 yards, 1:51.
- BRWN – Qwentin Brown 1-yard run (Christopher Maron kick), 8:50. Quakers 28–14. Drive: 11 plays, 72 yards, 4:04.
- PENN – Sam Smith 30-yard field goal, 3:55. Quakers 31–14. Drive: 10 plays, 65 yards, 4:46.

Fourth quarter

- PENN – Justin Cayenne 15-yard pass from Liam O'Brien (Sam Smith kick), 10:49. Quakers 38–14. Drive: 9 plays, 76 yards, 4:23.
- BRWN – Matt Childs 1-yard run (pass failed), 8:30. Quakers 38–20. Drive: 8 plays, 75 yards, 2:19.
- BRWN – Liam O'Brien sacked in own end zone by John Perdue, 7:37. Quakers 38–22.
- BRWN – Solomon Miller 3-yard pass from Jake Wilcox (pass failed), 3:13. Quakers 38–28. Drive: 14 plays, 75 yards, 4:24.

Statistics	PENN	BRWN
First downs	23	26
Total yards	419	441
Rushing yards	172	148
Passing yards	247	293
Passing: Comp–Att–Int	18–24–0	25–36–0
Time of possession	29:59	30:01

Team	Category	Player	Statistics
Penn	Passing	Liam O'Brien	18/24, 247 yards, 2 TD
Penn	Rushing	Malachi Hosley	17 carries, 102 yards, 2 TD
Penn	Receiving	Jared Richardson	7 receptions, 113 yards, TD
Brown	Passing	Jake Wilcox	24/34, 260 yards, 2 TD
Brown	Rushing	Stockton Owen	11 carries, 58 yards
Brown	Receiving	Mark Mahoney	7 receptions, 85 yards, TD

=== at Cornell (rivalry) ===
Game Eight – Penn Quakers (3–4) at Cornell Big Red (3–4) – Game summary

Quarter	1	2	3	4	Total
Quakers	0	0	0	0	0
Big Red	0	0	0	0	0

at Schoellkopf Field, Ithaca, New York

- Date: Saturday November 9, 2024
- Game time: 1:00 p.m. EDT
- TV: ESPN+

Game information

First quarter
Second quarter
Third quarter
Fourth quarter

Statistics	PENN	COR
First downs		
Total yards		
Rushing yards		
Passing yards		
Passing: Comp–Att–Int		
Time of possession		

Team	Category	Player	Statistics
Penn	Passing		
Penn	Rushing		
Penn	Receiving		
Cornell	Passing		
Cornell	Rushing		
Cornell	Receiving		

=== No. 20 Harvard (rivalry) ===
Game Nine – No. 20 Harvard Crimson (7–1) vs Penn Quakers (4–4) – Game summary

Quarter	1	2	3	4	Total
No. 20 Crimson	0	0	0	0	0
Quakers	0	0	0	0	0

at Franklin Field • Philadelphia, PA

- Date: Saturday November 16, 2024
- Game time: 1:00 p.m.
- Game weather: 0 °F (−18 °C)
- TV announcers (ESPN+): TBD

Game information

First quarter
Second quarter
Third quarter
Fourth quarter

Statistics	HARV	PENN
First downs		
Total yards		
Rushing yards		
Passing yards		
Passing: Comp–Att–Int		
Time of possession		

Team	Category	Player	Statistics
Harvard	Passing		
Harvard	Rushing		
Harvard	Receiving		
Penn	Passing		
Penn	Rushing		
Penn	Receiving		

=== at Princeton (rivalry) ===
Game Ten – Penn Quakers (4–5) at Princeton Tigers (2–7) – Game summary

Quarter	1	2	3	4	Total
Quakers	0	0	0	0	0
Tigers	0	0	0	0	0

at Princeton Stadium, Princeton, New Jersey

- Date: Saturday November 23, 2024
- Game time: 1:00 p.m. EDT
- TV: ESPN+

Game information

First quarter
Second quarter
Third quarter
Fourth quarter

Statistics	PENN	PRIN
First downs		
Total yards		
Rushing yards		
Passing yards		
Passing: Comp–Att–Int		
Time of possession		

Team	Category	Player	Statistics
Penn	Passing		
Penn	Rushing		
Penn	Receiving		
Princeton	Passing		
Princeton	Rushing		
Princeton	Receiving		
