= 2025 Princeton Tigers football team =

American college football season

2025 Princeton Tigers football
- Conference: Ivy League
- Record: 3–7 (2–5 Ivy)
- Head coach: Bob Surace (15th season)
- Offensive coordinator: Mike Rosenbaum (2nd season)
- Offensive scheme: Spread option
- Defensive coordinator: Steve Verbit (12th season)
- Base defense: 4–2–5
- Home stadium: Powers Field at Princeton Stadium

2025 Ivy League football standings
| | Conf. | | | Overall |
| Team | W | | L | W | | L |
|---|---|---|---|---|---|---|
| No. 15 Yale +^ | 6 | – | 1 | 9 | – | 3 |
| No. 20 Harvard +^ | 6 | – | 1 | 9 | – | 2 |
| Dartmouth | 4 | – | 3 | 7 | – | 3 |
| Penn | 4 | – | 3 | 6 | – | 4 |
| Cornell | 3 | – | 4 | 4 | – | 6 |
| Princeton | 2 | – | 5 | 3 | – | 7 |
| Brown | 2 | – | 5 | 5 | – | 5 |
| Columbia | 1 | – | 6 | 2 | – | 8 |
+ – Conference co-champions; ^ – FCS playoff participant; Rankings from STATS Poll

The 2025 Princeton Tigers football team represented Princeton University as a member of the Ivy League during the 2025 NCAA Division I FCS football season. The team was led by 15th-year head coach Bob Surace and played its home games at Powers Field at Princeton Stadium.

== Preseason ==
=== Preseason poll ===
On August 4, Ivy League announced the preseason poll. Tigers were selected to finish in the fifth position.

== Schedule ==
| Date | Time | Opponent | Site | TV | Result | Attendance |
|---|---|---|---|---|---|---|
| September 20 | 12:00 p.m. | San Diego* | Powers Field at Princeton Stadium; Princeton, NJ | ESPN+ | L 35–42 | 3,656 |
| September 27 | 3:30 p.m. | at Lafayette* | Fisher Stadium; Easton, PA | ESPN+ | W 38–28 | 7,127 |
| October 3 | 7:30 p.m. | Columbia | Powers Field at Princeton Stadium; Princeton, NJ | ESPNU | W 17–10 | 4,286 |
| October 11 | 1:00 p.m. | No. 25 Mercer* | Powers Field at Princeton Stadium; Princeton, NJ | ESPN+ | L 14–38 | 2,970 |
| October 18 | 12:00 p.m. | at Brown | Brown Stadium; Providence, RI | ESPN+ | W 40–21 | 4,304 |
| October 25 | 12:00 p.m. | No. 14 Harvard^{†} | Powers Field at Princeton Stadium; Princeton, NJ (rivalry) | ESPN+ | L 14–35 | 9,137 |
| November 1 | 1:00 p.m. | at Cornell | Schoellkopf Field; Ithaca, NY | ESPN+ | L 17–20 | 4,273 |
| November 8 | 1:00 p.m. | at Dartmouth | Memorial Field; Hanover, NH | ESPN+ | L 17–20 | 3,392 |
| November 15 | 12:00 p.m. | Yale | Powers Field at Princeton Stadium; Princeton, NJ (rivalry) | ESPN+ | L 10–13 | 4,704 |
| November 22 | 1:00 p.m. | at Penn | Franklin Field; Philadelphia, PA (rivalry) | ESPN+ | L 6–17 | 3,093 |
*Non-conference game; ^{†}Homecoming; Rankings from STATS Poll released prior to the game; All times are in Eastern time

== Game summaries ==
=== San Diego ===
San Diego Toreros (1–2) at Princeton Tigers (0–0) – Game summary

| Quarter | 1 | 2 | 3 | 4 | Total |
|---|---|---|---|---|---|
| Toreros | 0 | 21 | 0 | 21 | 42 |
| Tigers | 21 | 14 | 0 | 0 | 35 |

at Princeton Stadium, Princeton, New Jersey

- Date: September 20
- Game time: 12:00 p.m. EDT
- Game weather: Sunny • Wind: NE at 10 miles per hour (16 km/h)
- Game attendance: 3,656
- Referee: Marc Queen
- TV: ESPN+

Game information

First quarter

- (11:08) PRIN – Asher Weiner 1-yard run, Esteban Nunez Perez kick (Drive: 10 plays, 75 yards, 3:52; Princeton 7-0)
- (8:57) PRIN – Dareion Murphy 1-yard run, Esteban Nunez Perez kick (Drive: 3 plays, 32 yards, 1:04; Princeton 14-0)
- (6:15) PRIN – Ethan Clark 55-yard run, Esteban Nunez Perez kick (Drive: 2 plays, 63 yards, 0:44; Princeton 21-0)

Second quarter

- (12:56) USD – Josh Heverly 4-yard pass from Tyler Voss, Emiliano Salazar kick (Drive: 5 plays, 29 yards, 2:23; Princeton 21-7)
- (11:15) PRIN – Ethan Clark 25-yard pass from Kai Colón, Esteban Nunez Perez kick (Drive: 5 plays, 75 yards, 1:41; Princeton 28-7)
- (7:11) USD – Chrostopher Hall 37-yard pass from Tyler Voss, Emiliano Salazar kick (Drive: 8 plays, 70 yards, 3:58; Princeton 28-14)
- (5:19) PRIN – Dareion Murphy 18-yard run, Esteban Nunez Perez kick (Drive: 5 plays, 75 yards, 1:52; Princeton 35-14)
- (0:15) USD – Josh Heverly 17-yard pass from Tyler Voss, Emiliano Salazar kick (Drive: 11 plays, 80 yards, 1:25; Princeton 35-21)

Third quarter

No scoring plays

Fourth quarter

- (9:50) USD – Adam Criter 4-yard run, Emiliano Salazar kick (Drive: 14 plays, 67 yards, 6:28; Princeton 35-28)
- (8:09) USD – Adam Criter 24-yard run, Emiliano Salazar kick (Drive: 3 plays, 32 yards, 1:29; 35-35)
- (1:04) USD – Adam Criter 8-yard run, Emiliano Salazar kick (Drive: 11 plays, 81 yards, 5:57; San Diego 42-35)

| Statistics | USD | PRIN |
|---|---|---|
| First downs | 25 | 16 |
| Total yards | 485 | 399 |
| Rushing yards | 133 | 116 |
| Passing yards | 352 | 283 |
| Turnovers | 1 | 1 |
| Time of possession | 38:22 | 21:38 |

| Team | Category | Player | Statistics |
|---|---|---|---|
| San Diego | Passing | Tyler Voss | 25/34, 237 yards, 3 TD |
| San Diego | Rushing | Adam Criter | 25 rushes, 105 yards, 3 TD |
| San Diego | Receiving | Cole Monach | 7 receptions, 91 yards |
| Princeton | Passing | Kai Colón | 12/18, 196 yards, TD |
| Princeton | Rushing | Ethan Clark | 7 rushes, 72 yards, TD |
| Princeton | Receiving | Charley Rossi | 2 receptions, 79 yards |

=== at Lafayette ===
Princeton Tigers (0–1) at Lafayette Leopards (3–1) – Game summary

| Quarter | 1 | 2 | 3 | 4 | Total |
|---|---|---|---|---|---|
| Tigers | 7 | 21 | 3 | 7 | 38 |
| Leopards | 0 | 14 | 0 | 14 | 28 |

at Fisher Stadium, Easton, Pennsylvania

- Date: September 27
- Game time: 3:30 PM EDT
- Referee: Antonio Marcella
- TV announcers (ESPN+): Gary Laubach (play-by-play), Mike Joseph (analyst) and Megan Caffrey (sideline)

Game information

First quarter

- (4:51) PRIN – Ethan Clark 1-yard run, Esteban Nunez Perez kick (Drive: 13 plays, 80 yards, 6:33; Princeton 7-0)

Second quarter

- (14:40) LAF – Ethan Weber 9-yard run, Jack Simonetta kick (Drive: 11 plays, 67 yards, 5:11; 7-7)
- (9:16) PRIN – Dareion Murphy 4-yard run, Esteban Nunez Perez kick (Drive: 11 plays, 59 yards, 5:24; Princeton 14-7)
- (7:17) PRIN – Blaine Hipa 4-yard run, Esteban Nunez Perez kick (Drive: 3 plays, 32 yards, 1:44; Princeton 21-7)
- (2:08) PRIN – Torian Roberts 0-yard interception return, Esteban Nunez Perez kick (Drive: 5 plays, 21 yards, 2:17; Princeton 28-7)
- (0:12) LAF – Ethan Weber 1-yard run, Jack Simonetta kick (Drive: 10 plays, 80 yards, 1:56; Princeton 28-14)

Third quarter

- (3:40) PRIN – Will Cluskey 26-yard field goal (Drive: 19 plays, 81 yards, 8:56; Princeton 31-14)

Fourth quarter

- (12:27) LAF – Jakyre Henley 3-yard run, Jack Simonetta kick (Drive: 12 plays, 87 yards, 3:50; Princeton 31-21)
- (3:37) PRIN – Jackson Green 4-yard pass from Kai Colón, Esteban Nunez Perez kick (Drive: 14 plays, 54 yards, 7:13; Princeton 38-21)
- (0:37) LAF – Hunter Ditrano 2-yard pass from Dean DeNobile, Jack Simonetta kick (Drive: 13 plays, 65 yards, 3:00; Princeton 38-28)

| Statistics | PRIN | LAF |
|---|---|---|
| First downs | 25 | 20 |
| Total yards | 344 | 396 |
| Rushing yards | 125 | 126 |
| Passing yards | 219 | 270 |
| Turnovers | 0 | 3 |
| Time of possession | 35:48 | 24:12 |

| Team | Category | Player | Statistics |
|---|---|---|---|
| Princeton | Passing | Kai Colón | 13/20, 121 yards, TD |
| Princeton | Rushing | Kai Honda | 6 rushes, 37 yards |
| Princeton | Receiving | Jackson Green | 5 receptions, 64 yards, TD |
| Lafayette | Passing | Dean DeNobile | 27/36, 256 yards, TD, INT |
| Lafayette | Rushing | Ethan Weber | 18 rushes, 76 yards, 2 TD |
| Lafayette | Receiving | Elijah Steward | 7 receptions, 81 yards |

=== Columbia ===
Columbia Lions (1–1) at Princeton Tigers (1–1) – Game summary

| Quarter | 1 | 2 | 3 | 4 | Total |
|---|---|---|---|---|---|
| Lions | 10 | 0 | 0 | 0 | 10 |
| Tigers | 0 | 7 | 0 | 10 | 17 |

at Princeton Stadium, Princeton, New Jersey

- Date: October 3
- Game time: 7:30 PM EDT
- Game attendance: 4,286
- Referee: Bill McKeever
- TV announcers (ESPNU): Eric Frede (play-by-play) and Jack Ford (analyst)

Game information

First quarter

- (7:51) COLU – Hugo Merry 29-yard field goal (Drive: 11 plays, 58 yards, 5:49; Columbia 3-0)
- (0:14) COLU – Lucas Bullock 2-yard run, Hugo Merry kick (Drive: 10 plays, 89 yards, 5:07; Columbia 10-0)

Second quarter

- (0:49) PRIN – Asher Weiner 1-yard run, Esteban Nunez Perez kick (Drive: 2 plays, 1 yard, 0:43; Columbia 10-7)

Third quarter

No scoring plays

Fourth quarter

- (13:27) PRIN – Ethan Clark 2-yard run, Esteban Nunez Perez kick (Drive: 8 plays, 71 yards, 3:36; Princeton 14-10)
- (9:21) PRIN – Esteban Nunez Perez 38-yard field goal (Drive: 7 plays, 49 yards, 2:40; Princeton 17-10)

| Statistics | COLU | PRIN |
|---|---|---|
| First downs | 18 | 17 |
| Total yards | 315 | 352 |
| Rushing yards | 110 | 114 |
| Passing yards | 205 | 238 |
| Turnovers | 2 | 2 |
| Time of possession | 31:31 | 28:29 |

| Team | Category | Player | Statistics |
|---|---|---|---|
| Columbia | Passing | Chase Goodwin | 19/28, 165 yards, 2 INT |
| Columbia | Rushing | Griffin Johnson | 10 rushes, 46 yards |
| Columbia | Receiving | Titus Evans | 8 receptions, 93 yards |
| Princeton | Passing | Kai Colón | 7/17, 145 yards, INT |
| Princeton | Rushing | Blaine Hipa | 8 rushes, 38 yards |
| Princeton | Receiving | Josh Robinson | 4 receptions, 73 yards |

=== No. 25 Mercer ===
No. 25 Mercer Bears (4–1) at Princeton Tigers (2–1) – Game summary

| Quarter | 1 | 2 | 3 | 4 | Total |
|---|---|---|---|---|---|
| No. 25 Bears | 14 | 7 | 14 | 3 | 38 |
| Tigers | 0 | 7 | 0 | 7 | 14 |

at Princeton Stadium, Princeton, New Jersey

- Date: October 11
- Game time: 1:00 PM EDT
- Game weather: Sunny • Wind: SW at 5 miles per hour (8.0 km/h)
- Game attendance: 2,970
- Referee: Henry Wimberg
- TV announcers (ESPN+): Cody Chrusciel (play-by-play), Dave Giancola (analyst) and Steven Cusumano (sideline)

Game information
First quarter
- (9:31) MER – Malik Simmons 2-yard pass from Braden Atkinson, Reice Griffith kick (Drive: 13 plays, 72 yards, 5:29; Mercer 7–0)
- (1:11) MER – CJ Miller 5-yard run, Reice Griffith kick (Drive: 9 plays, 47 yards, 4:20; Mercer 14–0)

Second quarter

- (7:49) MER – Samuel Albee 23-yard pass from Braden Atkinson, Reice Griffith kick (Drive: 3 plays, 84 yards, 0:58; Mercer 21–0)
- (0:33) PRIN – Aidan Besselman 2-yard pass from Kai Colón, Esteban Nunez Perez kick (Drive: 6 plays, 43 yards, 2:56; Mercer 21–7)

Third quarter

- (10:33) MER – Brayden Smith 10-yard pass from Braden Atkinson, Reice Griffith kick (Drive: 7 plays, 46 yards, 2:56; Mercer 28–7)
- (4:39) MER – Adjatay Dabbs 10-yard run, Reice Griffith kick (Drive: 7 plays, 81 yards, 3:48; Mercer 35–7)

Fourth quarter

- (14:04) MER – Reice Griffith 30-yard field goal (Drive: 7 plays, 52 yards, 1:23; Mercer 38–7)
- (8:54) PRIN – Jackson Green 11-yard pass from Kai Colón, Esteban Nunez Perez kick (Drive: 11 plays, 75 yards, 5:10; Mercer 38–14)

| Statistics | MER | PRIN |
|---|---|---|
| First downs | 28 | 18 |
| Total yards | 503 | 257 |
| Rushing yards | 156 | 66 |
| Passing yards | 347 | 191 |
| Turnovers | 1 | 2 |
| Time of possession | 31:43 | 28:17 |

| Team | Category | Player | Statistics |
|---|---|---|---|
| Mercer | Passing | Braden Atkinson | 27/42, 347 yards, 3 TD, INT |
| Mercer | Rushing | Tyrell Coard | 7 rushes, 54 yards |
| Mercer | Receiving | Adjatay Dabbs | 3 receptions, 78 yards |
| Princeton | Passing | Kai Colón | 13/21, 124 yards, 2 TD |
| Princeton | Rushing | Kai Honda | 8 rushes, 39 yards |
| Princeton | Receiving | Josh Robinson | 6 receptions, 60 yards |

=== at Brown ===
Princeton Tigers (2–2) at Brown Bears (3–1) – Game summary

| Quarter | 1 | 2 | 3 | 4 | Total |
|---|---|---|---|---|---|
| Tigers | 10 | 10 | 13 | 7 | 40 |
| Bears | 7 | 7 | 0 | 7 | 21 |

at Brown Stadium, Providence, RI

- Date: October 18
- Game time: 12:00 p.m. EDT
- Game weather: Sunny, 62 °F (17 °C)
- Game attendance: 4,304
- Referee: Tom Zetts
- TV announcers (ESPN+): Scott Cordischi (play-by-play), John Anderson (analyst) and Nick Coit (sideline)

Game information
First quarter
- (9:53) PRIN – Jackson Green 3-yard pass from Kai Colón, Esteban Nunez Perez kick (Drive: 15 plays, 85 yards, 5:03; Princeton 7–0)
- (7:00) BRWN – Matt Childs 27-yard run, Drew Crabtree kick (Drive: 1 play, 27 yards, 0:07; Tied 7–7)
- (2:48) PRIN – Esteban Nunez Perez 37-yard field goal (Drive: 4 plays, 1 yard, 1:21; Princeton 10–7)

Second quarter

- (11:27) BRWN – Qwentin Brown 1-yard run, Drew Crabtree kick (Drive: 14 plays, 75 yards, 6:21; Brown 14–10)
- (6:31) PRIN – Josh Robinson 20-yard pass from Kai Colón, Esteban Nunez Perez kick (Drive: 5 plays, 37 yards, 1:36; Princeton 17–14)
- (0:15) PRIN – Esteban Nunez Perez 29-yard field goal (Drive: 7 plays, 46 yards, 2:15; Princeton 20–14)

Third quarter

- (7:30) PRIN – Asher Weiner 1-yard run (Drive: 8 plays, 44 yards, 3:39; Princeton 26–14)
- (1:23) PRIN – Ethan Clark 12-yard run, Esteban Nunez Perez kick (Drive: 8 plays, 86 yards, 3:54; Princeton 33–14)

Fourth quarter

- (13:11) BRWN – Matt Childs 1-yard run, Drew Crabtree kick (Drive: 10 plays, 80 yards, 3:06; Princeton 33–21)
- (9:14) PRIN – Kai Honda 2-yard run, Esteban Nunez Perez kick (Drive: 2 plays, 21 yards, 0:46; Princeton 40–21)

| Statistics | PRIN | BRWN |
|---|---|---|
| First downs | 22 | 24 |
| Total yards | 412 | 370 |
| Rushing yards | 195 | 163 |
| Passing yards | 217 | 207 |
| Turnovers | 2 | 4 |
| Time of possession | 29:35 | 30:25 |

| Team | Category | Player | Statistics |
|---|---|---|---|
| Princeton | Passing | Kai Colón | 19/29, 212 yards, 2 TD, INT |
| Princeton | Rushing | Ethan Clark | 17 carries, 120 yards, TD |
| Princeton | Receiving | Josh Robinson | 8 receptions, 91 yards, TD |
| Brown | Passing | James Murphy | 22/35, 173 yards, 3 INT |
| Brown | Rushing | Matt Childs | 14 carries, 94 yards, 2 TD |
| Brown | Receiving | Michael Nesbit | 3 receptions, 31 yards |

=== No. 14 Harvard (rivalry) ===
No. 14 Harvard Crimson (5–0) at Princeton Tigers (3–2) – Game summary

| Quarter | 1 | 2 | 3 | 4 | Total |
|---|---|---|---|---|---|
| No. 14 Crimson | 7 | 14 | 0 | 14 | 35 |
| Tigers | 7 | 7 | 0 | 0 | 14 |

at Princeton Stadium, Princeton, NJ

- Date: October 25
- Game time: 12:00 p.m. EDT
- Game weather: Sunny
- Game attendance: 9,137
- Referee: Jeremy DeAngulo
- TV announcers (ESPN+): Cody Chrusciel (play-by-play) and Dave Giancola (analyst)

Game information

First quarter

- (10:37) HARV – Cam Henry 69-yard pass from Jaden Craig, Kieran Corr kick (Drive: 2 plays, 88 yards, 0:45; Harvard 7-0)
- (1:27) PRIN – Aidan Besselman 17-yard pass from Kai Colón, Esteban Nunez Perez kick (Drive: 12 plays, 97 yards, 4:14; 7-7)

Second quarter

- (12:02) HARV – Kieran Corr 22-yard field goal (Drive: 10 plays, 71 yards, 4:20; Harvard 10-7)
- (3:50) PRIN – Ethan Clark 51-yard pass from Kai Colón, Esteban Nunez Perez kick (Drive: 2 plays, 54 yards, 0:44; Princeton 14-10)
- (1:05) HARV – Kieran Corr 25-yard field goal (Drive: 10 plays, 68 yards, 2:45; Princeton 14-13)
- (0:18) HARV – Xaviah Bascon 4-yard run, Jaden Craig pass to Jordan Harris for two-point conversion (Drive: 4 plays, 28 yards, 0:26; Harvard 21-14)

Third quarter

No scoring plays

Fourth quarter

- (14:58) HARV – Isaiah Bullock 1-yard run, Kieran Corr kick (Drive: 17 plays, 71 yards, 9:02; Harvard 28-14)
- (9:04) HARV – DJ Gordon 9-yard run, Kieran Corr kick (Drive: 8 plays, 62 yards, 4:32; Harvard 35-14)

| Statistics | HARV | PRIN |
|---|---|---|
| First downs | 24 | 18 |
| Total yards | 475 | 340 |
| Rushing yards | 259 | 98 |
| Passing yards | 216 | 242 |
| Turnovers | 1 | 1 |
| Time of possession | 32:14 | 27:46 |

| Team | Category | Player | Statistics |
|---|---|---|---|
| Harvard | Passing | Jaden Craig | 16/29, 216 yards, TD, INT |
| Harvard | Rushing | Xaviah Bascon | 13 carries, 101 yards, TD |
| Harvard | Receiving | Cam Henry | 4 receptions, 79 yards, TD |
| Princeton | Passing | Kai Colón | 19/31, 239 yards, 2 TD, INT |
| Princeton | Rushing | Ethan Clark | 14 carries, 61 yards |
| Princeton | Receiving | Paul Kuhner | 2 receptions, 65 yards |

=== at Cornell ===
Princeton Tigers (3–3) at Cornell Big Red (2–4) – Game summary

| Quarter | 1 | 2 | 3 | 4 | Total |
|---|---|---|---|---|---|
| Tigers | 14 | 3 | 0 | 0 | 17 |
| Big Red | 0 | 7 | 6 | 7 | 20 |

at Schoellkopf Field, Ithaca, NY

- Date: November 1
- Game time: 1:00 p.m. EDT
- Game weather: Cloudy • Temperature: 47 °F (8 °C) • Wind: E at 9 miles per hour (14 km/h)
- Game attendance: 4,273
- Referee: Eric Lewis
- TV announcers (ESPN+): Nick DeLuca (play-by-play) and Matt Miller (analyst)

Game information

First quarter

- (11:11) PRIN – Josh Robinson 27-yard pass from Kai Colón, Esteban Nunez Perez kick (Drive: 9 plays, 75 yards, 3:49; Princeton 7-0)
- (4:13) PRIN – Ethan Clark 4-yard run, Esteban Nunez Perez kick (Drive: 7 plays, 33 yards, 2:40; Princeton 14-0)

Second quarter

- (14:58) COR – Garrett Bass-Sulpizio 1-yard run, Caden Lesiewicz kick (Drive: 10 plays, 57 yards, 4:09; Princeton 14-7)
- (5:31) PRIN – Esteban Nunez Perez 21-yard field goal (Drive: 9 plays, 43 yards, 3:09; Princeton 17-7)

Third quarter

- (10:43) COR – Doryn Smith 5-yard pass from Garrett Bass-Sulpizio, Caden Lesiewicz PAT blocked (Drive: 10 plays, 75 yards, 4:17; Princeton 17-13)

Fourth quarter

- (11:15) COR – Ryder Kurtz 14-yard pass from Garrett Bass-Sulpizio, Caden Lesiewicz kick (Drive: 7 plays, 33 yards, 2:14; Cornell 20-17)

| Statistics | PRIN | COR |
|---|---|---|
| First downs | 19 | 18 |
| Total yards | 342 | 330 |
| Rushing yards | 123 | 213 |
| Passing yards | 219 | 117 |
| Turnovers | 2 | 2 |
| Time of possession | 29:32 | 30:28 |

| Team | Category | Player | Statistics |
|---|---|---|---|
| Princeton | Passing | Kai Colón | 16/32, 219 yards, TD |
| Princeton | Rushing | Ethan Clark | 19 carries, 89 yards, TD |
| Princeton | Receiving | Roman Laurio | 4 receptions, 97 yards |
| Cornell | Passing | Garrett Bass-Sulpizio | 15/25, 117 yards, 2 TD, INT |
| Cornell | Rushing | Jordan Triplett | 16 carries, 72 yards |
| Cornell | Receiving | Doryn Smith | 5 receptions, 39 yards, TD |

=== at Dartmouth ===
Princeton Tigers (3–4) at Dartmouth Big Green (5–2) – Game summary

| Quarter | 1 | 2 | 3 | 4 | Total |
|---|---|---|---|---|---|
| Tigers | 0 | 3 | 0 | 14 | 17 |
| Big Green | 7 | 7 | 6 | 0 | 20 |

at Memorial Field, Hanover, NH

- Date: November 8
- Game time: 1:00 p.m. EDT
- Game weather: Sunny • Temperature: 58 °F (14 °C) • Wind: NW at 6 miles per hour (9.7 km/h)
- Game attendance: 3,392
- Referee: Jeff Pumphrey
- TV announcers (ESPN+): Matt Corsetti (play-by-play) and Chris Jared (analyst)

Game information

First quarter

- (10:35) DART – Grayson Saunier 1-yard run, Owen Zalc kick (Drive: 5 plays, 35 yards, 2:36; Dartmouth 7-0)

Second quarter

- (14:56) DART – DJ Crowther 3-yard run, Owen Zalc kick (Drive: 15 plays, 88 yards, 7:54; Dartmouth 14-0)
- (1:12) PRIN – Esteban Nunez Perez 36-yard field goal (Drive: 6 plays, 37 yards, 1:05; Dartmouth 14-3)

Third quarter

- (11:01) DART – Chris Corbo 25-yard pass from Grayson Saunier, two-point pass conversion failed (Drive: 7 plays, 75 yards, 3:59; Dartmouth 20-3)

Fourth quarter

- (12:31) PRIN – Christian Lynch 2-yard run, two-point pass conversion failed (Drive: 8 plays, 52 yards, 3:40; Dartmouth 20-9)
- (0:33) PRIN – Kai Colón 5-yard run, Kai Colón run for two-point conversion (Drive: 11 plays, 80 yards, 2:41; Dartmouth 20-17)

| Statistics | PRIN | DART |
|---|---|---|
| First downs | 26 | 13 |
| Total yards | 408 | 289 |
| Rushing yards | 142 | 137 |
| Passing yards | 266 | 152 |
| Turnovers | 2 | 0 |
| Time of possession | 33:33 | 26:27 |

| Team | Category | Player | Statistics |
|---|---|---|---|
| Princeton | Passing | Kai Colón | 29/46, 266 yards, 2 INT |
| Princeton | Rushing | Ethan Clark | 12 carries, 69 yards |
| Princeton | Receiving | Josh Robinson | 8 receptions, 70 yards |
| Dartmouth | Passing | Grayson Saunier | 12/15, 152 yards, TD |
| Dartmouth | Rushing | DJ Crowther | 20 carries, 96 yards, TD |
| Dartmouth | Receiving | Chris Corbo | 4 receptions, 66 yards, TD |

=== Yale (rivalry) ===
Yale Bulldogs (6–2) at Princeton Tigers (3–5) – Game summary

| Quarter | 1 | 2 | 3 | 4 | Total |
|---|---|---|---|---|---|
| Bulldogs | 0 | 10 | 0 | 3 | 13 |
| Tigers | 3 | 0 | 0 | 7 | 10 |

at Princeton Stadium, Princeton, NJ

- Date: November 15
- Game time: 12:00 p.m. EDT
- Game weather: Sunny • Temperature: 48 °F (9 °C) • Wind: S at 2 miles per hour (3.2 km/h)
- Game attendance: 4,704
- Referee: Bill McKeever
- TV: ESPN+

Game information

First quarter

- (0:33) PRIN – Esteban Nunez Perez 29-yard field goal (Drive: 11 plays, 68 yards, 5:29; Princeton 3-0)

Second quarter

- (6:53) YALE – Noah Piper 37-yard field goal (Drive: 10 plays, 52 yards, 4:28; 3-3)
- (3:48) YALE – Josh Pitsenberger 1-yard run, Noah Piper kick (Drive: 4 plays, 65 yards, 1:37; Yale 10-3)

Third quarter

No scoring plays

Fourth quarter

- (8:46) PRIN – Ethan Clark 1-yard run, Esteban Nunez Perez kick (Drive: 7 plays, 63 yards, 3:53; 10-10)
- (3:50) YALE – Noah Piper 37-yard field goal (Drive: 12 plays, 55 yards, 4:56; Yale 13-10)

| Statistics | YALE | PRIN |
|---|---|---|
| First downs | 12 | 18 |
| Total yards | 273 | 313 |
| Rushing yards | 119 | 136 |
| Passing yards | 154 | 177 |
| Turnovers | 2 | 2 |
| Time of possession | 25:36 | 34:24 |

| Team | Category | Player | Statistics |
|---|---|---|---|
| Yale | Passing | Dante Reno | 11/16, 154 yards, 2 INT |
| Yale | Rushing | Josh Pitsenberger | 24 carries, 106 yards, TD |
| Yale | Receiving | Nico Brown | 5 receptions, 102 yards |
| Princeton | Passing | Kai Colón | 11/23, 177 yards, INT |
| Princeton | Rushing | Ethan Clark | 24 carries, 90 yards, TD |
| Princeton | Receiving | Josh Robinson | 7 receptions, 113 yards |

=== at Penn (rivalry) ===
Princeton Tigers at Penn Quakers – Game summary

| Quarter | 1 | 2 | 3 | 4 | Total |
|---|---|---|---|---|---|
| Tigers | 3 | 3 | 0 | 0 | 6 |
| Quakers | 0 | 7 | 7 | 3 | 17 |

at Franklin Field, Philadelphia, PA

- Date: November 22
- Game time: 1:00 p.m. EDT
- Game weather: Sunny
- Game attendance: 3,093
- Referee: Cory Hanson
- TV: ESPN+

Game information

First quarter

- (9:28) PRIN – Esteban Nunez Perez 32-yard field goal (Drive: 11 plays, 60 yards, 5:32; Princeton 3-0)

Second quarter

- (14:32) PENN – Davis Ellis 2-yard pass from Liam O'Brien, Mason Walters kick (Drive: 19 plays, 75 yards, 9:56; Penn 7-3)
- (1:51) PRIN – Esteban Nunez Perez 30-yard field goal (Drive: 13 plays, 43 yards, 5:22; Penn 7-6)

Third quarter

- (12:01) PENN – Bisi Owens 39-yard pass from Liam O'Brien, Mason Walters kick (Drive: 7 plays, 75 yards, 2:59; Penn 14-6)

Fourth quarter

- (10:22) PENN – Mason Walters 22-yard field goal (Drive: 8 plays, 75 yards, 3:26; Penn 17-6)

| Statistics | PRIN | PENN |
|---|---|---|
| First downs | 14 | 19 |
| Total yards | 227 | 323 |
| Rushing yards | 83 | 80 |
| Passing yards | 144 | 243 |
| Turnovers | 1 | 0 |
| Time of possession | 28:28 | 31:32 |

| Team | Category | Player | Statistics |
|---|---|---|---|
| Princeton | Passing | Blaine Hipa | 11/24, 120 yards, INT |
| Princeton | Rushing | Ethan Clark | 14 carries, 36 yards |
| Princeton | Receiving | Josh Robinson | 5 receptions, 68 yards |
| Penn | Passing | Liam O'Brien | 22/31, 243 yards, 2 TD |
| Penn | Rushing | Donte West | 12 carries, 37 yards |
| Penn | Receiving | Jared Richardson | 12 receptions, 95 yards |
