= 2025 Dartmouth Big Green football team =

American college football season

2025 Dartmouth Big Green football
- Conference: Ivy League
- Record: 7–3 (4–3 Ivy)
- Head coach: Sammy McCorkle (3rd season)
- Offensive coordinator: Shane Montgomery (1st season)
- Offensive scheme: Pro spread
- Defensive coordinator: Don Dobes (15th season)
- Base defense: 3–3–5
- Home stadium: Memorial Field

2025 Ivy League football standings
	Conf.			Overall
Team	W		L	W		L
No. 15 Yale +^	6	–	1	9	–	3
No. 20 Harvard +^	6	–	1	9	–	2
Dartmouth	4	–	3	7	–	3
Penn	4	–	3	6	–	4
Cornell	3	–	4	4	–	6
Princeton	2	–	5	3	–	7
Brown	2	–	5	5	–	5
Columbia	1	–	6	2	–	8
+ – Conference co-champions; ^ – FCS playoff participant; Rankings from STATS Poll

The 2025 Dartmouth Big Green football team represented Dartmouth College as a member of the Ivy League during the 2025 NCAA Division I FCS football season. The Big Green were led by third-year head coach Sammy McCorkle and played home games at Memorial Field.

== Preseason ==
=== Preseason poll ===
On August 4, 2025, the Ivy League announced the preseason poll. The Big Green were selected to finish in second place, behind Harvard.

=== Transfers ===
==== Outgoing ====
Player	Position	Destination
Nick Marinaro	IOL	Ohio
Josiah Green	DL	Duke
Alex Geraci	TE	UMass
Jordan Washington	CB	Stanford
Painter Richards-Baker	WR	Western Carolina
Micah Green	LB	Unknown
Zach Farris	CB	UMass
Q Jones	RB	Unknown

== Schedule ==
Date	Time	Opponent	Site	TV	Result	Attendance
September 20	1:00 p.m.	No. 25 New Hampshire*	Memorial Field; Hanover, NH (rivalry)	ESPN+	W 27–20	4,457
September 27	12:00 p.m.	at Central Connecticut*	Arute Field; New Britain, CT	NEC Front Row	W 35–28	4,019
October 4	1:00 p.m.	at Penn	Franklin Field; Philadelphia, PA	ESPN+	L 24–36	6,541
October 11	1:30 p.m.	Yale^{†}	Memorial Field; Hanover, NH	ESPN+	W 17–16	7,895
October 18	1:00 p.m.	at Fordham*	Coffey Field; The Bronx, NY	ESPN+	W 30–13	3,814
October 24	6:00 p.m.	Columbia	Memorial Field; Hanover, NH	ESPNU	W 49–3	3,471
November 1	3:00 p.m.	at No. 12 Harvard	Harvard Stadium; Boston, MA (rivalry)	ESPN+	L 10–31	11,334
November 8	1:00 p.m.	Princeton	Memorial Field; Hanover, NH	ESPN+	W 20–17	3,392
November 15	1:00 p.m.	Cornell	Memorial Field; Hanover, NH (rivalry)	ESPN+	W 24–14	3,523
November 22	12:00 p.m.	at Brown	Brown Stadium; Providence, RI	ESPN+	L 28–35	1,463
*Non-conference game; ^{†}Homecoming; Rankings from STATS Poll released prior to the game; All times are in Eastern time

== Game summaries ==
=== No. 25 New Hampshire (rivalry) ===
No. 25 New Hampshire Wildcats (2–1) at Dartmouth Big Green (0–0) – Game summary

Quarter	1	2	3	4	Total
No. 25 Wildcats	10	0	3	7	20
Big Green	0	7	6	14	27

at Memorial Field, Hanover, NH

- Date: September 20
- Game time: 1:00 p.m.
- Game weather: Sunny • Temperature: 65 °F (18 °C) • Wind: N at 10 miles per hour (16 km/h)
- Game attendance: 4,457
- Referee: Antonio Marcella
- TV announcers (ESPN+): Bob Lipman (play-by-play)

Game information

First quarter

- UNH - Matt Vezza 1-yard run (Nick Reed kick), 9:03. Wildcats 7-0. Drive: 5 plays, 13 yards, 2:38.
- UNH - Nick Reed 32-yard field goal, 1:00. Wildscats 10-0. Drive: 7 plays, 46 yards, 3:23.

Second quarter

- DART - D.J. Crowther 4-yard run (Owen Zalc kick), 11:27. Wildcats 10-7. Drive: 9 plays, 75 yards, 4:33

Third quarter

- DART - D.J. Crowther 16-yard run (Owen Zalc kick failed), 9:45. Big Green 13-10. Drive: 6 plays, 53 yards, 2:50.
- UNH - Nick Reed 52-yard field goal, 3:21. Tied 13-13. Drive: 13, 41 yards, 6:17.

Fourth quarter

- DART - D.J. Crowther 33-yard run (pass failed), 10:05. Big Green 19-13. Drive: 8 plays, 87 yards, 4:07.
- UNH - Chase Wilson 38-yard pass from Matt Vezza (Nick Reed kick), 7:43. Wildcats 20-19. Drive: 4 plays, 68 yards, 2:14.
- DART - Grayson Saunier 1-yard run (Grayson Saunier run), 2:53. Big Green 27-20. Drive: 9 plays, 75 yards, 4:50.

Statistics	UNH	DART
First downs	17	21
Plays–yards	64–361	63–432
Rushes–yards	29–88	33–188
Passing yards	273	244
Passing: Comp–Att–Int	22–35–2	22–30–1
Turnovers	2	1
Time of possession	27:57	32:03

Team	Category	Player	Statistics
New Hampshire	Passing	Matt Vezza	22/35, 273 yards, TD, 2 INT
New Hampshire	Rushing	Matt Vezza	13 carries, 33 yards, TD
New Hampshire	Receiving	Chase Wilson	6 receptions, 120 yards, TD
Dartmouth	Passing	Grayson Saunier	22/30, 244 yards, INT
Dartmouth	Rushing	D.J. Crowther	20 carries, 143 yards, 3 TD
Dartmouth	Receiving	Grayson O'Bara	6 receptions, 106 yards

=== at Central Connecticut ===
Dartmouth Big Green (1–0) at Central Connecticut Blue Devils (2–2) – Game summary

Quarter	1	2	3	4	Total
Big Green	7	13	0	15	35
Blue Devils	14	0	0	14	28

at Arute Field, New Britain, CT

- Date: September 27
- Game time: 12:00 p.m.
- Game weather: Sunny • Temperature: 74 °F (23 °C) • Wind: N at 2 miles per hour (3.2 km/h)
- Game attendance: 4,019
- Referee: Michael Davis
- TV announcers (NEC Front Row): Bruce Biel (play-by-play) and Marc Robbins (analyst)

Game information
First quarter
- CCSU - Dave Pardo 6-yard pass from Brady Olson (Jack Hennessey kick), 7:30. Blue Devils 7-0. Drive: 6 plays, 38 yards, 2:15.
- DART - D.J. Crowther 2-yard run (Owen Zalc kick), 5:38. Tied 7-7. Drive: 4 plays, 75 yards, 1:52.
- CCSU - Paul Marsh Jr. 12-yard pass from Brady Olson (Jack Hennessey kick), 1:23. Blue Devils 14-7. Drive: 9 plays 68 yards, 4:09.

Second quarter

- DART - D.J. Crowther 12-yard run (Owen Zalc kick), 9:24. Tied 14-14. Drive: 6 plays 53 yards, 2:19.
- DART - Owen Zalc 36-yard Field Goal, 6:24. Big Green 17-14. Drive: 7 plays, 17 yards, 2:14.
- DART - Owen Zalc 27-yard Field Goal, 0:00. Big Green 20-14. Drive: 15 plays, 76 yards, 2:54.

Third quarter

- No scoring plays

Fourth quarter

- CCSU - Elijah Howard 9-yard run (Jack Hennessey kick), 14:52. Blue Devils 21-20. Drive: 11 plays. 80 yards, 4:13.
- DART - Chris Corbo 26-yard pass from Grayson Saunier (Grayson Saunier run for Two-Point Conversion), 5:56. Big Green 28-21. Drive: 9 plays, 89 yards, 3:42.
- CCSU - Michael Trovarelli 5-yard pass from Brady Olson (Jack Hennessey kick), 0:58. Tied 28-28. Drive: 12 plays, 80 yards, 4:57.
- DART - Ky'Dric Fisher 50-yard pass from Grayson Saunier (Owen Zalc kick), 0:16. Big Green 35-28. Drive: 5 plays, 75 yards, 0:42.

Statistics	DART	CCSU
First downs	31	23
Total yards	524	289
Rushing yards	117	66
Passing yards	407	223
Turnovers	2	2
Time of possession	32:29	27:31

Team	Category	Player	Statistics
Dartmouth	Passing	Grayson Saunier	30/44, 407 yards, 2 TD, INT
Dartmouth	Rushing	D.J. Crowther	24 carries, 86 yards, 2 TD
Dartmouth	Receiving	Grayson O'Bara	7 receptions, 128 yards
Central Connecticut	Passing	Brady Olson	25/33, 223 yards, 3 TD
Central Connecticut	Rushing	Elijah Howard	14 carries, 69 yards, TD
Central Connecticut	Receiving	Dave Pardo	6 receptions, 42 yards, TD

=== at Penn ===
Dartmouth Big Green (2–0) at Penn Quakers (1–1) – Game summary

Quarter	1	2	3	4	Total
Big Green	7	10	7	0	24
Quakers	3	14	9	10	36

at Franklin Field, Philadelphia, PA

- Date: October 4
- Game time: 1:00 p.m.
- Game weather: Clear, 79 °F (26 °C)
- Game attendance: 6,541
- Referee: Henry Wimburg
- TV announcers (ESPN+): Joe Tordy (play-by-play) and Joe Valerio (analyst)

Game information
First quarter
- DART – Grayson Saunier 17-yard run (Owen Zalc kick), 11:51. Big Green 7–0. Drive: 6 plays, 54 yards, 3:00.
- PENN - Mason Walters 22-yard Field Goal, 5:15. Big Green 7-3. Drive: 12 plays, 59 yards, 6:29.

Second quarter

- DART - Grayson Saunier 3-yard run (Owen Zalc kick), 12:50. Big Green 14-3. Drive: 14 plays, 70 yards, 7:20.
- PENN - Liam O'Brien 1-yard run (Mason Walters kick), 9:47. Big Green 14-10. Drive: 3 plays, 19 yards, 1:24.
- DART - Owen Zalc 26-yard Field Goal, 2:09. Big Green 17-10. Drive: 14 plays, 67 yards, 7:38.
- PENN - Bisi Owens 9-yard pass from Liam O'Brien (Mason Walters kick), 0:16. Tied 17-17. Drive: 7 plays, 65 yards, 1:16.

Third quarter

- PENN - Team Safety, 12:30. Quakers 19-17. Drive: 5 plays, 11 yards, 2:30.
- PENN - Cadin Olsen 12-yard pass from Liam O'Brien (Mason Walters kick), 9:26. Quakers 26-17. Drive: 6 plays, 48 yards, 2:56.
- DART - D.J. Crowther 12-yard run (Owen Zalc kick), 6:23. Quakers 26-24. Drive: 8 plays, 75 yards, 3:03.

Fourth quarter

- PENN - Liam O'Brien 2-yard run (Mason Walters kick), 11:27. Quakers 33-24. Drive: 6 plays, 28 yards, 2:34.
- PENN - Mason Walters 30-yard Field Goal, 4:44. Quakers 36-24. Drive: 6 plays, 16 yards, 2:31.

Statistics	DART	PENN
First downs	23	19
Total yards	326	323
Rushing yards	184	162
Passing yards	142	161
Turnovers	3	1
Time of possession	31:17	28:43

Team	Category	Player	Statistics
Dartmouth	Passing	Grayson Saunier	16/30, 142 yards, 2 INT
Dartmouth	Rushing	D. J. Crowther	17 carries, 86 yards, TD
Dartmouth	Receiving	Chris Corbo	5 receptions, 52 yards
Penn	Passing	Liam O'Brien	16/21, 147 yards, 2 TD, INT
Penn	Rushing	Liam O'Brien	19 carries, 99 yards, 2 TD
Penn	Receiving	Bisi Owens	4 receptions, 46 yards, TD

=== Yale ===
Yale Bulldogs (2–1) at Dartmouth Big Green (2–1) – Game summary

Quarter	1	2	3	4	Total
Bulldogs	0	3	7	6	16
Big Green	0	0	0	17	17

at Memorial Field, Hanover, NH

- Date: October 11
- Game time: 1:30 p.m. EDT
- Game weather: Sunny, SW 7 mph
- Game attendance: 7,895
- Referee: Jeremy DeAngulo
- TV announcers (ESPN+): Matt Corsetti (play-by-play) and Ryan Zimmerman (analyst)

Game information
First quarter
- No scoring plays

Second quarter

- YALE - Nick Conforti 41-yard Field Goal, 7:27. Bulldogs 3-0. Drive: 11 plays, 39 yards, 4:45.

Third quarter

- YALE - Nico Brown 6-yard pass from Dante Reno (Noah Piper kick), 4:59. Bulldogs 10-0. Drive: 1 play, 6 yards, 0:07.

Fourth quarter

- DART - Grayson Saunier 6-yard run (Owen Zalc kick), 10:24. Bulldogs 10-7. Drive: 11 plays, 92 yards, 5:11.
- DART - Grayson Saunier 37-yard run (Owen Zalc kick), 4:13. Big Green 14-10. Drive: 6 plays, 75 yards, 3:00.
- YALE - Graham Smith 4-yard pass from Dante Reno (Noah Piper PAT failed), 0:37. Bulldogs 16-14. Drive: 13 plays, 70 yards, 3:29.
- DART - Owen Zalc 51-yard Field Goal, 0:00. Big Green 17-16. Drive: 7 plays, 42 yards, 0:37.

Statistics	YALE	DART
First downs	22	25
Total yards	352	367
Rushing yards	156	209
Passing yards	196	158
Turnovers	1	1
Time of possession	30:04	29:56

Team	Category	Player	Statistics
Yale	Passing	Dante Reno	19/32, 196 yards, 2 TD, INT
Yale	Rushing	Josh Pitsenberger	34 carries, 138 yards
Yale	Receiving	Nico Brown	8 receptions, 113 yards, TD
Dartmouth	Passing	Grayson Saunier	15/22, 158 yards
Dartmouth	Rushing	Grayson Saunier	14 carries, 95 yards, 2 TD
Dartmouth	Receiving	Grayson O'Bara	5 receptions, 69 yards

=== at Fordham ===
Dartmouth Big Green (3-1) vs. Fordham Rams (1-5) – Game summary

Quarter	1	2	3	4	Total
Big Green	0	6	10	14	30
Rams	0	6	0	7	13

at Coffey Field • New York City, NY

- Date: October 18
- Game time: 1:00 PM EDT
- Game attendance: 3,814
- Referee: Todd Boyd
- TV announcers (ESPN+): Andrew Bogusch (play-by-play) and Andrew Posadas (analyst)

Game information

First Quarter

- No Scoring Plays

Second Quarter

- DART - Owen Zalc 42-yard Field Goal, 11:34. Big Green 3-0. Drive: 7 plays, 36 yards, 3:14.
- FOR - Bennett Henderson 29-yard Field Goal, 4:42. Tied 3-3. Drive: 15 plays, 76 yards, 6:44.
- DART - Owen Zalc 33-yard Field Goal, 0:40. Big Green 6-3. Drive: 12 plays 60 yards, 4:02.
- FOR - Bennett Henderson 22-yard Field Goal, 0:00. Tied 6-6. Drive: 3 plays, 23 yards, 0:15.

Third Quarter

- DART - D.J. Crowther 20-yard run (Owen Zalc kick), 13:27. Big Green 13-6. Drive: 5 plays, 42 yards, 1:33.
- DART - Owen Zalc 24-yard Field Goal, 3:53. Big Green 16-6. Drive: 8 plays, 64 yards, 2:56.

Fourth Quarter

- FOR - Jack Freeburg 5-yard pass from Gunnar Smith (Bennett Henderson kick), 11:37. Big Green 16-13. Drive: 2 plays, 36 yards, 0:43.
- DART - Luke Rives 24-yard pass from Grayson Saunier (Owen Zalc kick), 9:21. Big Green 23-13. Drive: 5 plays, 75 yards, 2:16.
- DART - Grayson O'Bara 33-yard pass from Grayson Saunier (Owen Zalc kick), 4:32. Big Green 30-13. Drive: 5 plays, 60 yards, 3:05.

Statistics	DART	FOR
First downs	20	17
Total yards	461	328
Rushing yards	180	90
Passing yards	281	238
Turnovers	2	1
Time of possession	30:42	29:18

Team	Category	Player	Statistics
Dartmouth	Passing	Grayson Saunier	21/29, 281 yards, 2 TD
Dartmouth	Rushing	D.J. Crowther	18 carries, 91 yards, TD
Dartmouth	Receiving	Grayson O'Bara	7 receptions, 104 yards, TD
Fordham	Passing	Gunnar Smith	21/35, 238 yards, TD, INT
Fordham	Rushing	Ricky Parks	12 carries, 46 yards
Fordham	Receiving	Jack Freeburg	6 receptions, 64 yards, TD

=== Columbia ===
Columbia Lions (1–4) at Dartmouth Big Green (4–1) – Game summary

Quarter	1	2	3	4	Total
Lions	0	0	0	3	3
Big Green	21	14	14	0	49

at Memorial Field, Hanover, NH

- Date: October 24
- Game time: 6:00 p.m. EDT
- Game weather: Sunny • Temperature: 50 °F (10 °C) • Wind: NW at 5 miles per hour (8.0 km/h)
- Game attendance: 3,471
- Referee: Alex Parrella
- TV announcers (ESPNU): Eric Frede (play-by-play) and Jack Ford (analyst)

Game information
First quarter
- DART - Tyson Grimm 75-yard interception return (Owen Zalc kick), 11:32. Big Green 7-0.
- DART - Grayson Saunier 24-yard run (Owen Zalc kick), 6:51. Big Green 14-0. Drive: 5 plays, 83 yards, 2:18.
- DART - No'Koi Maddox 19-yard punt return (Owen Zalc kick), 2:56. Big Green 21-0.

Second quarter

- DART - Grayson Saunier 13-yard run (Owen Zalc kick), 5:45. Big Green 28-0. Drive: 2 plays, 14 yards, 0:50
- DART - Grayson Saunier 1-yard run (Owen Zalc kick), 0:11. Big Green 35-0. Drive: 10 plays, 75 yards, 3:58.

Third quarter

- DART - Chris Corbo 35-yard pass from Grayson Saunier (Owen Zalc kick), 12:19. Big Green 42-0. Drive: 6 plays, 75 yards, 2:41.
- DART - Desmin Jackson 2-yard run (Owen Zalc kick), 0:06. Big Green 49-0. Drive: 16 plays, 69 yards, 10:04.

Fourth quarter

- COLU - Hugo Merry 26-yard Field Goal, 5:13. Big Green 49-3. Drive: 17 plays, 72 yards, 8:05.

Statistics	COLU	DART
First downs	17	18
Total yards	271	358
Rushing yards	156	192
Passing yards	115	166
Turnovers	2	0
Time of possession	31:03	28:57

Team	Category	Player	Statistics
Columbia	Passing	Caleb Sanchez	10/25, 105 yards, INT
Columbia	Rushing	Michael Walters	19 carries, 82 yards
Columbia	Receiving	Titus Evans	2 receptions, 32 yards
Dartmouth	Passing	Grayson Saunier	12/13, 162 yards, TD
Dartmouth	Rushing	D. J. Crowther	18 carries, 103 yards
Dartmouth	Receiving	Nick Lemon	3 receptions, 61 yards

=== at No. 12 Harvard (rivalry) ===
Dartmouth Big Green (5–1) at No. 12 Harvard Crimson (6–0) – Game summary

Quarter	1	2	3	4	Total
Big Green	0	0	10	0	10
No. 12 Crimson	14	3	0	14	31

at Harvard Stadium, Boston, MA

- Date: November 1
- Game time: 3:00 PM EDT
- Game weather: Sunny • Temperature: 54 °F (12 °C) • Wind: W at 14 miles per hour (23 km/h)
- Game attendance: 11,334
- Referee: Todd Boyd
- TV announcers (ESPN+): Alex Vispoli (play-by-play), Tim Murphy (analyst) and Amanda Keane (sideline)

Game information
First quarter
- HARV - Seamus Gilmartin 14-yard pass from Jaden Craig (Kieran Corr kick), 9:19. Crimson 7-0. Drive: 13 plays, 71 yards, 5:36.
- HARV - Brady Blackburn 74-yard pass from Jaden Craig (Kieran Corr kick), 1:32. Crimson 14-0. Drive: 3 plays, 75 yards, 0:57.

Second quarter

- HARV - Kieran Corr 38-yard Field Goal, 8:33. Crimson 17-0. Drive: 12 plays, 75 yards, 6:27.

Third quarter

- DART - Grayson Saunier 1-yard run (Owen Zalc kick), 9:32. Crimson 17-7. Drive: 12 plays, 75 yards, 5:28.
- DART - Owen Zalc 46-yard Field Goal, 3:54. Crimson 17-10. Drive: 10 plays, 24 yards, 4:16.

Fourth quarter

- HARV - Logan Reaska 14-yard pass from Jaden Craig (Kieran Corr kick), 12:47. Crimson 24-10. Drive: 11 plays, 79 yards, 5:58.
- HARV - Seamus Gilmartin 34-yard pass from Jaden Craig (Kieran Corr kick), 11:17. Crimson 31-10. Drive: 1 play, 34 yards, 0:07.

Statistics	DART	HARV
First downs	15	23
Total yards	261	432
Rushing yards	61	110
Passing yards	200	322
Turnovers	0	2
Time of possession	26:11	33:49

Team	Category	Player	Statistics
Dartmouth	Passing	Grayson Saunier	18/32, 200 yards
Dartmouth	Rushing	D.J. Crowther	9 carries, 24 yards
Dartmouth	Receiving	Chris Corbo	3 receptions, 56 yards
Harvard	Passing	Jaden Craig	21/32, 322 yards, 4 TD, 2 INT
Harvard	Rushing	Xaviah Bascon	9 carries, 49 yards
Harvard	Receiving	Brady Blackburn	3 receptions, 116 yards, TD

=== Princeton ===
Princeton Tigers (3-4) at Dartmouth Big Green (5-2) – Game summary

Quarter	1	2	3	4	Total
Tigers	0	3	0	14	17
Big Green	7	7	6	0	20

at Memorial Field, Hanover, NH

- Date: November 8
- Game time: 1:00 PM EST
- Game weather: Sunny • Temperature: 58 °F (14 °C) • Wind: NW at 6 miles per hour (9.7 km/h)
- Game attendance: 3,392
- Referee: Jeff Pumphrey
- TV announcers (ESPN+): Matt Corsetti (play-by-play) and Chris Jared (analyst)

Game information
First quarter
- DART - Grayson Saunier 1-yard run (Owen Zalc kick), 10:35. Big Green 7-0. Drive: 5 plays, 35 yards, 2:36.

Second quarter

- DART - DJ Crowther 3-yard run (Owen Zalc kick), 14:56. Big Green 14-0. Drive: 15 plays, 88 yards, 7:54.
- PRIN - Esteban Nunez Perez 36-yard field goal, 1:12. Big Green 14-3. Drive: 6 plays, 37 yards, 1:05.

Third quarter

- DART - Chris Corbo 25-yard pass from Grayson Saunier (Two-point pass failed), 11:01. Big Green 20-3. Drive: 7 plays, 75 yards, 3:59.

Fourth quarter

- PRIN - Christian Lynch 2-yard run (Two-point pass failed), 12:31. Big Green 20-9. Drive: 8 plays, 52 yards, 3:40.
- PRIN - Kai Colón 5-yard run (Two-point run GOOD), 0:33. Big Green 20-17. Drive: 11 plays, 80 yards, 2:41.

Statistics	PRIN	DART
First downs	26	13
Total yards	408	289
Rushing yards	142	137
Passing yards	266	152
Turnovers	2	0
Time of possession	33:33	26:27

Team	Category	Player	Statistics
Princeton	Passing	Kai Colón	29/46, 266 yards, 2 INT
Princeton	Rushing	Ethan Clark	12 carries, 69 yards
Princeton	Receiving	Josh Robinson	8 receptions, 70 yards
Dartmouth	Passing	Grayson Saunier	12/15, 152 yards, TD
Dartmouth	Rushing	DJ Crowther	20 carries, 96 yards, TD
Dartmouth	Receiving	Chris Corbo	4 receptions, 66 yards, TD

=== Cornell (rivalry) ===
Cornell Big Red (4–4) at Dartmouth Big Green (6–2) – Game summary

Quarter	1	2	3	4	Total
Big Red	0	7	0	7	14
Big Green	3	7	7	7	24

at Memorial Field, Hanover, NH

- Date: November 15
- Game time: 1:00 p.m. EDT
- Game weather: Sunny • Temperature: 42 °F (6 °C) • Wind: NW at 7 miles per hour (11 km/h)
- Game attendance: 3,523
- Referee: Henry Wimberg
- TV announcers (ESPN+): Matt Corsetti (play-by-play) and Jarod Richmond (analyst)

Game information
First quarter
- DART - Owen Zalc 25-yard Field Goal, 3:45. Big Green 3-0. Drive: 11 plays, 68 yards, 5:17.

Second quarter

- COR - Garrett Bass-Sulpizio 3-yard run (Caden Lesiewicz kick), 4:34. Big Red 7-3. Drive: 14 plays, 96 yards, 5:35.
- DART - D.J. Crowther 67-yard run (Owen Zalc kick), 3:04. Big Green 14-7. Drive: 3 plays, 75 yards, 1:30.

Third quarter

- DART - D.J. Crowther 20-yard run (Owen Zalc kick), 8:22. Big Green 17-7. Drive: 11 plays, 72 yards, 4:44.

Fourth quarter

- DART - Grayson Saunier 1-yard run (Owen Zalc kick), 14:17. Big Green 24-7. Drive: 12 plays, 63 yards, 6:30.
- COR - TJ Hamilton 33-yard pass from Garrett Bass-Sulpizio (Caden Lesiewicz kick), 8:02. Big Green 24-14. Drive: 8 plays, 77 yards, 2:52.

Statistics	COR	DART
First downs	21	20
Total yards	369	376
Rushing yards	41	254
Passing yards	328	122
Turnovers	1	0
Time of possession	24:54	35:06

Team	Category	Player	Statistics
Cornell	Passing	Garrett Bass-Sulpizio	37/45, 328 yards, TD
Cornell	Rushing	Jordan Triplett	12 carries, 46 yards
Cornell	Receiving	Ryder Kurtz	9 receptions, 91 yards
Dartmouth	Passing	Grayson Saunier	13/23, 122 yards
Dartmouth	Rushing	D.J. Crowther	31 carries, 197 yards, 2 TD
Dartmouth	Receiving	Chris Corbo	5 receptions, 53 yards

=== at Brown ===
Dartmouth Big Green (7-2) at Brown Bears (4-5) – Game summary

Quarter	1	2	Total
Big Green			0
Bears			0

at Brown Stadium, Providence, RI

- Date: November 22
- Game time: 12:00 p.m. EDT
- TV announcers (ESPN+): Scott Cordischi (play-by-play) and John Anderson (analyst)

Game information
First quarter

Second quarter Third quarter Fourth quarter

Statistics	DART	BRWN
First downs		
Total yards		
Rushing yards		
Passing yards		
Turnovers		
Time of possession		

Team	Category	Player	Statistics
Dartmouth	Passing		
Dartmouth	Rushing		
Dartmouth	Receiving		
Brown	Passing		
Brown	Rushing		
Brown	Receiving		

== Roster ==
2025 Dartmouth Big Green football team roster
Players
Coaches
Offense

Pos.	#	Name	Class
WR	2	Nick Lemon	Jr
WR	4	Ian Scott	Jr
RB	6	Dylan Elder	So
TE	7	Chris Corbo	Sr
WR	8	Jack Inglis	So
QB	9	Charlie Peters	Fr
RB	10	Desmin Jackson	Sr
WR	11	Daniel Haughton	Sr
QB	12	Jaden Cummings	Fr
QB	13	Woods Ray	Jr
WR	14	Luke Rives	So
RB	15	D.J. Crowther	Sr
QB	16	Grayson Saunier	Jr
TE	17	Kyle Meier	So
QB	18	Noah Trigueros	So
WR	19	Grayson O'Bara	Sr
RB	20	Colin O'Garro	Jr
RB	28	Chris Roper	Jr
RB	29	Immanuel Johnson	Fr
WR	30	Romello McRae	Fr
RB	36	Myles Craddock	Fr
WR	37	Cameron Bates	Fr
TE	40	John Bancone	Fr
TE	41	Corban Hall	Fr
TE	42	Jason Bish	Fr
OL	50	Max Livingston	Jr
OL	59	Paul Binder	Fr
OL	60	Julian Sutton	So
OL	61	Yuseph Mustafa	Fr
OL	62	Hashem Saleh	Fr
OL	63	Anthony Ndika	So
OL	64	Ryan Turk	So
OL	66	Maxwell Wentz	Sr
OL	67	Mateusz Nycz	Fr
OL	68	Francisco Caballero	Jr
OL	69	Konstantin Spörk	Sr
OL	70	Ben Reagan	So
OL	71	Will Prince	Jr
OL	72	Vasean Washington	Sr
OL	73	Roland Waguespack	Jr
OL	74	Delby Lemieux	Sr
OL	77	Cam Davenport	Jr
OL	78	Godson Ajoku	Jr
OL	79	Jack Taylor	Fr
WR	80	Remington Gall	Sr
WR	81	Andrew Smart	Fr
WR	82	Jonathan Nelson	Jr
WR	83	James Elliott	So
WR	84	Jordan Leslie	So
WR	85	Ky'Dric Fisher	So
WR	86	Aiden Abercrombie	Fr
TE	87	Taysire Williams	Jr
TE	88	Kristian Strong	So
TE	89	Sean Ward	Sr

Defense

Pos.	#	Name	Class
LB	0	Zyion Freer-Brown	Sr
DL	1	Dakota Quiñonez	Sr
DB	3	Jamal Cooper	Sr
DB	5	Patrick Campbell	Sr
DB	8	Cameron Best-Alston	Jr
DB	9	Sean Williams	Sr
DB	12	Thai Brown	So
DB	13	Tyson Grimm	Sr
CB	21	Jorden Barnes	Jr
DB	22	Samuel Washington	Jr
DB	23	Christian Harris	So
S	24	Harrison Keith	Jr
DB	25	Lou Lamar	So
DB	26	No'Koi Maddox	So
DB	27	Niquis Ratcliff	So
DB	30	K.J. Edwards	Jr
DB	32	Colter Vela	Fr
LB	33	Johnny Riley	So
DB	34	Santino Cicarella	Fr
DB	38	Johnny Stephens	Fr
DB	39	Ethan Couvertiere	Fr
DL	43	Gergely Hudák	So
DE	44	Joshua Johnson	Jr
DL	45	Matisse Brosseau	Fr
DB	47	Jackson Cheatham	Fr
DE	48	Aidan White	So
LB	50	Steve Simpkins Jr.	Jr
LB	51	Thaddeus Gianaris	Sr
LB	52	Sean Chester	So
LB	53	Nico Schwikal	Sr
LB	54	Matthew Boydell	Fr
LB	56	Charlie Prior	Fr
LB	57	Cameron Lee	Jr
LB	58	Uche Odimegwu	Fr
DL	90	Taylor Faalele	So
DE	91	Ben Devall	So
DE	92	Khari Mayeux	So
DE	93	Jabari Johnson	Sr
DL	94	Joe Onuwabhagbe	Sr
DE	95	Bruce Williams	Jr
DL	96	Chris Chol	Fr
DE	97	Keoni Perkins	Jr
DL	98	Jackson Ashford	So
DL	99	Peter Owolabi	Fr

Special teams

Pos.	#	Name	Class
K	5	Coviello
LS	31	Andy Belles	Jr
K	35	Owen Zalc	Jr
P	36	Luke Armistead	So
PK	37	Matisse Weaver	Jr

Head coach

- Sammy McCorkle

Coordinators/assistant coaches

- Don Dobes – Defensive coordinator/Linebackers
- Shane Montgomery – Offensive coordinator/Quarterbacks
- Braxton Chapman – Special Teams/Running Backs
- Kevin Daft – Tight ends
- Keith Clark – Offensive line
- Duane Brooks – Defensive line
- Levorn Harbin – Outside linebackers
- Mike Johnson - Cornerbacks
- Kevin Bracken – Secondary
- Mitchell Thompson – Wide receivers
- David Coleman - Defensive Quality Control
- Grayson Kline - Offensive Quality Control

Legend

- (C) Team captain
- (S) Suspended
- (I) Ineligible
- Injured
- Redshirt

Roster
