= 2025 Penn Quakers football team =

American college football season

2025 Penn Quakers football
- Conference: Ivy League
- Record: 6–4 (4–3 Ivy)
- Head coach: Ray Priore (10th season)
- Offensive coordinator: Greg Chimera (2nd season)
- Offensive scheme: Spread option
- Defensive coordinator: Bob Benson (10th season)
- Base defense: 3–3–5
- Home stadium: Franklin Field

2025 Ivy League football standings
	Conf.			Overall
Team	W		L	W		L
No. 15 Yale +^	6	–	1	9	–	3
No. 20 Harvard +^	6	–	1	9	–	2
Dartmouth	4	–	3	7	–	3
Penn	4	–	3	6	–	4
Cornell	3	–	4	4	–	6
Princeton	2	–	5	3	–	7
Brown	2	–	5	5	–	5
Columbia	1	–	6	2	–	8
+ – Conference co-champions; ^ – FCS playoff participant; Rankings from STATS Poll

The 2025 Penn Quakers football team represented the University of Pennsylvania as a member of the Ivy League during the 2025 NCAA Division I FCS football season. The team was led by tenth-year head coach Ray Priore and played its home games at Franklin Field in Philadelphia.

== Preseason ==
=== Preseason poll ===
On August 4, the Ivy League released its preseason prediction poll. The Quakers were selected to finish sixth in the conference.

== Schedule ==
Date	Time	Opponent	Site	TV	Result	Attendance
September 20	1:00 p.m.	at Stonehill*	W.B. Mason Stadium; Easton, MA	NEC Front Row	W 24–21	3,800
September 27	12:00 p.m.	at No. 10 Lehigh*	Goodman Stadium; Lower Saucon, PA	ESPN+	L 30–44	8,435
October 4	1:00 p.m.	Dartmouth	Franklin Field; Philadelphia, PA	ESPN+	W 36–24	6,541
October 10	7:00 p.m.	Marist*	Franklin Field; Philadelphia, PA	ESPN+	W 28–9	1,164
October 18	1:30 p.m.	at Columbia	Robert K. Kraft Field at Lawrence A. Wien Stadium; New York, NY	ESPN+	W 35–21	12,704
October 25	12:00 p.m.	at Yale	Yale Bowl; New Haven, CT	ESPN+	L 13–35	4,412
October 31	7:00 p.m.	Brown	Franklin Field; Philadelphia, PA	ESPNU	W 28–21	1,458
November 8	1:00 p.m.	Cornell^{†}	Franklin Field; Philadelphia, PA (rivalry)	ESPN+	L 17–39	10,914
November 15	12:00 p.m.	at No. 7 Harvard	Harvard Stadium; Boston, MA (rivalry)	ESPN+	L 43–45	8,256
November 22	1:00 p.m.	Princeton	Franklin Field; Philadelphia, PA (rivalry)	ESPN+	W 17–6	3,093
*Non-conference game; ^{†}Homecoming; Rankings from STATS Poll released prior to the game; All times are in Eastern time

== Game summaries ==
=== at Stonehill ===
Penn Quakers (0–0) at Stonehill Skyhawks (1–2) – Game summary

Quarter	1	2	3	4	Total
Quakers	14	7	0	3	24
Skyhawks	7	0	0	14	21

at W.B. Mason Stadium, Easton, Massachusetts

- Date: September 20
- Game time: 1:00 p.m. EDT
- Game weather: Sunny, 66 °F (19 °C)
- Game attendance: 3,800
- Referee: Jonathan Grande
- TV announcers (NEC Front Row): Charlie Bergeron (play-by-play) and Peter Czymbor (analyst)
- Box score, Recap

Game information
First quarter
- PENN – Jared Richardson 69-yard pass from Liam O'Brien (Sam Smith kick), 14:10. Quakers 7–0. Drive: 3 plays, 74 yards, 0:43.
- PENN – Julien Stokes 63-yard punt return (Sam Smith kick), 7:13. Quakers 14–0.
- STO – Myles Wilson 11-yard pass from Jack O'Connell (Domenic Scalese kick), 1:28. Quakers 14–7. Drive: 10 plays, 75 yards, 5:45.

Second quarter

- PENN – Sean Williams Jr. 1-yard run (Sam Smith kick), 12:05. Quakers 21–7. Drive: 10 plays, 49 yards, 4:13.

Third quarter

- No scoring plays

Fourth quarter

- STO – Zavion Woodard 5-yard run (Demonic Scalese kick), 14:54. Quakers 21–14. Drive: 6 plays, 38 yards, 3:11.
- STO – Torance Washington Jr. 28-yard pass from Jack O'Connell (Domenic Scalese kick), 5:32. Tied 21–21. Drive: 13 plays, 99 yards, 6:45.
- PENN – Sam Smith 45-yard field goal, 0:09. Quakers 24–21. Drive: 7 plays, 35 yards, 1:37.

Statistics	PENN	STO
First downs	17	17
Total yards	375	261
Rushing yards	137	96
Passing yards	238	165
Turnovers	1	0
Time of possession	27:57	32:03

Team	Category	Player	Statistics
Penn	Passing	Liam O'Brien	16/31, 238 yards, TD, INT
Penn	Rushing	Julien Stokes	11 rushes, 52 yards
Penn	Receiving	Jared Richardson	5 receptions, 103 yards, TD
Stonehill	Passing	Jack O'Connell	18/26, 165 yards, 2 TD
Stonehill	Rushing	Zavion Woodard	11 rushes, 34 yards, TD
Stonehill	Receiving	Torance Washington Jr.	5 receptions, 59 yards, TD

=== at No. 10 Lehigh ===
Penn Quakers (1–0) at No. 10 Lehigh Mountain Hawks (4–0) – Game summary

Quarter	1	2	3	4	Total
Quakers	7	7	6	10	30
No. 10 Mountain Hawks	13	3	7	21	44

at Goodman Stadium, Lower Saucon Township, Pennsylvania

- Date: September 27
- Game time: 12:00 p.m. EDT
- Game weather: Sunny
- Game attendance: 8,435
- Referee: Todd Boyd
- TV announcers (ESPN+): Marco Socci (play-by-play) and Lance Haynes (analyst)

Game information

First Quarter

- (LEH): 12:08 - Nick Garrido 35 Yard field goal (Drive: 7 plays, 47 yards, 2:45 LEH 3-0)
- (LEH): 6:00 - Matt D'Avino 22 Yard pass from Hayden Johnson, Nich Garrido kick (Drive: 9 plays, 77 yards, 4:39 LEH 10-0)
- (PENN): 4:15 - Bisi Owens 48 Yard pass from Liam O'Brien (Drive: 4 plays, 77 yards, 1:38 LEH 10-7)
- (LEH): 0:42 - Nick Garrido 33 Yard field goal (Drive: 9 plays, 53 yards, 3:27 LEH 13-7)

Second Quarter

- (LEH): 9:29 - Nick Garrido 25 Yard field goal (Drive: 7 plays, 21 yards, 3:18 LEH 16-7)
- (PENN): 5:20 - Liam O'Brien 4 Yard run, Sam Smith kick (Drive: 8 plays, 75 yards, 4:09 LEH 16-14)

Third Quarter

- (PENN): 14:05 - Jared Richardson 6 Yard pass from Liam O'Brien, Sam Smith missed kick (Drive: 2 plays, 40 yards, 0:45 PENN 20-16)
- (LEH): 8:59 - Geoffrey Jamiel 20 Yard run, Nick Garrido kick (Drive: 11 plays, 65 yards, 5:06 LEH 23-20)

Fourth Quarter

- (LEH): 14:52 - Geoffrey Jamiel 35 Yard pass from Hayden Johnson, Nick Garrido kick (Drive: 7 plays, 58 yards, 3:11 LEH 30-20)
- (PENN): 12:48 - Jared Richardson 18 Yard pass from Liam O'Brien, Mason Walters kick (Drive: 6 plays, 65 yards, 2:00 LEH 30-27)
- (LEH): 7:22 - Luke Yoder 1 Yard run, Nick Garrido kick (Drive: 5 plays, 20 yards, 2:47 LEH 37-27)
- (PENN): 4:50 - Mason Walters 32 Yard field goal (Drive: 6 plays, 56 yards, 2:26 LEH 37-30)
- (LEH): 0:58 - Luke Yoder 2 Yard run, Nick Garrido kick (Drive: 9 plays, 75 yards, 3:52 LEH 44-30)

Statistics	PENN	LEH
First downs	19	27
Total yards	345	539
Rushing yards	29	299
Passing yards	316	240
Turnovers	2	1
Time of possession	23:53	36:07

Team	Category	Player	Statistics
Penn	Passing	Liam O'Brien	28/37, 316 yards, 3 TD, INT
Penn	Rushing	Julien Stokes	5 carries, 37 yards
Penn	Receiving	Jared Richardson	12 receptions, 141 yards, 2 TD
Lehigh	Passing	Hayden Johnson	15/31, 240 yards, 2 TD
Lehigh	Rushing	Luke Yoder	25 carries, 173 yards, 2 TD
Lehigh	Receiving	Geoffrey Jamiel	8 receptions, 132 yards, TD

=== Dartmouth ===
Dartmouth Big Green (2–0) at Penn Quakers (1–1) – Game summary

Quarter	1	2	3	4	Total
Big Green	7	10	7	0	24
Quakers	3	14	9	10	36

at Franklin Field, Philadelphia, Pennsylvania

- Date: October 4
- Game time: 1:00 p.m. EDT
- Game weather: Clear, 79 °F (26 °C)
- Game attendance: 6,541
- Referee: Henry Wimburg
- TV announcers (ESPN+): Joe Tordy (play-by-play) and Joe Valerio (analyst)

Game information
First quarter
- (11:51) DART – Grayson Saunier 17-yard run, Owen Zalc kick (Drive: 6 plays, 54 yards, 3:00; Dartmouth 7–0)
- (5:15) PENN – Mason Walters 22-yard field goal (Drive: 12 plays, 59 yards, 6:29; Dartmouth 7–3)

Second quarter

- (12:50) DART – Grayson Saunier 3-yard run, Owen Zalc kick (Drive: 14 plays, 70 yards, 7:20; Dartmouth 14–3)
- (9:47) PENN – Liam O'Brien 1-yard run, Mason Walters kick (Drive: 3 plays, 19 yards, 1:24; Dartmouth 14–10)
- (2:09) DART – Owen Zalc 26-yard field goal (Drive: 14 plays, 67 yards, 7:38; Dartmouth 17–10)
- (0:16) PENN – Bisi Owens 9-yard pass from Liam O'Brien, Mason Walters kick (Drive: 7 plays, 65 yards, 1:16; Tied 17–17)

Third quarter

- (12:30) PENN – 0-yard safety (Penn 19–17)
- (9:26) PENN – Cadin Olsen 12-yard pass from Liam O'Brien, Mason Walters kick (Drive: 6 plays, 48 yards, 2:56; Penn 26–17)
- (6:23) DART – D. J. Crowther 12-yard run, Owen Zalc kick (Drive: 8 plays, 75 yards, 3:03; Penn 26–24)

Fourth quarter

- (11:27) PENN – Liam O'Brien 2-yard run, Mason Walters kick (Drive: 6 plays, 28 yards, 2:34; Penn 33–24)
- (4:44) PENN – Mason Walters 30-yard field goal (Drive: 6 plays, 16 yards, 2:31; Penn 36–24)

Statistics	DART	PENN
First downs	23	19
Total yards	326	323
Rushing yards	184	162
Passing yards	142	161
Turnovers	3	1
Time of possession	31:17	28:43

Team	Category	Player	Statistics
Dartmouth	Passing	Grayson Saunier	16/30, 142 yards, 2 INT
Dartmouth	Rushing	D. J. Crowther	17 carries, 86 yards, TD
Dartmouth	Receiving	Chris Corbo	5 receptions, 52 yards
Penn	Passing	Liam O'Brien	16/21, 147 yards, 2 TD, INT
Penn	Rushing	Liam O'Brien	19 carries, 99 yards, 2 TD
Penn	Receiving	Bisi Owens	4 receptions, 46 yards, TD

=== Marist ===
Marist Red Foxes (3–2) at Penn Quakers (2–1) – Game summary

Quarter	1	2	3	4	Total
Red Foxes	3	0	0	6	9
Quakers	7	7	0	14	28

at Franklin Field, Philadelphia, Pennsylvania

- Date: October 10
- Game time: 7:00 p.m. EDT
- Game weather: Cloudy • Temperature: 60 °F (16 °C) • Wind: SE at 6 miles per hour (9.7 km/h)
- Game attendance: 1,164
- Referee: Alexander Randolph
- TV announcers (ESPN+): Joe Tordy (play-by-play) and Joe Valerio (analyst)

Game information
First quarter
- (7:55) MRST – Samer Layous 43-yard field goal (Drive: 11 plays, 51 yards, 7:05; Marist 3–0)
- (4:53) PENN – Jared Richardson 21-yard pass from Liam O'Brien, Mason Walters kick (Drive: 7 plays, 65 yards, 3:02; Penn 7–3)

Second quarter

- (5:49) PENN – Liam O'Brien 21-yard run, Mason Walters kick (Drive: 6 plays, 57 yards, 2:47; Penn 14–3)

Third quarter

- No scoring plays

Fourth quarter

- (11:45) PENN – Jared Richardson 11-yard pass from Liam O'Brien, Mason Walters kick (Drive: 7 plays, 46 yards, 3:11; Penn 21–3)
- (10:28) MRST – Santino Correa 29-yard pass from Jeremy Decaro (Drive: 3 plays, 65 yards, 1:17; Penn 21–9)
- (3:03) PENN – Julien Stokes 1-yard run, Mason Walters kick (Drive: 3 plays, 25 yards, 1:31; Penn 28–9)

Statistics	MRST	PENN
First downs	15	22
Total yards	250	463
Rushing yards	98	128
Passing yards	152	335
Turnovers	1	0
Time of possession	29:47	30:13

Team	Category	Player	Statistics
Marist	Passing	Will O'Dell	14/22, 118 yards
Marist	Rushing	Will O'Dell	9 carries, 53 yards
Marist	Receiving	Reed Shumpert	6 receptions, 55 yards
Penn	Passing	Liam O'Brien	26/40, 335 yards, 2 TD
Penn	Rushing	Julien Stokes	13 carries, 59 yards, TD
Penn	Receiving	Jared Richardson	15 receptions, 190 yards, 2 TD

=== at Columbia ===
Penn Quakers (3–1) at Columbia Lions (1–3) – Game summary

Quarter	1	2	3	4	Total
Quakers	0	14	14	7	35
Lions	7	7	7	0	21

at Wien Stadium, New York City, NY

- Date: October 18
- Game time: 1:30 p.m. EDT
- Game weather: Sunny • Temperature: 64 °F (18 °C) • Wind: SW at 6 miles per hour (9.7 km/h)
- Game attendance: 12,704
- Referee: Justin Ackley
- TV announcers (ESPN+): Lance Medow (play-by-play) and Shawn FitzGerald (analyst)

Game information
First quarter
- (0:48) COLU – Michael Walters 1-yard run, Hugo Merry kick (Drive: 6 plays, 58 yards, 2:39; Columbia 7–0)

Second quarter

- (9:59) PENN – Jared Richardson 1-yard pass from Liam O'Brien, Mason Walters kick (Drive: 12 plays, 65 yards, 5:37; Tied 7–7)
- (5:51) COLU – Beckett Robinson 32-yard pass from Caleb Sanchez, Hugo Merry kick (Drive: 2 plays, 28 yards, 0:49; Columbia 14–7)
- (1:17) PENN – Bisi Owens 7-yard pass from Liam O'Brien, Mason Walters kick (Drive: 10 plays, 75 yards, 4:34; Tied 14–14)

Third quarter

- (8:52) PENN – Liam O'Brien 18-yard run, Mason Walters kick (Drive: 11 plays, 75 yards, 6:08; Penn 21–14)
- (3:48) COLU – Hutch Crow 2-yard pass from Caleb Sanchez, Hugo Merry kick (Drive: 12 plays, 75 yards, 5:04; Tied 21–21)
- (1:38) PENN – Jared Richardson 31-yard pass from Liam O'Brien, Mason Walters kick (Drive: 5 plays, 75 yards, 2:10; Penn 28–21)

Fourth quarter

- (10:18) PENN – Jared Richardson 76-yard pass from Liam O'Brien, Mason Walters kick (Drive: 1 play, 76 yards, 0:14; Penn 35–21)

Statistics	PENN	COLU
First downs	25	20
Total yards	458	366
Rushing yards	186	55
Passing yards	272	311
Turnovers	3	1
Time of possession	31:20	28:40

Team	Category	Player	Statistics
Penn	Passing	Liam O'Brien	17/26, 272 yards, 4 TD, 2 INT
Penn	Rushing	Liam O'Brien	15 carries, 81 yards, TD
Penn	Receiving	Jared Richardson	6 receptions, 157 yards, 3 TD
Columbia	Passing	Caleb Sanchez	27/47, 311 yards, 2 TD
Columbia	Rushing	Michael Walters	11 carries, 61 yards, TD
Columbia	Receiving	Titus Evans	7 receptions, 75 yards

=== at Yale ===
Penn Quakers (4–1) at Yale Bulldogs (3–2) – Game summary

Quarter	1	2	3	4	Total
Quakers	3	7	3	0	13
Bulldogs	7	21	7	0	35

at Yale Bowl, New Haven, CT

- Date: October 25
- Game time: 12:00 p.m. EDT
- Game attendance: 4,412
- Referee: Jeff Pumphrey
- TV announcers (ESPN+): Jim Cain (play-by-play) and Jack Siedlecki (analyst)

Game information

First quarter

- (13:11) PENN – Mason Walters 28-yard field goal (Drive: 4 plays, 4 yards, 1:05; Penn 3-0)
- (1:09) YALE – Josh Pitsenberger 10-yard run, Noah Piper kick (Drive: 10 plays, 85 yards, 4:45; Yale 7-3)

Second quarter

- (13:44) YALE – Abu Kamara 63-yard fumble return, Noah Piper kick (Drive: 5 plays, -18 yards, 2:21; Yale 14-3)
- (12:57) YALE – Jaxton Santiago 26-yard pass from Dante Reno, Noah Piper kick (Drive: 2 plays, 35 yards, 0:29; Yale 21-3)
- (6:56) PENN – Jared Richardson 13-yard pass from Liam O'Brien, Mason Walters kick (Drive: 11 plays, 77 yards, 5:52; Yale 21-10)
- (1:55) YALE – Nico Brown 19-yard pass from Dante Reno, Noah Piper kick (Drive: 6 plays, 67 yards, 2:53; Yale 28-10)

Third quarter

- (5:01) PENN – Mason Walters 28-yard field goal (Drive: 8 plays, 47 yards, 4:18; Penn 28-13)
- (1:53) YALE – Nico Brown 33-yard pass from Dante Reno, Noah Piper kick (Drive: 7 plays, 75 yards, 3:08; Yale 35-13)

Fourth quarter

No scoring plays

Statistics	PENN	YALE
First downs	24	21
Total yards	312	413
Rushing yards	92	202
Passing yards	220	211
Turnovers	2	2
Time of possession	36:44	23:16

Team	Category	Player	Statistics
Penn	Passing	Liam O'Brien	21/39, 220 yards, TD
Penn	Rushing	Donte West	11 carries, 47 yards
Penn	Receiving	Jared Richardson	6 receptions, 85 yards, TD
Yale	Passing	Dante Reno	16/22, 211 yards, 3 TD
Yale	Rushing	Josh Pitsenberger	22 carries, 145 yards, TD
Yale	Receiving	Nico Brown	8 receptions, 121 yards, 2 TD

=== Brown ===
Brown Bears (3–3) at Penn Quakers (4–2) – Game summary

Quarter	1	2	3	4	Total
Bears	7	0	7	7	21
Quakers	7	14	7	0	28

at Franklin Field, Philadelphia, PA

- Date: October 31
- Game time: 7:00 p.m. EDT
- Game weather: Cloudy • Temperature: 52 °F (11 °C) • Wind: W at 15 miles per hour (24 km/h)
- Game attendance: 1,458
- Referee: Anthony Florio
- TV announcers (ESPNU): Eric Frede (play-by-play) and Jack Ford (analyst)

Game information
First quarter
- (6:45) PENN – Donte West 1-yard run, Mason Walters kick (Drive: 11 plays, 58 yards, 4:51; Penn 7–0)
- (4:26) BRWN – Ty Pezza 44-yard pass from James Murphy, Drew Crabtree kick (Drive: 6 plays, 75 yards, 2:19; Tied 7–7)

Second quarter

- (14:10) PENN – Bisi Owens 9-yard pass from Liam O'Brien, Mason Walters kick (Drive: 10 plays, 70 yards, 5:08; Penn 14–7)
- (7:20) PENN – Sean Williams Jr. 1-yard run, Mason Walters kick (Drive: 8 plays, 74 yards, 3:35; Penn 21–7)

Third quarter

- (7:12) BRWN – Pearson Hill 4-yard pass from Najih Rahman, Drew Crabtree kick (Drive: 12 plays, 66 yards, 4:53; Penn 21–14)
- (4:56) PENN – Donte West 1-yard run, Mason Walters kick (Drive: 4 plays, 45 yards, 2:02; Penn 28–14)

Fourth quarter

- (4:19) BRWN – Trevor Foley 14-yard pass from James Murphy, Drew Crabtree kick (Drive: 10 plays, 76 yards, 3:47; Penn 28–21)

Statistics	BRWN	PENN
First downs	21	22
Total yards	397	453
Rushing yards	33	231
Passing yards	364	222
Turnovers	1	1
Time of possession	29:04	30:56

Team	Category	Player	Statistics
Brown	Passing	James Murphy	31/44, 360 yards, 2 TD, INT
Brown	Rushing	Matt Childs	9 carries, 26 yards
Brown	Receiving	Trevor Foley	5 receptions, 99 yards, TD
Penn	Passing	Liam O'Brien	18/27, 222 yards, TD, INT
Penn	Rushing	Sean Williams Jr.	13 carries, 89 yards, TD
Penn	Receiving	Jared Richardson	6 receptions, 104 yards

=== Cornell (rivalry) ===
Cornell Big Red (3–4) at Penn Quakers (5–2) – Game summary

Quarter	1	2	3	4	Total
Big Red	3	10	19	7	39
Quakers	0	10	7	0	17

at Franklin Field, Philadelphia, PA

- Date: November 8
- Game time: TBA
- Game weather: Sunny • Temperature: 64 °F (18 °C)
- Game attendance: 10,914
- Referee: Bill McKeever
- TV: ESPN+

Game information

First quarter

- (8:57) COR – Caden Lesiewicz 32-yard field goal (Drive: 7 plays, 45 yards, 2:04; Cornell 3-0)

Second quarter

- (14:54) PENN – Liam O'Brien 4-yard run, Mason Walters kick (Drive: 16 plays, 75 yards, 8:55; Penn 7-3)
- (11:40) COR – Caden Lesiewicz 23-yard field goal (Drive: 8 plays, 67 yards, 3:08; Penn 7-6)
- (2:43) PENN – Mason Walters 47-yard field goal (Drive: 14 plays, 46 yards, 8:57; Penn 10-6)
- (0:11) COR – Brendan Lee 2-yard pass from Garrett Bass-Sulpizio, Caden Lesiewicz kick (Drive: 10 plays, 75 yards, 2:32; Cornell 13-10)

Third quarter

- (14:02) COR – Jordan Triplett 3-yard run, Caden Lesiewicz PAT blocked (Drive: 3 plays, 24 yards, 0:49; Cornell 19-10)
- (9:26) COR – Gannon Carothers 22-yard run, two-point run conversion failed (Drive: 7 plays, 63 yards, 2:31; Cornell 25-10)
- (3:42) COR – Gannon Carothers 1-yard run, Caden Lesiewicz kick (Drive: 8 plays, 64 yards, 4:13; Cornell 32-10)
- (3:29) PENN – Donte West 75-yard run, Mason Walters kick (Drive: 1 play, 75 yards, 0:13; Cornell 32-17)

Fourth quarter

- (10:08) COR – Garrett Bass-Sulpizio 1-yard run, Caden Lesiewicz kick (Drive: 15 plays, 75 yards, 8:21; Cornell 39-17)

Statistics	COR	PENN
First downs	25	15
Total yards	448	304
Rushing yards	183	192
Passing yards	265	112
Turnovers	0	1
Time of possession	31:19	28:41

Team	Category	Player	Statistics
Cornell	Passing	Garrett Bass-Sulpizio	24/31, 265 yards, TD
Cornell	Rushing	Jordan Triplett	17 carries, 85 yards, TD
Cornell	Receiving	TJ Hamilton	5 receptions, 123 yards
Penn	Passing	Liam O'Brien	15/22, 112 yards
Penn	Rushing	Donte West	15 carries, 125 yards, TD
Penn	Receiving	Jared Richardson	5 receptions, 42 yards

=== at No. 7 Harvard (rivalry) ===
Penn Quakers (5–3) at No. 7 Harvard Crimson (8–0) – Game summary

Quarter	1	2	3	4	Total
Quakers	14	13	0	16	43
No. 7 Crimson	7	14	14	10	45

at Harvard Stadium, Boston, MA

- Date: November 15
- Game time: 12:00 p.m. EST
- Game weather: Sunny • Temperature: 45 °F (7 °C)
- Game attendance: 8,256
- Referee: Justin Ackley
- TV: ESPN+

Game information

First quarter

- (11:46) PENN – Donte West 1-yard run, Mason Walters kick (Drive: 5 plays, 83 yards, 2:20; Penn 7-0)
- (5:52) HARV – Xaviah Bascon 2-yard run, Kieran Corr kick (Drive: 13 plays, 75 yards, 5:54; 7-7)
- (1:39) PENN – Jared Richardson 26-yard pass from Liam O'Brien, Mason Walters kick (Drive: 9 plays, 75 yards, 4:13; Penn 14-7)

Second quarter

- (12:11) HARV – Xaviah Bascon 12-yard pass from Jaden Craig, Kieran Corr kick (Drive: 12 plays, 78 yards, 4:21; 14-14)
- (4:40) PENN – Donte West 1-yard run, Mason Walters kick (Drive: 13 plays, 77 yards, 7:24; Penn 21-14)
- (1:28) PENN – Jared Richardson 10-yard pass from Liam O'Brien, Mason Walters PAT blocked (Drive: 5 plays, 47 yards, 1:05; Penn 27-14)
- (0:02) HARV – Jaden Craig 2-yard run, Kieran Corr kick (Drive: 11 plays, 75 yards, 0:47; Penn 27-21)

Third quarter

- (5:36) HARV – Brady Blackburn 23-yard pass from Jaden Craig, Kieran Corr kick (Drive: 9 plays, 63 yards, 2:30; Harvard 28-27)
- (4:05) HARV – Ryan Osborne 82-yard pass from Jaden Craig, Kieran Corr kick (Drive: 2 plays, 72 yards, 0:32; Harvard 35-27)

Fourth quarter

- (14:21) PENN – Jared Richardson 7-yard pass from Liam O'Brien, two-point run conversion failed (Drive: 9 plays, 70 yards, 4:39; Harvard 35-33)
- (10:47) HARV – Xaviah Bascon 4-yard run, Kieran Corr kick (Drive: 9 plays, 41 yards, 3:34; Harvard 42-33)
- (3:45) PENN – Liam O'Brien 1-yard run, Mason Walters kick (Drive: 13 plays, 75 yards, 7:02; Harvard 42-40)
- (0:22) PENN – Mason Walters 30-yard field goal (Drive: 11 plays, 59 yards, 2:16; Penn 43-42)
- (0:05) HARV – Kieran Corr 53-yard field goal (Drive: 5 plays, 22 yards, 0:22; Harvard 45-43)

Statistics	PENN	HARV
First downs	33	30
Total yards	425	537
Rushing yards	154	147
Passing yards	271	390
Turnovers	0	0
Time of possession	33:46	26:14

Team	Category	Player	Statistics
Penn	Passing	Liam O'Brien	32/40, 271 yards, 3 TD
Penn	Rushing	Liam O'Brien	18 carries, 100 yards, TD
Penn	Receiving	Jared Richardson	10 receptions, 79 yards, 3 TD
Harvard	Passing	Jaden Craig	28/45, 390 yards, 3 TD
Harvard	Rushing	Xaviah Bascon	20 carries, 103 yards, 2 TD
Harvard	Receiving	Ryan Osborne	2 receptions, 90 yards, TD

=== Princeton (rivalry) ===
Princeton Tigers at Penn Quakers – Game summary

Quarter	1	2	3	4	Total
Tigers	3	3	0	0	6
Quakers	0	7	7	3	17

at Franklin Field, Philadelphia, PA

- Date: November 22
- Game time: TBA
- Game weather: Sunny
- Game attendance: 3,093
- Referee: Cory Hanson
- TV: ESPN+

Game information

First quarter

- (9:28) PRIN – Esteban Nunez Perez 32-yard field goal (Drive: 11 plays, 60 yards, 5:32; Princeton 3-0)

Second quarter

- (14:32) PENN – Davis Ellis 2-yard pass from Liam O'Brien, Mason Walters kick (Drive: 19 plays, 75 yards, 9:56; Penn 7-3)
- (1:51) PRIN – Esteban Nunez Perez 30-yard field goal (Drive: 13 plays, 43 yards, 5:22; Penn 7-6)

Third quarter

- (12:01) PENN – Bisi Owens 39-yard pass from Liam O'Brien, Mason Walters kick (Drive: 7 plays, 75 yards, 2:59; Penn 14-6)

Fourth quarter

- (10:22) PENN – Mason Walters 22-yard field goal (Drive: 8 plays, 75 yards, 3:26; Penn 17-6)

Statistics	PRIN	PENN
First downs	14	19
Total yards	227	323
Rushing yards	83	80
Passing yards	144	243
Turnovers	1	0
Time of possession	28:28	31:32

Team	Category	Player	Statistics
Princeton	Passing	Blaine Hipa	11/24, 120 yards, INT
Princeton	Rushing	Ethan Clark	14 carries, 36 yards
Princeton	Receiving	Josh Robinson	5 receptions, 68 yards
Penn	Passing	Liam O'Brien	22/31, 243 yards, 2 TD
Penn	Rushing	Donte West	12 carries, 37 yards
Penn	Receiving	Jared Richardson	12 receptions, 95 yards
