= 2025 Columbia Lions football team =

American college football season

2025 Columbia Lions football
- Conference: Ivy League
- Record: 2–8 (1–6 Ivy)
- Head coach: Jon Poppe (2nd season)
- Offensive coordinator: Seitu Smith (2nd season)
- Offensive scheme: Pro-style
- Defensive coordinator: Justin Stovall (4th season)
- Base defense: 3–3–5
- Home stadium: Robert K. Kraft Field at Lawrence A. Wien Stadium

2025 Ivy League football standings
	Conf.			Overall
Team	W		L	W		L
No. 15 Yale +^	6	–	1	9	–	3
No. 20 Harvard +^	6	–	1	9	–	2
Dartmouth	4	–	3	7	–	3
Penn	4	–	3	6	–	4
Cornell	3	–	4	4	–	6
Princeton	2	–	5	3	–	7
Brown	2	–	5	5	–	5
Columbia	1	–	6	2	–	8
+ – Conference co-champions; ^ – FCS playoff participant; Rankings from STATS Poll

The 2025 Columbia Lions football team represented Columbia University as a member of the Ivy League during 2025 NCAA Division I FCS football season. The Lions were led by second-year head coach Jon Poppe and play home games at Robert K. Kraft Field at Lawrence A. Wien Stadium.

== Preseason ==
=== Preseason poll ===
On August 4, Ivy League announced the preseason poll. Lions were selected to finish in the fourth position.

== Schedule ==
Date	Time	Opponent	Site	TV	Result	Attendance
September 19	6:00 p.m.	at Lafayette*	Fisher Stadium; Easton, PA	ESPN+	L 14–38	4,206
September 27	12:00 p.m.	Georgetown*	Robert K. Kraft Field at Lawrence A. Wien Stadium; New York, NY (Lou Little Cup)	ESPN+	W 19–10	3,909
October 3	7:30 p.m.	at Princeton	Princeton Stadium; Princeton, NJ	ESPNU	L 10–17	4,286
October 11	12:00 p.m.	No. 7 Lehigh*	Robert K. Kraft Field at Lawrence A. Wien Stadium; New York, NY	ESPN+	L 7–31	3,049
October 18	1:30 p.m.	Penn^{†}	Robert K. Kraft Field at Lawrence A. Wien Stadium; New York, NY	ESPN+	L 21–35	12,704
October 24	6:00 p.m.	at Dartmouth	Memorial Field; Hanover, NH	ESPNU	L 3–49	3,471
November 1	12:00 p.m.	at Yale	Yale Bowl; New Haven, CT	ESPN+	L 10–24	4,375
November 7	7:00 p.m.	No. 9 Harvard	Robert K. Kraft Field at Lawrence A. Wien Stadium; New York, NY	ESPNU	L 14–31	3,644
November 15	12:00 p.m.	Brown	Robert K. Kraft Field at Lawrence A. Wien Stadium; New York, NY	ESPN+	L 29–32	3,122
November 22	1:00 p.m.	at Cornell	Schoellkopf Field; Ithaca, NY (rivalry)	ESPN+	W 29–12	3,212
*Non-conference game; ^{†}Homecoming; Rankings from STATS Poll released prior to the game; All times are in Eastern time

== Game summaries ==
=== at Lafayette ===
Columbia Lions (0–0) at Lafayette Leopards (2–1) – Game summary

Quarter	1	2	3	4	Total
Lions	7	7	0	0	14
Leopards	10	7	14	7	38

at Fisher Stadium, Easton, PA

- Date: September 19
- Game time: 6:00 PM EDT
- Game weather: Sunny • Temperature: 80 °F (27 °C) • Wind: E at 7 miles per hour (11 km/h)
- Game attendance: 4,206
- Referee: Justin Ackley
- TV announcers (ESPN+): Gary Laubach (play-by-play), Mike Joseph (analyst) and Megan Caffrey (sideline)

Game information

First quarter

- (10:13) LAF – Jack Simonetta 37-yard field goal (Drive: 7 plays, 20 yards, 3:24; Lafayette 3-0)
- (7:32) LAF – Kente Edwards 13-yard run, Jack Simonetta kick (Drive: 3 plays, 61 yards, 1:16; Lafayette 10-0)
- (2:28) COLU – Hutch Crow 17-yard pass from Chase Goodwin, Hugo Merry kick (Drive: 11 plays, 75 yards, 5:04; Lafayette 10-7)

Second quarter

- (12:57) LAF – Kente Edwards 3-yard run, Jack Simonetta kick (Drive: 11 plays, 75 yards, 4:31; Lafayette 17-7)
- (0:59) COLU – Griffin Johnson 4-yard run, Hugo Merry kick (Drive: 12 plays, 74 yards, 5:27; Lafayette 17-14)

Third quarter

- (9:21) LAF – Kente Edwards 3-yard run, Jack Simonetta kick (Drive: 14 plays, 75 yards, 5:39; Lafayette 24-14)
- (6:45) LAF – Ethan Weber 1-yard run, Jack Simonetta kick (Drive: 6 plays, 46 yards, 1:56; Lafayette 31-14)

Fourth quarter

- (3:01) LAF – Ethan Weber 1-yard run, Jack Simonetta kick (Drive: 5 plays, 29 yards, 2:51; Lafayette 38-14)

Statistics	COLU	LAF
First downs	18	22
Total yards	289	398
Rushing yards	91	232
Passing yards	198	166
Turnovers	1	0
Time of possession	25:26	34:34

Team	Category	Player	Statistics
Columbia	Passing	Chase Goodwin	15/34, 195 yards, TD, INT
Columbia	Rushing	Michael Walters	12 carries, 63 yards
Columbia	Receiving	Titus Evans	3 receptions, 58 yards
Lafayette	Passing	Dean DeNobile	14/17, 166 yards
Lafayette	Rushing	Kente Edwards	25 carries, 150 yards, 3 TD
Lafayette	Receiving	Mason Kuehner	3 receptions, 58 yards

=== Georgetown ===
Georgetown Hoyas (2–2) at Columbia Lions (0–1) – Game summary

Quarter	1	2	3	4	Total
Hoyas	0	3	7	0	10
Lions	7	9	0	3	19

at Wien Stadium, New York City, NY

- Date: September 27
- Game time: 1:00 PM EDT
- Game weather: Sunny • Temperature: 75 °F (24 °C) • Wind: NE at 5 miles per hour (8.0 km/h)
- Game attendance: 3,909
- Referee: Todd Bowman
- TV announcers (ESPN+): Lance Medow (play-by-play) and Shawn Fitzgerald (analyst)

Game information

First quarter

- (2:53) COLU – Hutch Crow 4-yard pass from Chase Goodwin, Hugo Merry kick (Drive: 11 plays, 92 yards, 4:11; Columbia 7-0)

Second quarter

- (12:14) COLU – Chase Goodwin 1-yard run, Hugo Merry PAT failed (Drive: 11 plays, 92 yards, 4:11; Columbia 13-0)
- (3:18) GTWN – Thomas Anderson 45-yard field goal (Drive: 10 plays, 34 yards, 4:26; Columbia 13-3)
- (0:00) COLU – Hugo Merry 25-yard field goal (Drive: 11 plays, 53 yards, 3:08; Columbia 16-3)

Third quarter

- (5:34) GTWN – Jayden Sumpter 21-yard run, Thomas Anderson kick (Drive: 15 plays, 80 yards, 5:57; Columbia 16-10)

Fourth quarter

- (3:22) COLU – Hugo Merry 20-yard field goal (Drive: 6 plays, 17 yards, 3:44; Columbia 19-10)

Statistics	GTWN	COLU
First downs	13	17
Total yards	211	293
Rushing yards	144	136
Passing yards	67	157
Turnovers	3	1
Time of possession	29:12	30:48

Team	Category	Player	Statistics
Georgetown	Passing	Dex Thomas II	9/24, 67 yards, 3 INT
Georgetown	Rushing	Jayden Sumpter	25 carries, 92 yards, TD
Georgetown	Receiving	Jimmy Kibble	4 receptions, 37 yards
Columbia	Passing	Chase Goodwin	11/24, 151 yards, TD, INT
Columbia	Rushing	Michael Walters	16 carries, 48 yards
Columbia	Receiving	Titus Evans	3 receptions, 52 yards

=== at Princeton ===
Columbia Lions (1–1) at Princeton Tigers (1–1) – Game summary

Quarter	1	2	3	4	Total
Lions	10	0	0	0	10
Tigers	0	7	0	10	17

at Princeton Stadium, Princeton, NJ

- Date: October 3
- Game time: 7:30 PM EDT
- Game weather: Sunny • Wind: NE at 5 miles per hour (8.0 km/h)
- Game attendance: 4,286
- Referee: Bill McKeever
- TV announcers (ESPNU): Eric Frede (play-by-play) and Jack Ford (analyst)

Game information

First quarter

- (7:51) COLU – Hugo Merry 29-yard field goal (Drive: 11 plays, 58 yards, 5:49; Columbia 3-0)
- (0:14) COLU – Lucas Bullock 2-yard run, Hugo Merry kick (Drive: 10 plays, 89 yards, 5:07; Columbia 10-0)

Second quarter

- (0:49) PRIN – Asher Weiner 1-yard run, Esteban Nunez Perez kick (Drive: 2 plays, 1 yard, 0:43; Columbia 10-7)

Third quarter

No scoring plays

Fourth quarter

- (13:27) PRIN – Ethan Clark 2-yard run, Esteban Nunez Perez kick (Drive: 8 plays, 71 yards, 3:36; Princeton 14-10)
- (9:21) PRIN – Esteban Nunez Perez 38-yard field goal (Drive: 7 plays, 49 yards, 2:40; Princeton 17-10)

Statistics	COLU	PRIN
First downs	18	17
Total yards	315	352
Rushing yards	110	114
Passing yards	205	238
Turnovers	2	2
Time of possession	31:31	28:29

Team	Category	Player	Statistics
Columbia	Passing	Chase Goodwin	19/28, 165 yards, 2 INT
Columbia	Rushing	Griffin Johnson	10 rushes, 46 yards
Columbia	Receiving	Titus Evans	8 receptions, 93 yards
Princeton	Passing	Kai Colón	7/17, 145 yards, INT
Princeton	Rushing	Blaine Hipa	8 rushes, 38 yards
Princeton	Receiving	Josh Robinson	4 receptions, 73 yards

=== No. 7 Lehigh ===
No. 7 Lehigh Mountain Hawks (6–0) at Columbia Lions (1–2) – Game summary

Quarter	1	2	3	4	Total
No. 7 Mountain Hawks	7	10	14	0	31
Lions	0	0	7	0	7

at Wien Stadium, New York City, NY

- Date: October 11
- Game time: 12:00 p.m. EDT
- Game weather: Cloudy • Temperature: 64 °F (18 °C) • Wind: E at 7 miles per hour (11 km/h)
- Game attendance: 3,049
- Referee: Tom Zetts
- TV announcers (ESPN+): Lance Medow (play-by-play), Shawn Fitzgerald (analyst) and C.J. Brown (sideline)

Game information
First quarter
- (8:02) LEH – Matt Machalik 4-yard run, Nick Garrido kick (Drive: 12 plays, 77 yards, 5:38; Lehigh 7–0)

Second quarter

- (12:27) LEH – Luke Yoder 7-yard run, Nick Garrido kick (Drive: 4 plays, 70 yards, 2:21; Lehigh 14–0)
- (0:48) LEH – Nick Garrido 38-yard field goal (Drive: 9 plays, 60 yards, 2:59; Lehigh 17–0)

Third quarter

- (13:24) LEH – Geoffrey Jamiel 63-yard pass from Hayden Johnson, Nick Garrido kick (Drive: 3 plays, 72 yards, 1:29; Lehigh 24–0)
- (7:50) LEH – Matt Machalik 2-yard run, Nick Garrido kick (Drive: 8 plays, 48 yards, 4:17; Lehigh 31–0)
- (7:00) COLU – Titus Evans 74-yard pass from Xander Menapace, Hugo Merry kick (Drive: 2 plays, 83 yards, 0:43; Lehigh 31–7)

Fourth quarter

- No scoring plays

Statistics	LEH	COLU
First downs	18	9
Total yards	437	228
Rushing yards	193	39
Passing yards	244	189
Turnovers	0	2
Time of possession	37:27	22:33

Team	Category	Player	Statistics
Lehigh	Passing	Hayden Johnson	17/23, 240 yards, TD
Lehigh	Rushing	Hayden Johnson	8 carries, 68 yards
Lehigh	Receiving	Geoffrey Jamiel	9 receptions, 182 yards, TD
Columbia	Passing	Xander Menapace	11/21, 178 yards, TD, 2 INT
Columbia	Rushing	Xander Menapace	10 carries, 23 yards
Columbia	Receiving	Titus Evans	6 receptions, 111 yards, TD

=== Penn ===
Penn Quakers (3–1) at Columbia Lions (1–3) – Game summary

Quarter	1	2	3	4	Total
Quakers	0	14	14	7	35
Lions	7	7	7	0	21

at Wien Stadium, New York City, NY

- Date: October 18
- Game time: 1:30 p.m. EDT
- Game weather: Sunny • Temperature: 64 °F (18 °C) • Wind: SW at 6 miles per hour (9.7 km/h)
- Game attendance: 12,704
- Referee: Justin Ackley
- TV announcers (ESPN+): Lance Medow (play-by-play) and Shawn FitzGerald (analyst)

Game information
First quarter
- (0:48) COLU – Michael Walters 1-yard run, Hugo Merry kick (Drive: 6 plays, 58 yards, 2:39; Columbia 7–0)

Second quarter

- (9:59) PENN – Jared Richardson 1-yard pass from Liam O'Brien, Mason Walters kick (Drive: 12 plays, 65 yards, 5:37; Tied 7–7)
- (5:51) COLU – Beckett Robinson 32-yard pass from Caleb Sanchez, Hugo Merry kick (Drive: 2 plays, 28 yards, 0:49; Columbia 14–7)
- (1:17) PENN – Bisi Owens 7-yard pass from Liam O'Brien, Mason Walters kick (Drive: 10 plays, 75 yards, 4:34; Tied 14–14)

Third quarter

- (8:52) PENN – Liam O'Brien 18-yard run, Mason Walters kick (Drive: 11 plays, 75 yards, 6:08; Penn 21–14)
- (3:48) COLU – Hutch Crow 2-yard pass from Caleb Sanchez, Hugo Merry kick (Drive: 12 plays, 75 yards, 5:04; Tied 21–21)
- (1:38) PENN – Jared Richardson 31-yard pass from Liam O'Brien, Mason Walters kick (Drive: 5 plays, 75 yards, 2:10; Penn 28–21)

Fourth quarter

- (10:18) PENN – Jared Richardson 76-yard pass from Liam O'Brien, Mason Walters kick (Drive: 1 play, 76 yards, 0:14; Penn 35–21)

Statistics	PENN	COLU
First downs	25	20
Total yards	458	366
Rushing yards	186	55
Passing yards	272	311
Turnovers	3	1
Time of possession	31:20	28:40

Team	Category	Player	Statistics
Penn	Passing	Liam O'Brien	17/26, 272 yards, 4 TD, 2 INT
Penn	Rushing	Liam O'Brien	15 carries, 81 yards, TD
Penn	Receiving	Jared Richardson	6 receptions, 157 yards, 3 TD
Columbia	Passing	Caleb Sanchez	27/47, 311 yards, 2 TD
Columbia	Rushing	Michael Walters	11 carries, 61 yards, TD
Columbia	Receiving	Titus Evans	7 receptions, 75 yards

=== at Dartmouth ===
Columbia Lions (1–4) at Dartmouth Big Green (4–1) – Game summary

Quarter	1	2	3	4	Total
Lions	0	0	0	3	3
Big Green	21	14	14	0	49

at Memorial Field, Hanover, NH

- Date: October 24
- Game time: 6:00 p.m. EDT
- Game weather: Sunny • Temperature: 50 °F (10 °C) • Wind: NW at 5 miles per hour (8.0 km/h)
- Game attendance: 3,471
- Referee: Alex Parrella
- TV announcers (ESPNU): Eric Frede (play-by-play) and Jack Ford (analyst)

Game information
First quarter
- (11:32) DART – Tyson Grimm 75-yard interception, Owen Zalc kick (Dartmouth 7–0)
- (6:51) DART – Grayson Saunier 24-yard run, Owen Zalc kick (Drive: 5 plays, 83 yards, 2:18; Dartmouth 14–0)
- (2:56) DART – No'Koi Maddox 19-yard punt return, Owen Zalc kick (Dartmouth 21–0)

Second quarter

- (5:45) DART – Grayson Saunier 13-yard run, Owen Zalc kick (Drive: 2 plays, 14 yards, 0:50; Dartmouth 28–0)
- (0:11) DART – Grayson Saunier 1-yard run, Owen Zalc kick (Drive: 10 plays, 75 yards, 3:58; Dartmouth 35–0)

Third quarter

- (12:19) DART – Chris Corbo 35-yard pass from Grayson Saunier, Owen Zalc kick (Drive: 6 plays, 75 yards, 2:41; Dartmouth 42–0)
- (0:06) DART – Desmin Jackson 2-yard run, Owen Zalc kick (Drive: 16 plays, 69 yards, 10:04; Dartmouth 49–0)

Fourth quarter

- (5:13) COLU – Hugo Merry 26-yard field goal (Drive: 17 plays, 72 yards, 8:05; Dartmouth 49–7)

Statistics	COLU	DART
First downs	17	18
Total yards	271	358
Rushing yards	156	192
Passing yards	115	166
Turnovers	2	0
Time of possession	31:03	28:57

Team	Category	Player	Statistics
Columbia	Passing	Caleb Sanchez	10/25, 105 yards, INT
Columbia	Rushing	Michael Walters	19 carries, 82 yards
Columbia	Receiving	Titus Evans	2 receptions, 32 yards
Dartmouth	Passing	Grayson Saunier	12/13, 162 yards, TD
Dartmouth	Rushing	D. J. Crowther	18 carries, 103 yards
Dartmouth	Receiving	Nick Lemon	3 receptions, 61 yards

=== at Yale ===
Columbia Lions (1–5) at Yale Bulldogs (4–2) – Game summary

Quarter	1	2	3	4	Total
Lions	0	7	0	3	10
Bulldogs	0	14	10	0	24

at Yale Bowl, New Haven, CT

- Date: November 1
- Game time: 12:00 p.m. EDT
- Game weather: Sunny • Temperature: 52 °F (11 °C) • Wind: NW at 12 miles per hour (19 km/h)
- Game attendance: 4,375
- Referee: Antonio Marcella
- TV announcers (ESPN+): Jim Cain (play-by-play) and Jack Siedlecki (analyst)

Game information

First quarter

No scoring plays

Second quarter

- (13:22) YALE – Jaxton Santiago 7-yard pass from Dante Reno, Noah Piper kick (Drive: 14 plays, 82 yards, 5:50; Yale 7-0)
- (4:52) YALE – Nico Brown 7-yard pass from Dante Reno, Noah Piper kick (Drive: 3 plays, 80 yards, 0:46; Yale 14-0)
- (0:13) COLU – Titus Evans 6-yard pass from Chase Goodwin, Hugo Merry kick (Drive: 9 plays, 52 yards, 1:23; Yale 14-7)

Third quarter

- (5:35) YALE – Noah Piper 40-yard field goal (Drive: 8 plays, 58 yards, 3:05; Yale 17-7)
- (3:43) YALE – Wilhelm Daal 81-yard run, Noah Piper kick (Drive: 1 play, 81 yards, 0:11; Yale 24-7)

Fourth quarter

- (7:08) COLU – Hugo Merry 29-yard field goal (Drive: 14 plays, 72 yards, 6:54; Yale 24-10)

Statistics	COLU	YALE
First downs	15	21
Total yards	270	432
Rushing yards	62	253
Passing yards	208	179
Turnovers	0	0
Time of possession	29:09	30:51

Team	Category	Player	Statistics
Columbia	Passing	Chase Goodwin	15/30, 208 yards, TD
Columbia	Rushing	Michael Walters	11 carries, 52 yards
Columbia	Receiving	Lucas Bullock	3 receptions, 78 yards
Yale	Passing	Dante Reno	16/25, 179 yards, 2 TD
Yale	Rushing	Josh Pitsenberger	25 carries, 132 yards
Yale	Receiving	Jaxton Santiago	5 receptions, 92 yards, TD

=== No. 9 Harvard ===
No. 9 Harvard Crimson (7–0) at Columbia Lions (1–6) – Game summary

Quarter	1	2	3	4	Total
No. 9 Crimson	7	21	3	0	31
Lions	0	0	0	14	14

at Wien Stadium, New York City, NY

- Date: November 7
- Game time: 7:00 PM EST
- Game weather: Cloudy • Temperature: 57 °F (14 °C) • Wind: S 14 mph
- Game attendance: 3,644
- Referee: Todd Bowman
- TV announcers (ESPNU): Eric Frede (play-by-play) and Jack Ford (analyst)

Game information
First quarter
- (2:11) HARV – Xaviah Bascon 1-yard run, Kieran Corr kick (Drive: 10 plays, 80 yards, 5:10; Harvard 7–0)

Second quarter

- (9:00) HARV – Seamus Gilmartin 2-yard pass from Jaden Craig, Kieran Corr kick (Drive: 1 play, 2 yards, 0:05; Harvard 14–0)
- (3:55) HARV – Seamus Gilmartin 3-yard pass from Jaden Craig, Kieran Corr kick (Drive: 6 plays, 68 yards, 2:45; Harvard 21–0)
- (0:11) HARV – Xaviah Bascon 1-yard run, Kieran Corr kick (Drive: 12 plays, 64 yards, 2:47; Harvard 28–0)

Third quarter

- (6:07) HARV – Kieran Corr 22-yard field goal (Drive: 11 plays, 61 yards, 4:34; Harvard 31–0)

Fourth quarter

- (13:19) COLU – Titus Evans 15-yard pass from Chase Goodwin (Drive: 14 plays, 75 yards, 7:48; Harvard 31–6)
- (1:49) COLU – Titus Evans 6-yard pass from Chase Goodwin, Titus Evans pass (Drive: 5 plays, 45 yards, 1:05; Harvard 31–14)

Statistics	HARV	COLU
First downs	16	18
Total yards	381	325
Rushing yards	168	105
Passing yards	213	220
Turnovers	1	2
Time of possession	25:45	34:15

Team	Category	Player	Statistics
Harvard	Passing	Jaden Craig	16/24, 213 yards, 2 TD
Harvard	Rushing	Xaviah Bascon	18 carries, 94 yards, 2 TD
Harvard	Receiving	Cam Henry	5 receptions, 68 yards
Columbia	Passing	Chase Goodwin	20/38, 205 yards, 2 TD, 2 INT
Columbia	Rushing	Michael Walters	12 carries, 47 yards
Columbia	Receiving	Jordan Kelley	3 receptions, 43 yards

=== Brown ===
Brown Bears (3–5) at Columbia Lions (1–7) – Game summary

Quarter	1	2	3	4	Total
Bears	8	7	3	14	32
Lions	0	7	8	14	29

at Wien Stadium, New York City, NY

- Date: November 15
- Game time: 12:00 p.m. EDT
- Game weather: Cloudy • Temperature: 46 °F (8 °C) • Wind: W at 6 miles per hour (9.7 km/h)
- Game attendance: 3,122
- Referee: Cory Hanson
- TV announcers (ESPN+): Lance Medow (play-by-play), Shawn FitzGerald and CJ Brown (analysts)

Game information

First quarter

- (2:42) BRWN – Ty Pezza 7-yard pass from James Murphy, Will Currid pass to Levi Linowes for two-point conversion (Drive: 8 plays, 66 yards, 3:12; Brown 8-0)

Second quarter

- (5:40) BRWN – Pearson Hill 18-yard pass from James Murphy, Drew Crabtree kick (Drive: 9 plays, 88 yards, 4:22; Brown 15-0)
- (4:03) COLU – Beckett Robinson 24-yard pass from Chase Goodwin, Hugo Merry kick (Drive: 4 plays, 51 yards, 1:32; Brown 15-7)

Third quarter

- (8:30) COLU – Titus Evans 2-yard pass from Chase Goodwin, Chase Goodwin pass to Beckett Robinson for two-point conversion (Drive: 11 plays, 65 yards, 5:41; 15-15)
- (2:46) BRWN – Drew Crabtree 23-yard field goal (Drive: 14 plays, 69 yards, 5:44; Brown 18-15)

Fourth quarter

- (13:33) COLU – Michael Walters 1-yard run, Hugo Merry kick (Drive: 9 plays, 75 yards, 4:13; Columbia 22-18)
- (11:28) BRWN – Matt Childs 10-yard pass from James Murphy, Drew Crabtree kick (Drive: 6 plays, 75 yards, 2:05; Brown 25-22)
- (4:07) COLU – Titus Evans 8-yard pass from Chase Goodwin, Hugo Merry kick (Drive: 3 plays, 28 yards, 1:26; Columbia 29-25)
- (1:53) BRWN – Matt Childs 5-yard pass from James Murphy, Drew Crabtree kick (Drive: 6 plays, 75 yards, 2:14; Brown 32-29)

Statistics	BRWN	COLU
First downs	23	21
Total yards	415	330
Rushing yards	75	162
Passing yards	340	168
Turnovers	0	3
Time of possession	27:51	32:09

Team	Category	Player	Statistics
Brown	Passing	James Murphy	31/43, 340 yards, 4 TD
Brown	Rushing	Matt Childs	10 carries, 50 yards
Brown	Receiving	Trevor Foley	6 receptions, 140 yards
Columbia	Passing	Chase Goodwin	17/25, 168 yards, 3 TD, INT
Columbia	Rushing	Michael Walters	27 carries, 123 yards
Columbia	Receiving	Beckett Robinson	6 receptions, 97 yards, TD

=== at Cornell (rivalry) ===
Columbia Lions (1–7) at Cornell Big Red (4–5) – Game summary

Quarter	1	2	3	4	Total
Lions	7	15	0	7	29
Big Red	3	6	0	3	12

at Schoellkopf Field, Ithaca, NY

- Date: November 22
- Game time: 1:00 p.m. EDT
- Game weather: Sunny • Temperature: 42 °F (6 °C) • Wind: SW 9 mph
- Game attendance: 3,212
- Referee: Mark Queen
- TV announcers (ESPN+): Nick De Luca (play-by-play) and Matt Miller (analyst)

Game information
First quarter
- (3:27) COLU – Michael Walters 1-yard run, Hugo Merry kick (Drive: 8 plays, 80 yards, 3:41; Columbia 7-0)
- (0:30) COR – Caden Lesiewicz 32-yard field goal (Drive: 8 plays, 60 yards, 2:57; Columbia 7-3)

Second quarter

- (15:00) COLU – Braden Dougherty 13-yard pass from Chase Goodwin, Hugo Merry kick (Drive: 6 plays, 75 yards, 2:13; Columbia 14-3)
- (1:57) COR – Jordan Triplett 1-yard run, Caden Lesiewicz PAT failed (Drive: 7 plays, 75 yards, 2:46; Columbia 14-9)
- (0:04) COLU – AJ Simpkins 1-yard run, Chase Goodwin pass to Titus Evans for two-point conversion (Drive: 12 plays, 63 yards, 1:52; Columbia 22-9)

Third quarter

- No scoring plays

Fourth quarter

- (14:55) COR – Caden Lesiewicz 37-yard field goal (Drive: 15 plays, 57 yards, 6:29; Columbia 22-12)
- (5:42) COLU – Griffin Johnson 14-yard run, Hugo Merry kick (Drive: 6 plays, 37 yards, 4:04; Columbia 29-12)

Statistics	COLU	COR
First downs	25	19
Total yards	423	313
Rushing yards	253	88
Passing yards	170	225
Turnovers	2	2
Time of possession	34:36	25:24

Team	Category	Player	Statistics
Columbia	Passing	Chase Goodwin	12/26, 170 yards, TD, 2 INT
Columbia	Rushing	Griffin Johnson	29 carries, 203 yards, TD
Columbia	Receiving	Beckett Robinson	5 receptions, 66 yards
Cornell	Passing	Garrett Bass-Sulpizio	19/34, 225 yards, INT
Cornell	Rushing	Jordan Triplett	11 carries, 67 yards, TD
Cornell	Receiving	Brendan Lee	6 receptions, 78 yards
