= 2025 Brown Bears football team =

American college football season

2025 Brown Bears football
- Conference: Ivy League
- Record: 5−5 (2–5 Ivy)
- Head coach: James Perry (6th season)
- Offensive scheme: Air raid
- Defensive coordinator: Dan Mulrooney (1st season)
- Base defense: 4–3
- Home stadium: Richard Gouse Field at Brown Stadium

2025 Ivy League football standings
	Conf.			Overall
Team	W		L	W		L
No. 15 Yale +^	6	–	1	9	–	3
No. 20 Harvard +^	6	–	1	9	–	2
Dartmouth	4	–	3	7	–	3
Penn	4	–	3	6	–	4
Cornell	3	–	4	4	–	6
Princeton	2	–	5	3	–	7
Brown	2	–	5	5	–	5
Columbia	1	–	6	2	–	8
+ – Conference co-champions; ^ – FCS playoff participant; Rankings from STATS Poll

The 2025 Brown Bears football team represented Brown University as a member of the Ivy League during the 2025 NCAA Division I FCS football season. The Bears were led by sixth-year head coach James Perry and played their home games at Richard Gouse Field at Brown Stadium in Providence, Rhode Island.

== Preseason ==
=== Preseason poll ===
On August 4, Ivy League announced the preseason poll. Bears were selected to finish in the last position.

== Schedule ==
The Brown Bears' 2025 football schedule consists of five away and five home games. Brown will host Ivy League opponents Princeton, Yale, and Dartmouth, and will travel to Harvard, Cornell, Penn, and Columbia. Brown's non-conference opponents will be Georgetown of the Patriot League, Bryant of the Coastal Athletic Association Football Conference, and rival Rhode Island, also of the Coastal Athletic Association Football Conference.

Date	Time	Opponent	Site	TV	Result	Attendance
September 20	12:00 p.m.	Georgetown*	Brown Stadium; Providence, RI	ESPN+	W 46–0	3,349
September 27	6:00 p.m.	at Harvard	Harvard Stadium; Boston, MA	ESPN+	L 7–41	16,283
October 3	7:00 p.m.	No. 8 Rhode Island*	Centreville Bank Stadium; Pawtucket, RI (rivalry)	ESPN+	W 28–21	5,047
October 10	7:00 p.m.	at Bryant*	Beirne Stadium; Smithfield, RI	FloFootball	W 29–19	1,800
October 18	12:00 p.m.	Princeton	Brown Stadium; Providence, RI	ESPN+	L 21–40	4,304
October 25	1:00 p.m.	at Cornell	Schoellkopf Field; Ithaca, NY	ESPN+	L 24–30 ^{2OT}	3,242
October 31	7:00 p.m.	at Penn	Franklin Field; Philadelphia, PA	ESPNU	L 21–28	1,458
November 8	12:00 p.m.	Yale	Brown Stadium; Providence, RI	NESN/ESPN+	L 22–34	3,009
November 15	12:00 p.m.	at Columbia	Wien Stadium; New York, NY	ESPN+	W 32–29	3,122
November 22	12:00 p.m.	Dartmouth	Brown Stadium; Providence, RI	NESN/ESPN+	W 35–28	1,463
*Non-conference game; Rankings from STATS Poll released prior to the game; All times are in Eastern time

== Game summaries ==
=== Georgetown ===
Georgetown Hoyas (2–1) at Brown Bears (0–0) – Game summary

Quarter	1	2	3	4	Total
Hoyas	0	0	0	0	0
Bears	14	18	7	7	46

at Brown Stadium, Providence, Rhode Island

- Date: September 20
- Game time: 1:00 p.m. EDT
- Game weather: Sunny, 69 °F (21 °C)
- Game attendance: 3,349
- Referee: Anthony Florio
- TV announcers (ESPN+): Scott Cordischi (play-by-play), Nick Coit (analyst) and Cam Manna (sideline)
- Box score, Recap

Game information
First quarter
- BRWN – Qwentin Brown 1-yard run (Drew Crabtree kick), 11:51. Bears 7–0. Drive: 8 plays, 75 yards, 3:09.
- BRWN – Jackson Bennett 9-yard run (Drew Crabtree kick), 1:22. Bears 14–0. Drive: 6 plays, 44 yards, 2:06.

Second quarter

- BRWN – Drew Crabtree 24-yard field goal, 7:12. Bears 17–0. Drive: 7 plays, 56 yards, 2:47.
- BRWN – Matt Childs 4-yard pass from James Murphy (Drew Crabtree kick), 6:20. Bears 24–0. Drive: 3 plays, 6 yards, 0:41.
- BRWN – Qwentin Brown 49-yard run (James Murphy pass to Ty Pezza), 3:06. Bears 32–0. Drive: 3 plays, 65 yards, 1:18.

Third quarter

- BRWN – Levi Linowes 42-yard pass from James Murphy (Drew Crabtree kick), 3:05. Bears 39–0. Drive: 5 plays, 80 yards, 2:26.

Fourth quarter

- BRWN – Eli Jones 1-yard run (Drew Crabtree kick), 11:24. Bears 46–0. Drive: 6 plays, 21 yards, 3:36.

Statistics	GTWN	BRWN
First downs	11	18
Total yards	183	387
Rushing yards	76	168
Passing yards	107	219
Turnovers	4	1
Time of possession	29:27	30:33

Team	Category	Player	Statistics
Georgetown	Passing	Dez Thomas II	7/24, 94 yards, 2 INT
Georgetown	Rushing	Savion Hart	10 rushes, 42 yards
Georgetown	Receiving	Jimmy Kibble	3 receptions, 82 yards
Brown	Passing	James Murphy	20/28, 219 yards, 2 TD, INT
Brown	Rushing	Qwentin Brown	9 rushes, 69 yards, 2 TD
Brown	Receiving	Levi Linowes	2 receptions, 56 yards, TD

=== at Harvard ===
Brown Bears (1–0) at Harvard Crimson (1–0) – Game summary

Quarter	1	2	3	4	Total
Bears	7	0	0	0	7
Crimson	21	13	7	0	41

at Harvard Stadium, Boston, Massachusetts

- Date: September 27
- Game time: 6:00 p.m. EDT
- Game weather: Cloudy, 74 °F (23 °C)
- Game attendance: 16,283
- Referee: Bill McKeever
- TV announcers (ESPN+): Alex Vispoli (play-by-play), Tim Murphy (analyst) and Amanda Keane (sideline)
- Box score, Recap

Game information
First quarter
- HARV – Dorsey Benefield 30-yard interception return (Kieran Corr kick), 14:52. Crimson 7–0.
- HARV – Dean Boyd 21-yard pass from Jaden Craig (Kieran Corr kick), 8:13. Crimson 14–0. Drive: 3 plays, 20 yards, 0:48.
- BRWN – Ty Pezza 4-yard pass from James Murphy (Drew Crabtree kick), 5:06. Crimson 14–7. Drive: 8 plays, 75 yards, 3:07.
- HARV – D. J. Gordon 1-yard run (Kieran Corr kick), 0:00. Crimson 21–7. Drive: 9 plays, 80 yards, 5:01.

Second quarter

- HARV – Seamus Gilmartin 16-yard pass from Jaden Craig (Kieran Corr kick), 5:47. Crimson 28–7. Drive: 13 plays, 90 yards, 7:12.
- HARV – Cam Henry 44-yard pass from Jaden Craig (kick failed), 1:51. Crimson 34–7. Drive: 5 plays, 73 yards, 2:29.

Third quarter

- HARV – Ryan Osborne 1-yard pass from Jaden Craig (Kieran Corr kick), 10:11. Crimson 41–7. Drive: 5 plays, 42 yards, 2:46.

Fourth quarter

- No scoring plays

Statistics	BRWN	HARV
First downs	12	23
Total yards	155	479
Rushing yards	56	162
Passing yards	99	317
Turnovers	3	0
Time of possession	20:53	39:07

Team	Category	Player	Statistics
Brown	Passing	James Murphy	14/26, 99 yards, TD, 3 INT
Brown	Rushing	Matt Childs	12 rushes, 30 yards
Brown	Receiving	Michael Nesbit	2 receptions, 35 yards
Harvard	Passing	Jaden Craig	24/31, 317 yards, 4 TD
Harvard	Rushing	D. J. Gordon	16 rushes, 73 yards, TD
Harvard	Receiving	Cam Henry	3 receptions, 81 yards, TD

=== No. 8 Rhode Island (rivalry) ===
No. 8 Rhode Island Rams (4–1) at Brown Bears (1–1) – Game summary

Quarter	1	2	3	4	Total
No. 8 Rams	7	7	0	7	21
Bears	14	7	7	0	28

at Brown Stadium, Providence, RI

- Date: October 3
- Game time: 7:00 p.m. EDT
- Game weather: Sunny, 70 °F (21 °C)
- Game attendance: 5,047
- Referee: Justin Ackley
- TV announcers (ESPN+): Scott Cordischi (play-by-play), John Anderson (analyst) and Nick Coit (sideline)
- Box score, Recap

Game information

First quarter

- (13:11) BRWN – Matt Childs 6-yard run, Drew Crabtree kick (Drive: 2 plays, 10 yards, 0:30; Brown 7–0)
- (9:26) URI – Marquis Buchanan 6-yard pass from Devin Farrell, Garth White kick (Drive: 8 plays, 59 yards, 3:37; Tied 7–7)
- (2:15) BRWN – Ty Pezza 18-yard pass from James Murphy, Drew Crabtree kick (Drive: 15 plays, 75 yards, 7:11; Brown 14–7)

Second quarter

- (9:25) URI – Omari Walker 30-yard pass from Devin Farrell, Garth White kick (Drive: 7 plays, 74 yards, 3:45; Tied 14–14)
- (5:41) BRWN – Matt Childs 3-yard run, Drew Crabtree kick (Drive: 9 plays, 75 yards, 3:44; Brown 21–14)

Third quarter

- (4:36) BRWN – Solomon Miller 8-yard pass from James Murphy, Drew Crabtree kick (Drive: 16 plays, 80 yards, 7:11; Brown 28–14)

Fourth quarter

- (4:11) URI – Matt Smith 2-yard pass from Devin Farrell, Garth White kick (Drive: 10 plays, 80 yards, 3:57; Brown 28–21)

Statistics	URI	BRWN
First downs	23	22
Plays–yards	67–452	72–341
Rushes–yards	23–99	45–140
Passing yards	353	201
Passing: Comp–Att–Int	30–44–2	20–27–0
Turnovers	4	0
Time of possession	27:11	32:49

Team	Category	Player	Statistics
Rhode Island	Passing	Devin Farrell	30/44, 353 yards, 3 TD, 2 INT
Rhode Island	Rushing	Antwain Littleton Jr.	15 carries, 60 yards
Rhode Island	Receiving	Greg Gaines	5 receptions, 87 yards
Brown	Passing	James Murphy	20/27, 201 yards, 2 TD
Brown	Rushing	Matt Childs	22 carries, 64 yards, 2 TD
Brown	Receiving	Ty Pezza	6 receptions, 93 yards, TD

=== at Bryant ===
Brown Bears (2–1) at Bryant Bulldogs (2–4) – Game summary

Quarter	1	2	3	4	Total
Bears	0	0	15	14	29
Bulldogs	6	6	7	0	19

at Beirne Stadium, Smithfield, RI

- Date: October 10
- Game time: 7:00 p.m. EDT
- Game weather: Sunny
- Game attendance: 1,800
- Referee: Eric Lewis
- TV announcers (FloFootball): Thomas Zinzarella (play-by-play) and Tim Lynch (analyst)
- Box score, Recap

Game information
First quarter
- (1:03) BRY – Elijah Elliott 14-yard run (Drive: 7 plays, 63 yards, 3:04; Bryant 6–0)

Second quarter

- (1:54) BRY – Elijah Elliott 1-yard run (Drive: 12 plays, 93 yards, 7:11; Bryant 12–0)

Third quarter

- (12:20) BRWN – Trevor Foley 47-yard pass from James Murphy, Drew Crabtree kick (Drive: 5 plays, 72 yards, 1:12; Bryant 12–7)
- (6:12) BRWN – Matt Childs 1-yard run, Levi Linowes pass (Drive: 11 plays, 71 yards, 4:04; Brown 15–12)
- (2:22) BRY – Aldrich Doe 16-yard pass from Jaden Keefner, Nicholas Stoyanovich kick (Drive: 7 plays, 65 yards, 3:45; Bryant 19–15)

Fourth quarter

- (8:59) BRWN – Matt Childs 1-yard run, Drew Crabtree kick (Drive: 6 plays, 79 yards, 1:59; Brown 22–19)
- (4:21) BRWN – Qwentin Brown 26-yard run, Drew Crabtree kick (Drive: 7 plays, 69 yards, 3:40; Brown 29–19)

Statistics	BRWN	BRY
First downs	27	22
Total yards	460	350
Rushing yards	113	188
Passing yards	347	162
Turnovers	1	2
Time of possession	30:00	30:00

Team	Category	Player	Statistics
Brown	Passing	James Murphy	29/44, 347 yards, TD, INT
Brown	Rushing	Matt Childs	21 carries, 92 yards, 2 TD
Brown	Receiving	Solomon Miller	5 receptions, 56 yards
Bryant	Passing	Jaden Keefner	16/27, 162 yards, TD, INT
Bryant	Rushing	Elijah Elliott	21 carries, 116 yards, 2 TD
Bryant	Receiving	Zyheem Collick	7 receptions, 57 yards

=== Princeton ===
Princeton Tigers (2–2) at Brown Bears (3–1) – Game summary

Quarter	1	2	3	4	Total
Tigers	10	10	13	7	40
Bears	7	7	0	7	21

at Brown Stadium, Providence, RI

- Date: October 18
- Game time: 12:00 p.m. EDT
- Game weather: Sunny, 62 °F (17 °C)
- Game attendance: 4,304
- Referee: Tom Zetts
- TV announcers (ESPN+): Scott Cordischi (play-by-play), John Anderson (analyst) and Nick Coit (sideline)
- Box score, Recap

Game information
First quarter
- (9:53) PRIN – Jackson Green 3-yard pass from Kai Colón, Esteban Nunez Perez kick (Drive: 15 plays, 85 yards, 5:03; Princeton 7–0)
- (7:00) BRWN – Matt Childs 27-yard run, Drew Crabtree kick (Drive: 1 play, 27 yards, 0:07; Tied 7–7)
- (2:48) PRIN – Esteban Nunez Perez 37-yard field goal (Drive: 4 plays, 1 yard, 1:21; Princeton 10–7)

Second quarter

- (11:27) BRWN – Qwentin Brown 1-yard run, Drew Crabtree kick (Drive: 14 plays, 75 yards, 6:21; Brown 14–10)
- (6:31) PRIN – Josh Robinson 20-yard pass from Kai Colón, Esteban Nunez Perez kick (Drive: 5 plays, 37 yards, 1:36; Princeton 17–14)
- (0:15) PRIN – Esteban Nunez Perez 29-yard field goal (Drive: 7 plays, 46 yards, 2:15; Princeton 20–14)

Third quarter

- (7:30) PRIN – Asher Weiner 1-yard run (Drive: 8 plays, 44 yards, 3:39; Princeton 26–14)
- (1:23) PRIN – Ethan Clark 12-yard run, Esteban Nunez Perez kick (Drive: 8 plays, 86 yards, 3:54; Princeton 33–14)

Fourth quarter

- (13:11) BRWN – Matt Childs 1-yard run, Drew Crabtree kick (Drive: 10 plays, 80 yards, 3:06; Princeton 33–21)
- (9:14) PRIN – Kai Honda 2-yard run, Esteban Nunez Perez kick (Drive: 2 plays, 21 yards, 0:46; Princeton 40–21)

Statistics	PRIN	BRWN
First downs	22	24
Total yards	412	370
Rushing yards	195	163
Passing yards	217	207
Turnovers	2	4
Time of possession	29:35	30:25

Team	Category	Player	Statistics
Princeton	Passing	Kai Colón	19/29, 212 yards, 2 TD, INT
Princeton	Rushing	Ethan Clark	17 carries, 120 yards, TD
Princeton	Receiving	Josh Robinson	8 receptions, 91 yards, TD
Brown	Passing	James Murphy	22/35, 173 yards, 3 INT
Brown	Rushing	Matt Childs	14 carries, 94 yards, 2 TD
Brown	Receiving	Michael Nesbit	3 receptions, 31 yards

=== at Cornell ===
Brown Bears (3–2) at Cornell Big Red (1–4) – Game summary

Quarter	1	2	3	4	OT	2OT	Total
Bears	7	3	0	7	7	0	24
Big Red	6	0	0	11	7	6	30

at Schoellkopf Field, Ithaca, NY

- Date: October 25
- Game time: 1:00 p.m. EDT
- Game weather: Cloudy • Temperature: 50 °F (10 °C) • Wind: NE at 4 miles per hour (6.4 km/h)
- Game attendance: 3,242
- Referee: Todd Boyd
- TV announcers (ESPN+): Nick DeLuca (play-by-play) and Matt Miller (analyst)
- Box score, Recap

Game information
First quarter
- (5:42) COR – Jordan Triplett 5-yard run (Drive: 8 plays, 75 yards, 2:17; Cornell 6–0)
- (2:15) BRWN – Ty Pezza 10-yard pass from James Murphy, Drew Crabtree kick (Drive: 7 plays, 75 yards, 3:27; Brown 7–6)

Second quarter

- (7:21) BRWN – Drew Crabtree 38-yard field goal (Drive: 7 plays, 60 yards, 2:41; Brown 10–6)

Third quarter

- No scoring plays

Fourth quarter

- (14:55) BRWN – Qwentin Brown 1-yard run, Drew Crabtree kick (Drive: 15 plays, 90 yards, 3:46; Brown 17–6)
- (3:44) COR – Garrett Bass-Sulpizio 10-yard run, John McAuliffe pass (Drive: 8 plays, 69 yards, 1:34; Brown 17–14)
- (0:46) COR – Jonathan Roost 25-yard field goal (Drive: 9 plays, 66 yards, 0:58; Tied 17–17)

Overtime

- BRWN – Ty Pezza 25-yard pass from James Murphy, Drew Crabtree kick (Drive: 2 plays, 25 yards, 0:00; Brown 24–17)
- COR – Jordan Triplett 2-yard run, Jonathan Roost kick (Drive: 4 plays, 25 yards, 0:00; Tied 24–24)

Double overtime

- COR – Jordan Triplett 1-yard run (Drive: 6 plays, 25 yards, 0:00; Cornell 30–24)

Statistics	BRWN	COR
First downs	20	31
Total yards	503	503
Rushing yards	32	157
Passing yards	471	346
Turnovers	1	0
Time of possession	27:42	32:18

Team	Category	Player	Statistics
Brown	Passing	James Murphy	31/49, 471 yards, 2 TD, INT
Brown	Rushing	Matt Childs	11 carries, 22 yards
Brown	Receiving	Ty Pezza	9 receptions, 172 yards, 2 TD
Cornell	Passing	Garrett Bass-Sulpizio	28/48, 346 yards
Cornell	Rushing	Garrett Bass-Sulpizio	19 carries, 70 yards, TD
Cornell	Receiving	Ryan Matulevich	6 receptions, 100 yards

=== at Penn ===
Brown Bears (3–3) at Penn Quakers (4–2) – Game summary

Quarter	1	2	3	4	Total
Bears	7	0	7	7	21
Quakers	7	14	7	0	28

at Franklin Field, Philadelphia, PA

- Date: October 31
- Game time: 7:00 p.m. EDT
- Game weather: Cloudy • Temperature: 52 °F (11 °C) • Wind: W at 15 miles per hour (24 km/h)
- Game attendance: 1,458
- Referee: Anthony Florio
- TV announcers (ESPNU): Eric Frede (play-by-play) and Jack Ford (analyst)
- Box score, Recap

Game information
First quarter
- (6:45) PENN – Donte West 1-yard run, Mason Walters kick (Drive: 11 plays, 58 yards, 4:51; Penn 7–0)
- (4:26) BRWN – Ty Pezza 44-yard pass from James Murphy, Drew Crabtree kick (Drive: 6 plays, 75 yards, 2:19; Tied 7–7)

Second quarter

- (14:10) PENN – Bisi Owens 9-yard pass from Liam O'Brien, Mason Walters kick (Drive: 10 plays, 70 yards, 5:08; Penn 14–7)
- (7:20) PENN – Sean Williams Jr. 1-yard run, Mason Walters kick (Drive: 8 plays, 74 yards, 3:35; Penn 21–7)

Third quarter

- (7:12) BRWN – Pearson Hill 4-yard pass from Najih Rahman, Drew Crabtree kick (Drive: 12 plays, 66 yards, 4:53; Penn 21–14)
- (4:56) PENN – Donte West 1-yard run, Mason Walters kick (Drive: 4 plays, 45 yards, 2:02; Penn 28–14)

Fourth quarter

- (4:19) BRWN – Trevor Foley 14-yard pass from James Murphy, Drew Crabtree kick (Drive: 10 plays, 76 yards, 3:47; Penn 28–21)

Statistics	BRWN	PENN
First downs	21	22
Total yards	397	453
Rushing yards	33	231
Passing yards	364	222
Turnovers	1	1
Time of possession	29:04	30:56

Team	Category	Player	Statistics
Brown	Passing	James Murphy	31/44, 360 yards, 2 TD, INT
Brown	Rushing	Matt Childs	9 carries, 26 yards
Brown	Receiving	Trevor Foley	5 receptions, 99 yards, TD
Penn	Passing	Liam O'Brien	18/27, 222 yards, TD, INT
Penn	Rushing	Sean Williams Jr.	13 carries, 89 yards, TD
Penn	Receiving	Jared Richardson	6 receptions, 104 yards

=== Yale ===
Yale Bulldogs (5–2) at Brown Bears (3–4) – Game summary

Quarter	1	2	Total
Bulldogs			0
Bears			0

at Brown Stadium, Providence, RI

- Date: November 8
- Game time: 12:00 p.m. EDT
- TV: ESPN+

Game information
First quarter

Second quarter Third quarter Fourth quarter

Statistics	YALE	BRWN
First downs		
Total yards		
Rushing yards		
Passing yards		
Turnovers		
Time of possession		

Team	Category	Player	Statistics
Yale	Passing		
Yale	Rushing		
Yale	Receiving		
Brown	Passing		
Brown	Rushing		
Brown	Receiving		

=== at Columbia ===
Brown Bears (3–5) at Columbia Lions (1–7) – Game summary

Quarter	1	2	3	4	Total
Bears	8	7	3	14	32
Lions	0	7	8	14	29

at Wien Stadium, New York City, NY

- Date: November 15
- Game time: 12:00 p.m. EDT
- Game weather: Cloudy • Temperature: 46 °F (8 °C) • Wind: W at 6 miles per hour (9.7 km/h)
- Game attendance: 3,122
- Referee: Cory Hanson
- TV announcers (ESPN+): Lance Medow (play-by-play), Shawn FitzGerald and CJ Brown (analysts)

Game information
First quarter
- (2:42) BRWN – Ty Pezza 7-yard pass from James Murphy, Will Currid pass to Levi Linowes for two-point conversion (Drive: 8 plays, 66 yards, 3:12; Brown 8-0)

Second quarter

- (5:40) BRWN – Pearson Hill 18-yard pass from James Murphy, Drew Crabtree kick (Drive: 9 plays, 88 yards, 4:22; Brown 15-0)
- (4:03) COLU – Beckett Robinson 24-yard pass from Chase Goodwin, Hugo Merry kick (Drive: 4 plays, 51 yards, 1:32; Brown 15-7)

Third quarter

- (8:30) COLU – Titus Evans 2-yard pass from Chase Goodwin, Chase Goodwin pass to Beckett Robinson for two-point conversion (Drive: 11 plays, 65 yards, 5:41; 15-15)
- (2:46) BRWN – Drew Crabtree 23-yard field goal (Drive: 14 plays, 69 yards, 5:44; Brown 18-15)

Fourth quarter

- (13:33) COLU – Michael Walters 1-yard run, Hugo Merry kick (Drive: 9 plays, 75 yards, 4:13; Columbia 22-18)
- (11:28) BRWN – Matt Childs 10-yard pass from James Murphy, Drew Crabtree kick (Drive: 6 plays, 75 yards, 2:05; Brown 25-22)
- (4:07) COLU – Titus Evans 8-yard pass from Chase Goodwin, Hugo Merry kick (Drive: 3 plays, 28 yards, 1:26; Columbia 29-25)
- (1:53) BRWN – Matt Childs 5-yard pass from James Murphy, Drew Crabtree kick (Drive: 6 plays, 75 yards, 2:14; Brown 32-29)

Statistics	BRWN	COLU
First downs	23	21
Total yards	415	330
Rushing yards	75	162
Passing yards	340	168
Turnovers	0	3
Time of possession	27:51	32:09

Team	Category	Player	Statistics
Brown	Passing	James Murphy	31/43, 340 yards, 4 TD
Brown	Rushing	Matt Childs	10 carries, 50 yards
Brown	Receiving	Trevor Foley	6 receptions, 140 yards
Columbia	Passing	Chase Goodwin	17/25, 168 yards, 3 TD, INT
Columbia	Rushing	Michael Walters	27 carries, 123 yards
Columbia	Receiving	Beckett Robinson	6 receptions, 97 yards, TD

=== Dartmouth ===
Dartmouth Big Green (7–2) at Brown Bears (4–5) – Game summary

Quarter	1	2	Total
Big Green			0
Bears			0

at Brown Stadium, Providence, RI

- Date: November 22
- Game time: 12:00 p.m. EDT
- TV announcers (ESPN+): Scott Cordischi (play-by-play) and John Anderson (analyst)

Game information
First quarter

Second quarter Third quarter Fourth quarter

Statistics	DART	BRWN
First downs		
Total yards		
Rushing yards		
Passing yards		
Turnovers		
Time of possession		

Team	Category	Player	Statistics
Dartmouth	Passing		
Dartmouth	Rushing		
Dartmouth	Receiving		
Brown	Passing		
Brown	Rushing		
Brown	Receiving		
