= Chris Corbo =

American football player (born 2004)

No. 17 – Georgia Tech Yellow Jackets
- Position: Tight end
- Class: Redshirt Senior

Personal information
- Born: July 11, 2004 (age 22); Livingston, New Jersey, U.S.
- Listed height: 6 ft 5 in (1.96 m)
- Listed weight: 250 lb (113 kg)

Career information
- High school: West Essex (North Caldwell, New Jersey)
- College: Dartmouth (2022–2025); Georgia Tech (2026–present)

Awards and highlights
- First-team FCS All-American (2025)
- Stats at ESPN

Christopher M. Corbo (born July 11, 2004) is an American college football tight end for the Georgia Tech Yellow Jackets. He previously played for the Dartmouth Big Green.

== Early life ==
Corbo was born on July 11, 2004 in Livingston, New Jersey. He was introduced to football when he began playing flag football at the age of four. Corbo attended West Essex High School, where he was a standout football and basketball player. During his senior season, he had 32 receptions for 452 yards and five touchdowns as well as 112 tackles and four interceptions on defense. On February 8, 2022, Corbo signed to play college football at Dartmouth.

== College career ==
=== Dartmouth ===
During his freshman year, Corbo did not appear in any games, however he was recognized as the recipient of Dartmouth's Scout Team Award on offense. During his sophomore season, he played in every game for the Big Green and caught nine passes for 81 yards and two touchdown as well as rushing for 26 yards on a single carry. As a junior, Corbo's hauled in 32 catches for 315 yard and a team leading seven touchdowns. His performance led to him being named first team All-Ivy League and being recognized as a first team All-American by the AFCA and Walter Camp Football Foundation. He also received Dartmouth's Jake Crouthamel Award for being the offensive underclassman who has contributed most to the success of the team. Prior to the 2025 season, Corbo was named to the East-West Shrine Bowl 1000. In 2025, Corbo had 45 catches for 516 yards and four touchdowns. Corbo was again named first team All-Ivy League and All-New England Team. He was also named to the AP, AFCA, WCFF, Sports Illustrated, STATS Perform, and Phil Steele All-America teams as a first team selection.

On November 24, 2025, Corbo entered the transfer portal.

=== Georgia Tech ===
On January 5, 2026, Corbo committed to transfer to Georgia Tech.

== Personal life ==
Corbo is the son of Michael and Suzanne Corbo. He has one brother, Michael. His father was a two-time all-conference defensive lineman and team captain at Franklin & Marshall in the mid-’80s and grandfather Michael played at both Penn and Colgate.
