= Eric Frede =

American sportscaster

Eric Frede is an American sportscaster who has worked for NESN since 2002. He was previously the play-by-play announcer for NESN College Football Saturday broadcasts until he left NESN and joined NBC Sports Boston and is currently an anchor for the SportsNet Central.

Frede began his broadcasting career in New York, covering West Point sports, calling Marist College basketball games on the radio, and working as a production assistant at NBC Sports. From there, he worked at WVII-TV in Bangor, Maine and WMUR-TV in Manchester, New Hampshire. He arrived in Boston in 1998 and was a host on the Boston Celtics pre-game, post-game and magazine shows on Fox Sports New England. He also called games for the Boston Breakers, New England Revolution and America East basketball telecasts. Frede has also called sports nationally for Oxygen (WUSA and women's college basketball), SPEED and CSTV (college hockey).

Frede joined NESN in December 2002 as a SportsDesk presenter. He has also provided play-by-play for the New England Revolution, as well as hosting Inside Hockey East, a half-hour show during college hockey on NESN. He was also the Celtics PA announcer during part of the 2002-03 NBA season. He was the field reporter for the Boston Red Sox from 2004 to 2005. Frede has filled in for Tom Caron on the pre-game and post-game reports. He has also presented NESN SportsDesk, hosted Red Sox Rewind and filled in for Bob Lobel on Boston Globe: SportsPlus. He was the Boston Bruins studio host, from 2005 to 2007. Frede is a 1988 graduate of Ithaca College in Ithaca, NY. In 2007, Frede did play-by-play for the Ice Hockey World Championships for the World Championship Sports Network. He currently calls minor league baseball games for NESN. On June 11, 2010, and again two days later, he pinch-hit in the Fenway Park broadcast booth for an ailing Don Orsillo, Red Sox play-by-play voice on NESN, for a game against the Philadelphia Phillies, he left NESN and joined CSN New England and is currently an Anchor for the SportsNet Central program on that network.

Frede received the Edward R. Murrow Award for Sports Reporting.

People he has worked with on Red Sox pre- and post-game coverage include Jim Rice, Dennis Eckersley, Tom Caron, Jerry Remy, Gary DiSarcina and Sam Horn.

People he has worked with on Bruins pre- and post-game coverage include Cam Neely, Rick Middleton, Don Sweeney, Gord Kluzak, Barry Pederson, Paul Stewart.

On February 21, Frede was reporting sports for Fox 25 news.

Frede can be heard every Monday morning on the New Hampshire-based radio show Greg and the Morning Buzz.

Preceded by Greg Dickerson	Boston Celtics Public Address Announcer; 2002–2003	Succeeded by Eddie Palladino
