= 2024 NCAA Division III baseball tournament =

College baseball tournament

- Season: 2024
- Teams: 60
- Finals site: Classic Park; Eastlake, Ohio
- Champions: Misericordia (1st title)
- Runner-up: Wisconsin-Whitewater
- Winning coach: Pete Egbert (1st title)

The 2024 NCAA Division III baseball tournament was the 48th edition of the NCAA Division III baseball tournament. The 60-team tournament began on Friday, May 17 and concluded with the 2024 Division III College World Series at Classic Park in Eastlake, Ohio, which started on May 31 and will end on June 6. It is the first Division III baseball tournament held in Ohio since 1987.

60 NCAA Division III college baseball teams were selected, with 41 earning automatic bids as conference champions and 19 earning at-large bids awarded by the NCAA Division III Baseball Committee. Teams were divided into fourteen regionals of four teams, each of which conducted a double-elimination tournament, and two regionals of two teams, each of which conducted a best-of-five series. Regional champions then faced each other in Super Regionals, a best-of-three-game series, determined the eight participants in the championship.

In March 2024, Birmingham–Southern College announced that it would be closing on May 31 due to financial troubles. Its baseball team earned an at-large bid and raised $100,000 through a GoFundMe to compete, drawing national attention. The team won the Granville Super Regional and played its first game in the championship bracket on May 31, the day the university closed.

Misericordia won the national championship for the first time, defeating Wisconsin-Whitewater two games to one.

== Schedule and venues ==
On May 16, the NCAA Division III Baseball Committee announced the sixteen regional host sites.

Regionals

- May 17–19
  - Penn State Harrisburg Baseball Field, Harrisburg, Pennsylvania (Host: Penn State Harrisburg)
  - Prucha Field at James B. Miller Stadium, Whitewater, Wisconsin (Host: University of Wisconsin–Whitewater)
  - Copeland Park, La Crosse, Wisconsin (Host: University of Wisconsin–La Crosse)
  - Big Red Baseball Field, Granville, Ohio (Host: Denison University)
  - Legends Field, Lexington, Kentucky (Host: Transylvania University)
  - Nobby's Ballpark, Cleveland, Ohio (Host: Case Western Reserve University)
  - Woods Field, Marshall, Texas (Host: East Texas Baptist University)
  - Govoni Field, Wellesley, Massachusetts, (Host: Babson College)
  - Robert H. Wallace '53 Field, Cortland, New York (Host: State University of New York at Cortland)
  - Captains Park, Newport News, Virginia (Host: Christopher Newport University)
  - Tambur Field, Dallas, Pennsylvania (Host: Misericordia University)
  - Babb Field at Stromberg Stadium, Baltimore, Maryland (Host: Johns Hopkins University)
  - Eastern Baseball Stadium, Willimantic, Connecticut (Host: Eastern Connecticut State University)
  - Fisher Field, Berea, Ohio (Host: Baldwin Wallace University)
  - Trinity Baseball Field, San Antonio, Texas (Host: Trinity University)
  - Alumni Field, Claremont, California (Host: Pomona-Pitzer Colleges)

Super Regionals

- May 24–25
  - Prucha Field at James B. Miller Stadium, Whitewater, Wisconsin (Host: University of Wisconsin–Whitewater)
  - Big Red Baseball Field, Granville, Ohio (Host: Denison University)
  - Ben Hines Baseball Field, La Verne, California (Host: University of La Verne)
  - Woods Field, Marshall, Texas (Host: East Texas Baptist University)
  - Donnie Williams Sea Gull Baseball Stadium, Salisbury, Maryland (Host: Salisbury University)
  - Captains Park, Newport News, Virginia (Host: Christopher Newport University)
  - North Field, Beverly, Massachusetts (Host: Endicott College)
  - Hugh Stephens Field at Estes Park, Ashland, Virginia (Host: Randolph–Macon College)

College World Series

- May 31–June 6
  - Classic Park, Eastlake, Ohio (Host: North Coast Athletic Conference)

== Bids ==
=== Automatic bids ===
Conference	School	Record
AEC	Immaculata	26–16
AMCC	Penn State Behrend	25–11
ARC	Coe	29–14
ASC	Concordia (TX)	27–16
C2C	Christopher Newport	26–9
CCC	Endicott	39–2
CCIW	Millikin	26–14
Centennial	Johns Hopkins	32–9
E8	St. John Fisher	26–17
GNAC	Mitchell	31–11
HCAC	Hanover	30–15
Landmark	Scranton	30–11
LEC	Mass Dartmouth	24–18–1
Liberty	Ithaca	31–9
MAC Commonwealth	Alvernia	28–16
MAC Freedom	Misericordia	33–9
MASCAC	Bridgewater State	26–14
MIAA	Adrian	29–12
MIAC	Bethel	23–14
MWC	Beloit	22–15
NAC	Husson	23–9
NACC	Benedictine	32–12
NCAC	Denison	39–6
NESCAC	Middlebury	27–10
NEWMAC	Babson	29–11
NJAC	Ramapo	28–14
NWC	Willamette	28–13
OAC	Baldwin Wallace	36–8
ODAC	Lynchburg	30–15
PAC	Washington & Jefferson	31–10
SAA	Centre	34–11
SCAC	Centenary	23–18
SCIAC	Pomona-Pitzer	31–11
Skyline	St. Joseph's (L.I.)	33–12
SLIAC	Spalding	30–10
SUNYAC	New Paltz	29–13
UAA	Case Western Reserve	30–7
UMAC	Crown (MN)	21–20
United East	Keystone	31–11
USA South	North Carolina Wesleyan	33–11
WIAC	Wisconsin–Whitewater	35–8

=== At-large bids ===
Conference	School	Record
ASC	East Texas Baptist	36–8
C2C	Salisbury	28–9
HCAC	Transylvania	32–12
Landmark	Catholic	31–12
Landmark	Elizabethtown	31–12
LEC	Eastern Connecticut State	29–13
MAC Freedom	Arcadia	31–12
NESCAC	Colby	29–10
NEWMAC	Salve Regina	33–8
NJAC	Rowan	27–13
ODAC	Randolph–Macon	28–13
SAA	Birmingham–Southern	26–14
SCAC	Trinity (TX)	31–12
SCIAC	Cal Lutheran	25–13
SCIAC	Claremont-Mudd-Scripps	30–13
SCIAC	La Verne	26–12–1
SUNYAC	Cortland	30–12–1
United East	Penn State Harrisburg	34–9
WIAC	Wisconsin–La Crosse	31–13

== Regionals and Super Regionals ==
Bold indicates winner. Seeds for regional tournaments indicate seeds within regional. Seeds for super regional tournaments indicate national seeds only.

=== Whitewater Super Regional ===
Regional	Regional
1	**Wis.-Whitewater**	**9**
4	Crown (MN)	2
1	**Wis.-Whitewater**	**20**
3	Cal Lutheran	3
2	Centre	0
3	**Cal Lutheran**	**7**
Whitewater Regional – James B. Miller Stadium
4	Crown (MN)	5
2	**Centre**	**16**
2	**Centre**	**7**
3	Cal Lutheran	6
1	**Wisconsin-La Crosse**	**19**
4	Bethel (MN)	2
1	Wis.-La Crosse	11
3	**Coe**	**12**
2	Benedictine (IL)	9
3	**Coe**	**12**
La Crosse Regional – Copeland Park
4	Bethel	4
2	**Benedictine (IL)**	**12**
2	Benedictine (IL)	15
1	**Wis.-La Crosse**	**18**

Regional Final
1	**Wis.-Whitewater**	**6**	–
2	Centre	4	–
3	Coe	11	7
1	**Wis.-La Crosse**	**18**	**9**

Super Regional
**Wis.-Whitewater**	2	**8**	**8**
Wis.-La Crosse	**3**	0	2

=== Granville Super Regional ===
Regional	Regional
1	**Denison**	**15**
4	Hanover	1
1	**Denison**	**26**
2	Rowan	7
2	**Rowan**	**10**
3	Millikin	6
Granville Regional – Big Red Baseball Field
4	**Hanover**	**4**
3	Millikin	3
4	Hanover	7
2	**Rowan**	**14**
1	**Spalding**	**7**
4	Beloit	3
1	Spalding	2
3	**Birmingham-So.**	**4**
2	Transylvania	7
3	**Birmingham–So.**	**21**
Lexington Regional – Legends Field
4	Beloit	5
2	**Transylvania**	**5**
2	**Transylvania**	**6**
1	Spalding	5

Regional Final
1	**Denison**	**13**	–
2	Rowan	0	–
3	**Birmingham-So.**	**5**	–
2	Transylvania	2	–

Super Regional
Denison	1	6	–
**Birmingham-So.**	**10**	**7**	–

=== La Verne Super Regional ===
Regional	Regional
1	**CWRU**	**7**
4	Alvernia	4
1	CWRU	0
3	**Lynchburg**	**5**
2	Ithaca	1
3	**Lynchburg**	**3**
Cleveland Regional – Nobby's Ballpark
4	**Alvernia**	**10**
2	Ithaca	4	4	Alvernia	3
1	**CWRU**	**8**

Regional Final
Trinity (TX)	**18**	6	3	0	–
**La Verne**	9	**15**	**12**	**1**	–
San Antonio Regional – Trinity Baseball Field
3	**Lynchburg**	**6**
1	CWRU	5

Super Regional
La Verne	1	4	–
**Lynchburg**	**7**	**6**	–

=== Marshall Super Regional ===
Regional	Regional
1	**East Tex. Baptist**	**5**
4	Centenary (LA)	2
1	**East Tex. Baptist**	**7**
3	Concordia (TX)	3
2	Claremont-M-S	7
3	**Concordia (TX)**	**13**
Cleveland Regional – Nobby's Ballpark
4	Centenary (LA)	5
2	**Claremont-M-S**	**10**	2	**Claremont-M-S**	**6**
3	Concordia (TX)	5

Regional Final
**Pomona-Pitzer**	8	**11**	**10**	**24**	–
Willamette	**13**	5	7	10	–
Claremont Regional – Alumni Field
1	**East Tex. Baptist**	**6**
2	Claremont-M-S	5

Super Regional
**Pomona-Pitzer**	**6**	**8**	–
East Tex. Baptist	4	7	–

=== Salisbury Super Regional ===
Regional	Regional
1	**Salisbury**	**7**
4	UMass Dartmouth	0
1	Salisbury	1
3	**Mitchell**	**5**
2	Babson	3
3	**Mitchell**	**4**
Wellesley Regional – Govoni Field
4	**UMass Dartmouth**	**7**
2	Babson	3
4	UMass Dartmouth	0
1	**Salisbury**	**9**
1	**Salve Regina**	**10**
4	Colby	5
1	**Salve Regina**	**4**
2	Cortland	2
2	**Cortland**	**3**
3	Wash. & Jeff.	2
Cortland Regional – Robert H. Wallace '53 Field
4	Colby	0
3	**Wash. & Jeff.**	**7**
3	**Wash. & Jeff.**	**3**
2	Cortland	1

Regional Final
3	Mitchell	0	0
1	**Salisbury**	**15**	**11**
1	**Salve Regina**	**12**	–
3	Wash. & Jeff.	3	–

Super Regional
Salisbury	8	9	–
**Salve Regina**	**9**	**14**	–

=== Newport News Super Regional ===
Regional	Regional
1	**Chris. Newport**	**3**
4	Immaculata	2
1	**Chris. Newport**	**7**
3	N.C. Wesleyan	2
2	Scranton	0
3	**N.C. Wesleyan**	**6**
Newport News Regional – Captains Park
4	**Immaculata**	**8**
2	Scranton	0
4	Immaculata	0
3	**N.C. Wesleyan**	**4**
1	**Misericordia**	**5**
4	St. John Fisher	2
1	**Misericordia**	**7**
3	Keystone	4
2	Middlebury	5
3	**Keystone**	**10**
Dallas Regional – Tambur Field
4	St. John Fisher	9
2	**Middlebury**	**10**
2	**Middlebury**	**11**
3	Keystone	6

Regional Final
1	**Chris. Newport**	1	**6**
3	N.C. Wesleyan	**6**	5
1	**Misericordia**	**6**	–
2	Middlebury	4	–

Super Regional
Chris. Newport	1	1	–
**Misericordia**	**3**	**2**	–

=== Beverly Super Regional ===
Regional	Regional
1	**Johns Hopkins**	**12**
4	St. Joseph's (L.I.)	1
1	**Johns Hopkins**	**20**
2	Arcadia	5
2	**Arcadia**	**7**
3	Ramapo	0
Baltimore Regional – Stromberg Stadium
4	St. Joseph's (L.I.)	1
3	**Ramapo**	**4**
3	Ramapo	3
2	**Arcadia**	**10**
1	**Endicott**	**6**
4	Husson	2
1	**Endicott**	**19**
3	New Paltz	12
2	Eastern Conn. St.	1
3	**New Paltz**	**4**
Willimantic Regional – Eastern Baseball Stadium
4	**Husson**	3
**4**	Eastern Conn. St.	2
4	**Husson**	**6**
3	New Paltz	2

Regional Final
1	**Johns Hopkins**	**19**	–
2	Arcadia	4	–
1	**Endicott**	**4**	–
4	Husson	3	–

Super Regional
Johns Hopkins	5	2	–
**Endicott**	**7**	**5**	–

=== Ashland Super Regional ===
Regional	Regional
1	**Penn St.-Harrisburg**	**5**
4	Bridgewater St.	3
1	Penn St.-Harrisburg	3
2	**Randolph-Macon**	**7**
2	**Randolph-Macon**	**4**
3	Elizabethtown	0
Harrisburg Regional – Penn State-Harrisburg Baseball Field
4	Bridgewater St.	3
3	**Elizabethtown**	**8**
3	**Elizabethtown**	**6**
1	Penn St.-Harrisburg	5
1	Baldwin Wallace	4
4	**Penn St.-Behrend**	**10**
4	Penn St.-Behrend	1
3	**Adrian**	**12**
2	Catholic	2
3	**Adrian**	**5**
Berea Regional – Fisher Field
1	Baldwin Wallace	7
2	**Catholic**	**9**
2	**Catholic**	**14**
4	Penn St.-Behrend	2

Regional Final
2	**Randolph-Macon**	**5**	–
3	Elizabethtown	2	–
3	**Adrian**	**9**	–
2	Catholic	8	–

Super Regional
**Randolph-Macon**	**6**	4	**9**
Adrian	5	**5**	6

== Championship bracket ==
The championship bracket was held at Classic Park in Eastlake, Ohio.

=== Bracket ===
First round	Second round
4	Pomona-Pitzer	3
5	Misericordia	6
5	Misericordia	2
8	Lynchburg	6
1	Endicott	2
8	Lynchburg	7
Bracket 1
4	Pomona-Pitzer	6
1	Endicott	7
1	Endicott	4
5	Misericordia	12
2	Salve Regina	7
7	Birmingham-So.	5
2	Salve Regina	2
3	Wis.-Whitewater	0
3	Wis.-Whitewater	11
6	Randolph-Macon	3
Bracket 2
7	Birmingham-So.	9
6	Randolph-Macon	7
3	Wis.-Whitewater	11
7	Birmingham-So.	10

Semifinals
5	Misericordia	3	5
8	Lynchburg	2	1
2	Salve Regina	4	2
3	Wis.-Whitewater	7	5

Finals
5	Misericordia	12	10	10
3	Wis.-Whitewater	9	16	5

=== Finals ===
==== Game 1 ====
June 4, 2024 7:00 p.m. (EDT) at Classic Park in Eastlake, Ohio
Team	1	2	3	4	5	6	7	8	9	R	H	E
Wis.-Whitewater	2	0	0	0	6	0	0	1	0	9	12	2
Misericordia	0	5	0	5	0	0	1	1	0	12	16	2
WP: Matt Lanzendorfer LP: Max Huseboe; Home runs: UWW: Eli Frank (15), Adam Cootway (18); MIS: None; Attendance: 189; Box Score

==== Game 2 ====
June 6, 2024 11:00 a.m. (EDT) at Classic Park in Eastlake, Ohio
Team	1	2	3	4	5	6	7	8	9	R	H	E
Misericordia	0	1	0	0	0	0	3	4	2	10	18	3
Wis.-Whitewater	1	5	1	0	4	1	0	4	-	16	19	0
WP: Michael Hilker Jr. LP: Joe Valenti; Home runs: MIS: None; UWW: Aaron Holland (7), Matt Scolan (19), Eli Frank (16), Andy Thies (2, 17); Box Score

==== Game 3 ====
June 6, 2024 3:00 p.m. (EDT) at Classic Park in Eastlake, Ohio
Team	1	2	3	4	5	6	7	8	9	R	H	E
Wis.-Whitewater	0	0	0	2	0	0	0	3	0	5	11	1
Misericordia	7	0	2	0	1	0	0	0	-	14	13	1
WP: Connor Maryniak LP: Cade Berendt; Home runs: UWW: None; MIS: None; Box Score

== See also ==
- 2024 NCAA Division I baseball tournament
- 2024 NCAA Division II baseball tournament
- 2024 NCAA Division I softball tournament
