= Ben Light =

Ben Light may refer to:

- Ben Light (coach) (1911–1971), American college sports coach, professor, and administrator
- Ben Light (pianist) (1893–1965), American pianist
