= Dennis Kayser =

American football coach and executive

Biographical details
- Born: c. 1954

Playing career

Football
- c. 1973: Ithaca

Lacrosse
- c. 1973: Ithaca

Coaching career (HC unless noted)

Football
- 1984–1985: Dartmouth (assistant)
- 1986–1989: Cortland

Lacrosse
- 1978: Union (NY)
- 1979–1980: Springfield (MA)

Head coaching record
- Overall: 26–15 (football); 10–23 (lacrosse)
- Tournaments: Football; 2–1 (NCAA D-III playoffs)

Dennis Kayser (born c. 1954) is an American football executive and former coach. He is the senior director of on-field operations for the National Football League (NFL). Kayser was the head football coach at State University of New York at Cortland in Cortland, New York from 1986 to 1989, where he accumulated a record of 26–15 and took the Red Dragons to the NCAA Division III playoffs twice.

== Head coaching record ==
=== College football ===
Year	Team	Overall	Conference	Standing	Bowl/playoffs
Cortland Red Dragons (NCAA Division III independent) (1986–1989)
1986	Cortland	1–8			
1987	Cortland	5–4			
1988	Cortland	11–1			L NCAA Division III Quarterfinal
1989	Cortland	9–2			L NCAA Division III First Round
Cortland:		26–15			
Total:		26–15			
