= 2024 College World Series =

2024 College World Series may refer to:

- 2024 Men's College World Series, the final stage of the 2024 NCAA Division I baseball tournament
- 2024 Women's College World Series, the final stage of the 2024 NCAA Division I softball tournament
- The final stage of the 2024 NCAA Division III baseball tournament
