= My Melancholy Baby =

1912 song by Theron C. Bennett

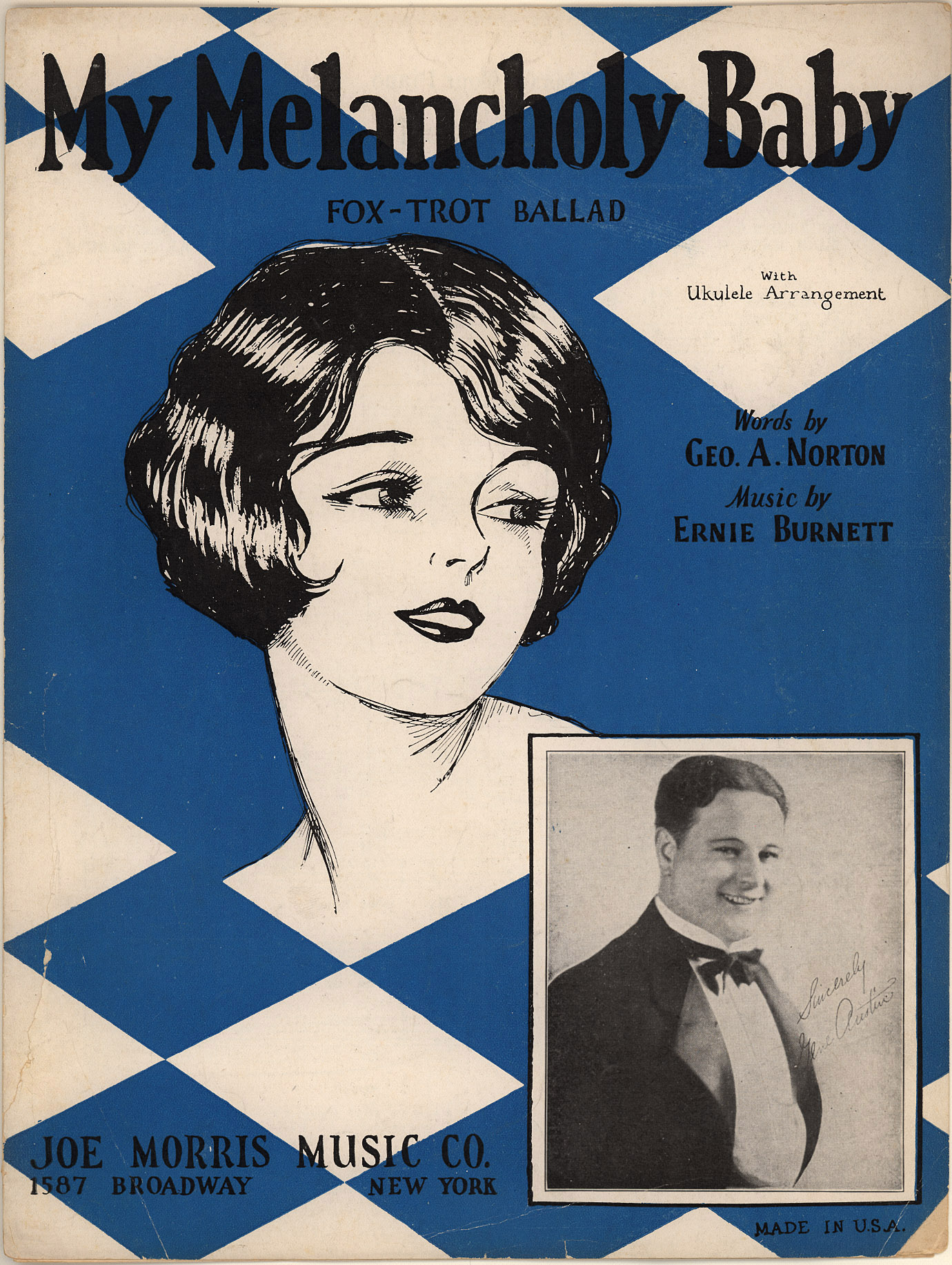
- 1928 sheet music cover featuring Gene Austin

Song by Gene Austin
- B-side: "There's A Cradle In Carolina"
- Published: 1912 by Theron C. Bennett
- Released: December 2, 1927
- Recorded: September 14, 1927
- Studio: Victor Studios, New York City
- Genre: Jazz
- Label: Victor 21015
- Composer: Ernie Burnett
- Lyricist: George A. Norton

Gene Austin singles chronology
"My Blue Heaven" (1927)	"My Melancholy Baby" (1927)	"Ramona" (1928)

My Melancholy Baby
Sung by Walter Van Brunt in 1915. (Edison Blue Amberol 2542)

"My Melancholy Baby" is a popular song published in 1912 and first sung publicly by William Frawley. The music was written by Ernie Burnett (1884–1959), the lyrics by George A. Norton.

== Background ==
Ernie Burnett, who is credited with composing the music, was wounded fighting in the First World War, from which he lost his memory and his identity dog tags. While recuperating in hospital, a pianist entertained the patients with popular tunes including "Melancholy Baby". Burnett rose from his sickbed and exclaimed, "That's my song!" He had regained his memory. A potential contender for the songwriting credit of "My Melancholy Baby" is the American pianist Ben Light. He claimed to have composed the song in 1908 as a teenager, although he did not pursue copyright protection for his work.

== William Frawley version ==
William Frawley, who played Fred Mertz on I Love Lucy, stated that he was the first person to perform the song publicly, in 1912 in the Mozart Cafe at 1647 Curtis Street in Denver, Colorado. Frawley revealed this during a May 3, 1965, appearance on the TV game show I've Got a Secret.

In 1958, Frawley performed the song again on the Lucy-Desi Comedy Hour on the episode "Lucy Goes to Sun Valley". Frawley, as Fred Mertz, was asked by Ricky to perform "an old-fashioned ballad" for his band's appearance on a TV show. Mertz sang the song in the rehearsal scene for the musical number.

== Other performances ==
- The song was also recorded by Walter Van Brunt (1915), Gene Austin (1928), Jane Froman for Decca (1934), Al Bowlly (1935), and Teddy Wilson.
- Al Bowlly recorded the song, along with "The Very Thought of You", for British Pathé in 1934 with pianist Monia Litter.
- The song can be heard often throughout the 1939 Warner Brothers gangster movie The Roaring Twenties, where a vocal rendition of the song is performed by co-star Priscilla Lane.
- Bing Crosby recorded the song for Decca Records on December 12, 1938 and it reached number 14 in the charts of the day.
- Crosby sang the song in the 1941 Oscar-nominated movie Birth of the Blues.
- Harry James recorded a version in 1941 on the Columbia label.
- In the 1942 film Johnny Eager, the song was played during the opening and closing credits, as background music throughout the film, and as dance music by the band at Tony Luce's place. It was not credited.
- The song appears both incidentally and in thematic background variations in the musical score of Fritz Lang's 1945 film Scarlet Street, starring Joan Bennett and Edward G. Robinson.
- Judy Garland sang it during the "Born in a Trunk" sequence in the 1954 movie A Star Is Born after a drunken man persistently shouted, "Sing 'Melancholy Baby'!"
- Also in 1954, John Serry Sr. arranged and recorded the song for his swing jazz accordion ensemble for radio broadcasts on NBC within the RCA Thesaurus library.
- Connie Francis recorded the song in 1958 for inclusion in her first MGM studio album Who's Sorry Now.
- In 1962, a recording by The Marcels went to #58 on the US Hot 100.
- Many jazz musicians recorded "My Melancholy Baby", or used its harmonic sequence to improvise: they include Dave Brubeck with Jimmy Rushing (1958), Bill Evans (1966), Lennie Tristano, Lee Konitz, Warne Marsh (1957), Thelonious Monk (1971) and Bert Kaempfert (1973).
- Tommy Edwards' version of the song, from his album For Young Lovers, reached No. 15 in the U.S. Music Vendor charts in 1959.

== Copyright dispute ==
In 1911 Maybelle Watson, the wife of Ernie Burnett, wrote the original lyrics to the song, which was copyrighted under the name "Melancholy". When Burnett sold the song, the publisher insisted songwriter George A. Norton revise the lyrics. Subsequent issues of the sheet music displayed only a dedication to "Miss Maybelle Watson of Berkeley", rather than a lyricist credit. In 1940 Maybelle Watson Bergmann, having by then divorced Burnett and remarried, successfully sued for royalties. For a number of years after that, her name appeared as co-lyricist with Norton.
