= George A. Norton =

American lyricist

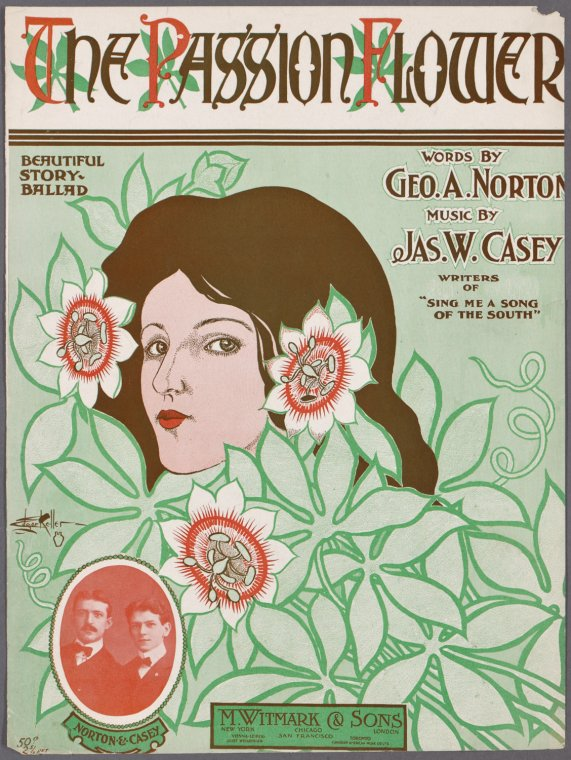
Sheet music cover for "The Passion Flower" by Norton and Casey (shown bottom left), 1901

George Addison Norton (April 18, 1880 – November 18, 1923), usually credited as George A. Norton, was an American lyricist and composer of popular songs.

== Biography ==
He was born in St. Louis, Missouri. His earliest credits came in 1899, with "In the Shenandoah Valley" and "Sing Me a Song of the South", both written with composer James W. Casey (1875–1964). In 1903, Norton's song "Mary from Maryland" was used in a Broadway show, The Girl from Dixie. He found employment with Theron C. Bennett, a music publisher with offices in New York, Memphis, and Denver, and in 1912, at Bennett's request, he rewrote the lyrics to W. C. Handy's "The Memphis Blues", described as "the first commercial blues ever published".

The same year, Norton rewrote the lyrics to another song, "Melancholy", which had been written by a married couple, Maybelle and Ernie Burnett, before they divorced. Retitled "My Melancholy Baby", the revised song was introduced by William Frawley in Denver and was later recorded successfully by Al Bowlly, Bing Crosby and many others. Norton also wrote "I'm Goin' Back to Memphis, Tennessee", recorded by Collins & Harlan. In 1917, he was credited with writing both words and music for "Round her Neck She Wears A Yeller Ribbon (For Her Lover Who is Fur Fur Away)", one of the inspirations for the 1973 song "Tie a Yellow Ribbon Round the Ole Oak Tree".

Norton died from tuberculosis in Tucson, Arizona, in 1923, aged 43.
