= Lake County Captains =

American Minor League baseball team

- Founded in 1991 in Columbus, Georgia; Based in Eastlake, Ohio since 2003
Team logo
Cap insignia

Minor league affiliations
- Class: High-A (2021–present)
- Previous classes: Class A (1991–2020)
- League: Midwest League (2010–present)
- Division: East Division
- Previous leagues: South Atlantic League (1991–2009)

Major league affiliations
- Team: Cleveland Indians / Guardians (1991–present)

Minor league titles
- League titles (2): 2010; 2024
- Division titles (8): 2000; 2002; 2003; 2010; 2014; 2021; 2022; 2024
- First-half titles (10): 1992; 1994; 1999; 2000; 2003; 2008; 2010; 2019; 2024; 2025
- Second-half titles (7): 1995; 1996; 2002; 2003; 2012; 2014; 2022

Team data
- Name: Lake County Captains (2003–present)
- Previous names: Columbus RedStixx (1992–2002); Columbus Indians (1991)
- Colors: Navy, yellow, red, white
- Mascots: Skipper, Horatio, Skippy, Captain Clipper, Captain Kenny, and the Baseball Bug
- Ballpark: Classic Auto Group Park (2003–present)
- Previous parks: Golden Park (1991–2002)
- Owner(s)/ Operator(s): Alan Miller, Jon Ryan and Collide NEO
- General manager: Jen Yorko
- Manager: Omir Santos
- Media: MiLB.TV, WFUN 970 AM, and WINT 1330 AM
- Website: milb.com/lake-county

The Lake County Captains are a Minor League Baseball team in Eastlake, Ohio, a suburb of Cleveland, that plays in the Midwest League as the High-A affiliate of the Cleveland Guardians.

The Captains joined the Class A Midwest League following the 2009 season in a shuffle caused by the Columbus Catfish's move to Bowling Green, Kentucky, for the 2009 season. The move alleviated travel costs and time, as the Captains had been the South Atlantic League's northernmost team.

Before the 2003 season, the club was based in Columbus, Georgia, and known as the Columbus RedStixx. The Captains play their home games at Classic Auto Group Park, which has a capacity of 6,157 and was previously known as Eastlake Stadium, having opened in 2003. The current stadium name results from a naming rights arrangement; the sponsor is Classic Automotive Group, a significant area chain of auto dealerships. Classic Auto Group Park hosted the South Atlantic League All-Star Game on June 20, 2006.

In conjunction with Major League Baseball's restructuring of Minor League Baseball in 2021, the Captains were organized into the High-A Central. In 2022, the High-A Central became known as the Midwest League, the name historically used by the regional circuit before the 2021 reorganization.

== Franchise regular season win–loss records ==
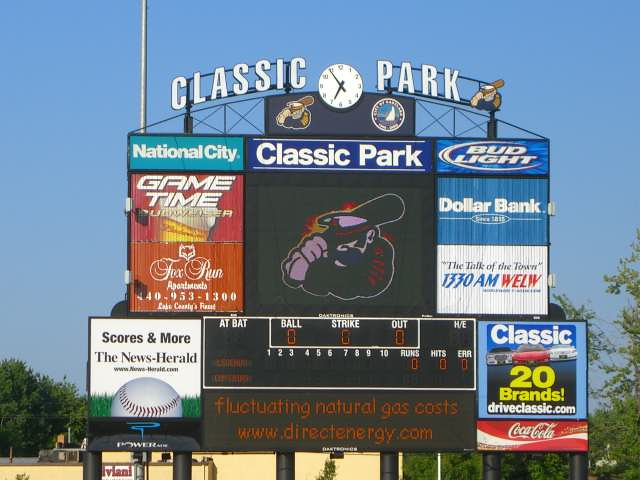
Scoreboard prior to a Captains game at Classic Auto Group Park

Columbus Indians (73–69)

- 1991: 73–69

Columbus RedStixx (823–711)

- 1992: 77–62 (1st Half SAL Southern Division Champions)
- 1993: 86–56
- 1994: 87–51 (1st Half SAL Southern Division Champions)
- 1995: 80–62 (2nd Half SAL Southern Division Champions)
- 1996: 79–63 (2nd Half SAL Southern Division Champions)
- 1997: 62–76
- 1998: 59–81
- 1999: 70–71 (1st Half SAL Southern Division Champions)
- 2000: 67–70 (1st Half SAL Southern Division Champions - SAL Ruuner-up)
- 2001: 77–59
- 2002: 79–60 (2nd Half SAL Southern Division Champions - SAL Runner-up)

Lake County Captains (1450–1413 entering 2026)

- 2003: 97–43 (1st & 2nd Half SAL Northern Division Champions - MWL Runner-up)
  (Best regular season record in pro baseball, min 120 games)
- 2004: 73–66
- 2005: 72–66
- 2006: 64–74
- 2007: 64–74
- 2008: 75–65 (1st Half SAL Northern Division Champions - Lost in Semifinals)
- 2009: 71–66
- 2010: 77–62 (1st Half Eastern Division Champions – MWL Champions)
- 2011: 53–86
- 2012: 71–68 (2nd Half MWL Wild Card - Lost in Semifinal Round)
- 2013: 54–83
- 2014: 65–74 (2nd Half MWL Wild Card - MWL Runner-up)
- 2015: 71–66
- 2016: 72–68
- 2017: 54–85
- 2018: 60–79
- 2019: 74–64 (1st Half MWL Wild Card - Lost in Quarterfinal Round)
- 2020: Season Suspended due to COVID-19 Pandemic
- 2021: 65–55
- 2022: 76–53 (2nd Half MWL East Division Champions - MWL Runner-up)
- 2023: 65–64
- 2024: 77-52 (1st Half MWL East Division Champions - MWL Champions)
- 2025: 74-58 (1st Half MWL East Division Champions)

== Franchise records ==
- Win–loss record entering 2024:

- 2215–2058 (.518) overall
- 1373–1361 (.502) as the Lake County Captains

- Longest winning streak: 13 games (May 27 – June 8, 2003)
- Longest losing streak: 10 games (June 8–18, 2011) & (April 10–19, 2012)
- Pitcher with most wins in a season: Steve Kline, 18 in 1994 (also league leader that year)
- Hitter with most home runs in a season: Russell Branyan, 40 in 1996 (also league leader that year)

== Playoffs (since 2005) ==
- 2008: Lost to West Virginia 2–1 in semifinals
- 2010: Defeated West Michigan 2–1 in quarterfinals; Defeated Great Lakes 2–1 in semifinals; Defeated Clinton 3-2 in finals
- 2012: Defeated Bowling Green 2–0 in quarterfinals; lost to Fort Wayne 2–0 in semifinals
- 2014: Defeated South Bend 2–0 in quarterfinals; defeated Fort Wayne 2–0 in semifinals; lost to Kane County 3–0 in finals
- 2019: Lost to Great Lakes 2–1 in quarterfinals
- 2022: Lost to South Bend 2-1 in finals
- 2024: Defeated Wisconsin 2-1 in finals

== Roster ==
Lake County Captains roster
| Players | Coaches/Other |
|---|---|
| Pitchers: 38 Braylon Doughty; 32 Luis Flores; 30 Jogly Garcia; 41 Franklin Gómez; 44 Melkis Hernández; 33 Jackson Humphries; 31 Michael Kennedy; 12 Izaak Martinez; 40 Xavier Martinez; 36 Logun McGuire; 22 Rafe Schlesinger; 39 Cam Schuelke; 46 Kendeglys Virguez; 47 Cameron Walty; 34 Donovan Zsak; Catchers: 15 Logun Clark; 16 Bennett Thompson; Infielders: 7 Maick Collado; 11 Dean Curley; 23 Luke Hill; 10 Garrett Howe; 0 Jeffrey Mercedes; 2 Kevin Rivas; 24 Nolan Schubart; Outfielders: 27 Ryan Cesarini; 9 Esteban González; 6 Tommy Hawke; 17 Jace LaViolette; 26 Aaron Walton | Manager: 29 Omir Santos; Coaches: -- Bryce Ball (hitting); 4 Ian Forster (hitting); 13 Jonathan Lopez (development); 37 Shane McCarthy (pitching); 8 Eric Stamets (bench); 60-day injured list: -- Josh Harlow; -- Kyle Scott; -- Anthony Silva; -- Conner Whittaker; 7-day injured list; * On Cleveland Guardians 40-man roster; ~ Development list; # Rehab assignment; ∞ Reserve list; ‡ Restricted list; § Suspended list; † Temporarily inactive list; Roster updated May 19, 2026; Transactions; → More rosters: MiLB • Midwest League; → Cleveland Guardians minor league players |

== Notable franchise alumni ==
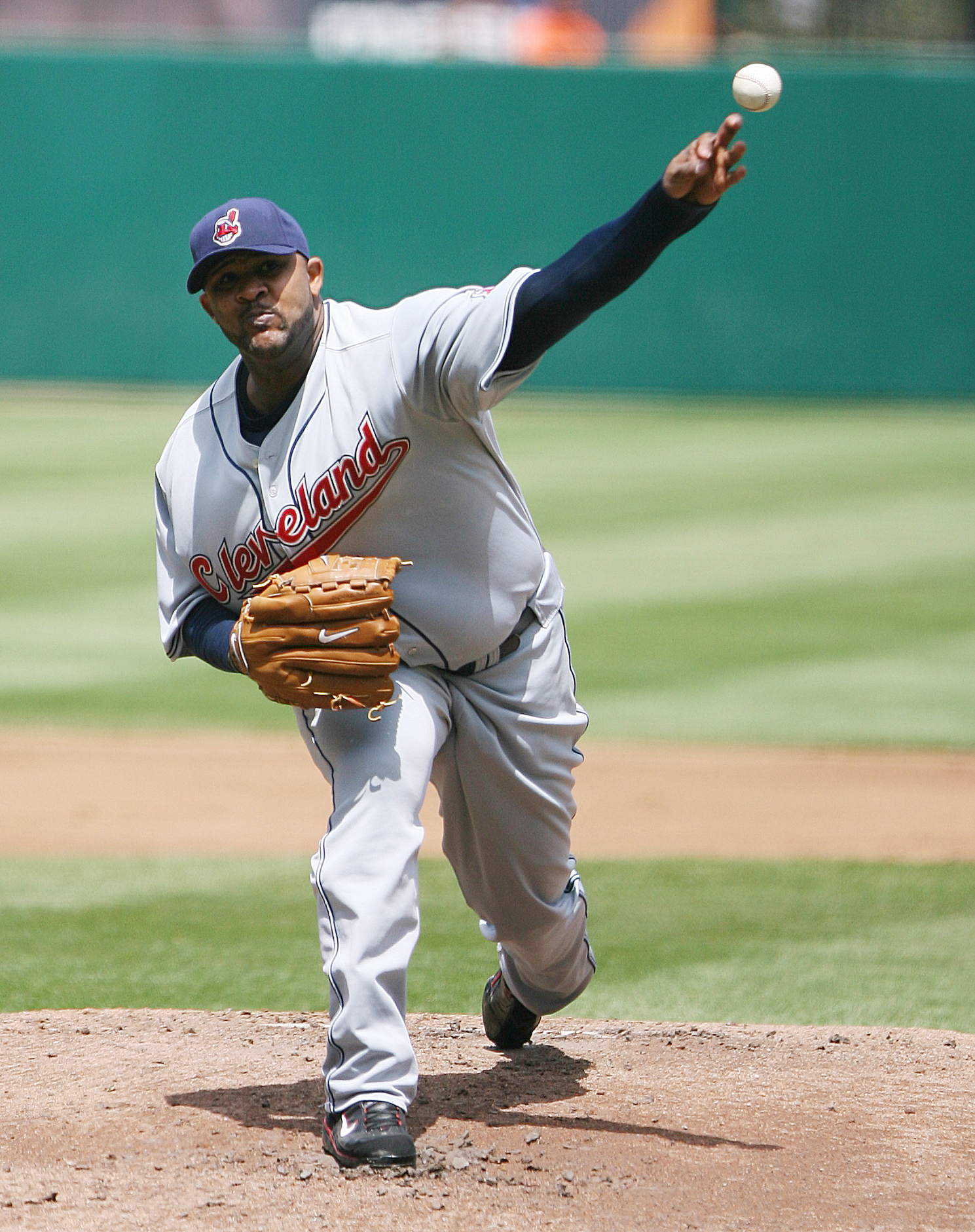
CC Sabathia

- Chris Archer (2007–2009) 2x MLB All-Star
- David Bell (1991)
- Tanner Bibee (2022)
- Russell Branyan (1995–1996)
- Roberto Hernandez (2003, 2008–2009, 2012) MLB All-Star
- Einar Diaz (1993–1994)
- Alan Embree (1991)
- Maicer Izturis (1999–2000)
- Steve Kline (1994)
- Ted Kubiak (2010–2011, MGR)
- Tim Laker (2002)
- Francisco Lindor (2012) 2x MLB All-Star
- Albie Lopez (1992)
- Torey Lovullo (2002, MGR) 2017 NL Manager of the Year
- Ángel Martínez (2022)
- Víctor Martínez (2000) 5x MLB All-Star
- Dave Mlicki (1991)
- Eli Morgan (2018)
- Jhonkensy Noel (2021–2022)
- Jhonny Peralta (2000) 3x MLB All-Star
- Scott Radinsky (2005, coach)
- José Ramírez (2012) MLB All-Star
- CC Sabathia (1999) 6x MLB All-Star; 2007 AL Cy Young Award
- Danny Salazar (2009–2010) MLB All-Star
- Marco Scutaro (1996) MLB All-Star
- Richie Sexson (1994) 2x MLB All-Star
- Kelly Stinnett (1991)
- Eric Wedge (1998, MGR) 2007 AL Manager of the Year
- Jaret Wright (1995)
- Steven Wright (2007, 2011) MLB All-Star

== Captains Call-Up Club ==
The names of all Captains players and franchise alumni who have advanced to play Major League Baseball are enshrined in the Lake County Captains Call-Up Club at Classic Auto Group Park. The Call-Up Club includes former Captains, coaches, and managers who've made it to the Major League Baseball coaching staff. A new wall of bronze plaques was installed at the main entrance of Classic Auto Group Park in August of the 2017 season. The previous "Walk of Fame" started in the outfield of Classic Auto Group Park and was moved to an interior wall of the ballpark near the right-field corner of the stadium.
