= Ben Light (coach) =

American college sports coach, professor, administrator (1911–1971)

Biographical details
- Born: May 10, 1911; New York City, U.S.
- Died: January 19, 1971 (aged 59); Ithaca, New York, U.S.

Playing career

Football
- 1932–1934: Ithaca

Basketball
- 1932–1936: Ithaca

Baseball
- 1933–1936: Ithaca

Coaching career (HC unless noted)

Football
- 1935: Ithaca (acting HC)
- 1936–1941: Ithaca (freshmen)
- 1945–1951: Ithaca (assistant)

Basketball
- 1936–1942: Ithaca (freshmen)
- 1945–1952: Ithaca

Baseball
- 1937–1942: Ithaca (freshmen)

Golf
- 1947–1952: Ithaca

Administrative career (AD unless noted)
- 1936–1959: Ithaca
- 1952–1959: Ithaca (director of admissions)
- 1959–1968: Ithaca (secretary of the college)
- 1968–1971: Ithaca (VP, development)

Head coaching record
- Overall: 4–1–1 (football); 70–51 (basketball)

Ben Alan Light (May 10, 1911 – January 19, 1971), known as Ben Pismanoff until 1937, was an American college athlete, sports coach, professor, basketball official, and administrator who had a long association with Ithaca College in Ithaca, New York, from the 1930s until his death in 1971. He coached several sports at Ithaca, including football, basketball, baseball, and golf. As a rising senior and football player for the college in 1935, he served as acting head football coach during Bucky Freeman's absence due to illness. Light was Ithaca's head basketball coach from 1945 to 1952.

== Early life and playing career ==
Light was born on May 10, 1911, in New York City. He moved with his family to Albany, New York, where he attended Albany High School. He played football, basketball, and baseball in high school. In 1928–29, Light captained the Albany High School basketball team, which won the Class A State Championship. After graduating from high school, Light coached football, basketball, and baseball, and taught physical education at Vincentian Institute, a Catholic school in Albany.

Light then attended Ithaca College, where he starred in football, basketball, and baseball. In early September, 1935, during Light's senior year, Ithaca's head football coach, Bucky Freeman, was stricken with typhoid fever while at his wife's home in Fort Edward, New York. He spent the entire 1935 fall semester recuperating there. Light was appointed acting head coach and led the team to a record of 4–1–1.

== Coaching career and military service ==
After graduating in 1936, Light remained at Ithaca College as a teacher and coach of the freshman football, basketball, and baseball teams. In June 1937, he legally changed his named from Ben Pismanoff to Ben Light. During World War II, Light served in the United States Coast Guard. He was stationed in both the European and Pacific theaters and reached the rank of lieutenant commander before leaving the military in 1945. After the war, he returned to Ithaca as a coach and assistant professor in physical education. In December 1945, Light was named varsity basketball coach at Ithaca, succeeding Isadore "Doe" Yavits. He also coached golf beginning in 1947.

From 1936, until 1959, when he was appointed Secretary of the College, Light served as graduate manager of athletics. In that role he was responsible for scheduling all intercollegiate sports contests for all Ithaca College sports teams.

== Other pursuits ==
In the late summer of 1947, Light was approached to coach a semi-pro football team in Elmira, New York, named the Elmira Gliders. Sponsored by Athletic Promoters, Inc., of Elmira, the team was composed of former high school and college stars, some from Cornell and Ithaca College. Playing on Sunday nights, the team coached by Light achieved a won-loss record of 12-1. 1947 was the only year Light coached the team. In 1948, coaching duties were assumed by John O'Neill, a football standout from the Ithaca College class of 1942.

Upon returning from military service, and resuming interscholastic and collegiate officiating, it became apparent to Light that there was no coordinated way to obtain officials' clothing, shoes and other gear. In the summer of 1946, he took time off to discuss with various manufacturers whether he could create a business to act as a central location for selling such items, and other sporting goods needed by schools. Satisfied that such a venture was possible, in 1950 he created a corporation known as Alumni Athletic Equipment Co., and began selling officiating uniforms and shoes out of his basement. In or about 1951, he leased space on the second floor of the State Theater Building a few steps from the corner of State and Cayuga Streets in Ithaca, and began running his business from that space.

Beginning in July, 1957, Light moved the sporting goods business from the State Theater Building to a storefront across the street, at 128 West State Street, and expanded his offerings to "a regular line of retail merchandise." Beginning in November, 1957, he changed the name of the business to "fun-tyme," and again expanded his inventory. In April, 1962, he again moved the business from 128 West State Street to 102 West State Street, a corner location.

In the late summer of 1965, Light sold the business to his teacher, coach and mentor "Bucky" Freeman, and his son, Jim Freeman.

== Sports officiating ==
In 1930, while teaching and coaching at Vincentian Institute, Light joined the Adirondack Board of the nascent International Association of Approved Basketball Officials (I.A.A.B.O.), and began officiating interscholastic boys and girls basketball. Upon matriculating at Ithaca College, he transferred from the Adirondack to the Southern New York Board in Elmira, NY, and continued officiating interscholastic basketball. He began officiating college basketball in 1937, while continuing to work high school games. After returning from service in World War II, Light resumed officiating both interscholastic and collegiate basketball. He stopped officiating high school games in or about 1958, shortly before being promoted to Secretary of Ithaca College.

Light was a charter member of the Collegiate Basketball Officials Association (C.B.O.A.), formed by Sam Schoenfeld and four other officials in 1948. He served on the Executive Committees of both the I.A.A.B.O. and the C.B.O.A., and was president of the C.B.O.A. for the 1954-55 season.

Light officiated numerous games between the "Little Three" of Niagara, Canisius and St. Bonaventure over his officiating career. He was one of the officials who worked the Niagara-St. Bonaventure game on February 25, 1961 at the Olean Armory, where Niagara defeated St. Bonaventure to end Bonaventure's 99 game home winning streak.

In September, 1962, he was selected by the U.S. Air Force to join Joe Zerilla, a fellow official from the Pittsburgh, PA area, and John Wooden and Ken Norton, coaches of U.C.L.A. and Manhattan College, respectively, to conduct basketball coaching and officiating clinics in Europe.

He retired from collegiate basketball officiating following the 1963-64 season, after almost 25 years of intercollegiate basketball officiating.

== Administrative career ==
In 1952, Light was appointed director of admissions and placement, a newly-created position at Ithaca College. He ceased his coaching and teaching duties, but retained the position of graduate manager of athletics. At an alumni luncheon in May 1953, less than a year after Light assumed the position of director of admissions, President Job reported that enrollment prospects were "very encouraging." Dr. Job gave credit to Light's efforts, "and the [alumni] who have cooperated so effectively with him." Applications were up significantly, including the applications received from women.

In 1959, Carlton "Carp" Wood was appointed graduate manager of athletics, and Light was promoted to the position of secretary of Ithaca College. As secretary of the college, Light was primarily responsible for negotiating with the Department of Housing and Urban Development (DHUD) and the New York State Dormitory Authority, to raise funds for construction of the new Ithaca College campus. He also oversaw the architects, engineers and contractors who built the campus. His duties also included oversight of college purchasing, transportation, and dining. In 1968, the Board of Trustees promoted him again, to vice president of development, another newly-created position.

== Ithaca College honors ==
As a freshman, Light was elected to membership in Adelphi, the freshman/sophomore honor society which was founded at Ithaca College in 1932. In his junior year, he was elected to membership in Oracle, the Ithaca College senior honor society. Oracle was founded at Ithaca College in 1928.

At the same board meeting where Light was promoted to vice president of development, the Board of Trustees also determined to name the gymnasium in the physical education building as The Ben Light Gymnasium, "in honor of Light's contributions to Ithaca College Athletics as a student, coach, teacher and administrator." In 1969, Light was one of the fifteen original inductees into the Ithaca College Sports Hall of Fame.

== Personal life and death ==
Light and his wife, LaVerne, IC Class of '42, had four sons: Gordon, now deceased; David, also deceased; Charles and Terry. Light died on January 19, 1971, at Tompkins County Hospital in Ithaca, where he had been a patient for several weeks.

== Head coaching record ==
=== Football ===
Year	Team	Overall	Conference	Standing	Bowl/playoffs
Ithaca Blue and Gold (Independent) (1935)
1935	Ithaca	4–1–1			
Ithaca:		4–1–1			
Total:		4–1–1			

=== Basketball ===
Record table
Season	Team	Overall	Conference	Standing	Postseason
Ithaca Bombers (Independent) (1945–1952)
1945–46	Ithaca	9–5			
1946–47	Ithaca	12–5			
1947–48	Ithaca	11–8			
1948–49	Ithaca	16–5			
1949–50	Ithaca	12–6			
1950–51	Ithaca	6–12			
1951–52	Ithaca	4–10			
Ithaca:		70–51			
Total:		70–51			
