= Ben Light (pianist) =

American pianist

Benjamin Bertram Leight (April 23, 1893 – January 6, 1965), better known by his stage name Ben Light was an American pianist.

Light was born on April 23, 1893, in New York City. He had a long career at the keyboard. He started playing the piano at the age of three without a teacher, and made his professional debut at the age of seven. For 15 years, he toured as a vaudeville pianist, performing with renowned figures such as Al Jolson, Eddie Cantor, and Fanny Brice. Known as a musical phenomenon, Ben Light was once timed playing 1,173 notes in a single minute. Light was noted for his fast ragtime play and recorded over 100 piano compositions. He claimed to have written "My Melancholy Baby" as a teenager, but did not copyright the work.

Light died of a heart attack, on January 6, 1965, in Santa Monica, California at the age of 72.
