= Classic Auto Group Park =

Stadium in Eastlake, Ohio

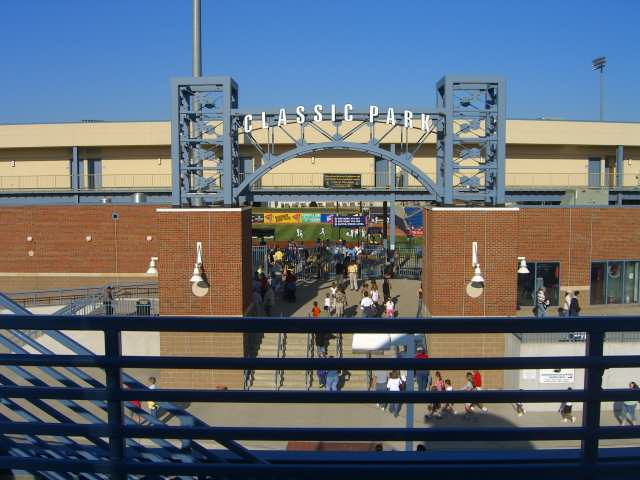

- Location within Ohio Location within the United States
- Location: 35300 Vine Street; Eastlake, OH 44095
- Coordinates: 41°38′28″N 81°26′8″W
- Owner: City of Eastlake
- Operator: Lake County Captains Baseball Club
- Capacity: 6,500
- Field size: Left Field: 320 ft (98 m); Center Field: 400 ft (122 m); Right Field: 320 ft (98 m)

Construction
- Groundbreaking: May 9, 2002
- Opened: April 10, 2003
- Cost: $22 million ($38.5 million in 2025 dollars)
- Architect: DLR Group
- Project manager: Ozanne Construction Company
- Structural engineers: MC Engineers, Inc.
- Services engineers: CT Consultants, Inc.
- General contractor: Turner Construction

Tenants
- Lake County Captains (MWL) 2003–present Lake Erie Storm (NCAA) 2017–present

Classic Auto Group Park is a stadium in Eastlake, Ohio, in the suburbs of Cleveland. It is primarily used for baseball, and is the home field of the Lake County Captains minor league baseball team. It was built in 2003 at a cost of $22 million under the name Eastlake Park and seats 6,500 people.

The stadium’s naming rights were purchased by Classic Automotive Group, a large Cleveland-area chain of auto dealerships.

== Financing ==
In order to construct Classic Park, Eastlake, Ohio assumed $1 million in debt. This debt necessitated cuts in public services, including the laying off of five police officers and a reduction in the scope of police services.

== Features ==
The field was voted as the Best Playing Surface in the South Atlantic League in 2003, 2004 and 2007. Other features include a 4,000-square foot indoor batting facility with two full-sized batting cages. The main clubhouse building is located beyond the right-field corner and houses both the Captains and visiting teams. Each clubhouse features offices for the manager and coaching staff, a training room, and laundry facilities. The Captains' dugout is on the 1st base side, while the visitor dugout is on the 3rd base side.

The ballpark and playing field are available for rent to area businesses and baseball leagues. Many organizations play games at the stadium during the year and the team operates a fundraising program enabling teams to play games there and make money for their organization at the same time.

The stadium features two large party tents which can accommodate up to 500 guests in each one. In addition, there are two private Party Decks located on the suite level which can hold up to 60 people in each one. The park also features 20 party suites which can be rented for the season, half-season, quarter-season or on a game-by-game basis. The suite level also features a full-service bar and an oversized private party suite called The Officer's Club.
