= Woods Field =

Baseball park in Marshall, Texas, US

Coordinates: 32.55766°N 94.37606°W

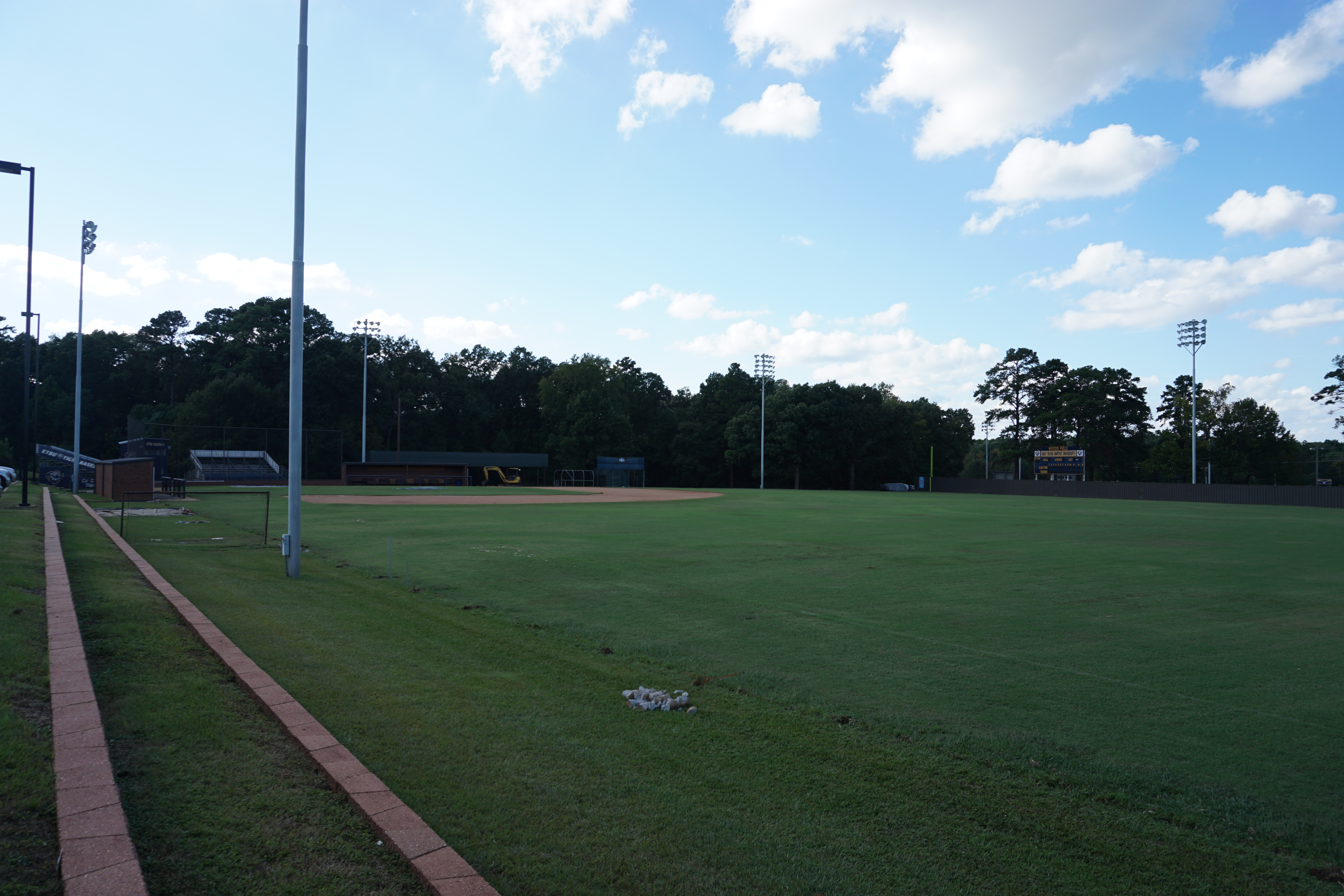
Woods Field

Woods Field is a baseball park located in Marshall, Texas, and home to the East Texas Baptist University Tigers baseball team of the American Southwest Conference.
