= East Texas Baptist University =

Baptist university in Marshall, Texas, US

- Other name: ETBU
- Former names: College of Marshall (1912–1944); East Texas Baptist College (1944–1984)
- Motto: May the Light on the Hill Never Die
- Type: Private university
- Established: 1912; 114 years ago
- Religious affiliation: Baptist General Convention of Texas
- Endowment: US $39,381,819
- President: J. Blair Blackburn
- Undergraduates: 1,771
- Location: Marshall, Texas, U.S. 32.5559°N 94.3732°W
- Campus: Suburban
- Colors: Navy blue & gold
- Sporting affiliations: NCAA Division III – American Southwest Conference
- Mascot: Tiger
- Website: etbu.edu
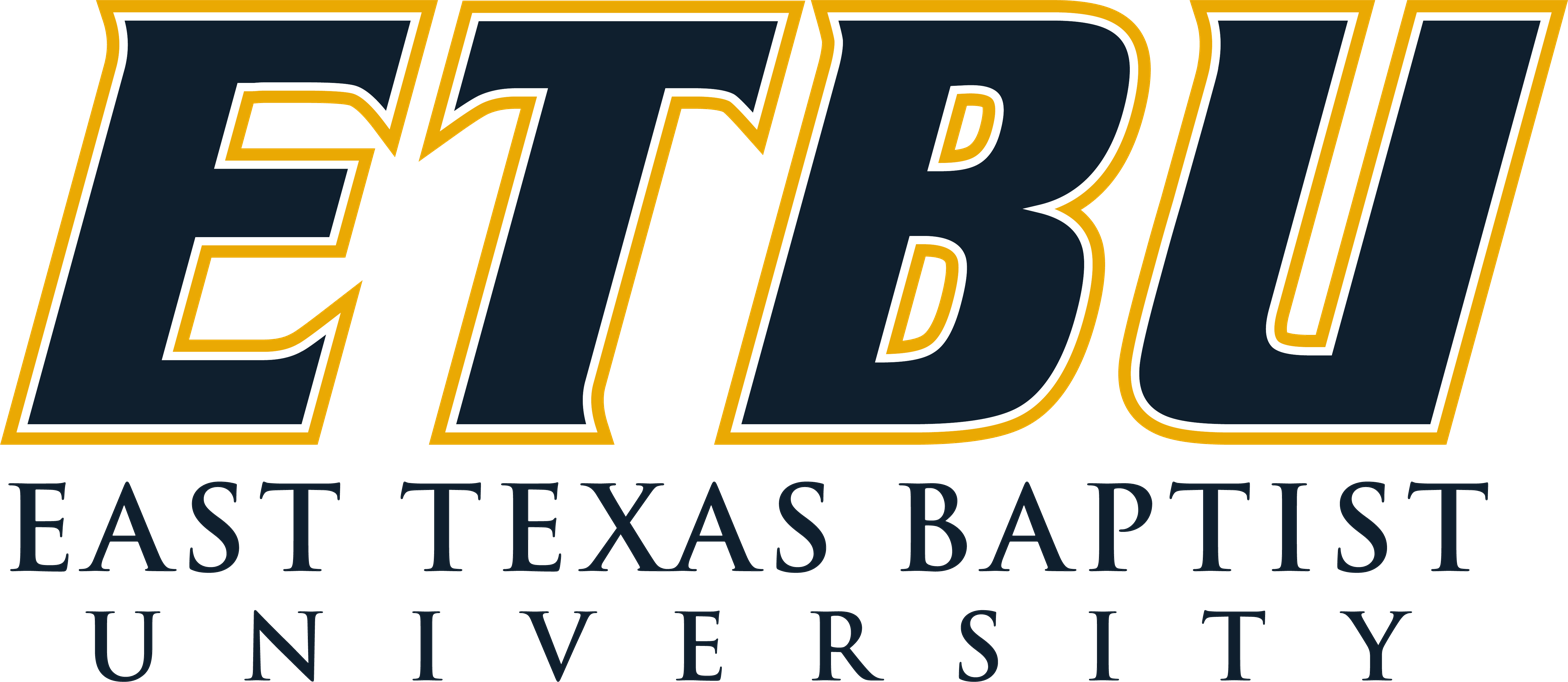

East Texas Baptist University (ETBU) is a private Baptist university in Marshall, Texas, United States. It is affiliated with the Baptist General Convention of Texas.

== History ==
ETBU is located on the site of the former Van Zandt Farm at the highest altitude in Harrison County. It was founded as the College of Marshall in 1912, after a campaign to create a Southern Baptist college in East Texas. The campus' first building, Marshall Hall, was completed in 1916. It was designed to house a gymnasium, library, chapel/theatre, administrative offices, and classrooms. The College of Marshall opened the following year as a two-year junior college and academy. The college was greatly enlarged during the tenure of President Frank Shelby Groner, who served as president of the college from 1928 until 1942. It became East Texas Baptist College in 1944.

In June 2015, J. Blair Blackburn, a native of Minden, Louisiana, was inaugurated as the 13th president of East Texas Baptist University. He succeeded Samuel "Dub" Oliver, who became in 2014 the president of Union University in Jackson, Tennessee.

In 2015, the university applied for and received an exception to Title IX allowing it to discriminate against LGBT students for religious reasons.

In June of 2024, ETBU announced a merger with B.H. Carroll Theological Institute, thus expanding the institution to a level VI institution of higher learning.

== Accreditation ==
ETBU is accredited by the Commission on Colleges of the Southern Association of Colleges and Schools. It also is accredited by the Board of Nurse Examiners for the State of Texas for the bachelor of science in nursing degree, the Commissions of Collegiate Nursing Education, and the National Association of Schools of Music.

== Campus ==
=== Security ===
During the day, the campus is patrolled by the on-campus security officer. Security cameras record 24 hours a day and are monitored from 8:00 am – 10:00 pm. Call boxes are placed in strategic locations around campus. At night, the campus is monitored by private security officers (off-duty Marshall City police officers).

=== Academic buildings ===
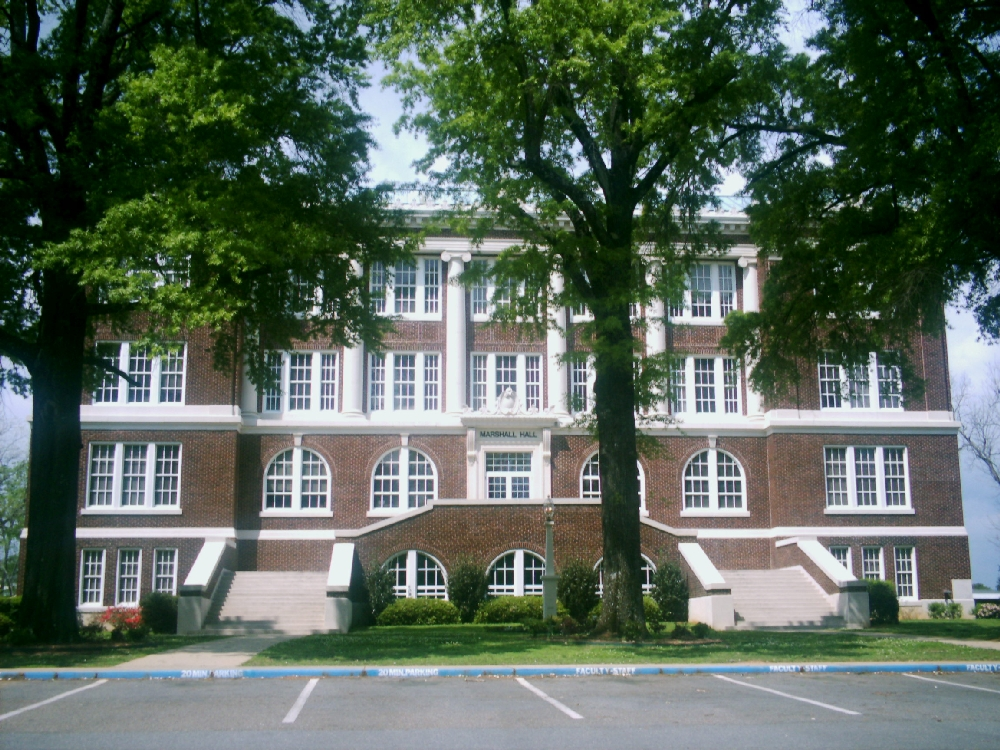
Marshall Hall, construction completed in 1916

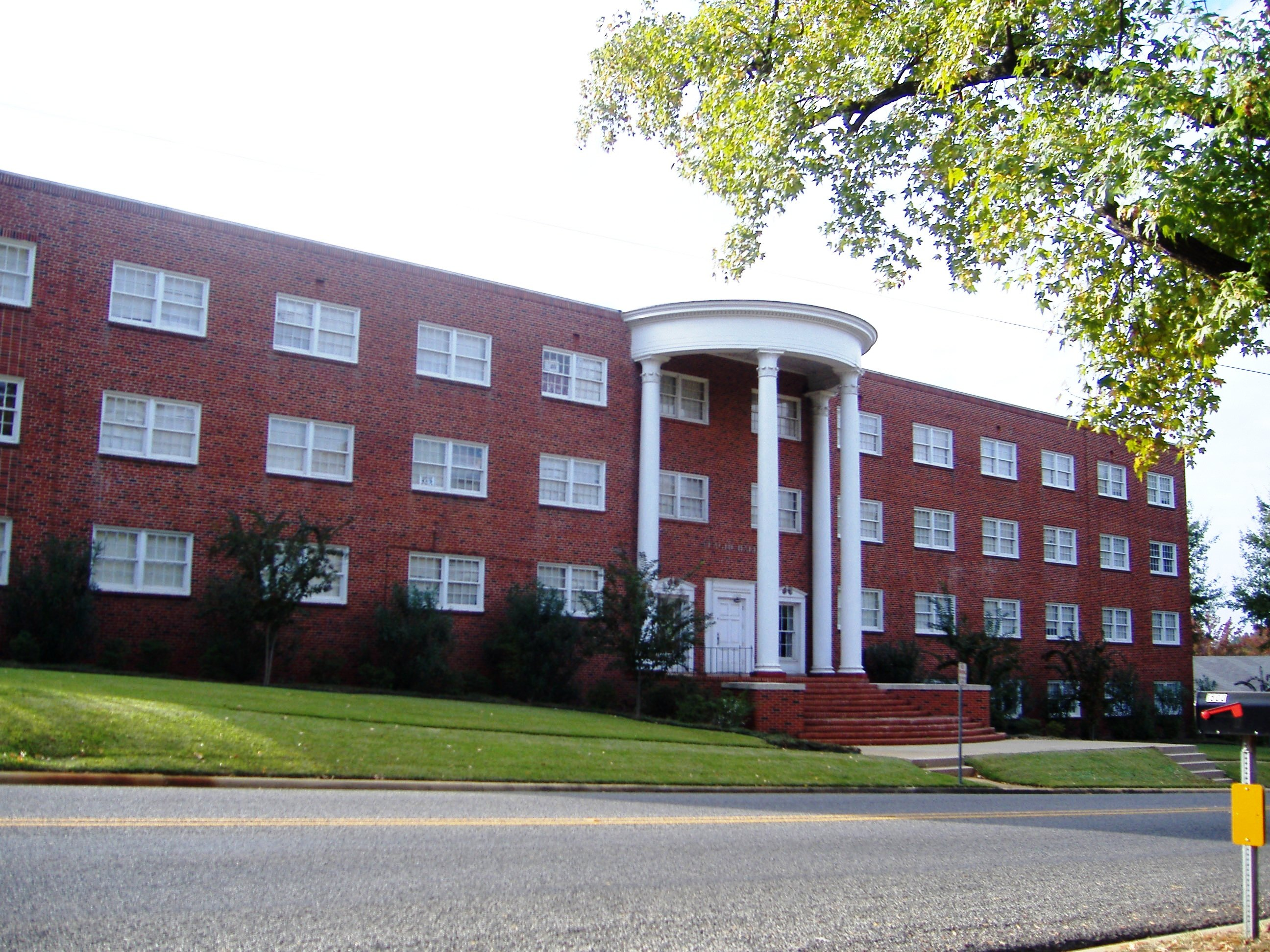
Feagin Hall, built in 1948

- Marshall Hall
- Scarborough Hall
- Rogers Spiritual Life Center
- Ornelas Student Center
- Dean Healthplex
- Craig Hall
- Harvey Daniel Bruce Hall
- Murphy Science Building
- Bennett Student Commons
- Redwine Instrumental Music Building
- Jenna Guest Music Building
- The Great Commission Center
- Mamye Jarrett Learning Center
- Meadows Hall

=== Residence halls ===
- Carlile Hall
- Feagin Hall (closed)
- Fry Hall
- Linebery Hall
- Mabee Housing Complex
- Ornelas Residential Center
- Oaks on Grove
- University Apartments
- University Park Row Apartments
- Foote Hall at Tiger Yard

== Athletics ==
The East Texas Baptist University athletics teams are nicknamed Tigers.

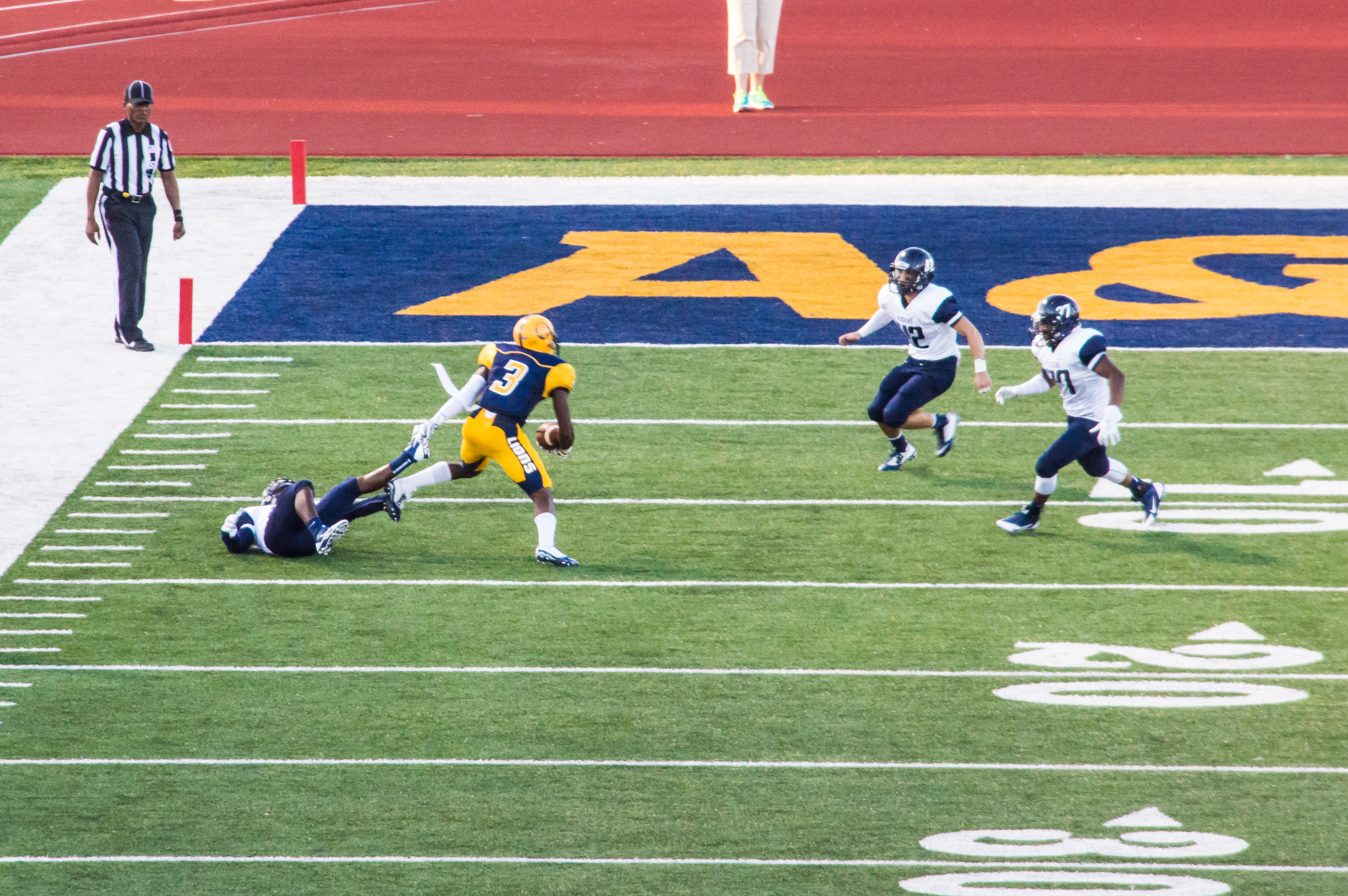
The East Texas Baptist football team in action against the Texas A&M–Commerce Lions in 2014

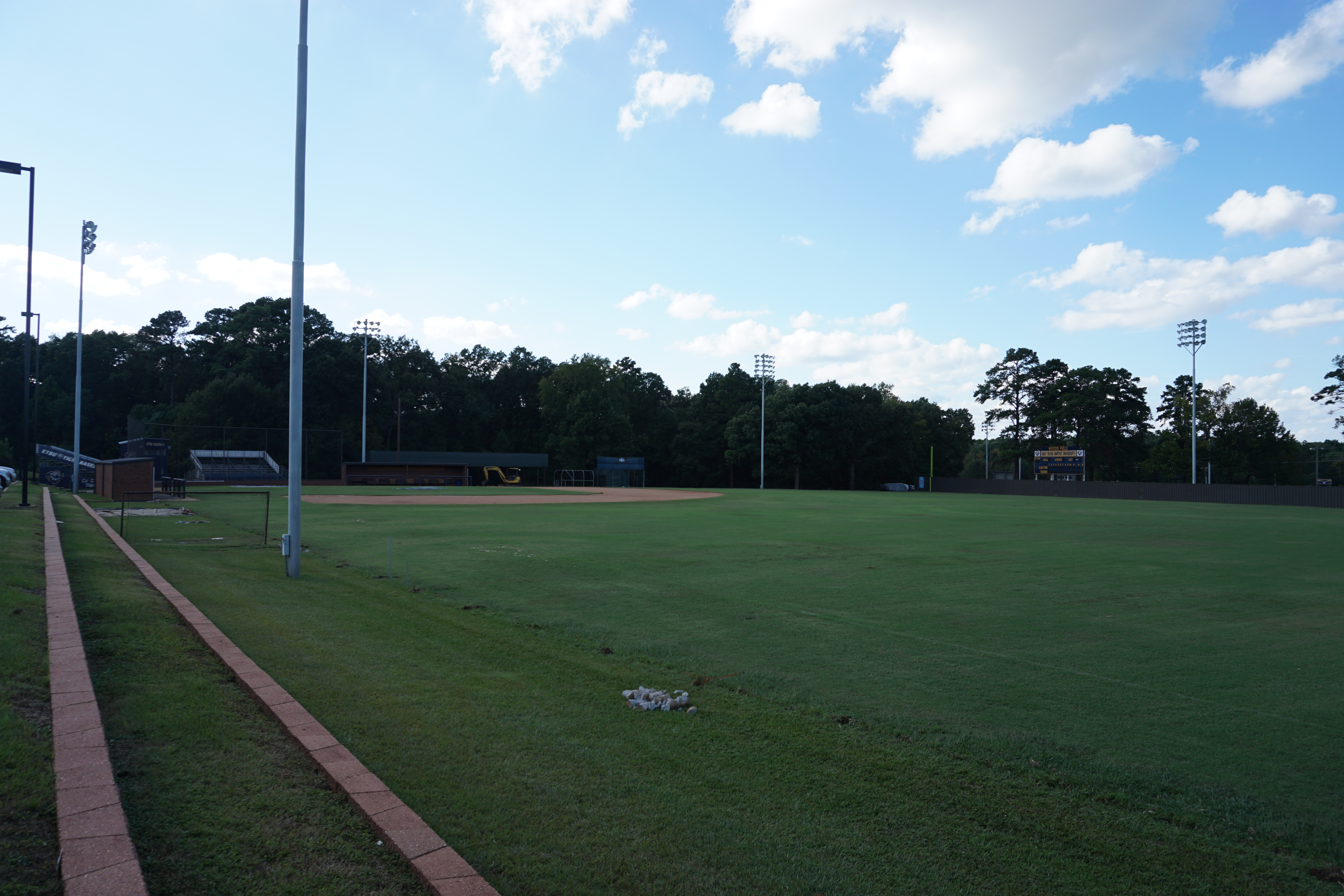
Woods Field, baseball venue

Men's sports	Women's sports
Baseball	Acrobatics and tumbling
Basketball	Basketball
Bass Fishing	Beach volleyball
Cross-country running	Cross-country running
Football	Pom
Golf	Soccer
Ice Hockey	Softball
Lacrosse	Tennis
Soccer	Track and field
Tennis	Volleyball
Track and field	

=== Mascot ===
The mascot for ETBU is a tiger, "Toby" and recently added, "Tabby". ETBU also has a live tiger mascot named "Sarge", that is housed off campus.

== Notable alumni ==
- Chris Dier, author and teacher
- Rick Edmonds, Southern Baptist pastor and politician
- Sam B. Hall, politician and judge
- Cameron McCasland, film and television producer

== Sponsored Christian camps ==
As of 2019, East Texas Baptist sponsored Mission 58 Christian Camps.

== Gallery ==
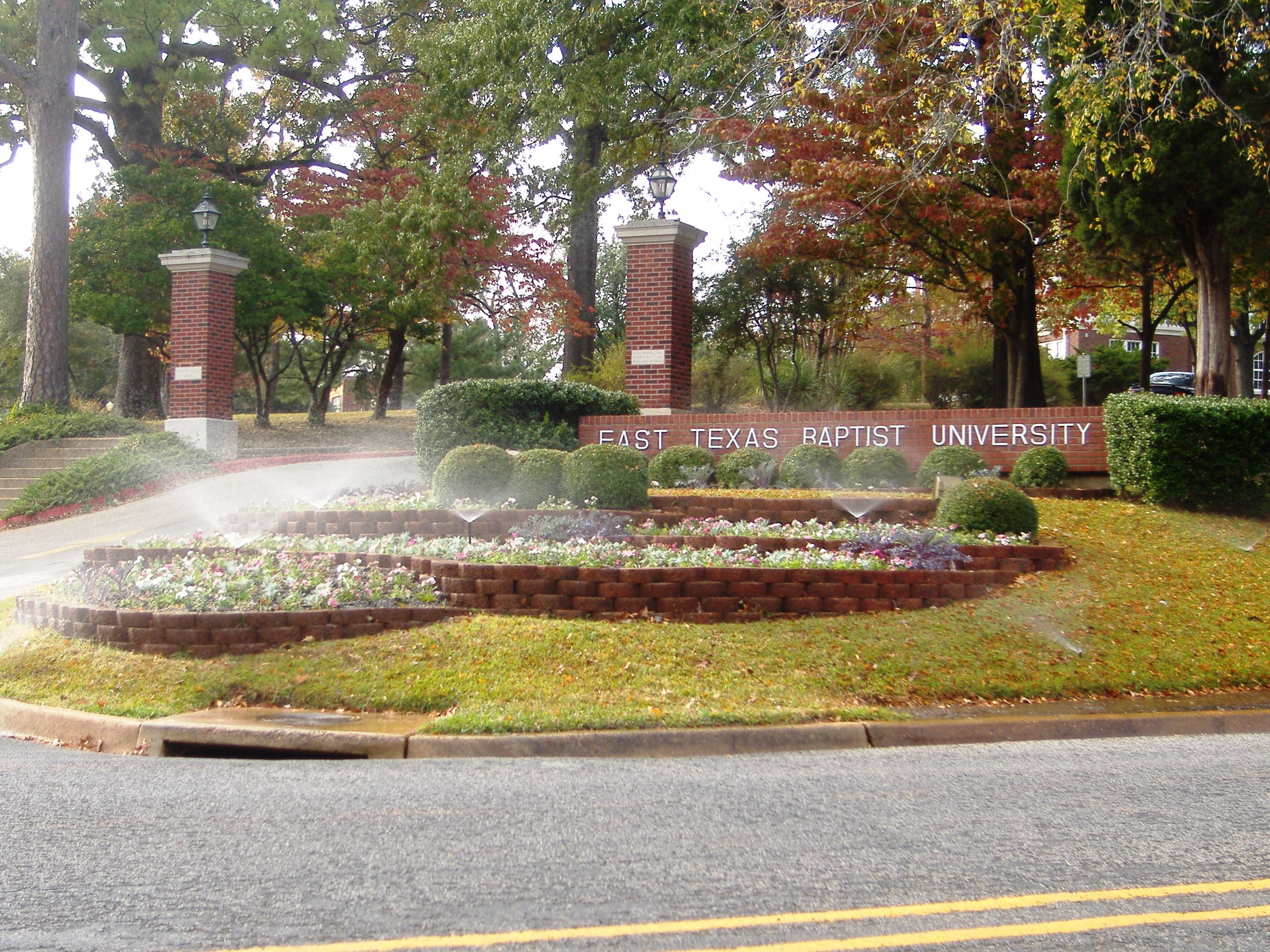
Entrance to ETBU

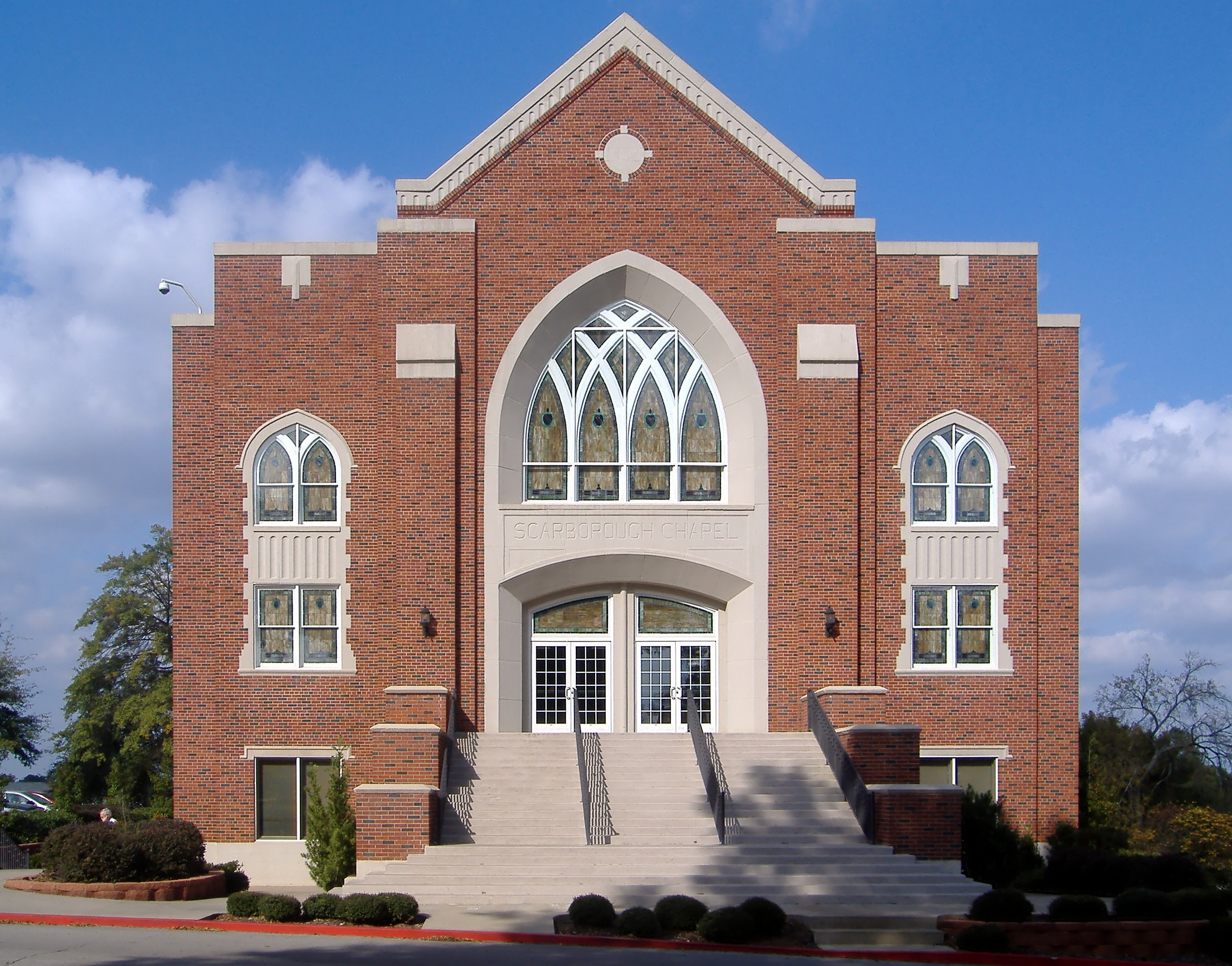
Scarborough Hall, built in 1948

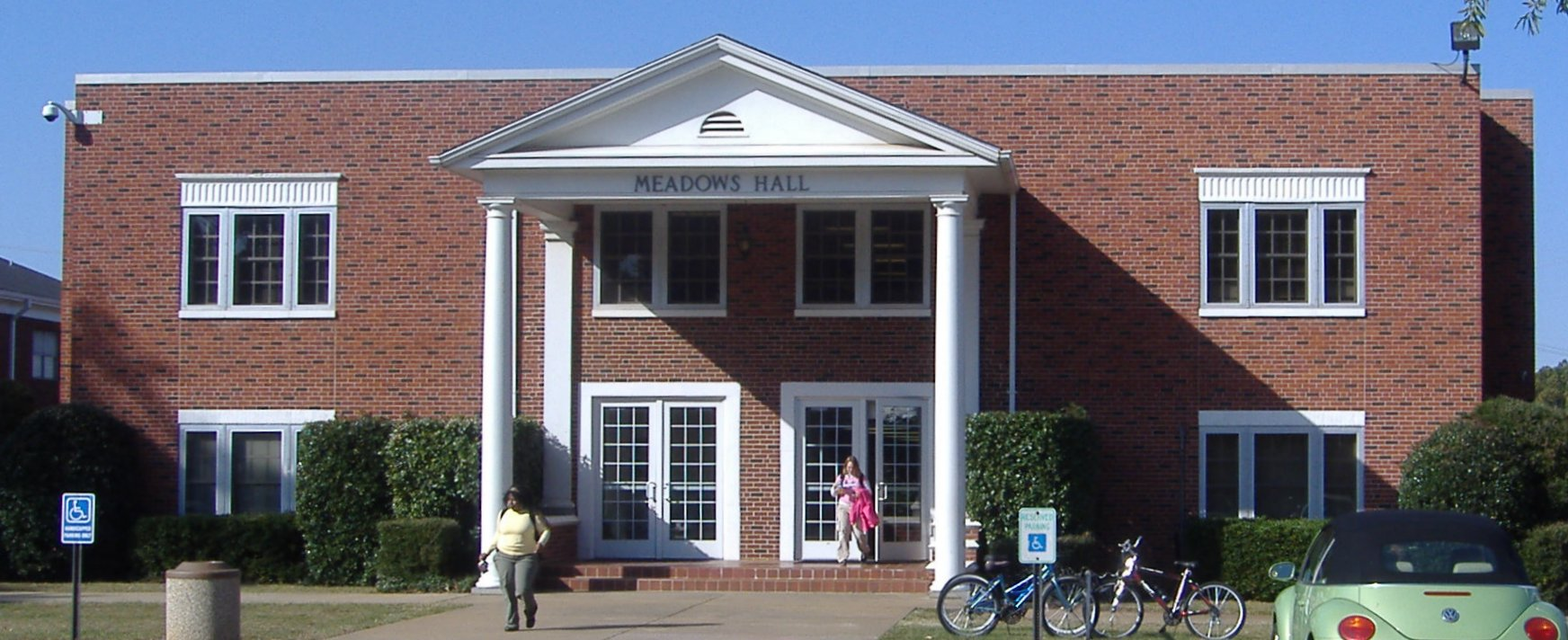
Meadows Hall

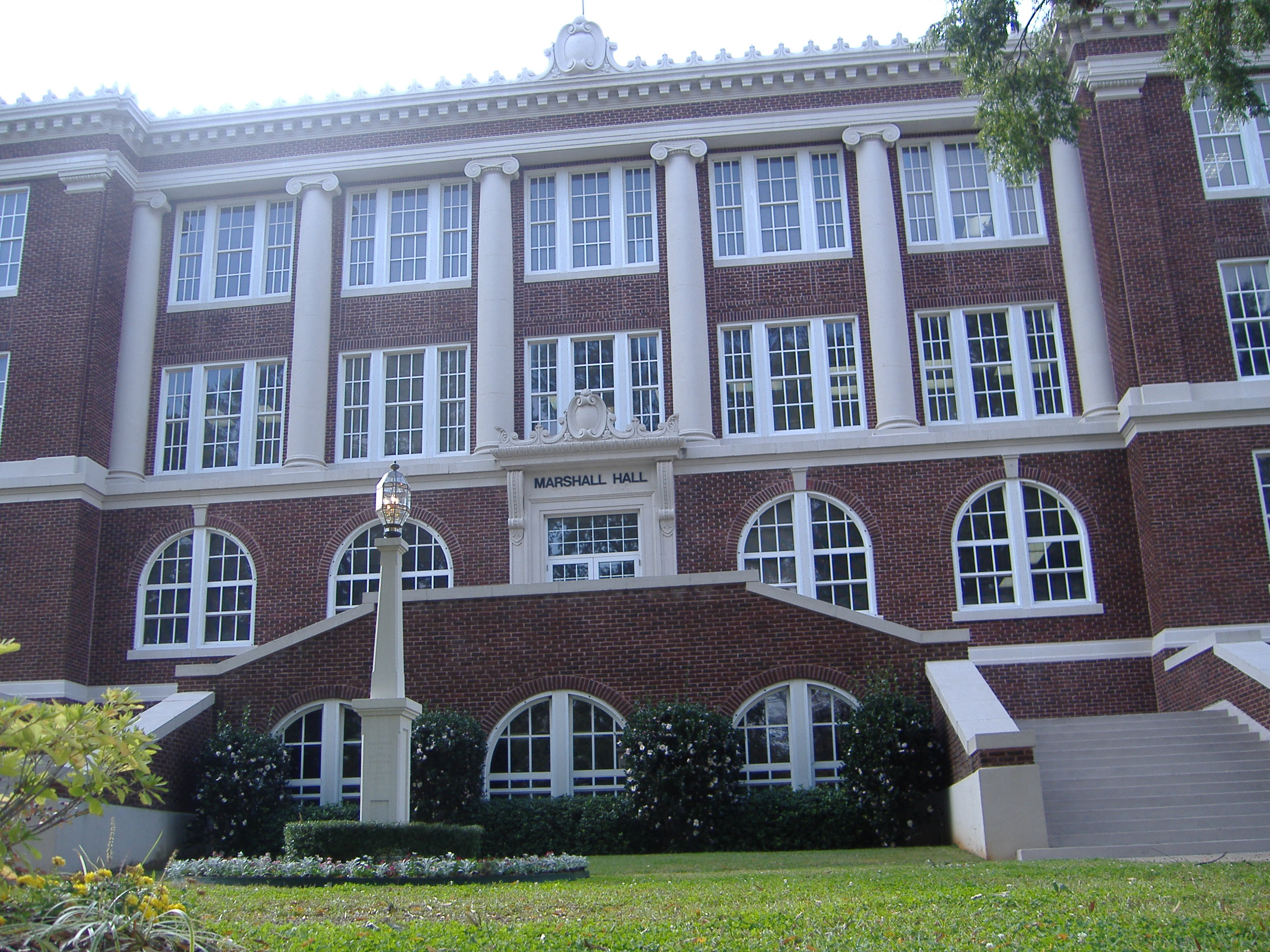
Marshall Hall showing the Light on the Hill

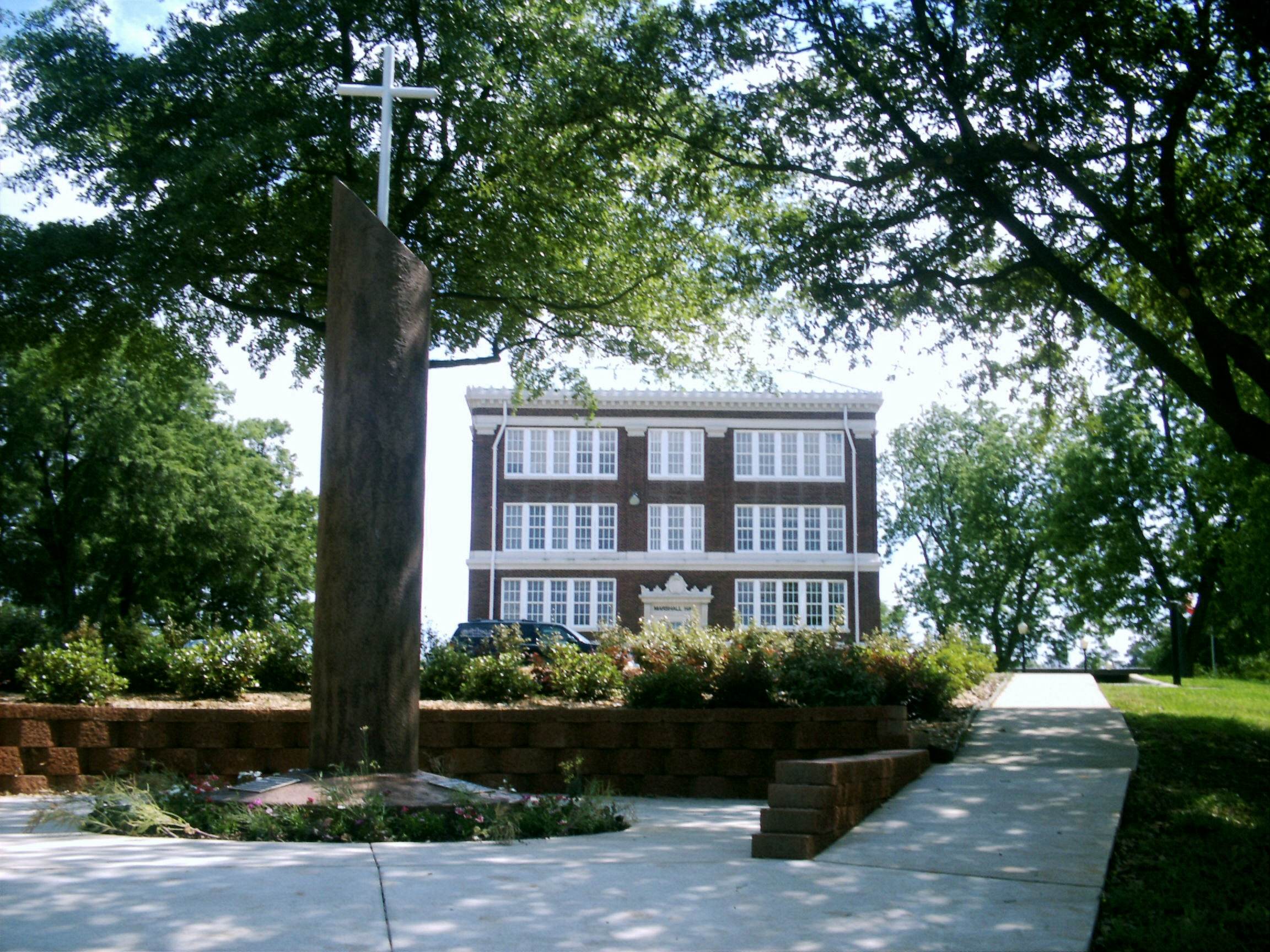
Scarborough Cross and Marshall Hall

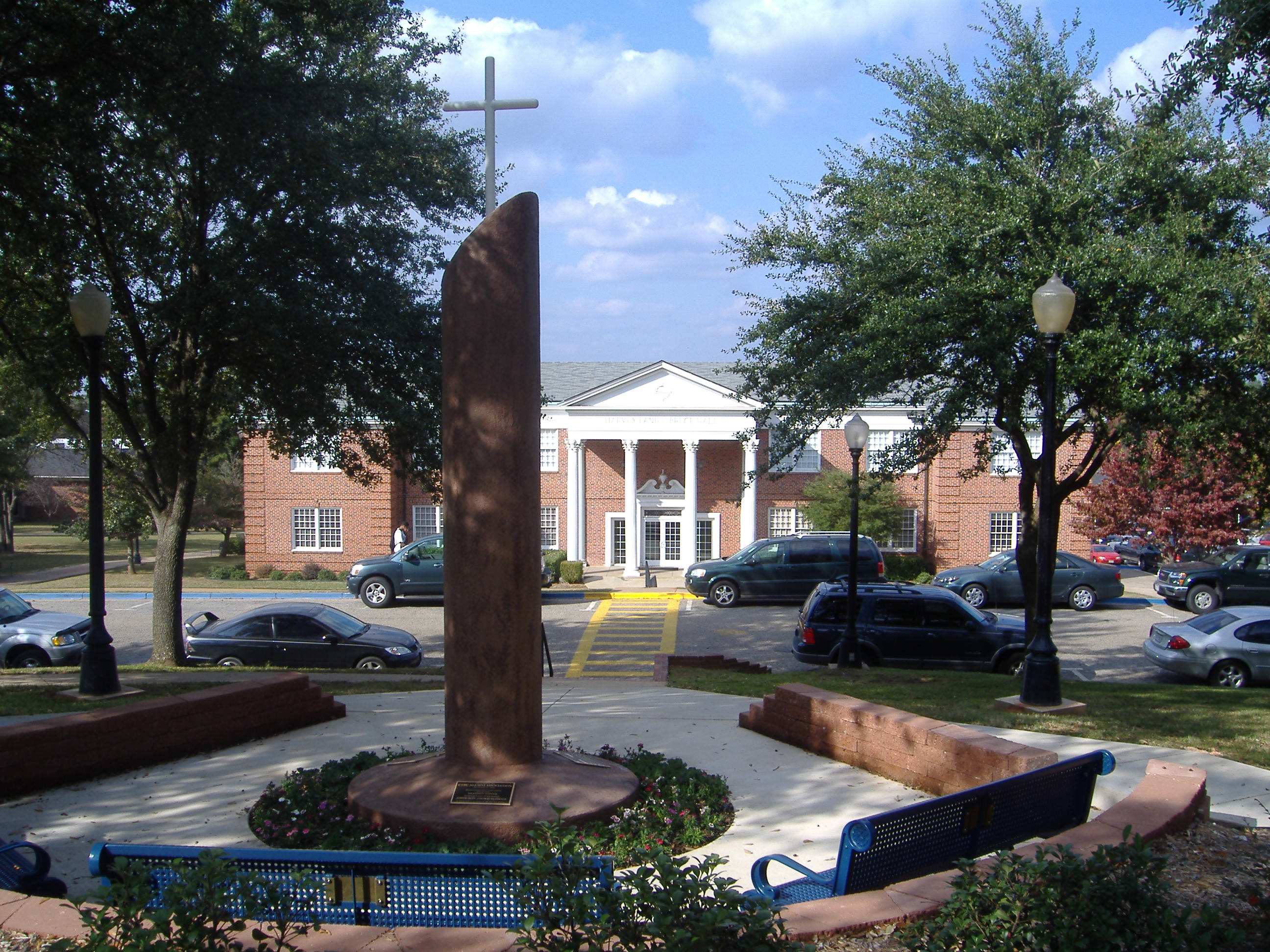
Scarborough Cross and Harvey Daniel Bruce Hall

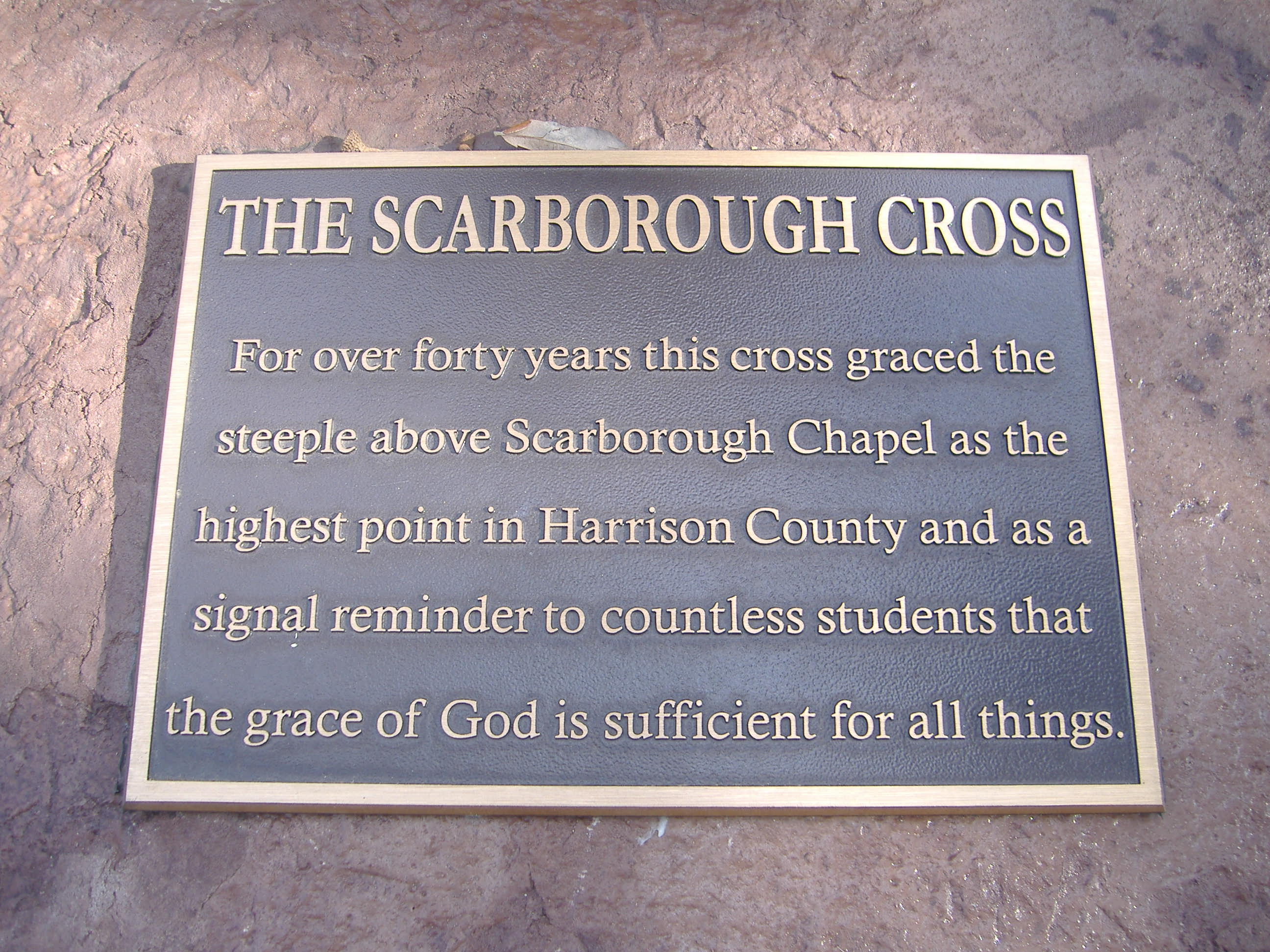
A plate with description under Scarborough Cross

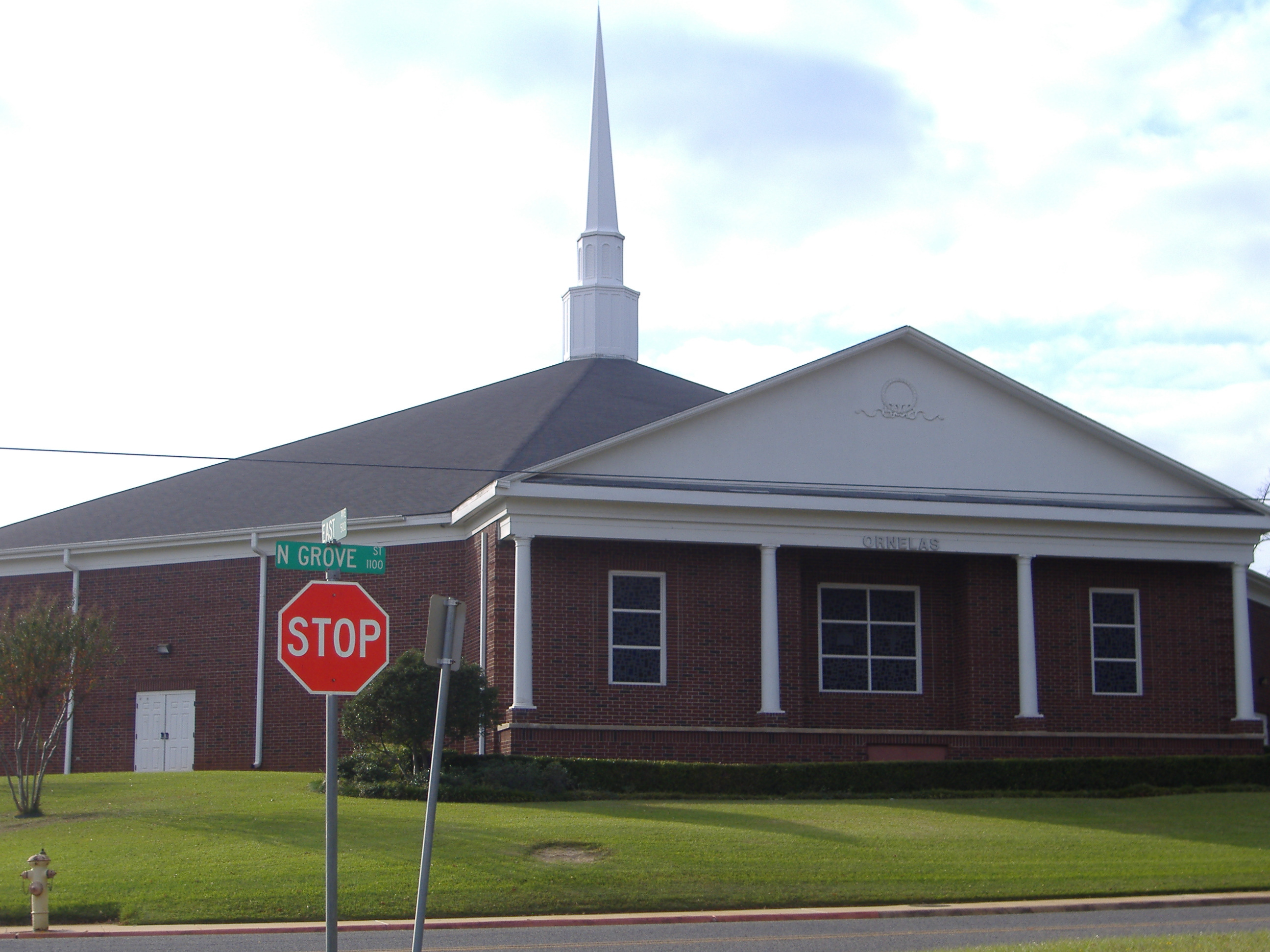
Ornelas Spiritual Life Center

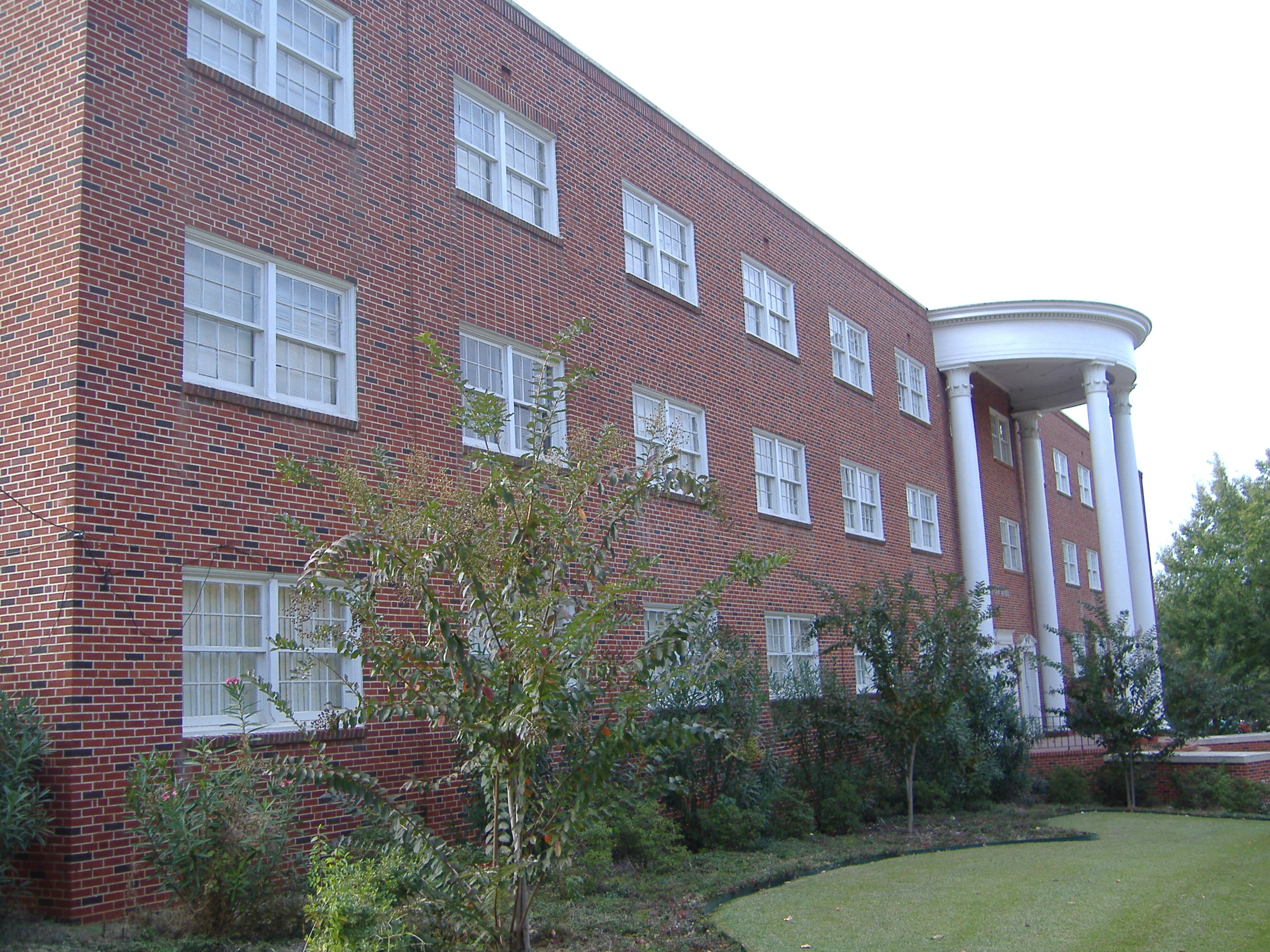
Feagin Hall

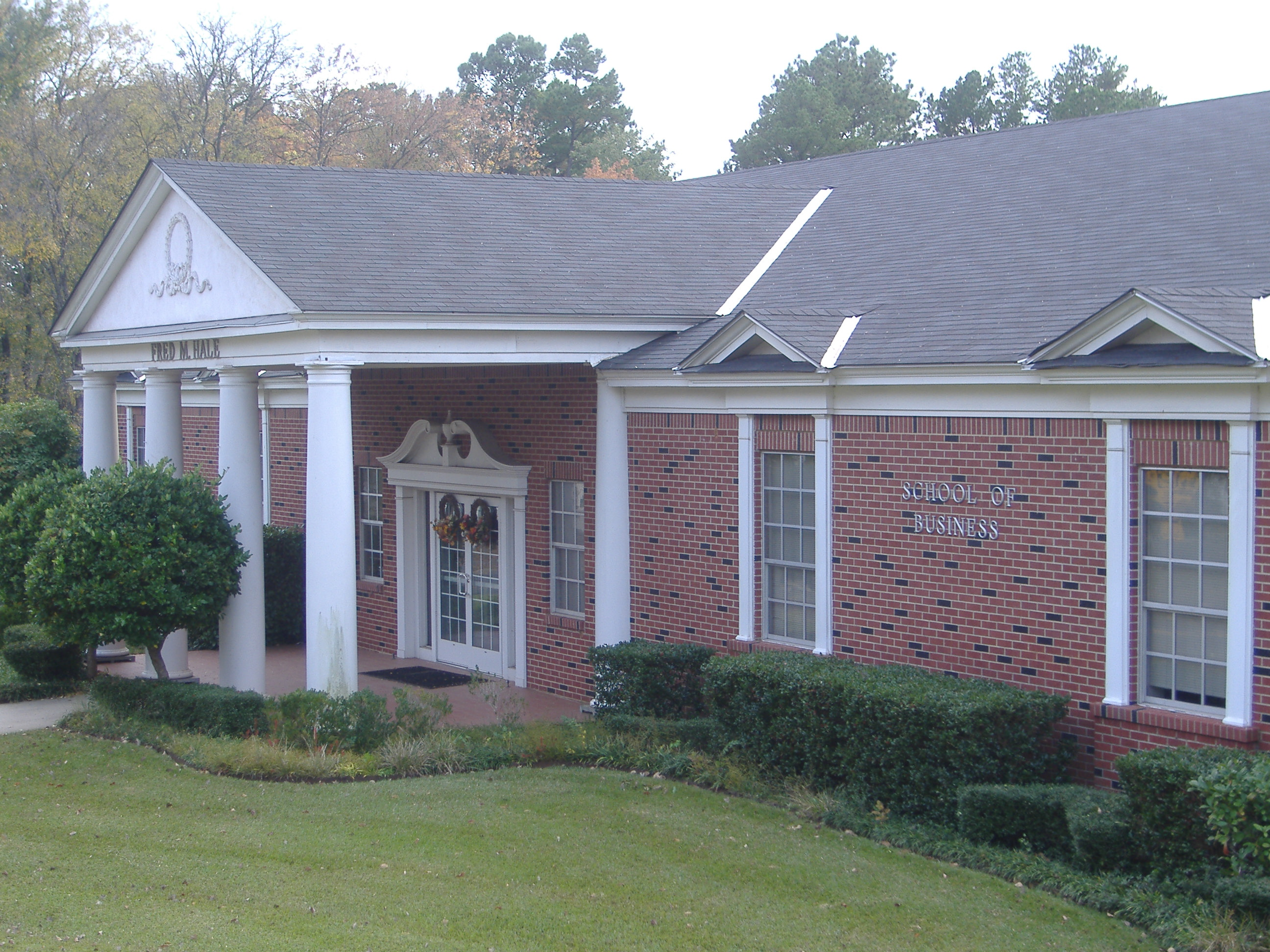
Fred Hale School of Business

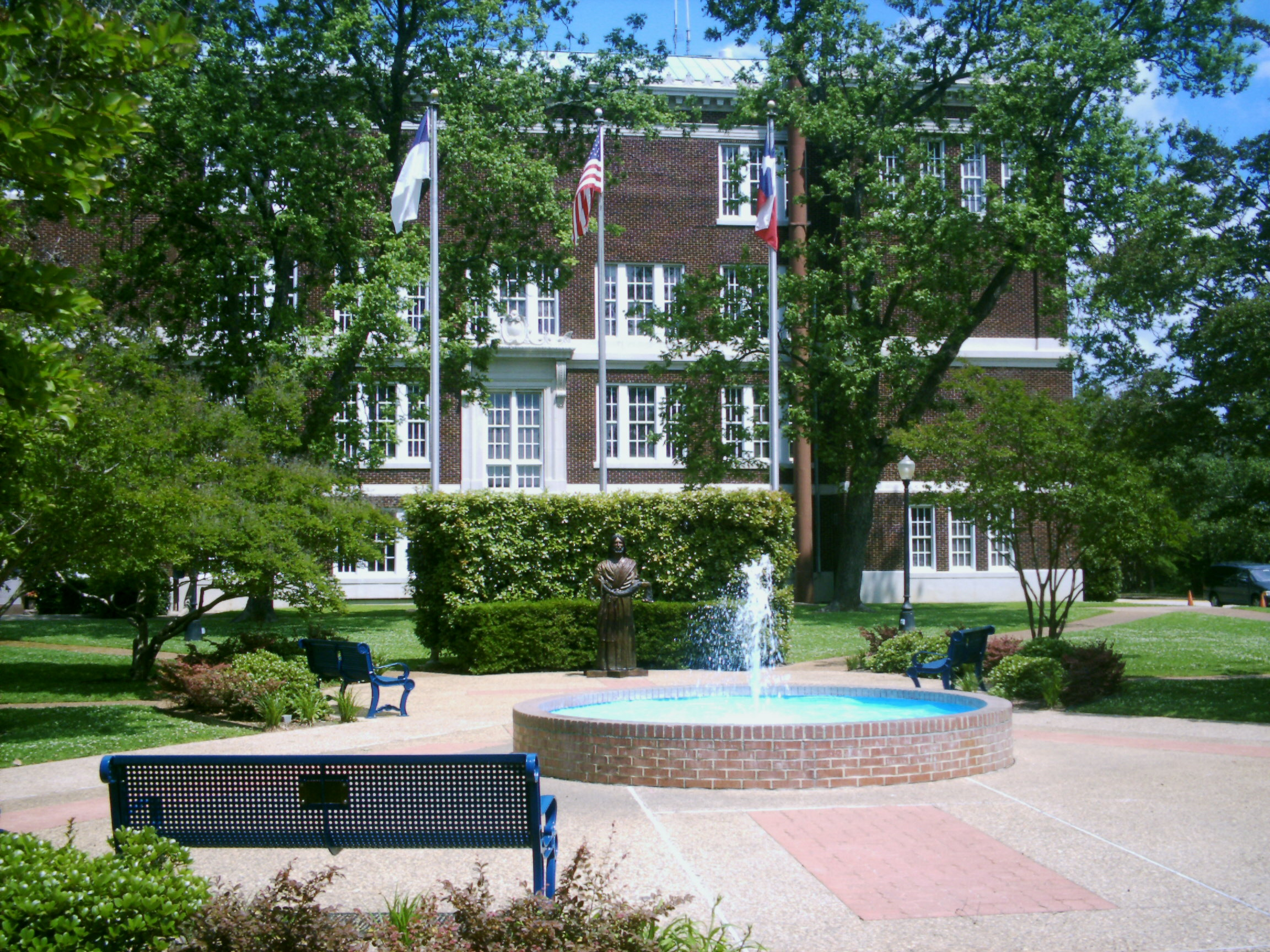
ETBU quad
