= Ithaca Bombers =

Intercollegiate sports teams of Ithaca College

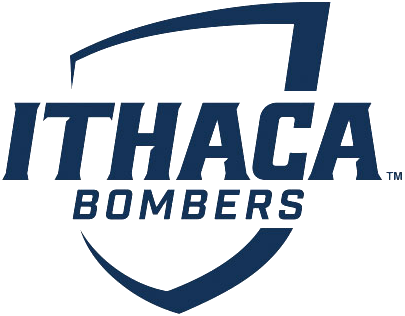
- University: Ithaca College
- NCAA: Division III
- Conference: Liberty League, Eastern College Athletic Conference
- Athletic director: Susan Bassett
- Location: Ithaca, New York
- Varsity teams: 25
- Football stadium: Butterfield Stadium
- Basketball arena: Ben Light Gymnasium
- Baseball stadium: Freeman Field
- Soccer field: Carp Wood Field
- Other venues: Higgins Stadium, Glazer Arena, Bird Natatorium
- Colors: Blue, gray, and gold
- Mascot: Bombers
- Website: athletics.ithaca.edu

Team NCAA championships
- 14

The Ithaca Bombers are composed of 25 teams representing Ithaca College in intercollegiate athletics, including men and women's basketball, soccer, cross country, lacrosse, soccer, swimming & diving, rowing, tennis, track and field, and wrestling. Men's sports include football, baseball, crew, and wrestling. Women's sports include field hockey, golf, gymnastics, volleyball, crew & sculling, and softball. The Ithaca Bombers compete in the NCAA Division III, and are members of the Liberty League and the Eastern College Athletic Conference (ECAC). Ithaca has one of Division III's strongest athletic programs, with the Bombers winning a total of 14 national titles in seven team sports and five individual sports. The Ithaca Bombers were previously a member of the Empire 8.

== Overview ==
The Ithaca athletics nickname "Bombers" is unique in NCAA athletics, and the origins of the nickname are obscure. Ithaca College's sports teams were originally named the Cayugas, but the name was changed to the Bombers sometime in the 1930s. Some other names that have been used for Ithaca College's teams include: Blue Team, Blues, Blue and Gold, Collegians, and the Seneca Streeters. Several possibilities for the change to the "Bombers" have been posited. The most common explanation is that the school's baseball uniforms—white with navy blue pinstripes and an interlocking "IC" on the left chest—bear a striking resemblance to the distinctive home uniforms of the New York Yankees, who are known as the Bronx Bombers. It may also have referred to the Ithaca basketball team of that era and its propensity for half-court "bombs". Grumman Aircraft also manufactured airplanes including bombers in Ithaca for many years.{{Citation needed|date=November 2026}} The first "Bombers" reference on record was in the December 17, 1938 issue of the Rochester Times-Union in a men's basketball article.

The name has at times sparked controversy for its perceived violent connotations. It is an occasional source of umbrage from Ithaca's prominent pacifist community, but the athletics department has consistently stated it has no interest in changing the name. The athletics logo has in the past incorporated World War II era fighter planes, but currently does not, and the school does not currently have a physical mascot to personify the name. In 2010 the school launched a contest to choose one. It received over 250 suggestions and narrowed the field down to three: a phoenix, a flying squirrel, and a Lake Beast. In June 2011, President Rochon announced that the school would discontinue the search due to opposition in the alumni community.

The Kelsey Partridge Bird Natatorium, home of Ithaca's swimming & diving teams, is a 47,000 square foot, 9-lane 50 meter Olympic-size swimming pool. The pool hosted the 2015 Big East Conference Swimming & Diving Championships. Ithaca College remodeled the Hill Center in 2013. The building features hardwood floors (Ben Light Gymnasium) as well as coaches offices. The building is home to Ithaca's men's and women's basketball teams, women's volleyball team, wrestling, and gymnastics. Ithaca also opened the Athletics & Events Center in 2011, a $65.5 million facility funded by donors. The facility is mainly used by the school's varsity athletes. The building also has Glazer Arena, a 130,000 square foot event space. It is a track and field center that doubles as a practice facility for lacrosse, field hockey, soccer, baseball, tennis, and football. The facility was designed by the architectural firm Moody Nolan and began construction in June 2009.

== Sponsored sports ==
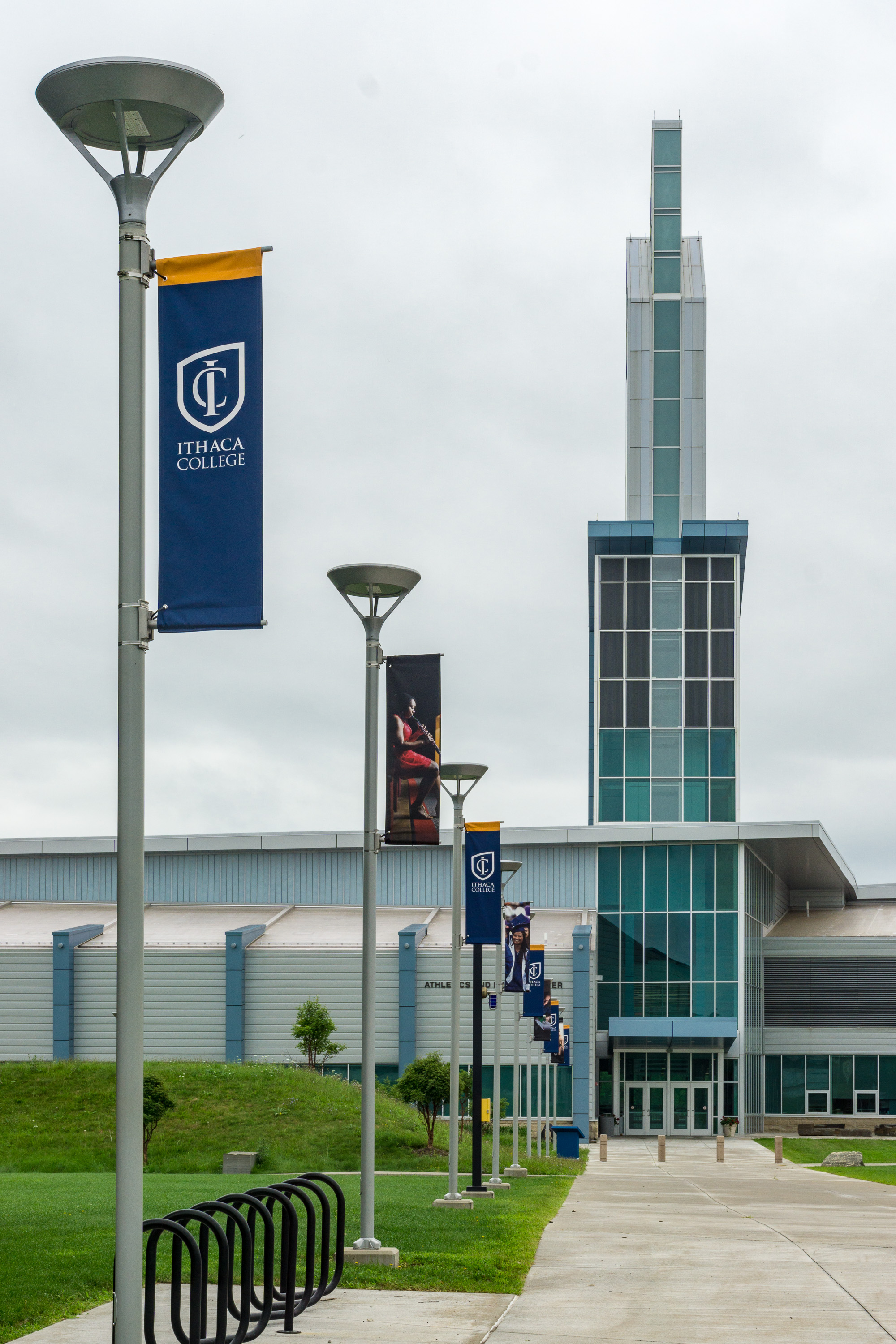
Athletics and Events Center

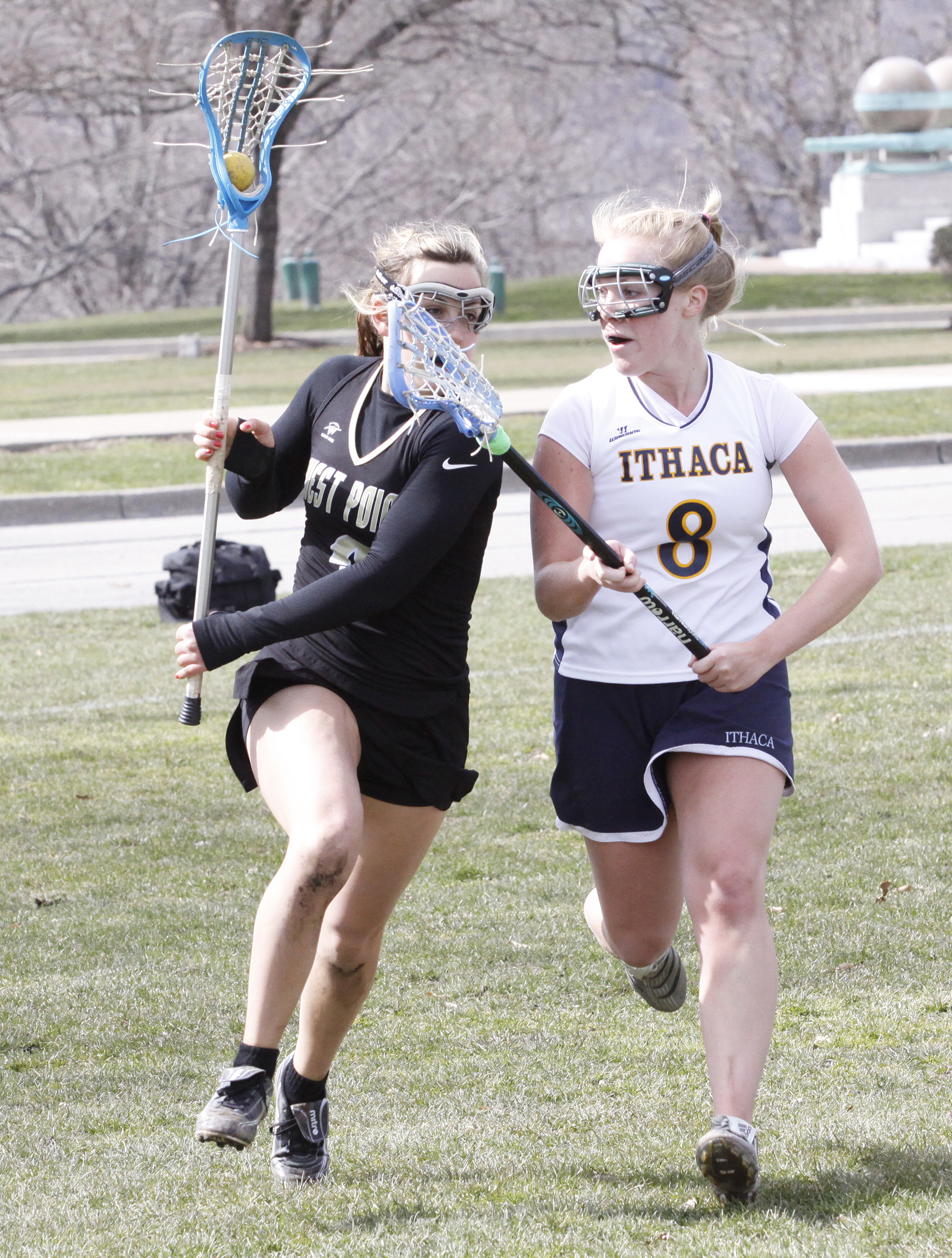
A women's lacrosse game between the Ithaca Bombers and Army Black Knights in 2011

Men's sports	Women's sports
Baseball	Basketball
Basketball	Sculling
Cross Country	Cross Country
Football	Field Hockey
Lacrosse	Golf
Soccer	Gymnastics
Swimming & Diving	Lacrosse
Tennis	Soccer
Track & Field	Softball
Rowing	Swimming & Diving
Wrestling	Rowing
Tennis	Track and Field
	Volleyball
	Wrestling

=== Baseball ===
Ithaca College has had 3 Major League Baseball draft selections since the draft began in 1965.

Year	Player	Round	Team
1985	Chris Rauth	17	Mets
2012	Tucker Healy	23	Athletics
2013	Tim Locastro	13	Blue Jays

=== Field hockey ===
Women's field hockey won the 1982 NCAA Division III Field Hockey Championship.

=== Football ===
Coached by Jim Butterfield for 27 years, the football team has won three NCAA Division III Football Championships in 1979, 1988 and 1991 (a total surpassed only by Augustana (IL), Mount Union and the Wisconsin–Whitewater). Bomber football teams made a record seven appearances in the Division III national championship game, the Amos Alonzo Stagg Bowl, which has since been surpassed by Mount Union in 2003. The Bombers play the SUNY Cortland Red Dragons for the Cortaca Jug, which was added in 1959 to an already competitive rivalry. The match-up is one of the most prominent in Division III college football.

=== Gymnastics ===
Gymnastics won the NCAA Division III national championships in 1998.

=== Crew ===
The men's and women's crew programs are housed in the Robert B. Tallman Rowing Center, a $2.6 million boathouse dedicated in 2012. The new boathouse replaced the Haskell Davidson Boathouse, which was constructed in 1974 on Cayuga Inlet. The old boathouse was razed to make room for the new facility. At 8,500 square feet, the Tallman boathouse is almost twice the size of the previous structure.
