= List of Ithaca Bombers head football coaches =

The Ithaca Bombers football program is a college football team that represents Ithaca College as a member of the Empire 8 at the NCAA Division III lebel The team has had 10 full-time head coaches since the inception of the program in 1930. The current coach is Michael Toerper who took the position for the 2022 season.

== Key ==
Key to symbols in coaches list
General		Overall		Conference		Postseason (Note: Although the first Rose Bowl Game was played in 1902, it has been continuously played since the 1916 game, and is recognized as the oldest bowl game by the NCAA. "—" indicates any season prior to 1916 when postseason games were not played.)	
No.	Order of coaches (Note: A running total of the number of head coaches, with coaches who served separate tenures being counted only once. Interim head coaches are represented with "Int" and are not counted in the running total. "—" indicates the team played but either without a coach or no coach is on record. "X" indicates an interim year without play.)	GC	Games coached	CW	Conference wins	PW	Postseason wins
DC	Division championships	OW	Overall wins	CL	Conference losses	PL	Postseason losses
CC	Conference championships	OL	Overall losses	CT	Conference ties	PT	Postseason ties
NC	National championships	OT	Overall ties (Note: Overtime rules in college football were introduced in 1996, making ties impossible in the period since.)	C%	Conference winning percentage		
†	Elected to the College Football Hall of Fame	O%	Overall winning percentage (Note: When computing the win–loss percentage, a tie counts as half a win and half a loss.)				

== Coaches ==
Statistics correct as of the end of the 2024 college football season.

No.	Name	Term	GC	OW	OL	OT	O%	CW	CL	CT	C%	PW	PL	CCs	NCs	Awards
1	Leonard Schreck	1930	5	1	3	1	.300	—	—	—		—	—	—	—	
2	Bucky Freeman	1931–1942, 1946	74	36	32	6	.527	—	—	—		—	—	—	—	Inducted into the American Baseball Coaches Association Hall of Fame.
Int.	Ben Light	1935	6	4	1	1	.750	—	—	—		—	—	—	—	
X	No team	1943–1945	—	—	—	—	—	—	—	—		—	—	—	—	
3	Pete Hatch	1946–1950	31	13	18	0	.419	—	—	—		—	—	—	—	
4	Joseph Hamilton	1951–1955	32	7	22	3	.266	—	—	—		—	—	—	—	
5	Art Orloske	1956–1957	13	3	10	0	.231	—	—	—		—	—	—	—	
6	Richard S. Lyon	1958–1966	69	49	20	0	.710	—	—	—		—	—	—	—	
7	Jim Butterfield^{†}	1967–1993	278	206	71	1	.743	46	7	1	.861	21	8	11	3	
8	Mike Welch	1994–2016	247	169	78	0	.684	62	31	0	.667	7	10	9	—	
9	Dan Swanstrom	2017–2021	43	32	11	0	.744	17	4	0	.810	1	2	3	—	
10	Michael Toerper	2022–2025	45	35	10	0	.778	23	2	0	.920	3	2	2	—	
