= 2024 Cornell Big Red football team =

American college football season

2024 Cornell Big Red football

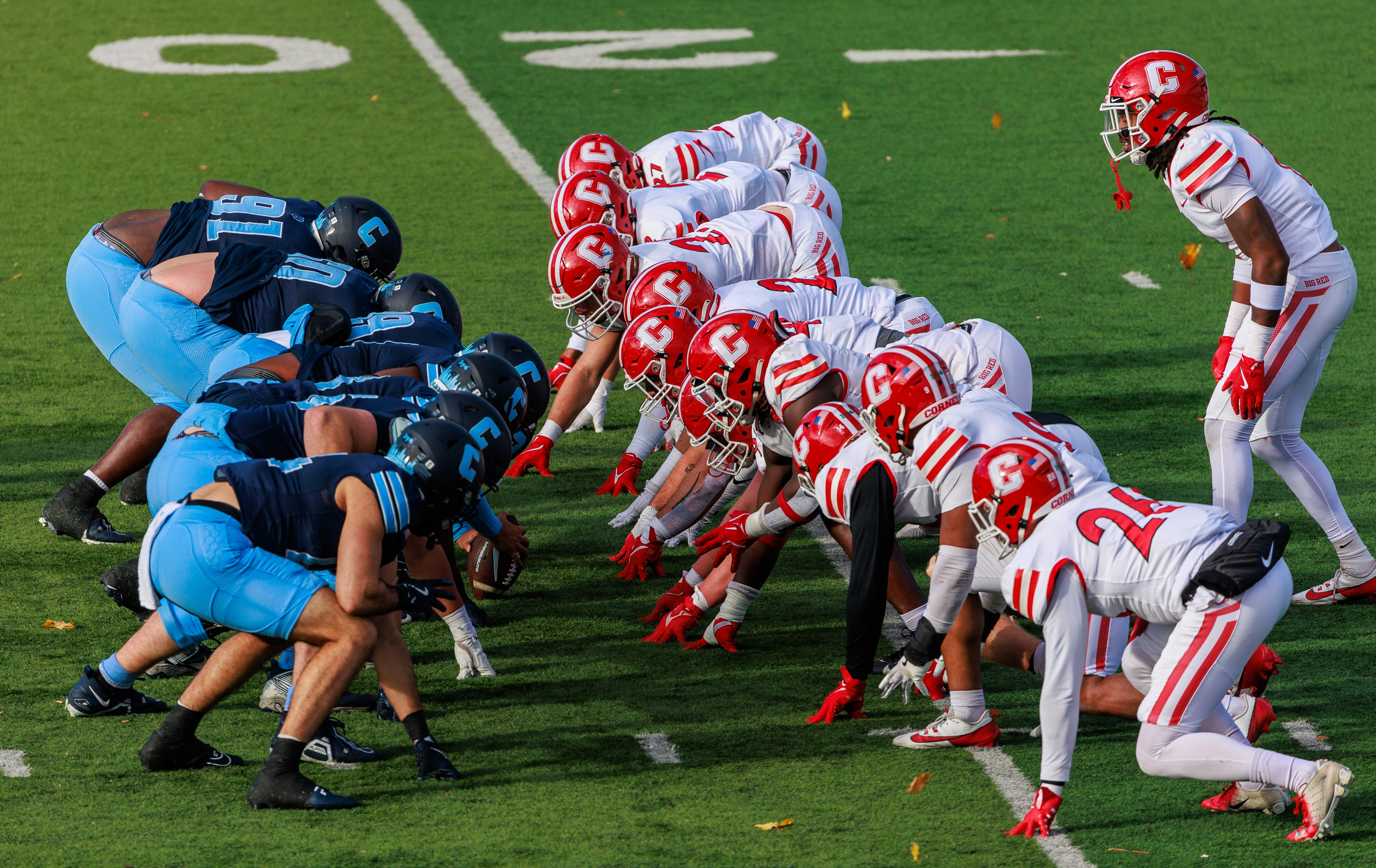
- Cornell lost to Columbia, 9–17
- Conference: Ivy League
- Record: 4–6 (3–4 Ivy)
- Head coach: Dan Swanstrom (1st season)
- Co-offensive coordinators: Mike Hatcher (1st season); Sean Reeder (1st season)
- Offensive scheme: No-huddle spread option
- Defensive coordinator: Jared Backus (11th season)
- Base defense: Multiple
- Home stadium: Schoellkopf Field

Uniform
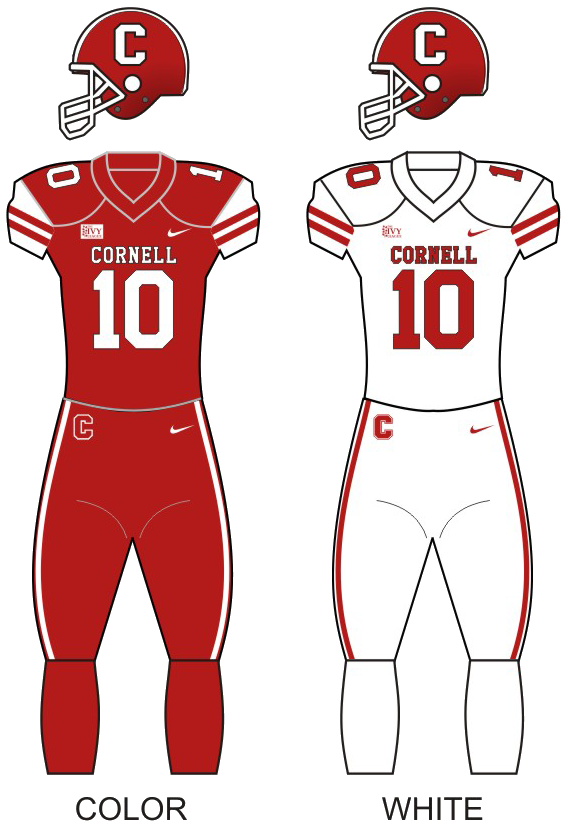

2024 Ivy League football standings
	Conf.			Overall
Team	W		L	W		L
Dartmouth +	5	–	2	8	–	2
No. 25 Harvard +	5	–	2	8	–	2
Columbia +	5	–	2	7	–	3
Yale	4	–	3	7	–	3
Cornell	3	–	4	4	–	6
Penn	2	–	5	4	–	6
Brown	2	–	5	3	–	7
Princeton	2	–	5	3	–	7
+ – Conference co-champions; Rankings from STATS Poll

The 2024 Cornell Big Red football team represented Cornell University as a member of the Ivy League during the 2024 NCAA Division I FCS football season. The team was led by first-year head coach Dan Swanstrom and played its home games at Schoellkopf Field in Ithaca, New York.

The Cornell Big Red improved on the 2023 season's 3–7 overall, and 2–5 Ivy League finish, concluding the season 4–6 overall, and 3–4 in Ivy League competition, to place tied for fourth of eight in the conference. After opening the Ivy League portion of the schedule with an upset win against pre-season Ivy League favorite Yale on September 28 and a Friday night loss against Harvard on October 11, the Big Red alternated wins and losses for the remainder of the season, including a second upset victory against first place Dartmouth.

== Offseason and preseason ==
=== Coaching changes ===
In the 2023 season, Cornell finished 3–7 overall and 2–5 in conference play. After the conclusion of the season, Cornell University's athletics director, Nicki Moore, announced that ten-year head coach David Archer would not return for the 2024 season. Defensive coordinator Jared Backus assumed duties as interim head coach, with immediate effect. At Cornell, Archer compiled a record of 29–71, and the team was not able to record a winning season during that span, a streak existing since the 2006 season. On December 7, 2023, Cornell University Athletics announced the hiring of Dan Swanstrom as head coach to succeed Archer.

In January 2024, Swanstrom announced five additions to the coaching staff: Jeff Dittman (of Rensselaer Polytechnic) as special teams coordinator and defensive assistant coach, Eric Franklin (of Penn) as defensive backs and cornerbacks coach and passing game coordinator, Mike Hatcher (of Ithaca College, where he served as an assistant to Swanstrom), Sean Reeder (of Penn) as offensive line coach, and Terry Ursin (of Jesuit High School of New Orleans) as running backs coach. Swanstrom later named Hatcher and Reeder as co-offensive coordinators in September 2024. Unlike in past years, the 2024 Cornell team did not designate player captains prior to the season, instead designating game captains each week during the season.

=== Ivy League media poll ===
The Ivy League preseason poll was released on August 5, 2024. The Big Red were predicted to finish seventh in the conference.

== Schedule ==
The Cornell Big Red's 2024 football schedule consists of five away and five home games. Cornell will host Ivy League opponents Yale, Harvard, Penn, and Dartmouth, and will travel to Brown, Princeton, and Columbia. Cornell's non-conference opponents will be rival Colgate of the Patriot League, Albany of the Coastal Athletic Association Football Conference, and Bucknell, also of the Patriot League. Homecoming will coincide with the Big Red's home opener against Yale on September 28.

Date	Time	Opponent	Site	TV	Result	Attendance
September 21	1:00 p.m.	at Colgate*	Andy Kerr Stadium; Hamilton, NY (rivalry)	ESPN+	L 24–41	2,984
September 28	2:00 p.m.	Yale^{†}	Schoellkopf Field; Ithaca, NY	ESPN+	W 47–23	12,444
October 5	1:00 p.m.	Albany*	Schoellkopf Field; Ithaca, NY	ESPN+	L 10–31	4,827
October 11	6:00 p.m.	Harvard	Schoellkopf Field; Ithaca, NY	ESPNU	L 20–38	5,642
October 19	1:00 p.m.	at Bucknell*	Christy Mathewson–Memorial Stadium; Lewisburg, PA	ESPN+	W 34–21	1,245
October 26	12:00 p.m.	at Brown	Richard Gouse Field at Brown Stadium; Providence, RI	ESPN+	L 21–23	7,327
November 2	1:00 p.m.	at Princeton	Powers Field at Princeton Stadium; Princeton, NJ	ESPN+	W 49–35	7,626
November 9	1:00 p.m.	Penn	Schoellkopf Field; Ithaca, NY (rivalry)	ESPN+	L 49–67	2,466
November 16	1:00 p.m.	Dartmouth	Schoellkopf Field; Ithaca, NY (rivalry)	ESPN+	W 39–22	4,212
November 23	12:00 p.m.	at Columbia	Robert K. Kraft Field at Lawrence A. Wien Stadium; New York, NY (rivalry)	ESPN+	L 9–17	4,224
*Non-conference game; ^{†}Homecoming; All times are in Eastern time

== Game summaries ==
=== At Colgate ===
Team	1	2	3	4	Total
Cornell	10	7	0	7	24
• Colgate	10	17	7	7	41

- Date: September 21, 2024
- Location: Andy Kerr Stadium, Hamilton, New York
- Game start: 1:00 p.m. EST
- Game attendance: 2,984
- Game weather: Sunny; 74°F; wind 6 mph S
- Referee: P. Overton

The Big Red traveled to Colgate University in Hamilton, New York, for its season opener on Saturday, September 21. The Raiders defeated the Big Red, 41–24. Cornell scored first, concluding the first series of the game and the season with a 32-yard field goal by Alan Zhao. Colgate later tied the game, 3–3, with a 40-yard field goal also in the first quarter. On its next possession, Cornell recorded its first touchdown of the season, a 10-yard pass from Jameson Wang to Samuel Musungu. Colgate again tied the game, concluding first quarter scoring with a 27-yard touchdown pass from Jake Stearney to Brady Hutchison. The Big Red broke the 10–10 tie less than 30 seconds into the second quarter, with a touchdown on a 2-yard pass from Wang to Parker Woodring, to take a 17–10 lead. Cornell would not score again until the fourth quarter, however, and Colgate thereafter scored 24 unanswered points. Touchdown runs of 44 yards and 1 yard by quarterback Michael Brescia, and a 22-yard field goal in the second quarter, gave Colgate a 27–17 halftime lead. The Raiders expanded the lead to 34–17 heading into the fourth quarter, with a 10-yard Winston Moore touchdown run late in the third. The Big Red's final points of the game resulted from a 1-yard touchdown pass from Wang to Johntu Reed with 2:36 remaining. Colgate scored once more to conclude the game, a 6-yard touchdown run to secure the victory for the Raiders.

The Raiders outgained the Big Red in total offense, 457 yards to 402 yards. The only turnover of the game was an interception by Cornell defensive back Johnny Williamson. Jameson Wang was successful in 29 of 37 passing attempts, for 313 yards and three touchdowns. Wang also led the Big Red in rushing, accumulating 41 yards in 10 carries. Brendan Lee was the Big Red receiving leader, accumulating 89 yards in four catches.

=== Yale ===
Team	1	2	3	4	Total
Yale	7	7	9	0	23
• Cornell	13	14	6	14	47

- Date: September 28, 2024
- Location: Schoellkopf Field, Ithaca, New York
- Game start: 2:03 p.m. EST
- Elapsed time: 3:10
- Game attendance: 12,444
- Game weather: Cloudy; 72°F; wind 7 mph NW
- Referee: A. Parrella

Cornell returned home to Schoellkopf Field in Ithaca, New York on Saturday, September 28, for its Ivy League opener and homecoming game against Yale University. The Big Red defeated the Bulldogs, 47–23. Cornell opened scoring, with a 34-yard touchdown pass from Jameson Wang to Brendan Lee in the first quarter. Yale tied the score with an 8-yard touchdown pass of its own later in the first before the Big Red added two field goals to take a 13–7 lead into the second. Alan Zhao kicked both, from 24 and 34 yards. Early in the second quarter Yale took a one-point lead, with a 9-yard touchdown run. Yale did not score again in the first half, however, and Cornell recorded two additional touchdowns on long plays—a 39-yard pass, again from Wang to Lee, and a 37-yard Ean Pope rush—to take a 27–14 lead into halftime.

In the second half, the Big Red outscored the Bulldogs 20–9. Yale scored first in the second half, a 24-yard field goal to narrow the deficit to ten points. On its next possession, Cornell scored on a 68-yard touchdown pass from Wang to Ryder Kurtz concluding a three-play, 75-yard drive to expand the lead to seventeen (the point after attempt was unsuccessful). Yale once more closed the gap to ten, with a 1-yard touchdown rush (Yale's point after attempt was also unsuccessful). The touchdown was the last Yale points of the game, however, and Cornell scored two additional touchdowns in the fourth quarter to assume a 47–23 lead and secure Dan Swanstrom's first win as Cornell's head coach, and the first win of the new season. The victory was also Swanstrom's first at the Division I level. With the win over the reigning Ivy League co-champion and pre-season favorite (its second successive win over Yale), Cornell improved to 1–1 on the season, and 1–0 in Ivy League competition.

Jameson Wang was successful in 18 of 29 passing attempts, for 278 yards, four touchdowns, and no interceptions. Ean Pope was the leading rusher for the Big Red, recording 72 yards and one touchdown on 11 carries. Cornell's leading receiver was Brendan Lee, with 99 yards and two touchdowns on five catches. The Big Red offense outgained the Bulldogs offense, 475 yards to 302 yards. There were four turnovers in the game, three by Yale and one by Cornell.

=== Albany ===
Team	1	2	3	4	Total
• Albany	3	3	10	15	31
Cornell	0	7	3	0	10

- Date: October 5, 2024
- Location: Schoellkopf Field, Ithaca, New York
- Game start: 1:02 p.m. EST
- Elapsed time: 3:07
- Game attendance: 4,827
- Game weather: Sunny; 63°F; wind 7 mph NW
- Referee: T. Boyd

In the second game of a three-game homestand, on Saturday, October 5, Cornell hosted the University at Albany, SUNY of the CAA. The Albany Great Danes defeated the Big Red, 31–10. Albany recorded the only points of the first quarter, a 37-yard field goal capping its first possession of the game. Cornell was forced to punt on its first two possessions, while the Great Danes missed a field goal on their second possession and kicked an 18-yard field goal to take a 6–0 lead. Cornell took a one-point lead late in the second quarter, scoring a touchdown on a four-yard pass from Jameson Wang to Parker Woodring at the conclusion of an 8-play, 75-yard drive. The Big Red retained its one-point lead into halftime. Cornell again punted on its first possession of the second half. Albany scored quickly in its own first possession of the half, a 52-yard touchdown pass, to retake a 13–7 lead. On its ensuing possession, Cornell's Alan Zhao kicked a 35-yard field goal to narrow the deficit to 13–10. Albany extended the lead back to six on its next possession, however, kicking a 43-yard field goal of its own. The Zhao field goal was the last points for Cornell in the game, and Albany extended its lead to 24–10 on a 16-yard touchdown run and again to 31–10 on an 84-yard touchdown run, both late in the fourth quarter. Cornell's record fell to 1–2 (1–0 Ivy League) as a result of the defeat.

The Albany Great Danes recorded 498 yards of offense in total, to the Cornell Big Red's 310. The only turnover of the game was a Cornell fumble resulting from a strip sack of Devin Page late in the fourth quarter, on Cornell's final possession. Jameson Wang completed 22 of 31 passing attempts for 187 yards and one touchdown. Johntu Reed was the Big Red's leading rusher, carrying three times for 36 yards. Samuel Musungu led the Big Red in receiving, with six catches totalling 87 yards.

=== Harvard ===
Team	1	2	3	4	Total
• Harvard	10	21	7	0	38
Cornell	7	7	6	0	20

- Date: October 11, 2024
- Location: Schoellkopf Field, Ithaca, New York
- Game start: 6:03 p.m. EST
- Elapsed time: 2:54
- Game attendance: 5,642
- Game weather: Sunny; 62°F; wind 5 mph SW
- Referee: C. Hanson

Cornell hosted Ivy League opponent Harvard University in the final match of its initial three game homestand. The Harvard Crimson defeated the Big Red, 38–20. Cornell opened scoring in the match, a 4-yard touchdown pass from Jameson Wang to Ryder Kurtz in its first possession. Later in the first quarter, Harvard narrowed the Big Red's lead to 7–3, with a 28-yard field goal, and took a 10–7 lead with a 21-yard touchdown pass of its own. Cornell retook the lead in the second quarter, with a 10-yard Jameson Wang touchdown run, though the 14–10 lead was the Big Red's last of the game. The Crimson scored three more times in the second quarter: three touchdown passes of 54 yards, 20 yards, and 19 yards to take a 31–14 lead into halftime. Harvard scored the first points of the second half, a two-yard touchdown pass after the Big Red and Crimson exchanged scoreless possessions to begin the third quarter. Cornell recorded the final points of the game, a 5-yard touchdown pass from Wang to Samuel Musungu late in the third quarter, followed by an unsuccessful two-point conversion attempt. Neither team scored again and, with a scoreless fourth quarter, Harvard secured the 38–20 victory over Cornell. The defeat rendered Cornell 1–3 overall, and 1–1 in the Ivy League.

The Cornell Big Red totalled 314 yards of offense to the Harvard Crimson's 492. Jameson Wang completed 21 of 30 passing attempts, totalling 153 yards, two touchdowns, and no interceptions. Wang was also the leading rusher for the Big Red, with 67 yards in 13 carries. Cornell's leading receiver was Samuel Musungu, who caught six passes for 84 yards.

=== At Bucknell ===
Team	1	2	3	4	Total
• Cornell	21	6	7	0	34
Bucknell	0	14	0	7	21

- Date: October 19, 2024
- Location: Christy Mathewson–Memorial Stadium, Lewisburg, Pennsylvania
- Game start: 1:02 p.m. EST
- Elapsed time: 3:26
- Game attendance: 1,245
- Game weather: Sunny; 64°F
- Referee: A. Florio

Returning to the road, the Cornell Big Red travelled to Bucknell University in Lewisburg, Pennsylvania on Saturday, October 19. The Big Red defeated the Bison, 34–21.

=== At Brown ===
Team	1	2	3	4	Total
Cornell	7	0	14	0	21
• Brown	0	3	7	13	23

- Date: October 26, 2024
- Location: Brown Stadium, Providence, Rhode Island
- Game start: 12:02 p.m. EST
- Elapsed time: 3:58
- Game attendance: 7,327
- Game weather: Sunny; 66°F; wind 15 mph NW
- Referee: C. Hanson

To begin the second half and final stretch of the Ivy League season, the Cornell Big Red travelled to Brown University in Providence, Rhode Island on Saturday, October 26. The Brown Bears defeated Cornell, 23–21.

=== At Princeton ===
Team	1	2	3	4	Total
• Cornell	21	14	14	0	49
Princeton	0	14	0	21	35

- Date: November 2, 2024
- Location: Powers Field at Princeton Stadium, Princeton, New Jersey
- Game start: 1:02 p.m. EST
- Elapsed time: 3:23
- Game attendance: 7,626
- Game weather: Sunny; wind 8 mph NW
- Referee: P. Overton

Following the defeat against Brown, Cornell travelled to Princeton University in Princeton, New Jersey on Saturday, November 2. The Big Red defeated the Princeton Tigers, 49–35.

=== Penn ===
Team	1	2	3	4	Total
• Penn	7	19	20	21	67
Cornell	21	7	7	14	49

- Date: November 9, 2024
- Location: Schoellkopf Field, Ithaca, New York
- Game start: 1:03 p.m. EST
- Elapsed time: 3:28
- Game attendance: 2,466
- Game weather: Sunny; 47°F; wind 7 mph S
- Referee: A. Randolph

Cornell returned to Ithaca for the final homestand of the season, facing the University of Pennsylvania on Saturday, November 9. The Penn Quakers defeated the Big Red, 67–49.

=== Dartmouth ===
Team	1	2	3	4	Total
Dartmouth	0	7	7	8	22
• Cornell	3	10	6	20	39

- Date: November 16, 2024
- Location: Schoellkopf Field, Ithaca, New York
- Game start: 1:03 p.m. EST
- Elapsed time: 3:25
- Game attendance: 4,212
- Game weather: Sunny; 47°F; wind 8 mph NW
- Referee: T. Bowman

For their final home game of the season, the Cornell Big Red played League-leading Dartmouth College on Saturday, November 16. In a senior day upset, the Big Red defeated rival Big Green, 39–22.

=== At Columbia ===
Team	1	2	3	4	Total
Cornell	0	3	0	6	9
• Columbia	0	7	7	3	17

- Date: November 23, 2024
- Location: Robert K. Kraft Field at Lawrence A. Wien Stadium, New York, NY
- Game start: 12:03 p.m. EST
- Elapsed time: 2:50
- Game attendance: 4,224
- Game weather: Sunny; 47°F; wind 22 mph NW
- Referee: E. Lewis

To conclude the 2024 season, the Cornell Big Red traveled to rival Columbia University for the Empire State Bowl on Saturday, November 23. The Big Red fell to the Lions, 17–9.

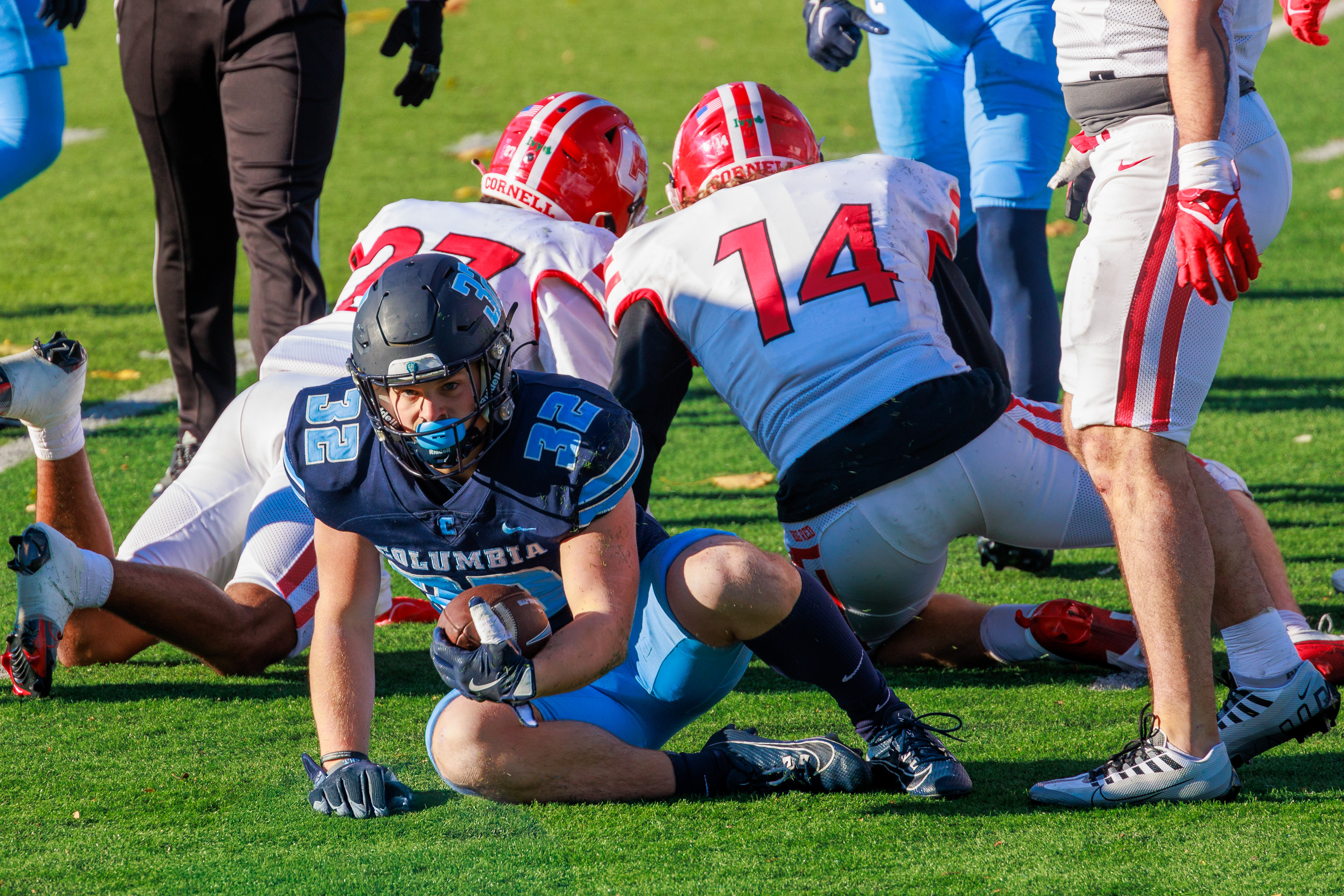
Columbia vs. Cornell

== Roster ==
2024 Cornell Big Red football team roster
Players
Coaches
Offense

Pos.	#	Name	Class
WR	0	Davon Kiser	Jr
QB	1	Jameson Wang	Sr
RB	2	Gannon Carothers	Jr
WR	3	Samuel Musungu	So
RB	4	Ean Pope	So
WR	5	AJ Holmes	Jr
WR	6	Luke Malaga	Sr
QB	7	Adam Landry	Fr
QB	8	Garrett Bass-Sulpizio	So
WR	9	Eddie Marinaro	Sr
QB	10	Dylan Hale	Sr
QB	11	Cameron Shannon	Fr
QB	12	Chad Martini	Sr
WR	13	Parker Woodring	Jr
QB	14	Devin Page	So
WR	15	Kendahl Hearne	Fr
WR	17	TJ Hamilton	Fr
WR	18	Doryn Smith	Jr
WR	21	Matheson Bossick	Sr
RB	22	Johntu Reed	Jr
RB	24	Robert Tucker III	Jr
WR	28	Catcher Dobron	So
RB	33	Ricardo Lagares Jr.	Fr
RB	41	Eddy Tillman	Sr
RB	46	Julian Dahl	Jr
TE	49	Nolan Albright	So
OL	57	Jackson Bradley	Sr
OL	58	Zach Quilici	So
OL	60	Kamal Harris	Fr
OL	61	Parker Spellacy	Jr
OL	64	Dylan Page	So
OL	65	Ty Short	Jr
OL	66	Evan Nesmith	Jr
OL	69	Kevin Ma	Jr
OL	70	Keegan Opper	Jr
OL	71	Timothy Bruen	So
OL	72	Tyler Dunn	Fr
OL	74	Matt Pante	So
OL	75	Davis Watson	Sr
OL	76	Jack Powers	Sr
OL	77	Raunak Jauhal	Fr
OL	78	Mac Dorward	So
OL	79	Joey Polinsky	Fr
WR	80	Brendan Lee	So
WR	81	Logan Taylor	Jr
WR	83	Darius Wise Jr.	Fr
WR	84	K'Adrian McLee	Fr
WR	85	Sebastian Dobron	Jr
TE	86	Ryder Kurtz	So
TE	87	Blaine Zoller	Fr
TE	88	Matthew Pilc	Sr

Defense

Pos.	#	Name	Class
DL	0	Muhammed-Ali Kobo	Sr
S	1	Trey Harris	Sr
S	2	Johnny Williamson	So
S	3	Christian Madison	Sr
CB	4	Camari Berry	So
S	5	Brayon Crawford	So
CB	6	Rick Coleman Jr.	Jr
CB	7	Braylon Howard	So
S	9	Damon Barnes	Sr
S	10	Jeremiah Lewis	Jr
S	11	Jackson Fortney	Jr
S	13	Tommy MacPherson	So
LB	14	Joey Cheshire	Jr
CB	16	Mikey Gayle	Fr
S	17	Nicholas Dlabach	Jr
LB	18	Keith Williams Jr.	Fr
S	20	Nomar Tejada	So
LB	21	Ben Sahakian	Jr
S	22	Rayjohn White	So
CB	23	David Aluya	Fr
S	24	Rodell Evans III	Fr
LB	25	Luke Banbury	Sr
CB	26	Michael O'Keefe	Sr
CB	27	Tyler Gibson	Fr
CB	28	Mamadou Bah	Sr
S	29	Kandakai Sherman Jr.	Fr
LB	31	Devia'n Parker-Rodgers	Jr
LB	32	James Reinbold	Jr
LB	33	Sean Cytrynbaum	So
LB	34	Nolin Thompson	Fr
LB	35	Ogbonna Ugwu-Uche	So
LB	36	Daniel Amasha	Jr
LB	38	Sean Polinsky	Jr
LB	39	Ian Wall	So
LB	40	Wilson Selzer	Sr
LB	45	Jack Ramsay	So
LB	47	Cooper Cameron	Fr
DL	48	Hunter Sloan	Sr
DL	51	Jason Kirkland	So
DL	53	Kastriot Panariti	Fr
DL	55	Mason Yacovelli	Jr
DL	56	Malachi Edgerly	So
DL	90	Gage Homola	Fr
DL	91	Brayden Walker	So
DL	92	Declan Ochendowski	Jr
DL	93	Brendan Chestnut	Sr
DL	94	Amon Williams	Sr
DL	95	Maxwell Van Fleet	Sr
DL	96	Tommy Ducker	Fr
DL	97	Ezekiel Evans	Sr
DL	98	Cole Bennett	Fr
DL	99	Devin Malone	Sr

Special teams

Pos.	#	Name	Class
K, P	23	Alan Zhao	So
K, P	37	Ayden McCarter	Sr
LS	41	Gavin Heintschel	Sr
P	42	Nathaniel Hillenburg	Sr
K, P	99	Caden Lesiewicz	Fr

Head coach

- Dan Swanstrom

Coordinators/assistant coaches

- Jared Backus (defensive coordinator / linebackers)
- Mike Hatcher (co-offensive coordinator / wide receivers)
- Sean Reeder (co-offensive coordinator / offensive line)
- Jeff Dittman (special teams coordinator / defensive assistant)
- Satyen Bhakta (defensive line / recruiting coordinator)
- Will Blanden (safeties)
- Andrew Dees (tight ends)
- Eric Franklin (defensive backs / cornerbacks / pass game coordinator)
- Terry Ursin (running backs)
- Jimmy Taylor (student assistant / quarterbacks)
- Alex Peffley (senior director of player personnel)
- Mark Ross (director of operations)
- Julien Deumaga (football operations and content coordinator)
- Trey Flowers (offensive analyst)
- Colin Norton (offensive analyst)
- Connor Hayes (defensive analyst)

Legend

- (C) Team captain
- (S) Suspended
- (I) Ineligible
- Injured
- Redshirt

Roster
