= 1988 Ithaca Bombers football team =

American college football season

1988 Ithaca Bombers football

NCAA Division III champion ICAC champion

Amos Alonzo Stagg Bowl, W 39–24 vs. Central (IA)
- Conference: Independent College Athletic Conference
- Record: 13–1 (3–0 ICAC)
- Head coach: Jim Butterfield (22nd season)
- Home stadium: South Hill Field

1988 Independent College Athletic Conference football standings
	Conf.					Overall
Team	W		L		T	W		L		T
Ithaca $^	3	–	0	–	0	13	–	1	–	0
RPI	2	–	0	–	0	7	–	2	–	0
St. Lawrence	2	–	2	–	0	4	–	5	–	0
Alfred	1	–	2	–	0	6	–	2	–	1
Hobart	0	–	4	–	0	0	–	9	–	0
$ – Conference champion; ^ – NCAA Division III playoff participant

The 1988 Ithaca Bombers football team was an American football team that represented Ithaca College as a member of the Independent College Athletic Conference (ICAC) during the 1988 NCAA Division III football season. In their 22nd season under head coach Jim Butterfield, the Bombers compiled a 13–1 record and won the NCAA Division III championship, defeating Central (Iowa) in the Amos Alonzo Stagg Bowl.

The team played its home games at South Hill Field in Ithaca, New York.

== Schedule ==
Date	Opponent	Site	Result	Attendance	Source
September 10	at Albany*	Albany, NY	W 17–3	1,500	
September 17	at St. Lawrence	Canton, NY	W 28–14	3,000	
September 24	Alfred	South Hill Field; Ithaca, NY	W 27–14	2,850	
October 1	Springfield*	South Hill Field; Ithaca, NY	W 24–0	3,800	
October 8	at American International*	Springfield, MA	W 35–7	1,000	
October 15	at Buffalo*	Buffalo, NY	W 36–3	3,487	
October 22	Buffalo State*	South Hill Field; Ithaca, NY	W 53–0	800	
October 29	Hobart	South Hill Field; Ithaca, NY	W 58–0	4,991	
November 5	at Cortland State*	Cortland, NY (Cortaca Jug)	L 20–21	7,100	
November 12	Washington and Jefferson*	South Hill Field; Ithaca, NY	W 34–3	2,318	
November 19	at Wagner*	Fischer Field; Staten Island, NY (NCAA Division first round)	W 34–31	7,500	
November 26	Cortland State*	South Hill Field; Ithaca, NY (NCAA Division III quarterfinal)	W 24–17		
December 3	Ferrum*	South Hill Field; Ithaca, NY (NCAA Division III semifinal)	W 62–28		
December 10	vs. Central (IA)*	Garrett–Harrison Stadium; Phenix City, AL (Stagg Bowl—NCAA Division III championship game)	W 39–24		
*Non-conference game
