= Joseph Hamilton (American football coach) =

American football coach (1919–2014)

Biographical details
- Born: April 1, 1919
- Died: December 15, 2014 (aged 95)

Playing career

Football
- c. 1939: Shurtleff

Basketball
- c. 1939: Shurtleff

Baseball
- c. 1939: Shurtleff
- Position: Guard (football)

Coaching career (HC unless noted)

Football
- 1946: Valley City State (assistant)
- 1948–1950: Ithaca (line)
- 1951–1955: Ithaca

Basketball
- c. 1946: Valley City HS (ND)
- 1948–1951: Ithaca (JV/freshmen)

Head coaching record
- Overall: 7–22–3 (college football)

Joseph L. Hamilton (April 1, 1919 – December 15, 2014) was an American football coach. Hamilton was the fourth head football coach at Ithaca College located in Ithaca, New York, serving for five seasons, from 1951 to 1955, and compiling a record of 7–22–3. He served as an emeritus professor at Ithaca.

Hamilton attended Shurtleff College in Alton, Illinois, where he played football as a guard as well as basketball, and baseball. He left Shurtleff in 1940, at the end of his junior year to enlist in the United States Army Air Corps. He served in the United States Army Air Forces during World War II, flying 74 missions un Europe, North Africa, and the Pacific. After the war, Hamilton earned a degree from Valley City State Teachers College—now known as Valley City State University—in Valley City, North Dakota. At Valley City State, he served as an assistant football coach in 1946. He also coached the basketball team at Valley City High School. Hamilton earned a master's degree from Indiana University.

Hamilton went to Ithaca College in 1948 as line coach for the football team and coach of the junior varsity and freshman basketball team. He succeeded Pete Hatch as Ithaca's head football coach in 1951. He was replaced as head football coach in 1956 by Art Orloske when he was appointed assistant professor at Ithaca's School of Health and Physical Education.

== Head coaching record ==
=== College football ===
Year	Team	Overall	Conference	Standing	Bowl/playoffs
Ithaca Bombers (Independent) (1951–1955)
1951	Ithaca	4–3			
1952	Ithaca	0–6–1			
1953	Ithaca	2–4			
1954	Ithaca	0–4–2			
1955	Ithaca	1–5			
Ithaca:		7–22–3			
Total:		7–22–3			
