= Mike Welch (American football) =

American football player and coach (born 1951)

Biographical details
- Born: June 11, 1951 (age 75)

Playing career
- 1970–1972: Ithaca
- Position: Fullback

Coaching career (HC unless noted)
- 1973–1976: Rush–Henrietta HS (NY) (assistant)
- 1977–1979: Albany (assistant)
- 1980–1984: Washington University (OC)
- 1984–1994: Ithaca (LB)
- 1994–2016: Ithaca

Head coaching record
- Overall: 169–78
- Bowls: 3–1
- Tournaments: 7–8 (NCAA D-III playoffs)

Accomplishments and honors

Championships
- 7 Empire 8 (2002–2005, 2008, 2013–2014)

Michael Walter Welch (born June 11, 1951) is an American former football coach. He has served as the head football coach at Ithaca College from 1994 to 2016.

== Athlete ==
Welch attended high school in Dansville, New York, where he played football at the halfback and linebacker positions.

Welch enrolled at Ithaca College athletics in 1969 and played both football and lacrosse. He played for Ithaca's varsity football team under College Football Hall of Fame coach Jim Butterfield from 1970 to 1972. After missing most of his sophomore year with an ankle injury, Welch gained 467 yards on 117 carries as a junior in 1971. As a senior in 1972, he played fullback and was selected as the team captain. He gained 257 yards on 61 attempts in 1972.

== Coaching career ==
=== Rush–Henrietta Senior High School ===
Welch graduated from Ithaca in 1973 and worked from 1973 to 1976 as an assistant football coach at Rush–Henrietta Senior High School in Rochester, New York.

=== Albany ===
In 1976, Welch became the offensive backs coach and later the defensive line coach at the University of Albany. He also received a master's degree in education from Albany in 1977.

=== Washington University ===
Welch accepted the offensive coordinator position at Washington University in St. Louis in 1980 and remained there for four years.

=== Ithaca ===
In 1984, Welch returned to Ithaca College as the school's linebacker coach. He later recalled, "Coming back to Ithaca College as a coach became a goal of mine once I started coaching at the college level. This was and continues to be one of the best small college coaching jobs in the country. For Division III, it does not get much better than Ithaca College." Welch spent ten years as an assistant coach at Ithaca, and during that time, the football team won national championships in 1988 and 1991, made NCAA playoff appearances in 1985, 1986, 1990, and 1992, and participated in the Eastern College Athletic Conference ("ECAC") playoffs in 1984 and 1987.

Welch took over as the head football coach in 1994 and, in his first season, led the Ithaca Bombers football team to a 10-3 record and a berth in the NCAA playoffs. Between 1994 and 2009, Welch led Ithaca to 16 consecutive winning seasons, a 128–46 record, and a .736 winning percentage. His teams have made the NCAA playoffs in 1994, 2001, 2003, 2005, 2007, 2008, and 2013. His teams have been ECAC playoff participants in 1996, 1998, 1999 and 2004. His best seasons as a head coach at Ithaca were: 2001, with an 11–2 record (.846 winning percentage) outscoring opponents 446 to 207; 2004, with a 9–2 record (.818 winning percentage) outscoring opponents 420 to 150 and 1994 with a 10-3 record and an appearance in the NCAA playoff semi-finals.

In 2006, Welch was elected to the American Football Coaches Association Board of Trustees. He is married to the former Susan Price with whom he has two children, Jessica and Jeff.

== Head coaching record ==
Year	Team	Overall	Conference	Standing	Bowl/playoffs
Ithaca Bombers (NCAA Division III independent) (1994–2001)
1994	Ithaca	10–3			L NCAA Division III Semifinal
1995	Ithaca	5–4			
1996	Ithaca	7–3			W ECAC Northeast Bowl
1997	Ithaca	7–3			
1998	Ithaca	9–2			W ECAC Northwest Bowl
1999	Ithaca	7–4			L ECAC Northwest Bowl
2000	Ithaca	7–3			
2001	Ithaca	11–2			L NCAA Division III Quarterfinal
Ithaca Bombers (Empire 8) (2002–2016)
2002	Ithaca	7–3	4–0	1st	
2003	Ithaca	10–3	4–0	1st	L NCAA Division III Quarterfinal
2004	Ithaca	9–2	5–1	T–1st	W ECAC Northwest Bowl
2005	Ithaca	8–3	6–0	1st	L NCAA Division III First Round
2006	Ithaca	7–3	4–2	T–3rd	
2007	Ithaca	8–3	4–2	T–3rd	L NCAA Division III First Round
2008	Ithaca	9–2	5–1	1st	L NCAA Division III First Round
2009	Ithaca	7–3	3–2	T–3rd	
2010	Ithaca	6–4	3–2	T–2nd	
2011	Ithaca	4–6	2–5	T–5th	
2012	Ithaca	6–4	4–3	T–3rd	
2013	Ithaca	9–3	6–1	1st	L NCAA Division III Second Round
2014	Ithaca	7–4	6–2	T–1st	L NCAA Division III First Round
2015	Ithaca	4–6	2–6	T–8th	
2016	Ithaca	5–5	4–4	5th	
Ithaca:		169–78			
Total:		169–78			
National championship Conference title Conference division title or championship game berth
