= 1979 Ithaca Bombers football team =

American college football season

1979 Ithaca Bombers football

NCAA Division III champion ICAC champion

Stagg Bowl, W 14–10 vs. Wittenberg
- Conference: Independent College Athletic Conference
- Record: 11–2 (2–0 ICAC)
- Head coach: Jim Butterfield (13th season)
- Offensive coordinator: Jerry Boyes (3rd season)
- Captains: Bill George; John Laper

1979 Independent College Athletic Conference football standings
| | Conf. | | | | | Overall |
| Team | W | | L | | T | W | | L | | T |
|---|---|---|---|---|---|---|---|---|---|---|
| Ithaca $^ | 2 | – | 0 | – | 0 | 11 | – | 2 | – | 0 |
| Alfred | 2 | – | 1 | – | 0 | 7 | – | 2 | – | 0 |
| Hobart | 2 | – | 1 | – | 0 | 4 | – | 5 | – | 0 |
| St. Lawrence | 1 | – | 3 | – | 0 | 3 | – | 6 | – | 0 |
| RPI | 0 | – | 2 | – | 0 | 3 | – | 4 | – | 1 |
$ – Conference champion; ^ – NCAA Division III playoff participant

The 1979 Ithaca Bombers football team was an American football team that represented Ithaca College as a member of the Independent College Athletic Conference (ICAC) during the 1979 NCAA Division III football season. In their 13th season under head coach Jim Butterfield, the Bombers compiled an 11–2 record and won the NCAA Division III championship.

The Bombers advanced to the 1979 NCAA Division III playoffs, defeating Dubuque (27–7) in the quarterfinals, Carnegie Mellon (15–6) in the semifinals, and Wittenberg (14–10) in the Amos Alonzo Stagg Bowl for the national championship.

Ithaca's 1979 season was part of a school-record 18-game winning streak. The streak commenced on October 27, 1979, and continued through the 1980 regular season, ending with a loss to Dayton in the 1980 NCAA Division III championship game.

Three Ithaca players were named to the NCAA Division III All-America football team as selected by the sports information directors. Senior center and co-captain Bill George and senior linebacker and co-captain John Laper were both named to the first team. Senior running back John Nicolo totaled 880 rushing yards and was named to the second team. Laper led the team with 173 tackles (61 unassisted) and five interceptions and also received first-team honors from the American Football Coaches Association on the Kodak College Division All-America team.

The team played its home games at South Hill Field in Ithaca, New York.

== Schedule ==
| Date | Opponent | Site | Result | Attendance | Source |
|---|---|---|---|---|---|
| September 8 | Bloomsburg State | South Hill Field; Ithaca, NY | W 13–6 | 6,800 | |
| September 15 | St. Lawrence | South Hill Field; Ithaca, NY | W 15–13 | 8,000 | |
| September 22 | Cortland State | South Hill Field; Ithaca, NY (Cortaca Jug) | W 42–7 | 7,200 | |
| September 29 | at Alfred | Merrill Field; Alfred, NY | W 34–12 | 3,250 | |
| October 6 | at Clarion State | Clarion, PA | L 10–12 | 6,000 | |
| October 13 | at Springfield | Springfield, MA | W 21–14 | 1,633 | |
| October 20 | American International | South Hill Field; Ithaca, NY | L 19–24 | 7,000–9,000 | |
| October 27 | at Canisius | Buffalo, NY | W 33–14 | 600 | |
| November 3 | Albany | South Hill Field; Ithaca, NY | W 46–6 | 4,500 | |
| November 10 | at Brockport State | Brockport, NY | W 35–7 | 2,400 | |
| November 17 | at Dubuque | Dubuque, IA (NCAA Division III quarterfinal) | W 27–7 | | |
| November 24 | Carnegie Mellon | South Hill Field; Ithaca, NY (NCAA Division III semifinal) | W 15–6 | | |
| December 1 | vs. Wittenberg | Phenix Municipal Stadium; Phenix City, AL (Stagg Bowl—NCAA Division III championship game) | W 14–10 | 7,200 | |
