= Michael Toerper =

American football coach (born 1986)

Current position
- Title: Defensive coordinator
- Team: Cornell
- Conference: Ivy League

Biographical details
- Born: June 9, 1986 (age 40); York, Pennsylvania, U.S.

Playing career
- 2005–2008: Pittsburgh
- Position: Defensive back

Coaching career (HC unless noted)
- 2009: Duquesne (DA)
- 2010–2012: Johns Hopkins (WR)
- 2013: Johns Hopkins (ST/DB)
- 2014–2016: Johns Hopkins (ST/DB/RC)
- 2017–2019: Ithaca (DC)
- 2020–2021: Holy Cross (S)
- 2022–2025: Ithaca
- 2026–present: Cornell (DC)

Head coaching record
- Overall: 35–10
- Tournaments: 3–2 (NCAA D-III playoffs)

Accomplishments and honors

Championships
- 2 Liberty (2022–2023)

Awards
- AFCA Region 1 Coach of the Year (2022); D3football.com Region 2 Coach of the Year (2022); Liberty League Coaching Staff of the Year (2022)

Michael Fredericks Toerper (born June 9, 1986) is an American college football coach. He is the defensive coordinator for Cornell, a position he has held since 2025.

== Playing career ==
Toerper played high school football for Central York High in York, Pennsylvania. He played receiver and defensive back as he tallied 100 tackles and eight interceptions in his final two seasons. He also added 73 receptions for 832 yards and seven touchdowns on the offensive side of the ball. He also played basketball and volleyball.

Toerper played college football for Pittsburgh. During his four-year stretch with the Panthers he played in 36 games mainly on special teams. He played in a career-high twelve games and had six tackles in 2007.

== Coaching career ==
Toerper began his coaching career with Duquesne as a defensive assistant in 2009 before joining Johns Hopkins as the team's wide receivers coach in 2010. He spent his first three seasons as a wide receivers coach before becoming the special teams coordinator and defensive back coach in 2013 while adding also recruiting coordinator duties in 2014. The team won the Centennial Conference all seven years he was part of the staff.

In 2017, Toerper joined Ithaca as the team's defensive coordinator. In his first season he held opposing teams to a team-low, since 2012, 15.3 points per game and 284.6 yards per game. Seven members of the defense went on to earn Liberty League postseason awards.

In 2020, Toerper was named safeties coach for Division I FCS Holy Cross. He helped lead the defense and team to its first-ever FCS playoff victory over Sacred Heart.

In 2022, Toerper rejoined Ithaca after Dan Swanstrom announced his departure from the team. In his first season with the team he finished 12–1, which was good enough for 1st in the Liberty League. He helped lead the team past Cortland in the 63rd Cortaca Jug at Yankee Stadium in front of 40,232 fans. The team had its first undefeated regular season since 1986 and capped off the season with a trip to the Division III playoffs. In the first round the team beat UMass Dartmouth 63–20. After beating Springfield 31–20 they would eventually lose to the eventual Division III champions North Central (IL) 7–48. Sixteen players were named to All-Liberty League teams following the season.

== Head coaching record ==
Year	Team	Overall	Conference	Standing	Bowl/playoffs	AFCA^{#}
Ithaca Bombers (Liberty League) (2022–2025)
2022	Ithaca	12–1	6–0	1st	L NCAA Division III Quarterfinal	10
2023	Ithaca	9–3	6–0	1st	L NCAA Division III Second Round	18
2024	Ithaca	6–4	5–1	2nd		
2025	Ithaca	8–2	6–1	2nd		
Ithaca:		35–10	23–2			
Total:		35–10				
National championship Conference title Conference division title or championship game berth
