= 2024 Dartmouth Big Green football team =

American college football season

2024 Dartmouth Big Green football

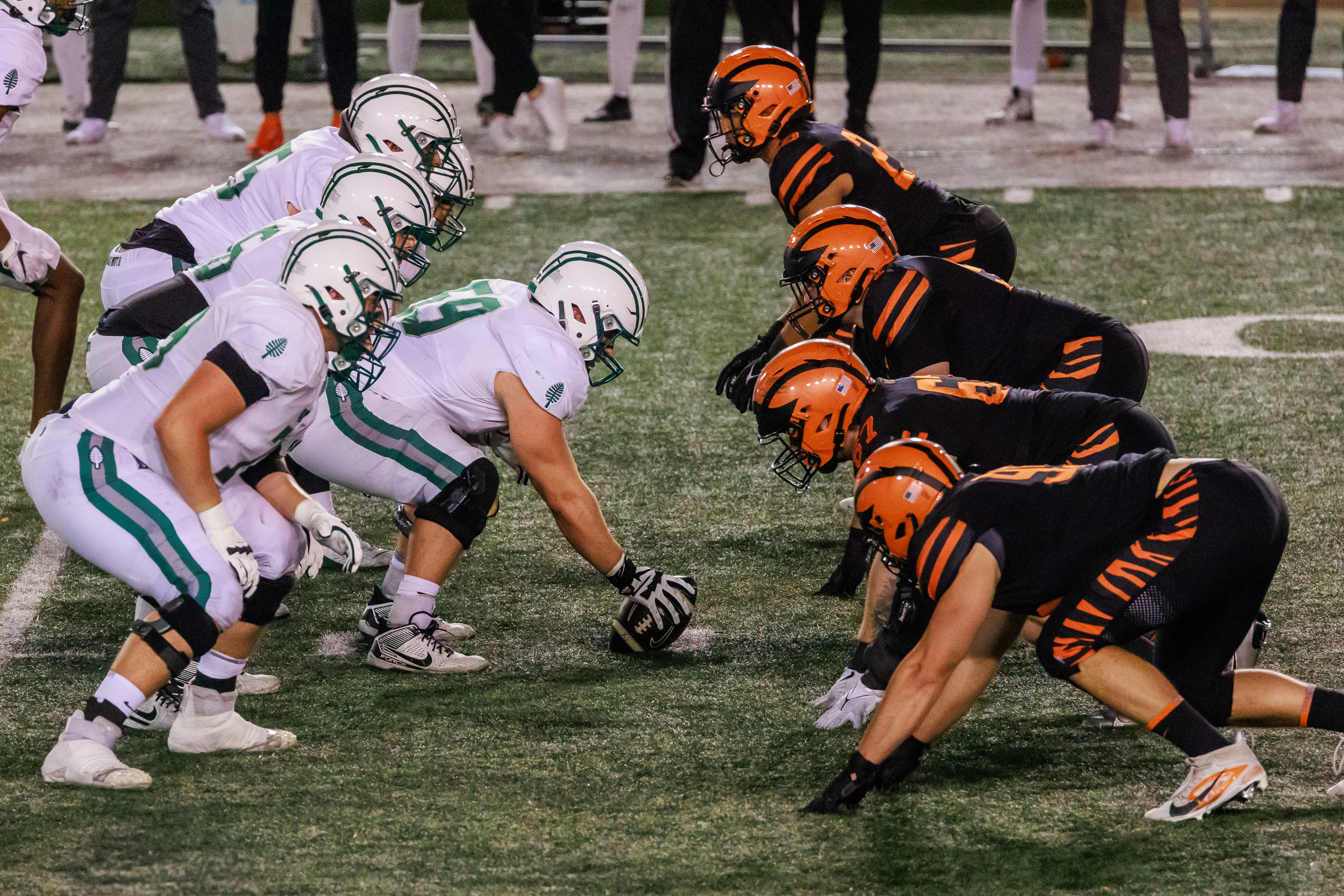
- Big Green (left) beat Princeton, 26–17

Ivy League co-champion
- Conference: Ivy League
- Record: 8–2 (5–2 Ivy)
- Head coach: Sammy McCorkle (2nd season)
- Offensive coordinator: Kevin Daft (7th season)
- Defensive coordinator: Don Dobes (14th season)
- Home stadium: Memorial Field

2024 Ivy League football standings
	Conf.			Overall
Team	W		L	W		L
Dartmouth +	5	–	2	8	–	2
No. 25 Harvard +	5	–	2	8	–	2
Columbia +	5	–	2	7	–	3
Yale	4	–	3	7	–	3
Cornell	3	–	4	4	–	6
Penn	2	–	5	4	–	6
Brown	2	–	5	3	–	7
Princeton	2	–	5	3	–	7
+ – Conference co-champions; Rankings from STATS Poll

The 2024 Dartmouth Big Green football team represented Dartmouth College as a member of the Ivy League during the 2024 NCAA Division I FCS football season. The Big Green were led by second-year head coach Sammy McCorkle and played home games at Memorial Field.

== Schedule ==
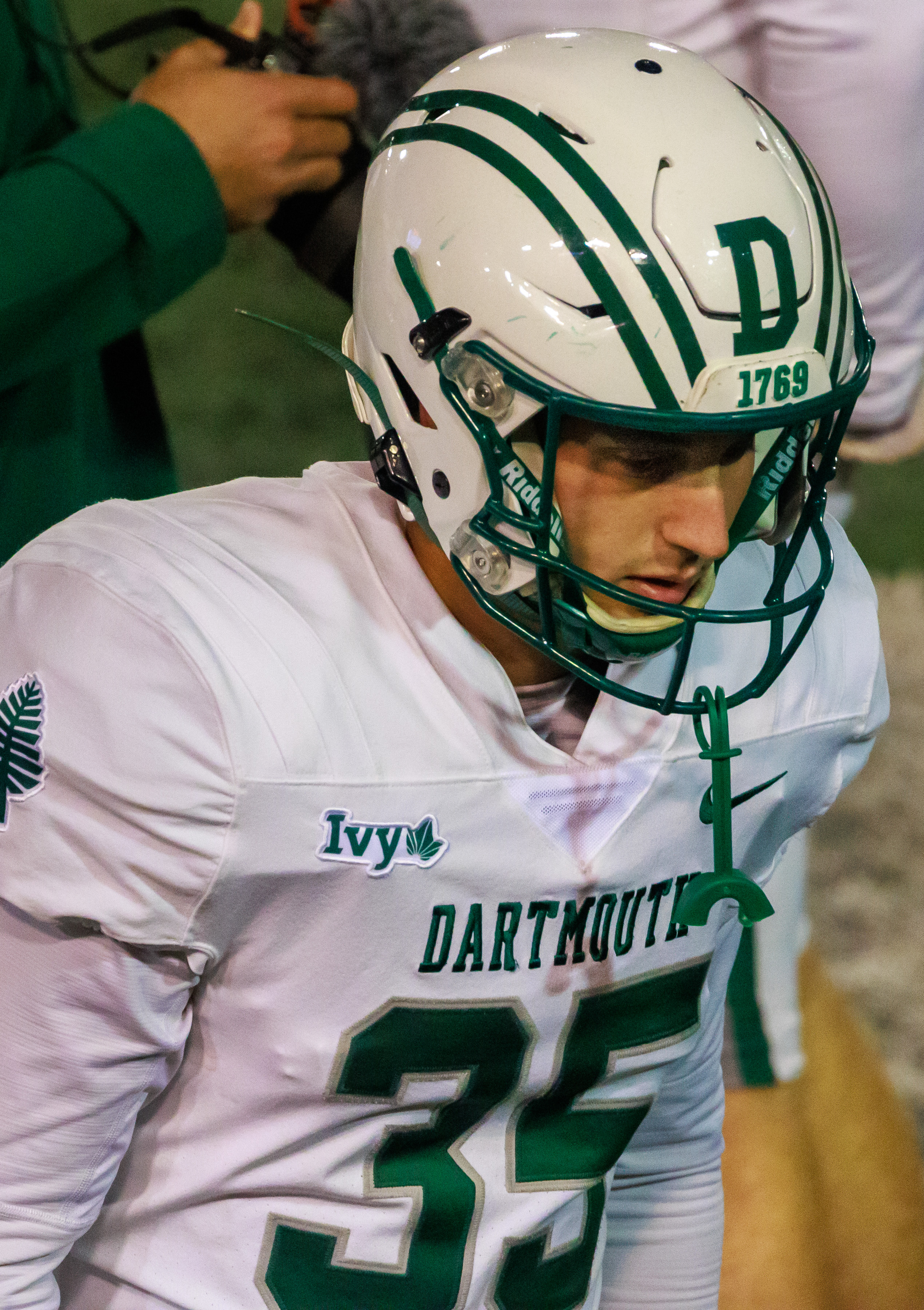
Owen Zalc was named Ivy League Special Teams Player of the Year

Date	Time	Opponent	Rank	Site	TV	Result	Attendance
September 21	1:00 p.m.	Fordham*		Memorial Field; Hanover, NH	ESPN+	W 45–13	3,573
September 28	1:00 p.m.	at Merrimack*		Duane Stadium; North Andover, MA	NESN+/ESPN+	W 16–14	15,211
October 5	1:00 p.m.	Penn		Memorial Field; Hanover, NH	ESPN+	W 20–17	4,746
October 12	12:00 p.m.	at Yale		Yale Bowl; New Haven, CT	ESPN+	W 44–43 ^{OT}	4,983
October 19	1:00 p.m.	Central Connecticut*	No. 22	Memorial Field; Hanover, NH	ESPN+	W 20–16	2,573
October 26	1:30 p.m.	at Columbia	No. 22	Robert K. Kraft Field at Lawrence A. Wien Stadium; New York, NY	ESPN+	W 24–21	12,642
November 2	1:30 p.m.	Harvard^{†}	No. 22	Memorial Field; Hanover, NH (rivalry)	ESPN+	L 27–31	7,711
November 8	6:00 p.m.	at Princeton		Princeton University Stadium; Princeton, NJ	ESPNU	W 26–17	3,222
November 16	1:00 p.m.	at Cornell		Schoellkopf Field; Ithaca, NY (rivalry)	ESPN+	L 22–39	4,212
November 23	12:00 p.m.	Brown		Memorial Field; Hanover, NH	ESPN+	W 56–28	2,769
*Non-conference game; ^{†}Homecoming; Rankings from STATS Poll released prior to the game; All times are in Eastern time

== Game summaries ==
=== Fordham ===
Game One – Fordham Rams (0–3) at Dartmouth Big Green (0–0) – Game summary

Quarter	1	2	3	4	Total
Rams	0	0	0	0	0
Big Green	0	0	0	0	0

at Memorial Field • Hanover, NH

- Date: Saturday September 21, 2024
- Game time: 1:00 PM EST
- Game weather: 0 °F (−18 °C)
- TV announcers (ESPN+): TBD

Game information

First quarter
Second quarter
Third quarter
Fourth quarter

Statistics	FOR	DART
First downs		
Total yards		
Rushing yards		
Passing yards		
Passing: Comp–Att–Int		
Time of possession		

Team	Category	Player	Statistics
Fordham	Passing		
Fordham	Rushing		
Fordham	Receiving		
Dartmouth	Passing		
Dartmouth	Rushing		
Dartmouth	Receiving		

=== at Merrimack ===
Game Two – Dartmouth Big Green (1–0) vs Merrimack Warriors (1–3) – Game summary

Quarter	1	2	3	4	Total
Big Green	7	3	0	6	16
Warriors	7	0	7	0	14

at Duane Stadium • North Andover, MA

- Date: Saturday September 28, 2024
- Game time: 1:00 PM EST
- Game weather: 67 °F (19 °C)
- TV announcers (NESN+/ESPN+): TBD

Game information

First quarter
Second quarter
Third quarter
Fourth quarter

Statistics	DART	MRMK
First downs	18	15
Total yards	280	264
Rushing yards	119	165
Passing yards	161	99
Passing: Comp–Att–Int	14–29–0	12–15–0
Time of possession	30:45	29:15

Team	Category	Player	Statistics
Dartmouth	Passing		
Dartmouth	Rushing		
Dartmouth	Receiving		
Merrimack	Passing		
Merrimack	Rushing		
Merrimack	Receiving		

=== Penn ===
Game Three – Penn Quakers (1–1) vs Dartmouth Big Green (2–0) – Game summary

Quarter	1	2	3	4	Total
Quakers	0	0	0	0	0
Big Green	0	0	0	0	0

at Memorial Field • Hanover, NH

- Date: Saturday October 5, 2024
- Game time: 1:00 p.m.
- TV: ESPN+

Game information

First quarter
Second quarter
Third quarter
Fourth quarter

Statistics	PENN	DART
First downs		
Total yards		
Rushing yards		
Passing yards		
Passing: Comp–Att–Int		
Time of possession		

Team	Category	Player	Statistics
Penn	Passing		
Penn	Rushing		
Penn	Receiving		
Dartmouth	Passing		
Dartmouth	Rushing		
Dartmouth	Receiving		

=== at Yale ===
Game Four – Dartmouth Big Green (3–0) at Yale Bulldogs (1–1) – Game summary

Quarter	1	2	3	4	OT	Total
Big Green	0	7	9	21	7	44
Bulldogs	2	21	7	7	6	43

at Yale Bowl, New Haven, CT

- Date: Saturday October 12, 2024
- Game time: 12:00 p.m.
- Game weather: Sunny • Temperature: 65 °F (18 °C) • Wind: NW 13 mph
- Game attendance: 4,983
- Referee: Eric Lewis
- TV announcers (ESPN+): Justin Gallanty (play-by-play) and Jack Siedlecki (analyst)

Game information

First quarter

- (02:56) YALE - Safety, (2-0 Yale)

Second quarter

- (14:52) YALE - Joey Felton 71 yd pass from Grant Jordan (Nick Conforti kick), (Drive 3 plays, 76 yards, 00:17; 9-0 Yale)
- (10:18) DART - Chris Corbo 32 yd pass from Grayson Saunier (Owen Zalc kick), (Drive 9 plays, 74 yards, 04:29; 9-7 Yale)
- (09:10) YALE - David Pantelis 62 yd pass from Grant Jordan (Nick Conforti kick), (Drive 3 plays, 75 yards, 01:08; 16-7 Yale)
- (01:44) YALE - Grant Jordan 1 yd run (Nick Conforti kick), (Drive 5 plays, 49 yards, 02:15; 23-7 Yale)

Third quarter

- (07:33) YALE - David Pantelis 17 yd pass from Grant Jordan (Nick Conforti kick), (Drive 8 plays, 50 yards, 02:57; 30-7 Yale)
- (05:51) DART - Grayson Saunier 1 yd run (Two-Point Conversion Failed), (Drive 4 plays, 75 yards, 01:36; 30-13 Yale)
- (02:31) DART - Owen Zalc 48 yd field goal 6 plays, (Drive 15 yards, 02:03; 30-16 Yale)

Fourth quarter

- (11:02) YALE - David Pantelis 10 yd pass from Grant Jordan (Nick Conforti kick), (Drive 5 plays, 29 yards, 02:20; 37-16 Yale)
- (07:30) DART - Paxton Scott 7 yd pass from Grayson Saunier (Owen Zalc kick), (Drive 11 plays, 75 yards, 03:32; 37-23 Yale)
- (06:34) DART - Daniel Haughton 7 yd pass from Grayson Saunier (Owen Zalc kick), (Drive 4 plays, 43 yards, 00:56; 37-30 Yale)
- (01:22) DART - Grayson Saunier 32 yd run (Owen Zalc kick), (Drive 8 plays, 71 yards, 01:58; 37-37 Tied)

Overtime

- (00:00) DART - Q Jones 2 yd run (Owen Zalc kick), (Drive 4 plays, 25 yards; 44-37 Dartmouth)
- (00:00) YALE - Chase Nenad 10 yd pass from Grant Jordan (Two-Point Conversion Failed), (Drive 6 plays, 25 yards; 44-43 Dartmouth)

Statistics	DART	YALE
First downs	24	28
Total yards	445	532
Rushing yards	157	120
Passing yards	288	412
Passing: Comp–Att–Int	22–42–0	32–47–0
Time of possession	27:26	32:34

Team	Category	Player	Statistics
Dartmouth	Passing	Grayson Saunier	20/34, 276 yards, 3 TD
Dartmouth	Rushing	Q Jones	18 carries, 84 yards, TD
Dartmouth	Receiving	Paxton Scott	6 receptions, 100 yards, TD
Yale	Passing	Grant Jordan	32/47, 412 yards, 5 TD
Yale	Rushing	Josh Pitsenberger	21 carries, 71 yards
Yale	Receiving	David Pantelis	8 receptions, 117 yards, 3 TD

=== Central Connecticut ===
Game Five – Central Connecticut Blue Devils (3–3) at No. 22 Dartmouth Big Green (4–0) – Game summary

Quarter	1	2	3	4	Total
Blue Devils	7	3	0	6	16
No. 22 Big Green	0	10	3	7	20

at Memorial Field, Hanover, NH

- Date: Saturday October 19, 2024
- Game time: 1:00 p.m.
- Game weather: Sunny, 55 °F (13 °C)
- Game attendance: 2,573
- Referee: Tom Zetts
- TV announcers (ESPN+): Matt Corsetti (play-by-play) and Chris Jared (analyst)

Game information

First quarter

- (3:19) CCSU - Isaac Boston 12 Yd pass from Brady Olson (Jack Barnum Kick) (Drive: 14 plays, 68 yards, 6:51; Central Connecticut 7-0)

Second quarter

- (10:45) DART - Owen Zalc 22 Yd Field Goal (Drive: 14 plays, 71 yards, 7:34; Central Connecticut 7-3)
- (5:54) CCSU - Jack Barnum 24 Yd Field Goal (Drive: 11 plays, 68 yards, 4:51; Central Conncticut 10-3)
- (1:46) DART - Grayson Saunier 4 Yd Run (Owen Zalc Kick) (Drive: 12 plays, 78 yards, 4:03; Tied 10-10)

Third quarter

- (4:45) DART - Owen Zalc 36 Yd Field Goal (Drive: 12 plays, 64 yards, 6:35; Dartmouth 13-10)

Fourth quarter

- (12:34) CCSU - Jadon Turner 13 Yd Run (Jack Barnum PAT failed) (Drive: 7 plays, 66 yards, 3:42; Central Connecticut 16-13)
- (5:13) DART - Grayson Saunier 1 Yd Run (Owen Zalc Kick) (Drive: 9 plays, 32 yards, 3:53; Dartmouth 20-16)

Statistics	CCSU	DART
First downs	19	22
Total yards	317	315
Rushing yards	113	138
Passing yards	204	177
Passing: Comp–Att–Int	16–30–0	15–21–0
Time of possession	27:30	32:30

Team	Category	Player	Statistics
Central Connecticut	Passing	Brady Olson	15/29, 168 yards, TD
Central Connecticut	Rushing	Jadon Turner	16 carries, 66 yards, TD
Central Connecticut	Receiving	Dave Pardo	4 receptions, 67 yards
Dartmouth	Passing	Grayson Saunier	15/21, 177 yards
Dartmouth	Rushing	Q Jones	16 carries, 51 yards
Dartmouth	Receiving	Daniel Haughton	3 receptions, 55 yards

=== at Columbia ===
Game Six – No. 22 Dartmouth Big Green (5–0) vs Columbia Lions (4–1) – Game summary

Quarter	1	2	3	4	Total
No. 22 Big Green	0	0	0	0	0
Lions	0	0	0	0	0

at Wien Stadium • New York, NY

- Date: Saturday October 26, 2024
- Game time: 1:30 p.m.
- Game weather: 0 °F (−18 °C)
- TV: ESPN+

Game information

First quarter
Second quarter
Third quarter
Fourth quarter

Statistics	DART	COLU
First downs		
Total yards		
Rushing yards		
Passing yards		
Passing: Comp–Att–Int		
Time of possession		

Team	Category	Player	Statistics
Dartmouth	Passing		
Dartmouth	Rushing		
Dartmouth	Receiving		
Columbia	Passing		
Columbia	Rushing		
Columbia	Receiving		

=== Harvard (|rivalry) ===
Game Seven – Harvard Crimson (5–1) vs No. 22 Dartmouth Big Green (6–0) – Game summary

Quarter	1	2	3	4	Total
Crimson	0	0	0	0	0
No. 22 Big Green	0	0	0	0	0

at Memorial Field • Hanover, NH

- Date: Saturday November 2, 2024
- Game time: 1:30 p.m.
- Game weather: 0 °F (−18 °C)
- TV announcers (ESPN+): TBD

Game information

First quarter
Second quarter
Third quarter
Fourth quarter

Statistics	HARV	DART
First downs		
Total yards		
Rushing yards		
Passing yards		
Passing: Comp–Att–Int		
Time of possession		

Team	Category	Player	Statistics
Harvard	Passing		
Harvard	Rushing		
Harvard	Receiving		
Dartmouth	Passing		
Dartmouth	Rushing		
Dartmouth	Receiving		

=== at Princeton ===
Game Eight – Dartmouth Big Green (6–1) vs Princeton Tigers (2–5) – Game summary

Quarter	1	2	3	4	Total
Big Green	0	0	0	0	0
Tigers	0	0	0	0	0

at Princeton Stadium, Princeton, NJ

- Date: Friday November 8, 2024
- Game time: 6:00 PM
- TV announcers (ESPNU): Eric Frede (play-by-play) and Jack Ford (analyst)

Game information

First quarter
Second quarter
Third quarter
Fourth quarter

Statistics	DART	PRIN
First downs		
Total yards		
Rushing yards		
Passing yards		
Passing: Comp–Att–Int		
Time of possession		

Team	Category	Player	Statistics
Dartmouth	Passing		
Dartmouth	Rushing		
Dartmouth	Receiving		
Princeton	Passing		
Princeton	Rushing		
Princeton	Receiving		

=== at Cornell (rivalry) ===
Game Nine – Dartmouth Big Green (7–1) vs Cornell Big Red (3–5) – Game summary

Quarter	1	2	3	4	Total
Big Green	0	7	7	8	22
Big Red	3	10	6	20	39

at Schoellkopf Field • Ithaca, NY

- Date: Saturday November 16, 2024
- Game time: 1:00 p.m.
- Game weather: Sunny • Temperature: 47 °F (8 °C) • Wind: NW 8 mph
- Game attendance: 4,212
- Referee: Todd Bowman
- TV: ESPN+

Game information

First quarter
Second quarter
Third quarter
Fourth quarter

Statistics	DART	COR
First downs		
Total yards		
Rushing yards		
Passing yards		
Passing: Comp–Att–Int		
Time of possession		

Team	Category	Player	Statistics
Dartmouth	Passing		
Dartmouth	Rushing		
Dartmouth	Receiving		
Cornell	Passing		
Cornell	Rushing		
Cornell	Receiving		

=== Brown ===
Game Ten – Brown Bears (3–6) at Dartmouth Big Green (7–2) – Game summary

Quarter	1	2	3	4	Total
Bears	0	14	14	0	28
Big Green	7	14	21	14	56

at Memorial Field, Hanover, NH

- Date: Saturday November 23, 2024
- Game time: 12:00 p.m.
- Game weather: Rain, 42 °F (6 °C)
- Game attendance: 2,769
- Referee: Cory Hanson
- TV announcers (ESPN+): Matt Corsetti (play-by-play) and Brandon Bojarsky (analyst)

Game information

First quarter

- DART – Grayson O'Bara 13-yard pass from Jackson Proctor (Owen Zalc kick), 11:00. Big Green 7–0. Drive: 7 plays, 73 yards, 2:30.

Second quarter

- DART – Painter Richards-Baker 35-yard pass from Jackson Proctor (Owen Zalc kick), 13:31. Big Green 14–0. Drive: 7 plays, 65 yards, 3:38.
- BRWN – Jake Wilcox 2-yard run (Christopher Maron kick), 6:12. Big Green 14–7. Drive: 2 plays, 9 yards, 0:21.
- BRWN – Ty Holtz 1-yard run (Christopher Maron kick), 0:55. Tied 14–14. Drive: 6 plays, 61 yards, 1:47.
- DART – Chris Corbo 20-yard pass from Jackson Proctor (Owen Zalc kick), 0:03. Big Green 21–14. Drive: 6 plays, 75 yards, 0:52.

Third quarter

- DART – Grayson O'Bara 72-yard pass from Jackson Proctor (Owen Zalc kick), 14:06. Big Green 28–14. Drive: 3 plays, 75 yards, 0:54.
- DART – Jordan Washington 57-yard interception return (Owen Zalc kick), 10:45. Big Green 35–14.
- BRWN – Ty Pezza 3-yard pass from James Murphy (Christopher Maron kick), 2:55. Big Green 35–21. Drive: 9 plays, 80 yards, 2:42.
- DART – Jackson Proctor 75-yard run (Owen Zalc kick), 2:32. Big Green 42–21. Drive: 2 plays, 75 yards, 0:17.
- BRWN – Levi Linowes 24-yard pass from James Murphy (Christopher Maron kick), 0:40. Big Green 42–28. Drive: 5 plays, 75 yards, 1:52.

Fourth quarter

- DART – Jackson Proctor 9-yard run (Owen Zalc kick), 13:00. Big Green 49–28. Drive: 6 plays, 75 yards, 2:40.
- DART – Jackson Proctor 2-yard run (Owen Zalc kick), 6:30. Big Green 56–28. Drive: 8 plays, 60 yards, 4:53.

Statistics	BRWN	DART
First downs	23	24
Total yards	435	594
Rushing yards	74	286
Passing yards	361	308
Passing: Comp–Att–Int	39–56–2	18–26–0
Time of possession	31:46	28:14

Team	Category	Player	Statistics
Brown	Passing	James Murphy	25/36, 256 yards, 2 TD, INT
Brown	Rushing	Jake Wilcox	4 carries, 25 yards, TD
Brown	Receiving	Ben Moseley	4 receptions, 80 yards
Dartmouth	Passing	Jackson Proctor	18/26, 308 yards, 4 TD
Dartmouth	Rushing	Jackson Proctor	13 carries, 171 yards, 3 TD
Dartmouth	Receiving	Grayson O'Bara	4 receptions, 124 yards, 2 TD
