= 2025 Cornell Big Red football team =

American college football season

2025 Cornell Big Red football
- Conference: Ivy League
- Record: 4–6 (3–4 Ivy)
- Head coach: Dan Swanstrom (2nd season)
- Co-offensive coordinators: Mike Hatcher (2nd season); Sean Reeder (2nd season)
- Offensive scheme: No-huddle spread option
- Defensive coordinator: Jared Backus (12th season)
- Base defense: Multiple
- Home stadium: Schoellkopf Field

Uniform
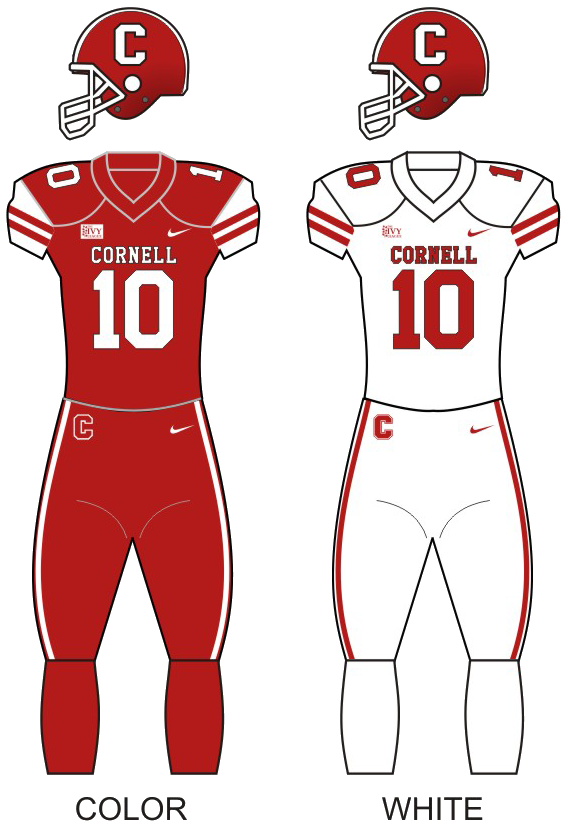

2025 Ivy League football standings
	Conf.			Overall
Team	W		L	W		L
No. 15 Yale +^	6	–	1	9	–	3
No. 20 Harvard +^	6	–	1	9	–	2
Dartmouth	4	–	3	7	–	3
Penn	4	–	3	6	–	4
Cornell	3	–	4	4	–	6
Princeton	2	–	5	3	–	7
Brown	2	–	5	5	–	5
Columbia	1	–	6	2	–	8
+ – Conference co-champions; ^ – FCS playoff participant; Rankings from STATS Poll

The 2025 Cornell Big Red football team represented Cornell University as a member of the Ivy League during the 2025 NCAA Division I FCS football season. The team was led by second-year head coach Dan Swanstrom and played its home games at Schoellkopf Field in Ithaca, New York.

== Preseason ==
=== Preseason poll ===
On August 4, Ivy League announced the preseason poll. Big Red were selected to finish in the seventh position.

== Schedule ==
The Cornell Big Red's 2024 football schedule consists of five away and five home games. Cornell will host Ivy League opponents Brown, Princeton, and Columbia, and will travel to Yale, Harvard, Penn, and Dartmouth. Cornell's non-conference opponents will be Albany of the Coastal Athletic Association Football Conference, rival Colgate of the Patriot League, and Bucknell, also of the Patriot League. Homecoming will coincide with the Big Red's home opener against Colgate on October 4.

In 2024, Cornell finished 4–6 overall and 3–4 in conference play.

Date	Time	Opponent	Site	TV	Result	Attendance
September 20	7:00 p.m.	at Albany*	Bob Ford Field at Tom & Mary Casey Stadium; Albany, NY	FloFootball	L 10–13	4,819
September 27	12:00 p.m.	at Yale	Yale Bowl; New Haven, CT	ESPN+	L 24–41	4,467
October 4	2:00 p.m.	Colgate*^{†}	Schoellkopf Field; Ithaca, NY (rivalry)	ESPN+	L 21–41	12,142
October 10	7:00 p.m.	at No. 22 Harvard	Harvard Stadium; Boston, MA	ESPNU	L 10–34	6,644
October 18	1:00 p.m.	Bucknell*	Schoellkopf Field; Ithaca, NY	ESPN+	W 30–20	4,205
October 25	1:00 p.m.	Brown	Schoellkopf Field; Ithaca, NY	ESPN+	W 30–24 ^{2OT}	3,242
November 1	1:00 p.m.	Princeton	Schoellkopf Field; Ithaca, NY	ESPN+	W 20–17	4,273
November 8	1:00 p.m.	at Penn	Franklin Field; Philadelphia, PA (rivalry)	ESPN+	W 39–17	10,914
November 15	1:00 p.m.	at Dartmouth	Memorial Field; Hanover, NH (rivalry)	ESPN+	L 14–24	3,523
November 22	1:00 p.m.	Columbia	Schoellkopf Field; Ithaca, NY (rivalry)	ESPN+	L 12–29	3,212
*Non-conference game; ^{†}Homecoming; Rankings from STATS Poll released prior to the game; All times are in Eastern time

== Game summaries ==
=== at Albany ===
Cornell Big Red (0–0) at Albany Great Danes (0–3) – Game summary

Quarter	1	2	3	4	Total
Big Red	0	0	3	7	10
Great Danes	3	3	0	7	13

at Tom & Mary Casey Stadium, Albany, NY

- Date: September 20
- Game time: 7:00 PM EDT
- Game weather: Sunny • Temperature: 60 °F (16 °C) • Wind: S at 3 miles per hour (4.8 km/h)
- Game attendance: 4,819
- Referee: Bill McKeever
- TV announcers (FloFootball): Rodger Wyland (play-by-play) and Michael Johnson Jr. (analyst)

Game information

First Quarter

- ALB – James Bozek 32-yard field goal, 1:04. Great Danes 3-0. Drive: 14 plays, 75 yards, 6:25

Second Quarter

- ALB – James Bozek 37-yard field goal, 1:40. Great Danes 6-0. Drive: 12 plays, 36 yards, 4:20

Third Quarter

- COR – Alan Zhao 25-yard field goal, 2:16. Great Danes 6-3. Drive: 8 plays, 33 yards, 3:00

Fourth Quarter

- ALB – Jojo Uga 43-yard run (James Bozek kick), 6:09. Great Danes 13-3. Drive: 5 plays, 71 yards, 2:21
- COR – Ryder Kurtz 6-yard pass from Devin Page (Alan Zhao kick), 3:38. Great Danes 13-10. Drive: 7 plays, 51 yards, 2:24

Statistics	COR	ALB
First downs	15	17
Total yards	260	268
Rushing yards	107	153
Passing yards	153	115
Turnovers	1	1
Time of possession	26:18	33:42

Team	Category	Player	Statistics
Cornell	Passing	Devin Page	8/12, 90 yards, TD, INT
Cornell	Rushing	Devin Page	10 carries, 57 yards
Cornell	Receiving	Ryder Kurtz	6 receptions, 68 yards, TD
Albany	Passing	Jack Shields	7/19, 70 yards, INT
Albany	Rushing	Jojo Uga	18 carries, 126 yards, TD
Albany	Receiving	Kylen Austin	3 receptions, 34 yards

=== at Yale ===
Cornell Big Red (0–1) at Yale Bulldogs (1–0) – Game summary

Quarter	1	2	3	4	Total
Big Red	7	7	7	3	24
Bulldogs	7	7	13	14	41

at Yale Bowl, New Haven, CT

- Date: September 27
- Game time: 12:00 p.m. EDT
- Game weather: Sunny • Temperature: 74 °F (23 °C) • Wind: SE at 2 miles per hour (3.2 km/h)
- Game attendance: 4,467
- Referee: Tom Zetts
- TV announcers (ESPN+): Jim Cain (play-by-play) and Jack Siedlecki (analyst)

Game information

First quarter

- (5:50) COR – Devin Page 1-yard run, Alan Zhao kick (Drive: 13 plays, 52 yards, 4:59; Cornell 7-0)
- (2:47) YALE – Josh Pitsenberger 3-yard run, Nick Conforti kick (Drive: 13 plays, 52 yards, 4:59; Yale 7-7)

Second quarter

- (11:31) YALE – Josh Pitsenberger 48-yard run, Nick Conforti kick (Drive: 3 plays, 56 yards, 1:01; Yale 14-7)
- (6:59) COR – Doryn Smith 3-yard pass from Devin Page, Alan Zhao kick (Drive: 9 plays, 38 yards, 3:33; 14-14)

Third quarter

- (12:16) YALE – Noah Piper 50-yard field goal (Drive: 4 plays, 65 yards, 1:37; Yale 17-14)
- (8:15) YALE – Noah Piper 36-yard field goal (Drive: 4 plays, -3 yards, 1:55; Yale 20-14)
- (7:54) YALE – Jaxton Santiago 20-yard pass from Dante Reno, Nick Conforti kick (Drive: 1 play, 20 yards, 0:05; Yale 27-14)
- (4:33) COR – Ryder Kurtz 21-yard pass from Devin Page, Alan Zhao kick (Drive: 7 plays, 80 yards, 3:14; Yale 27-21)

Fourth quarter

- (9:32) COR – Alan Zhao 32-yard field goal (Drive: 12 plays, 69 yards, 4:40; Yale 27-24)
- (1:56) YALE – Josh Pitsenberger 4-yard run, Nick Conforti kick (Drive: 9 plays, 75 yards, 1:09; Yale 34-24)
- (0:47) YALE – Abu Kamara 65-yard interception return, Nick Conforti kick (Drive: 9 plays, 75 yards, 1:09; Yale 41-24)

Statistics	COR	YALE
First downs	25	12
Total yards	400	297
Rushing yards	133	158
Passing yards	267	139
Turnovers	5	3
Time of possession	35:52	24:08

Team	Category	Player	Statistics
Cornell	Passing	Devin Page	24/51, 2 TD, 4 INT
Cornell	Rushing	Robert Tucker III	15 carries, 53 yards
Cornell	Receiving	Ryder Kurtz	5 receptions, 91 yards, TD
Yale	Passing	Dante Reno	14/23, 139 yards, TD, INT
Yale	Rushing	Josh Pitsenberger	28 carries, 142 yards, 3 TD
Yale	Receiving	Mason Shipp	7 receptions, 85 yards

=== Colgate (rivalry) ===
Colgate Raiders (1–3) at Cornell Big Red (0–2) – Game summary

Quarter	1	2	3	4	Total
Raiders	14	14	0	13	41
Big Red	0	6	15	0	21

at Schoellkopf Field, Ithaca, NY

- Date: October 4
- Game time: 2:00 p.m. EDT
- Game weather: Sunny • Temperature: 74 °F (23 °C) • Wind: SE at 2 miles per hour (3.2 km/h)
- Game attendance: 12,142
- Referee: Eric Lewis
- TV announcers (ESPN+): Nick DeLuca (play-by-play) and Matt Miller (analyst)

Game information

First quarter

- (10:58) COR – Treyvhon Saunders 22-yard pass from Jake Stearney, Luke Vogeler kick (Drive: 4 plays, 34 yards, 1:38; Colgate 7-0)
- (5:55) COR – Treyvhon Saunders 12-yard pass from Jake Stearney, Luke Vogeler kick (Drive: 4 plays, 65 yards, 1:51; Colgate 14-0)

Second quarter

- (13:00) COR – Doryn Smith 13-yard pass from Garrett Bass-Sulpizio, Alan Zhao PAT failed (Drive: 9 plays, 66 yards, 3:13; Colgate 14-6)
- (7:42) COR – Mason Mozo 2-yard pass from Jake Stearney, Luke Vogeler kick (Drive: 7 plays, 62 yards, 2:47; Colgate 21-6)
- (5:10) COR – Trooper Price 43-yard interception return, Luke Vogeler kick (Drive: 7 plays, 76 yards, 2:25; Colgate 28-6)

Third quarter

- (9:32) COR – Robert Tucker III 4-yard run, Alan Zhao kick (Drive: 10 plays, 94 yards, 3:34; Colgate 28-13)
- (1:17) COR – Garrett Bass-Sulpizio 1-yard run, Brendan Lee run for two-point conversion (Drive: 15 plays, 84 yards, 6:46; Colgate 28-21)

Fourth quarter

- (10:59) COR – Max Walters 21-yard pass from Jake Stearney, Luke Vogeler PAT failed (Drive: 11 plays, 72 yards, 5:11; Colgate 34-21)
- (0:25) COR – Cole Fulton 19-yard run, Luke Vogeler kick (Drive: 10 plays, 49 yards, 4:49; Colgate 41-21)

Statistics	COLG	COR
First downs	19	26
Total yards	384	458
Rushing yards	178	233
Passing yards	206	225
Turnovers	1	4
Time of possession	28:45	31:15

Team	Category	Player	Statistics
Colgate	Passing	Jake Stearney	16/25, 206 yards, 4 TD
Colgate	Rushing	Danny Shaban	11 carries, 91 yards
Colgate	Receiving	Treyvhon Saunders	6 receptions, 91 yards, 2 TD
Cornell	Passing	Garrett Bass-Sulpizio	23/38, 225 yards, TD, 2 INT
Cornell	Rushing	Garrett Bass-Sulpizio	18 carries, 91 yards, TD
Cornell	Receiving	Doryn Smith	7 receptions, 64 yards, TD

=== at No. 22 Harvard ===
Cornell Big Red (0–3) at No. 22 Harvard Crimson (3–0) – Game summary

Quarter	1	2	3	4	Total
Big Red	0	0	7	3	10
No. 22 Crimson	7	7	3	17	34

at Harvard Stadium, Boston, MA

- Date: October 10
- Game time: 7:00 PM EDT
- Game weather: Clear • Temperature: 54 °F (12 °C) • Wind: SW 8 mph
- Game attendance: 6,644
- Referee: Cory Hanson
- TV announcers (ESPNU): Eric Frede (play-by-play) and Jack Ford (analyst)

Game information
First quarter
- (12:49) HARV – Austin-Jake Guillory 36-yard fumble recovery, Kieran Corr kick (Harvard 7–0)

Second quarter

- (8:17) HARV – Ben Alvarez 2-yard pass from Jaden Craig, Kieran Corr kick (Drive: 13 plays, 52 yards, 6:26; Harvard 14–0)

Third quarter

- (9:31) HARV – Kieran Corr 22-yard field goal (Drive: 11 plays, 76 yards, 5:25; Harvard 17–0)
- (4:55) COR – Garrett Bass-Sulpizio 1-yard run, Jonathan Roost kick (Drive: 9 plays, 64 yards, 4:28; Harvard 17–7)

Fourth quarter

- (14:56) COR – Jonathan Roost 25-yard field goal (Drive: 11 plays, 53 yards, 3:13; Harvard 17–10)
- (11:58) HARV – Kieran Corr 30-yard field goal (Drive: 8 plays, 62 yards, 2:58; Harvard 20–10)
- (5:07) HARV – Jaden Craig 4-yard run, Kieran Corr kick (Drive: 9 plays, 61 yards, 5:10; Harvard 27–10)
- (4:58) HARV – Jack Donahoe 39-yard interception, Kieran Corr kick (Harvard 34–10)

Statistics	COR	HARV
First downs	14	22
Total yards	193	413
Rushing yards	66	176
Passing yards	127	237
Turnovers	2	1
Time of possession	26:05	33:55

Team	Category	Player	Statistics
Cornell	Passing	Garrett Bass-Sulpizio	18/30, 127 yards, INT
Cornell	Rushing	Garrett Bass-Sulpizio	16 carries, 30 yards, TD
Cornell	Receiving	Johntu Reed	4 receptions, 45 yards
Harvard	Passing	Jaden Craig	21/37, 237 yards, TD, INT
Harvard	Rushing	Xaviah Bascon	23 carries, 94 yards
Harvard	Receiving	Brady Blackburn	5 receptions, 101 yards

=== Bucknell ===
Bucknell Bison (4–3) at Cornell Big Red (0–4) – Game summary

Quarter	1	2	Total
Bison			0
Big Red			0

at Schoellkopf Field, Ithaca, NY

- Date: October 18
- Game time: 1:00 p.m. EDT
- Game weather: Cloudy • Temperature: 60 °F (16 °C) • Wind: N 6 mph
- Game attendance: 4,205
- Referee: Todd Bowman
- TV announcers (ESPN+): Nick DeLuca (play-by-play) and Matt Miller (analyst)

Game information

First quarter

- (7:46) COR – Jonathan Roost 32-yard field goal (Drive: 14 plays, 65 yards, 5:43; Cornell 3-0)

Second quarter

- (11:30) BUCK – Logan Bush 1-yard run, Matt Schearer kick (Drive: 8 plays, 85 yards, 3:30; Bucknell 7-3)
- (6:58) COR – Garrett Bass-Sulpizio 8-yard run, Jonathan Roost PAT failed (Drive: 10 plays, 60 yards, 4:24; Cornell 9-7)

Third quarter

- (11:53) COR – John McAuliffe 2-yard run, Jonathan Roost kick (Drive: 7 plays, 51 yards, 3:00; Cornell 16-7)
- (5:53) COR – Garrett Bass-Sulpizio 12-yard run, Jonathan Roost kick (Drive: 10 plays, 45 yards, 4:38; Cornell 23-7)

Fourth quarter

- (9:15) COR – Ryder Kurtz 30-yard pass from Garrett Bass-Sulpizio, Jonathan Roost kick (Drive: 8 plays, 64 yards, 4:19; Cornell 30-7)
- (5:28) BUCK – Sam Milligan 15-yard pass from Christopher Dietrich, Matt Schearer kick (Drive: 10 plays, 73 yards, 3:41; Cornell 30-14)
- (2:36) BUCK – Michael Cadden 13-yard pass from Christopher Dietrich, two-point pass conversion failed (Drive: 9 plays, 45 yards, 2:36; Cornell 30-20)

Statistics	BUCK	COR
First downs	19	26
Total yards	322	396
Rushing yards	87	232
Passing yards	235	164
Turnovers	2	2
Time of possession	27:21	32:39

Team	Category	Player	Statistics
Bucknell	Passing	Christopher Dietrich	19/32, 220 yards, 2 TD, 2 INT
Bucknell	Rushing	Logan Bush	9 carries, 29 yards, TD
Bucknell	Receiving	Sam Milligan	7 receptions, 78 yards, TD
Cornell	Passing	Garrett Bass-Sulpizio	14/22, 164 yards, TD
Cornell	Rushing	Jordan Triplett	22 carries, 107 yards
Cornell	Receiving	Doryn Smith	5 receptions, 46 yards

=== Brown ===
Brown Bears (3–2) at Cornell Big Red (1–4) – Game summary

Quarter	1	2	3	4	OT	2OT	Total
Bears	7	3	0	7	7	0	24
Big Red	6	0	0	11	7	6	30

at Schoellkopf Field, Ithaca, NY

- Date: October 25
- Game time: 1:00 p.m. EDT
- Game weather: Cloudy • Temperature: 50 °F (10 °C) • Wind: NE at 4 miles per hour (6.4 km/h)
- Game attendance: 3,242
- Referee: Todd Boyd
- TV announcers (ESPN+): Nick DeLuca (play-by-play) and Matt Miller (analyst)

Game information
First quarter
- (5:42) COR – Jordan Triplett 5-yard run (Drive: 8 plays, 75 yards, 2:17; Cornell 6–0)
- (2:15) BRWN – Ty Pezza 10-yard pass from James Murphy, Drew Crabtree kick (Drive: 7 plays, 75 yards, 3:27; Brown 7–6)

Second quarter

- (7:21) BRWN – Drew Crabtree 38-yard field goal (Drive: 7 plays, 60 yards, 2:41; Brown 10–6)

Third quarter

- No scoring plays

Fourth quarter

- (14:55) BRWN – Qwentin Brown 1-yard run, Drew Crabtree kick (Drive: 15 plays, 90 yards, 3:46; Brown 17–6)
- (3:44) COR – Garrett Bass-Sulpizio 10-yard run, John McAuliffe pass (Drive: 8 plays, 69 yards, 1:34; Brown 17–14)
- (0:46) COR – Jonathan Roost 25-yard field goal (Drive: 9 plays, 66 yards, 0:58; Tied 17–17)

Overtime

- BRWN – Ty Pezza 25-yard pass from James Murphy, Drew Crabtree kick (Drive: 2 plays, 25 yards, 0:00; Brown 24–17)
- COR – Jordan Triplett 2-yard run, Jonathan Roost kick (Drive: 4 plays, 25 yards, 0:00; Tied 24–24)

Double overtime

- COR – Jordan Triplett 1-yard run (Drive: 6 plays, 25 yards, 0:00; Cornell 30–24)

Statistics	BRWN	COR
First downs	20	31
Total yards	503	503
Rushing yards	32	157
Passing yards	471	346
Turnovers	1	0
Time of possession	27:42	32:18

Team	Category	Player	Statistics
Brown	Passing	James Murphy	31/49, 471 yards, 2 TD, INT
Brown	Rushing	Matt Childs	11 carries, 22 yards
Brown	Receiving	Ty Pezza	9 receptions, 172 yards, 2 TD
Cornell	Passing	Garrett Bass-Sulpizio	28/48, 346 yards
Cornell	Rushing	Garrett Bass-Sulpizio	19 carries, 70 yards, TD
Cornell	Receiving	Ryan Matulevich	6 receptions, 100 yards

=== Princeton ===
Princeton Tigers (3–3) at Cornell Big Red (2–4) – Game summary

Quarter	1	2	3	4	Total
Tigers	14	3	0	0	17
Big Red	0	7	6	7	20

at Schoellkopf Field, Ithaca, NY

- Date: November 1
- Game time: 1:00 p.m. EDT
- Game weather: Cloudy • Temperature: 47 °F (8 °C) • Wind: E at 9 miles per hour (14 km/h)
- Game attendance: 4,273
- Referee: Eric Lewis
- TV announcers (ESPN+): Nick DeLuca (play-by-play) and Matt Miller (analyst)

Game information
First quarter
- (11:11) PRIN – Josh Robinson 27-yard pass from Kai Colón, Esteban Nunez Perez kick (Drive: 9 plays, 75 yards, 3:49; Princeton 7-0)
- (4:13) PRIN – Ethan Clark 4-yard run, Esteban Nunez Perez kick (Drive: 7 plays, 33 yards, 2:40; Princeton 14-0)

Second quarter

- (14:58) COR – Garrett Bass-Sulpizio 1-yard run, Caden Lesiewicz kick (Drive: 10 plays, 57 yards, 4:09; Princeton 14-7)
- (5:31) PRIN – Esteban Nunez Perez 21-yard field goal (Drive: 9 plays, 43 yards, 3:09; Princeton 17-7)

Third quarter

- (10:43) COR – Doryn Smith 5-yard pass from Garrett Bass-Sulpizio, Caden Lesiewicz PAT blocked (Drive: 10 plays, 75 yards, 4:17; Princeton 17-13)

Fourth quarter

- (11:15) COR – Ryder Kurtz 14-yard pass from Garrett Bass-Sulpizio, Caden Lesiewicz kick (Drive: 7 plays, 33 yards, 2:14; Cornell 20-17)

Statistics	PRIN	COR
First downs	19	18
Total yards	342	330
Rushing yards	123	213
Passing yards	219	117
Turnovers	2	2
Time of possession	29:32	30:28

Team	Category	Player	Statistics
Princeton	Passing	Kai Colón	16/32, 219 yards, TD
Princeton	Rushing	Ethan Clark	19 carries, 89 yards, TD
Princeton	Receiving	Roman Laurio	4 receptions, 97 yards
Cornell	Passing	Garrett Bass-Sulpizio	15/25, 117 yards, 2 TD, INT
Cornell	Rushing	Jordan Triplett	16 carries, 72 yards
Cornell	Receiving	Doryn Smith	5 receptions, 39 yards, TD

=== at Penn (rivalry) ===
Cornell Big Red (3–4) at Penn Quakers (5–2) – Game summary

Quarter	1	2	3	4	Total
Big Red	3	10	19	7	39
Quakers	0	10	7	0	17

at Franklin Field, Philadelphia, PA

- Date: November 8
- Game time: TBA
- Game weather: Sunny • Temperature: 64 °F (18 °C)
- Game attendance: 10,914
- Referee: Bill McKeever
- TV: ESPN+

Game information

First quarter

- (8:57) COR – Caden Lesiewicz 32-yard field goal (Drive: 7 plays, 45 yards, 2:04; Cornell 3-0)

Second quarter

- (14:54) PENN – Liam O'Brien 4-yard run, Mason Walters kick (Drive: 16 plays, 75 yards, 8:55; Penn 7-3)
- (11:40) COR – Caden Lesiewicz 23-yard field goal (Drive: 8 plays, 67 yards, 3:08; Penn 7-6)
- (2:43) PENN – Mason Walters 47-yard field goal (Drive: 14 plays, 46 yards, 8:57; Penn 10-6)
- (0:11) COR – Brendan Lee 2-yard pass from Garrett Bass-Sulpizio, Caden Lesiewicz kick (Drive: 10 plays, 75 yards, 2:32; Cornell 13-10)

Third quarter

- (14:02) COR – Jordan Triplett 3-yard run, Caden Lesiewicz PAT blocked (Drive: 3 plays, 24 yards, 0:49; Cornell 19-10)
- (9:26) COR – Gannon Carothers 22-yard run, two-point run conversion failed (Drive: 7 plays, 63 yards, 2:31; Cornell 25-10)
- (3:42) COR – Gannon Carothers 1-yard run, Caden Lesiewicz kick (Drive: 8 plays, 64 yards, 4:13; Cornell 32-10)
- (3:29) PENN – Donte West 75-yard run, Mason Walters kick (Drive: 1 play, 75 yards, 0:13; Cornell 32-17)

Fourth quarter

- (10:08) COR – Garrett Bass-Sulpizio 1-yard run, Caden Lesiewicz kick (Drive: 15 plays, 75 yards, 8:21; Cornell 39-17)

Statistics	COR	PENN
First downs	25	15
Total yards	448	304
Rushing yards	183	192
Passing yards	265	112
Turnovers	0	1
Time of possession	31:19	28:41

Team	Category	Player	Statistics
Cornell	Passing	Garrett Bass-Sulpizio	24/31, 265 yards, TD
Cornell	Rushing	Jordan Triplett	17 carries, 85 yards, TD
Cornell	Receiving	TJ Hamilton	5 receptions, 123 yards
Penn	Passing	Liam O'Brien	15/22, 112 yards
Penn	Rushing	Donte West	15 carries, 125 yards, TD
Penn	Receiving	Jared Richardson	5 receptions, 42 yards

=== at Dartmouth (rivalry) ===
Cornell Big Red (4–4) at Dartmouth Big Green (6–2) – Game summary

Quarter	1	2	3	4	Total
Big Red	0	7	0	7	14
Big Green	3	7	7	7	24

at Memorial Field, Hanover, NH

- Date: November 15
- Game time: 1:00 p.m. EDT
- Game weather: Sunny • Temperature: 42 °F (6 °C) • Wind: NW at 7 miles per hour (11 km/h)
- Game attendance: 3,523
- Referee: Henry Wimberg
- TV announcers (ESPN+): Matt Corsetti (play-by-play) and Jarod Richmond (analyst)

Game information

First quarter

- DART - Owen Zalc 25-yard Field Goal, 3:45. Big Green 3-0. Drive: 11 plays, 68 yards, 5:17.

Second quarter

- COR - Garrett Bass-Sulpizio 3-yard run (Caden Lesiewicz kick), 4:34. Big Red 7-3. Drive: 14 plays, 96 yards, 5:35.
- DART - D.J. Crowther 67-yard run (Owen Zalc kick), 3:04. Big Green 14-7. Drive: 3 plays, 75 yards, 1:30.

Third quarter

- DART - D.J. Crowther 20-yard run (Owen Zalc kick), 8:22. Big Green 17-7. Drive: 11 plays, 72 yards, 4:44.

Fourth quarter

- DART - Grayson Saunier 1-yard run (Owen Zalc kick), 14:17. Big Green 24-7. Drive: 12 plays, 63 yards, 6:30.
- COR - TJ Hamilton 33-yard pass from Garrett Bass-Sulpizio (Caden Lesiewicz kick), 8:02. Big Green 24-14. Drive: 8 plays, 77 yards, 2:52.

Statistics	COR	DART
First downs	21	20
Total yards	369	376
Rushing yards	41	254
Passing yards	328	122
Turnovers	1	0
Time of possession	24:54	35:06

Team	Category	Player	Statistics
Cornell	Passing	Garrett Bass-Sulpizio	37/45, 328 yards, TD
Cornell	Rushing	Jordan Triplett	12 carries, 46 yards
Cornell	Receiving	Ryder Kurtz	9 receptions, 91 yards
Dartmouth	Passing	Grayson Saunier	13/23, 122 yards
Dartmouth	Rushing	D.J. Crowther	31 carries, 197 yards, 2 TD
Dartmouth	Receiving	Chris Corbo	5 receptions, 53 yards

=== Columbia (rivalry) ===
Columbia Lions (1–7) at Cornell Big Red (4–5) – Game summary

Quarter	1	2	3	4	Total
Lions	7	15	0	7	29
Big Red	3	6	0	3	12

at Schoellkopf Field, Ithaca, NY

- Date: November 22
- Game time: 1:00 p.m. EDT
- Game weather: Sunny • Temperature: 42 °F (6 °C) • Wind: SW 9 mph
- Game attendance: 3,212
- Referee: Mark Queen
- TV announcers (ESPN+): Nick De Luca (play-by-play) and Matt Miller (analyst)

Game information

First quarter

- (3:27) COLU – Michael Walters 1-yard run, Hugo Merry kick (Drive: 8 plays, 80 yards, 3:41; Columbia 7-0)
- (0:30) COR – Caden Lesiewicz 32-yard field goal (Drive: 8 plays, 60 yards, 2:57; Columbia 7-3)

Second quarter

- (15:00) COLU – Braden Dougherty 13-yard pass from Chase Goodwin, Hugo Merry kick (Drive: 6 plays, 75 yards, 2:13; Columbia 14-3)
- (1:57) COR – Jordan Triplett 1-yard run, Caden Lesiewicz PAT failed (Drive: 7 plays, 75 yards, 2:46; Columbia 14-9)
- (0:04) COLU – AJ Simpkins 1-yard run, Chase Goodwin pass to Titus Evans for two-point conversion (Drive: 12 plays, 63 yards, 1:52; Columbia 22-9)

Third quarter

No scoring plays

Fourth quarter

- (14:55) COR – Caden Lesiewicz 37-yard field goal (Drive: 15 plays, 57 yards, 6:29; Columbia 22-12)
- (5:42) COLU – Griffin Johnson 14-yard run, Hugo Merry kick (Drive: 6 plays, 37 yards, 4:04; Columbia 29-12)

Statistics	COLU	COR
First downs	25	19
Total yards	423	313
Rushing yards	253	88
Passing yards	170	225
Turnovers	2	2
Time of possession	34:36	25:24

Team	Category	Player	Statistics
Columbia	Passing	Chase Goodwin	12/26, 170 yards, TD, 2 INT
Columbia	Rushing	Griffin Johnson	29 carries, 203 yards, TD
Columbia	Receiving	Beckett Robinson	5 receptions, 66 yards
Cornell	Passing	Garrett Bass-Sulpizio	19/34, 225 yards, INT
Cornell	Rushing	Jordan Triplett	11 carries, 67 yards, TD
Cornell	Receiving	Brendan Lee	6 receptions, 78 yards

== Roster ==
2025 Cornell Big Red football team roster
Players
Coaches
Offense

Pos.	#	Name	Class
WR	0	Davon Kiser	Sr
RB	2	Gannon Carothers	Sr
WR	3	Samuel Musungu	Jr
RB	4	Ean Pope	Jr
RB	5	Robert Tucker III	Sr
WR	6	AJ Holmes	Sr
WR	7	Ryan Matulevich	Fr
QB	8	Garrett Bass-Sulpizio	Jr
WR	9	Doryn Smith	Sr
QB	11	Adam Landry	So
WR	12	Cameron Shannon	So
WR	13	Parker Woodring	Sr
QB	14	Devin Page	Jr
WR	15	Ja'von Broussard	Fr
QB	16	Ty Blair	Fr
WR	17	TJ Hamilton	So
QB	18	Ryan Downes	Fr
WR	19	Xavier Bowman	Fr
RB	20	Josiah Allen	Fr
WR	21	Matheson Bossick	Sr
RB	22	Johntu Reed	Sr
RB	25	John McAuliffe	Fr
RB	27	Jordan Triplett	So
WR	28	Catcher Dobron	Jr
RB	33	Ricardo Lagares Jr.	So
TE	48	Joe Safar	Fr
TE, LS	49	Nolan Albright	Jr
OL	57	Jackson Bradley	Sr
OL	58	Zach Quilici	Jr
OL	59	Will Bagby	Fr
OL	60	Manan Raina	Fr
OL	61	Parker Spellacy	Sr
OL	62	Caleb Bowman	Fr
OL	64	Dylan Page	Jr
OL	65	Ty Short	Sr
OL	66	Evan Nesmith	Sr
OL	69	Kevin Ma	Sr
OL	70	Keegan Opper	Sr
OL	71	Timothy Bruen	Jr
OL	72	Tyler Dunn	So
OL	73	Seyi Akinbola	Fr
OL	74	Matt Pante	Jr
OL	75	Kyle Lenhart	Jr
OL	76	Avery Huggins	Fr
OL	77	Raunak Jauhal	So
OL	78	Kamal Harris	So
OL	79	Joey Polinsky	So
WR	80	Brendan Lee	Jr
WR	81	Logan Taylor	Sr
WR	82	Will Belleville	Fr
WR	83	Mateu Parker	Fr
WR	84	K'Adrian McLee	So
WR	85	Sebastian Dobron	Sr
TE	86	Ryder Kurtz	Jr
TE	87	Blaine Zoller	So
TE	89	Brandon Gilbert	Fr
OL		Mac Dorward	Jr

Defense

Pos.	#	Name	Class
LB	0	Keith Williams Jr.	So
S	1	Kandakai Sherman Jr.	So
S	2	Johnny Williamson	Jr
CB	3	Rayjohn White	Jr
CB	4	Camari Berry	Jr
S	6	Brayon Crawford	Jr
CB	7	Braylon Howard	Jr
S	8	Tommy MacPherson	Jr
S	9	Damon Barnes	Sr
S	10	Jeremiah Lewis	Sr
CB	11	Darius Wise Jr.	So
S	12	Duke Rich	Fr
S	13	Braylon James	Fr
LB	14	Joey Cheshire	Sr
CB	16	Mikey Gayle	So
S	17	Nicholas Dlabach	Sr
LB	18	Dalten Phelan	Fr
S	20	Nomar Tejada	Jr
LB	21	Ben Sahakian	Sr
CB	22	Jacob Carter	Fr
CB	23	David Aluya	So
S	24	Rodell Evans III	So
LB	25	Michael Taylor	Fr
CB	26	Michael O'Keefe	Sr
CB	27	Tyler Gibson	So
CB	28	Alex Ahaghotu	Fr
S	29	Noah McDuffie	Fr
CB	30	Bubba Shelton	Fr
LB	31	Devia'n Parker-Rodgers	Sr
DL	32	James Reinbold	Sr
DL	33	Sean Cytrynbaum	Jr
LB	34	Nolin Thompson	So
LB	35	Ogbonna Ugwu-Uche	Jr
DL	36	Daniel Amasha	Sr
LB	37	Bo Draheim	Fr
LB	38	Sean Polinsky	Sr
LB	39	Ian Wall	Jr
LB	40	Wilson Selzer	Sr
DL	41	Darryl Davis	Fr
LB	42	Mason Grabowski	Fr
LB	45	Jack Ramsay	Jr
LB	47	Cooper Cameron	So
DL	50	Jared Vilcina-Brown	Fr
DL	51	Jason Kirkland	Jr
LB	52	Cole Keith	Fr
LB	53	Connor Klein	Fr
DL	54	Brandon Dunn	Fr
DL	55	Mason Yacovelli	Sr
DL	56	Malachi Edgerly	Jr
DL	63	Josh Hwang	So
DL	88	Sam Greenspan	So
DL	90	Gage Homola	So
DL	92	Declan Ochendowski	Sr
DL	93	Kastriot Panariti	So
DL	94	Elliot Hampton	Fr
DL	95	Maxwell Van Fleet	Sr
DL	96	Tommy Ducker	So
LB	97	Saeed Moghaddam Adames	Fr
DL	98	Cole Bennett	So
DL	99	Maximus Tomaszewski	Fr
S		Jackson Fortney	Sr

Special teams

Pos.	#	Name	Class
K	23	Alan Zhao	Jr
K, P	30	Will Buck	Fr
K, P	39	Jonathan Roost	Fr
LS	43	John Maccarella	Fr
K, P	99	Caden Lesiewicz	So

Head coach

- Dan Swanstrom

Coordinators/assistant coaches

- Jared Backus (defensive coordinator / linebackers)
- Mike Hatcher (co-offensive coordinator / wide receivers)
- Sean Reeder (co-offensive coordinator / offensive line)
- Jeff Dittman (special teams coordinator / defensive assistant)
- Satyen Bhakta (defensive line / recruiting coordinator)
- Will Blanden (safeties)
- Andrew Dees (tight ends)
- Eric Franklin (defensive backs / cornerbacks / pass game coordinator)
- Terry Ursin (running backs)
- Alex Peffley (senior director of player personnel)
- Morgan Miller (director of recruiting operations & external relations)
- Julien Deumaga (football operations and content coordinator)
- Trey Flowers (offensive analyst)
- Colin Norton (offensive analyst)
- Connor Hayes (defensive analyst)

Legend

- (C) Team captain
- (S) Suspended
- (I) Ineligible
- Injured
- Redshirt

Roster
