= Leonard Schreck =

American football player and coach

Biographical details
- Born: c. 1907; Pennsylvania, U.S.

Playing career
- 1926: Cornell

Coaching career (HC unless noted)
- 1930: Ithaca
- 1931: Union (NY) (assistant)

Head coaching record
- Overall: 1–3–1

Leonard Bernard Schreck was an American college football player and coach.

== Early life and education ==
He was born in 1907. Prior to coaching, he was a member of the Cornell University varsity football team for two years as well as the freshmen football team, lacrosse team, and boxing team. He graduated from Cornell with an A.B. degree and in 1930, received his M.E. degree.

== Coaching career ==
Schreck was the first head football coach at Ithaca College in Ithaca, New York. He held that position for the 1930 season. His coaching record at Ithaca was 1–3–1.

In 1931, he was appointed assistant varsity football couch at Union College.

== Head coaching record ==
Year	Team	Overall	Conference	Standing	Bowl/playoffs
Ithaca Blue and Gold (Independent) (1930)
1930	Ithaca	1–3–1			
Ithaca:		1–3–1			
Total:		1–3–1			
