= Art Orloske =

American football coach

Biographical details
- Born: October 13, 1922; Farmington, Michigan, U.S.
- Died: January 21, 1997 (aged 74); Bridgeport, Connecticut, U.S.

Playing career

Football
- c. 1940: Marquette

Baseball
- 1943: Wisconsin
- 1947: Wisconsin
- Positions: End (football); Pitcher (baseball)

Coaching career (HC unless noted)

Football
- 1948–1949: Cameron HS (WI)
- 1950–1951: McDonell HS (WI)
- 1952: Jackson HS (WI)
- 1953–1955: Clarenceville HS (MI)
- 1956–1957: Ithaca

Head coaching record
- Overall: 3–10 (college)

Arthur J. Orloske (October 13, 1922 – January 21, 1997) was an American football coach. Orloske served as head football coach at Ithaca College in Ithaca, New York from 1956 to 1957 seasons, and compiling a record of 3–10.

Orloske attended St. Francis High School in St. Francis, Wisconsin, where he was an all-conference tackle in football. He then played college football as an end at Marquette University for two seasons, during his freshman and sophomore years. During World War II, he played for Camp Grant near Rockford, Illinois. Orloske transferred to University of Wisconsin, where he lettered twice in baseball. He earned a bachelor's degree from Wisconsin in 1947 and a master's degree the following year. Orloske coached at Cameron High School in Cameron, Wisconsin from 1948 to 1949, McDonell High School in Chippewa Falls, Wisconsin from 1950 to 1951, Jackson High School in Hixton, Wisconsin in 1952, and Clarenceville High School in Livonia, Michigan from 1952 to 1955. He succeeded Joseph Hamilton as Ithaca's head football coach in 1956.

== Head coaching record ==
=== College ===
Year	Team	Overall	Conference	Standing	Bowl/playoffs
Ithaca Bombers (Independent) (1956–1957)
1956	Ithaca	1–5			
1957	Ithaca	2–5			
Ithaca:		3–10			
Total:		3–10			
