= Jim Butterfield (American football) =

American football player and coach (1927–2002)

Biographical details
- Born: November 30, 1927; Tampa, Florida, U.S.
- Died: November 26, 2002 (aged 74); Ithaca, New York, U.S.

Playing career
- 1950–1952: Maine
- Position: Guard

Coaching career (HC unless noted)
- 1954–1955: Arms Academy (MA)
- 1956–1959: Maine (assistant)
- 1960–1966: Colgate (assistant)
- 1967–1993: Ithaca

Head coaching record
- Overall: 206–71–1 (college); 11–4 (high school)
- Tournaments: 21–8 (NCAA D-III playoffs)

Accomplishments and honors

Championships
- 3 NCAA Division III (1979, 1988, 1991); 11 ICAC (1974–1975, 1977–1980, 1984–1988)
- College Football Hall of Fame; Inducted in 1997 (profile)

Phillip James Butterfield Jr. (November 30, 1927 – November 26, 2002) was an American college football coach. He served as the head football coach at Ithaca College from 1967 to 1993. During his 28 seasons at Ithaca, Butterfield was one of the most successful coaches in the country winning 206 games and three NCAA Division III Football Championships (known as the Stagg Bowl). His teams finished as the runner-up in the Stagg Bowl four times. His total playoff record was 21–8.

After his retirement, Ithaca renamed their football stadium in his honor. Butterfield was inducted into the College Football Hall of Fame as a coach in 1997. He died of complications from Alzheimer's disease in 2002 in Ithaca, New York.

== Personal ==
Butterfield grew up in Westborough, Massachusetts. He graduated from Westborough High School in 1945 and in 1995 was inducted into the school's hall of fame.

Butterfield's brother, Jack, was a college baseball coach and executive in the New York Yankees organization. His nephew, Brian, is a Major League Baseball coach, who last coached with the Los Angeles Angels.

== Head coaching record ==
=== College ===
Year	Team	Overall	Conference	Standing	Bowl/playoffs
Ithaca Bombers (NCAA College Division independent) (1967–1970)
1967	Ithaca	4–4			
1968	Ithaca	3–5			
1969	Ithaca	3–5			
1970	Ithaca	4–4			
1971	Ithaca	5–3			
Ithaca Bombers (Independent College Athletic Conference) (1972–1989)
1972	Ithaca	5–4	2–0	2nd	
1973	Ithaca	5–4	2–0	NA	
1974	Ithaca	10–1	3–0	1st	L NCAA Division III Championship
1975	Ithaca	10–1	4–0	1st	L NCAA Division III Championship
1976	Ithaca	6–2–1	2–1–1	3rd	
1977	Ithaca	6–3	4–0	1st	
1978	Ithaca	9–2	3–0	1st	L NCAA Division III Quarterfinal
1979	Ithaca	11–2	2–0	1st	W NCAA Division III Championship
1980	Ithaca	12–1	3–0	1st	L NCAA Division III Championship
1981	Ithaca	6–3	2–1	2nd	
1982	Ithaca	6–4	1–2	3rd	
1983	Ithaca	7–3	1–2	3rd	
1984	Ithaca	10–1	3–0	1st	
1985	Ithaca	11–2	3–0	1st	L NCAA Division III Championship
1986	Ithaca	11–1	3–0	1st	L NCAA Division III Seminal
1987	Ithaca	7–3	3–0	1st	
1988	Ithaca	13–1	3–0	1st	W NCAA Division III Championship
1989	Ithaca	7–3	2–1	2nd	
Ithaca Bombers (NCAA Division III independent) (1990–1993)
1990	Ithaca	8–2			L NCAA Division III First Round
1991	Ithaca	12–1			W NCAA Division III Championship
1992	Ithaca	9–2			L NCAA Division III First Round
1993	Ithaca	6–4			
Ithaca:		206–71–1	46–7–1		
Total:		206–71–1			
National championship Conference title Conference division title or championship game berth

== See also ==
- List of college football career coaching wins leaders
