= Ithaca Bombers football =

College football team

- First season: 1930; 96 years ago
- Athletic director: Susan Bassett
- Head coach: Brandon Maguire; 1st season, 0–0 (–)
- Location: Ithaca, New York
- Stadium: Butterfield Stadium (capacity: 5,000)
- NCAA division: Division III
- Conference: Liberty League
- Colors: Blue, gray, and gold
- All-time record: 536–263–11 (.669)

NCAA Division III championships
- 1979, 1988, 1991

Conference championships
- 25
- Rivalries: Cortland (Cortaca Jug)
- Mascot: Bomber
- Website: athletics.ithaca.edu

The Ithaca Bombers football team represents Ithaca College in college football at the NCAA Division III level. The Bombers are members of the Liberty League, fielding its team in the Liberty League since 2017. The Bombers play their home games at Butterfield Stadium in Ithaca, New York.

The team's head coach is Brandon Maguire, who took over the position for the 2026 season. He was preceded by Michael Toerper.

== Conference affiliations ==
- Independent College Athletic Conference (1971–1990; rebranded)
- Empire Athletic Association (1991–1999; rebranded)
- Empire 8 (2000–2016)
- Liberty League (2017–present)

== Year-by-year results ==
National champion	Conference champion	Bowl game berth	Playoff berth

Season	Year	Head Coach	Association	Division	Conference	Record							Postseason	Final ranking
Season	Year	Head Coach	Association	Division	Conference	Overall			Conference				Postseason	Final ranking
Season	Year	Head Coach	Association	Division	Conference	Win	Loss	Tie	Finish	Win	Loss	Tie	Postseason	Final ranking
Ithaca Bombers
1930	1930	Leonard Schreck	NCAA	–	–	1	3	1	–	–	–	–	—	—
1931	1931	Bucky Freeman	NCAA	–	–	3	2	0	–	–	–	–	—	—
1932	1932	Bucky Freeman	NCAA	–	–	4	2	1	–	–	–	–	—	—
1933	1933	Bucky Freeman	NCAA	–	–	3	2	1	–	–	–	–	—	—
1934	1934	Bucky Freeman	NCAA	–	–	5	1	0	–	–	–	–	—	—
1935	1935	Bucky Freeman	NCAA	–	–	4	1	1	–	–	–	–	—	—
1936	1936	Bucky Freeman	NCAA	–	–	3	2	0	–	–	–	–	—	—
1937	1937	Bucky Freeman	NCAA	–	–	2	4	0	–	–	–	–	—	—
1938	1938	Bucky Freeman	NCAA	–	–	3	1	2	–	–	–	–	—	—
1939	1939	Bucky Freeman	NCAA	–	–	3	3	0	–	–	–	–	—	—
1940	1940	Bucky Freeman	NCAA	–	–	3	1	1	–	–	–	–	—	—
1941	1941	Bucky Freeman	NCAA	–	–	2	4	0	–	–	–	–	—	—
1942	1942	Bucky Freeman	NCAA	–	–	0	4	0	–	–	–	–	—	—
1943	1943	Bucky Freeman	NCAA	–	–	–	–	–	–	–	–	–	—	—
1944	1944	Bucky Freeman	NCAA	–	–	–	–	–	–	–	–	–	—	—
1945	1945	Bucky Freeman	NCAA	–	–	–	–	–	–	–	–	–	—	—
1946	1946	Bucky Freeman	NCAA	–	–	1	5	0	–	–	–	–	—	—
1947	1947	Pete Hatch	NCAA	–	–	2	3	0	–	–	–	–	—	—
1948	1948	Pete Hatch	NCAA	–	–	4	3	0	–	–	–	–	—	—
1949	1949	Pete Hatch	NCAA	–	–	4	2	0	–	–	–	–	—	—
1950	1950	Pete Hatch	NCAA	–	–	2	5	0	–	–	–	–	—	—
1951	1951	Joseph Hamilton	NCAA	–	–	4	3	0	–	–	–	–	—	—
1952	1952	Joseph Hamilton	NCAA	–	–	0	6	1	–	–	–	–	—	—
1953	1953	Joseph Hamilton	NCAA	–	–	2	4	0	–	–	–	–	—	—
1954	1954	Joseph Hamilton	NCAA	–	–	0	4	2	–	–	–	–	—	—
1955	1955	Joseph Hamilton	NCAA	–	–	1	5	0	–	–	–	–	—	—
1956	1956	Art Orloske	NCAA	College Division	–	1	5	0	–	–	–	–	—	—
1957	1957	Art Orloske	NCAA	College Division	–	2	5	0	–	–	–	–	—	—
1958	1958	Dick Lyon	NCAA	College Division	–	6	1	0	–	–	–	–	—	—
1959	1959	Dick Lyon	NCAA	College Division	–	5	2	0	–	–	–	–	—	—
1960	1960	Dick Lyon	NCAA	College Division	–	4	3	0	–	–	–	–	—	—
1961	1961	Dick Lyon	NCAA	College Division	–	4	4	0	–	–	–	–	—	—
1962	1962	Dick Lyon	NCAA	College Division	–	6	2	0	–	–	–	–	—	—
1963	1963	Dick Lyon	NCAA	College Division	–	6	2	0	–	–	–	–	—	—
1964	1964	Dick Lyon	NCAA	College Division	–	6	2	0	–	–	–	–	—	—
1965	1965	Dick Lyon	NCAA	College Division	–	8	0	0	–	–	–	–		—
1966	1966	Dick Lyon	NCAA	College Division	–	4	4	0	–	–	–	–	—	—
1967	1967	Jim Butterfield	NCAA	College Division	–	4	4	0	–	–	–	–	—	—
1968	1968	Jim Butterfield	NCAA	College Division	–	3	5	0	–	–	–	–	—	—
1969	1969	Jim Butterfield	NCAA	College Division	–	3	5	0	–	–	–	–	—	—
1970	1970	Jim Butterfield	NCAA	College Division	–	4	4	0	–	–	–	–	—	—
1971	1971	Jim Butterfield	NCAA	College Division	ICAC	5	3	0	–	–	–	–	—	—
1972	1972	Jim Butterfield	NCAA	College Division	ICAC	5	4	0	–	–	–	–	—	—
1973	1973	Jim Butterfield	NCAA	Division III	ICAC	5	4	0	–	–	–	–	—	—
1974	1974	Jim Butterfield	NCAA	Division III	ICAC	10	1	0	–	–	–	–	National champions	—
1975	1975	Jim Butterfield	NCAA	Division III	ICAC	10	1	0	–	–	–	–	National champions	—
1976	1976	Jim Butterfield	NCAA	Division III	ICAC	6	2	1	–	–	–	–	—	—
1977	1977	Jim Butterfield	NCAA	Division III	ICAC	6	3	0	–	–	–	–	—	—
1978	1978	Jim Butterfield	NCAA	Division III	ICAC	9	1	0	–	–	–	–	Playoff berth	—
1979	1979	Jim Butterfield	NCAA	Division III	ICAC	11	2	0	–	–	–	–	National champions	—
1980	1980	Jim Butterfield	NCAA	Division III	ICAC	12	1	0	–	–	–	–	National champions	—
1981	1981	Jim Butterfield	NCAA	Division III	ICAC	6	3	0	–	–	–	–	—	—
1982	1982	Jim Butterfield	NCAA	Division III	ICAC	6	4	0	–	–	–	–	—	—
1983	1983	Jim Butterfield	NCAA	Division III	ICAC	7	3	0	–	–	–	–	—	—
1984	1984	Jim Butterfield	NCAA	Division III	ICAC	10	1	0	–	–	–	–	Conference champions	—
1985	1985	Jim Butterfield	NCAA	Division III	ICAC	11	2	0	–	–	–	–	National champions	—
1986	1986	Jim Butterfield	NCAA	Division III	ICAC	11	1	0	–	–	–	–	Playoff berth	—
1987	1987	Jim Butterfield	NCAA	Division III	ICAC	7	3	0	–	–	–	–	—	—
1988	1988	Jim Butterfield	NCAA	Division III	ICAC	13	1	0	–	–	–	–	National champions	—
1989	1989	Jim Butterfield	NCAA	Division III	ICAC	7	3	0	–	–	–	–	—	—
1990	1990	Jim Butterfield	NCAA	Division III	ICAC	8	2	0	–	–	–	–	Playoff berth	—
1991	1991	Jim Butterfield	NCAA	Division III	EAA	12	1	0	–	–	–	–	National champions	—
1992	1992	Jim Butterfield	NCAA	Division III	EAA	9	2	0	–	–	–	–	Playoff berth	—
1993	1993	Jim Butterfield	NCAA	Division III	EAA	6	4	0	–	–	–	–	—	—
1994	1994	Mike Welch	NCAA	Division III	EAA	10	3	0	–	–	–	–	Playoff berth	—
1995	1995	Mike Welch	NCAA	Division III	EAA	5	4	0	–	–	–	–	—	—
1996	1996	Mike Welch	NCAA	Division III	EAA	7	3	0	–	–	–	–	Conference champions	—
1997	1997	Mike Welch	NCAA	Division III	EAA	7	3	0	–	–	–	–	—	—
1998	1998	Mike Welch	NCAA	Division III	EAA	9	2	0	–	–	–	–	Conference champions	—
1999	1999	Mike Welch	NCAA	Division III	EAA	7	4	0	–	–	–	–	—	—
2000	2000	Mike Welch	NCAA	Division III	Empire 8	7	3	0	–	–	–	–	—	—
2001	2001	Mike Welch	NCAA	Division III	Empire 8	11	2	0	–	–	–	–	Playoff berth	—
2002	2002	Mike Welch	NCAA	Division III	Empire 8	7	3	0	1st	4	0	0	—	—
2003	2003	Mike Welch	NCAA	Division III	Empire 8	10	3	0	1st	5	0	0	Playoff berth	—
2004	2004	Mike Welch	NCAA	Division III	Empire 8	9	2	0	1st	5	1	0	Conference champions	—
2005	2005	Mike Welch	NCAA	Division III	Empire 8	8	3	0	1st	6	0	0	Playoff berth	—
2006	2006	Mike Welch	NCAA	Division III	Empire 8	7	3	0	–	4	2	0	—	—
2007	2007	Mike Welch	NCAA	Division III	Empire 8	8	3	0	–	4	2	0	Playoff berth	—
2008	2008	Mike Welch	NCAA	Division III	Empire 8	9	2	0	1st	5	1	0	Playoff berth	—
2009	2009	Mike Welch	NCAA	Division III	Empire 8	7	3	0	–	3	2	0	—	—
2010	2010	Mike Welch	NCAA	Division III	Empire 8	6	4	0	–	3	2	0	—	—
2011	2011	Mike Welch	NCAA	Division III	Empire 8	4	6	0	–	2	5	0	—	—
2012	2012	Mike Welch	NCAA	Division III	Empire 8	6	4	0	–	4	3	0	—	—
2013	2013	Mike Welch	NCAA	Division III	Empire 8	9	3	0	1st	6	1	0	Playoff berth	—
2014	2014	Mike Welch	NCAA	Division III	Empire 8	7	4	0	1st	6	2	0	Playoff berth	—
2015	2015	Mike Welch	NCAA	Division III	Empire 8	4	6	0	–	2	6	0	—	—
2016	2016	Mike Welch	NCAA	Division III	Empire 8	5	5	0	–	4	4	0	—	—
2017	2017	Dan Swanstrom	NCAA	Division III	Liberty	8	3	0	T-1st	4	1	0	Bowl game berth	—
2018	2018	Dan Swanstrom	NCAA	Division III	Liberty	8	3	0	T-1st	4	1	0	—	—
2019	2019	Dan Swanstrom	NCAA	Division III	Liberty	8	3	0	–	4	2	0	—	—
Season canceled due to COVID-19
2021	2021	Dan Swanstrom	NCAA	Division III	Liberty	8	2	0	–	5	1	0	—	—
2022	2022	Michael Toerper	NCAA	Division III	Liberty	12	1	0	1st	6	0	0	Playoff berth	—
2023	2023	Michael Toerper	NCAA	Division III	Liberty								—	—
