= Pete Hatch =

American football coach (1911–1975)

Biographical details
- Born: March 22, 1911; New York, U.S.
- Died: October 16, 1975 (aged 64); Rochester, New York, U.S.

Playing career

Football
- 1931: Tri-State
- 1932–1935: Ithaca

Baseball
- ?–1936: Ithaca
- Positions: Quarterback (football); Third baseman (baseball)

Coaching career (HC unless noted)

Football
- 1936–1943: South Glen Falls HS (NY)
- 1944–1945: Kingston HS (NY)
- 1946–1950: Ithaca
- 1951–1952: Corning Free Academy (NY) (assistant)
- 1953–1962: Corning Free Academy (NY)

Basketball
- 1936–1944: South Glen Falls HS (NY)

Baseball
- 1937–1944: South Glen Falls HS (NY)
- 1945–1946: Kingston HS (NY)

Administrative career (AD unless noted)
- 1936–1943: South Glen Falls HS (NY)
- ?–1963: Corning Free Academy (NY)
- 1963–1971: East HS (NY)

Head coaching record
- Overall: 13–18

Harold J. "Pete" Hatch (March 22, 1911 – October 16, 1975) was an American football, basketball, and baseball coach and athletics administrator. He served as the head football coach at Ithaca College in Ithaca, New York, serving for five seasons, from 1946 to 1950, and compiling a record of 13–18.

A native of Granville, New York, Hatch attended Granville High School, where he played football under head coach Sam Eppolito. In 1931, he played football as a quarterback at Tri-State College—now known as Trine University—in Angola, Indiana. Hatch then moved on to Ithaca College, where he captained the football team and played on the baseball team. He graduated from Ithaca in 1936, and was hired as athletic director at South Glen Falls High School in South Glens Falls, New York. Hatch coached football, basketball, and baseball as South Glens Falls for eight years. In 1944, he went to Kingston High School in Kingston, New York, where he coached football and baseball for two years. Hatch returned to Ithaca College in 1946 when he was appointed as an instructor at the School of Health and Physical Education. He assisted Bucky Freeman in coaching the Ithaca Bombers football team in the fall of 1946 before succeeding Freeman as head football coach after the season. Ithaca credits Freeman and Hatch and co-coaches for the 1946 season.

Hatch also coached lacrosse at Ithaca, before resigning as head football coach 1951 to become an assistant football coach at Corning Free Academy (CFA) in Corning, New York under Ernest W. Craumer, the school's athletic director. Hatch succeeded Craumer as CFA's athletic director and served as the school head football coach for ten years. He left CFA in 1963 to become chairman of the physical education and athletic department at East High School in Rochester, New York.

Hatch retired as East High School's athletic director in 1971. He died on October 16, 1975, at a Strong Memorial Hospital in Rochester.

== Head coaching record ==
=== College football ===
Year	Team	Overall	Conference	Standing	Bowl/playoffs
Ithaca Bombers (Independent) (1946–1950)
1946	Ithaca	1–5			
1947	Ithaca	2–3			
1948	Ithaca	4–3			
1949	Ithaca	4–2			
1950	Ithaca	2–5			
Ithaca:		13–18			
Total:		13–18			
