= Dan Swanstrom =

American football coach (born c. 1982)

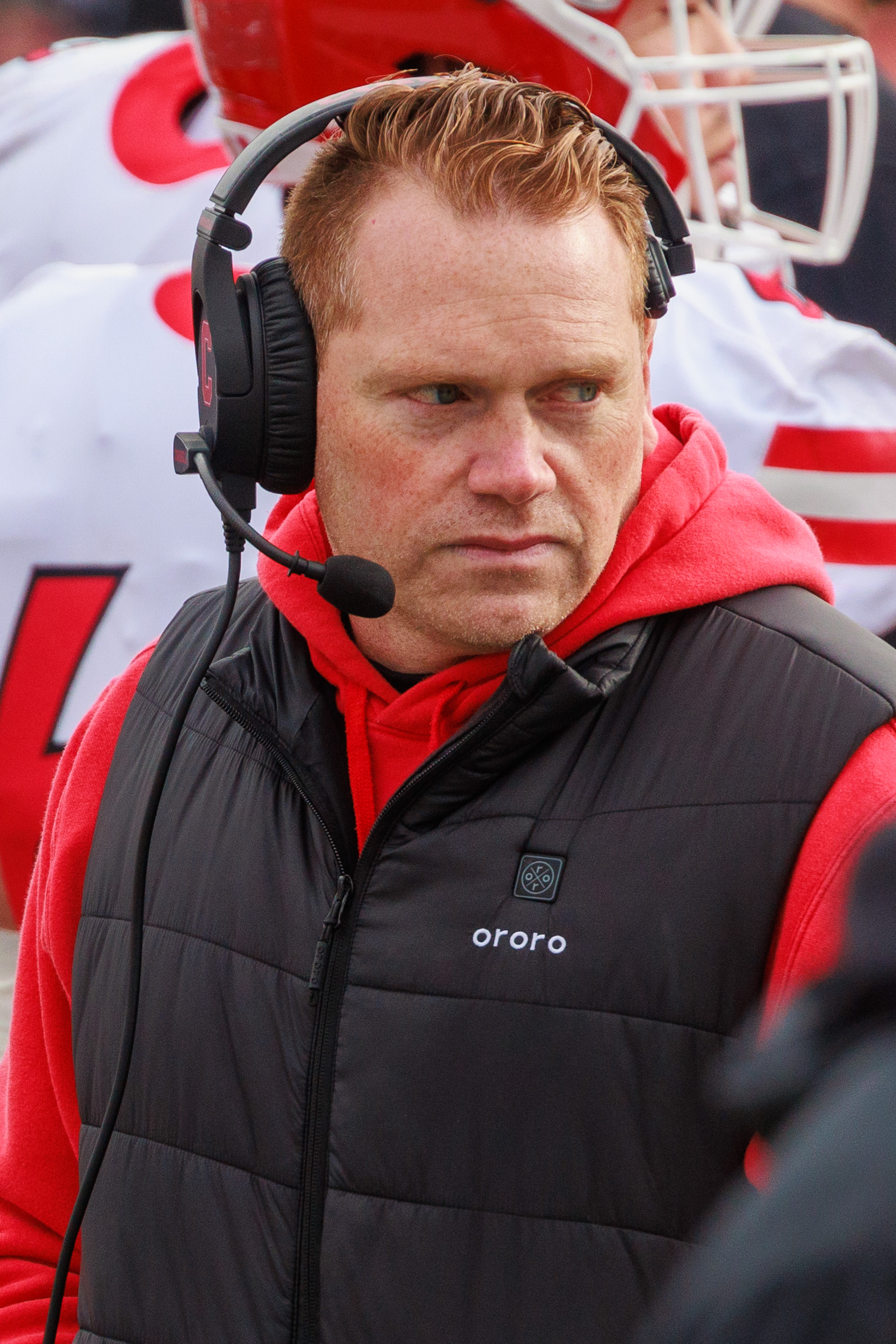
- Swanstrom in 2024

Current position
- Title: Head coach
- Team: Cornell
- Conference: Ivy League
- Record: 11–16

Biographical details
- Born: c. 1982 (age 43–44)
- Education: Rhodes College (2005); University of Redlands (2008)

Playing career
- 2001–2004: Rhodes
- 2005: Darmstadt Diamonds
- Position: Quarterback

Coaching career (HC unless noted)
- 2005: Stratford HS (TX) (assistant)
- 2006–2008: Redlands (QB/WR)
- 2008: Johns Hopkins (QB)
- 2009: Johns Hopkins (OC/QB)
- 2010–2013: Johns Hopkins (AHC/OC/QB)
- 2014–2016: Penn (QB/RC)
- 2017–2021: Ithaca
- 2022–2023: Penn (OC/QB)
- 2024–present: Cornell

Head coaching record
- Overall: 43–27
- Bowls: 1–2

Accomplishments and honors

Championships
- 3 Liberty League (2017–2018, 2021)

Daniel Swanstrom (born c. 1982) is an American college football coach. He is the 28th and current head football coach for Cornell University, a position he has held since the 2024 season. He was the head football coach for Ithaca College from 2017 to 2021.

== Early life ==
Swanstrom played college football for Rhodes College as a quarterback, graduating in 2005, and played professionally for the Darmstadt Diamonds of the German Football League (GFL). At Rhodes, Swanstrom served twice as a team captain. He is a 2019 inductee to the Rhodes Athletic Hall of Fame, having held the program records for passing yards in a single season and total offensive yards at the time of his graduation.

== Coaching career ==
Swanstrom began his football coaching career as an assistant in 2005 at Stratford High School in Texas. Among the players Swanstrom coached at Stratford was future NFL first overall draft pick Andrew Luck. Following his stint at Stratford, Swanstrom entered college coaching as a graduate assistant coach of quarterbacks and wide receivers at Redlands from 2006 to 2007. Swanstrom then joined Johns Hopkins, first as an assistant coach and then as associate head coach and ultimately as offensive coordinator from 2008 to 2013. Following his tenure at Johns Hopkins, Swanstrom began the first of his two stints at Penn, as recruiting and quarterbacks coach from 2014 to 2016.

Swanstrom received his first head coaching position at Division III Ithaca College, where he helped lead the Bombers to a 32–11 record and three Liberty League championships over the course of four seasons of play (the 2020 season having been cancelled). Swanstrom returned to Penn for a second stint, this time as offensive coordinator, from 2022 to 2023. The Cornell Big Red named Swanstrom its next head coach, succeeding David Archer, in December 2023.

== Head coaching record ==
Year	Team	Overall	Conference	Standing	Bowl/playoffs	AFCA^{#}	D3^{°}
Ithaca Bombers (Liberty League) (2017–2021)
2017	Ithaca	8–3	4–1	T–1st	W Whitelaw		
2018	Ithaca	8–3	4–1	T–1st	L Whitelaw		
2019	Ithaca	8–3	4–2	T–2nd	L Bushnell		
2020–21	No team—COVID-19						
2021	Ithaca	8–2	5–1	T–1st		24	21
Ithaca:		32–11	17–4				
Cornell Big Red (Ivy League) (2024–present)
2024	Cornell	4–6	3–4	5th			
2025	Cornell	4–6	3–4	5th			
2026	Cornell	3–4	1–3				
Cornell:		11–16	7–11				
Total:		43–27					
National championship Conference title Conference division title or championship game berth
