= 2026 Penn Quakers football team =

American college football season

2026 Penn Quakers football
- Conference: Ivy League
- Record: 5–5 (3–4 Ivy)
- Head coach: Ricky Santos (1st season)
- Co-offensive coordinators: Ed Borden (1st season); Ryan Wilson (1st season)
- Offensive scheme: Multiple
- Co-defensive coordinators: Nick Della Jacono (1st season); Jaysen Thompson (1st season)
- Base defense: 4–2–5
- Home stadium: Franklin Field

2026 Ivy League football standings
	Conf.			Overall
Team	W		L	W		L
No. 17 Harvard +^	5	–	1	8	–	1
Princeton	4	–	2	6	–	3
Brown	4	–	2	6	–	3
Yale	3	–	3	5	–	4
Dartmouth	3	–	3	4	–	5
Penn	2	–	4	4	–	5
Cornell	2	–	4	4	–	5
Columbia	1	–	5	4	–	5
+ – Conference co-champions; ^ – FCS playoff participant; As of November 22, 2026; Rankings from STATS Poll

The 2026 Penn Quakers football team will represent the University of Pennsylvania as a member of the Ivy League during the 2026 NCAA Division I FCS football season. The team will play its home games at the Franklin Field and they will be led by first-year head coach Ricky Santos.

== Preseason ==
=== Preseason poll ===
On August 3, the Ivy League released its preseason prediction poll. The Quakers were selected to finish fourth in the conference.

== Schedule ==
Date	Time	Opponent	Site	TV	Result	Attendance
September 19	3:00 p.m.	at Bucknell*	Memorial Stadium; Lewisburg, PA	ESPN+	W 20–7	3,360
September 26	1:00 p.m.	No. 6 Lehigh*	Franklin Field; Philadelphia, PA	ESPN+	L 7–20	1,839
October 3	1:30 p.m.	at Dartmouth	Memorial Field; Hanover, NH	ESPN+	L 10–14	5,956
October 10	1:00 p.m.	Howard*	Franklin Field; Philadelphia, PA	ESPN+	W 24–20	5,342
October 16	8:30 p.m.	Columbia	Franklin Field; Philadelphia, Pennsylvania	ESPNU	L 27–28	1,860
October 23	7:00 p.m.	Yale	Franklin Field; Philadelphia, Pennsylvania	ESPNU	W 24–21	5,531
October 31	12:00 p.m.	at Brown	Brown Stadium; Providence, RI	ESPN+	L 17–36	4,183
November 7	1:00 p.m.	at Cornell	Schoellkopf Field; Ithaca, NY (Trustees' Cup)	ESPN+	W 14–13	1,740
November 14	1:00 p.m.	No. 19 Harvard	Franklin, Field; Philadelphia, PA (rivalry)	ESPN+	L 24–38	8,246
November 21	12:00 p.m.	at Princeton	Princeton Stadium; Princeton, NJ (rivalry)	ESPN+	W 19–12	4,297
*Non-conference game; Rankings from STATS Poll released prior to the game; All times are in Eastern time

== Game summaries ==
=== at Bucknell ===
Penn Quakers (0–0) at Bucknell Bison (1–2) – Game summary

Quarter	1	2	3	4	Total
Quakers	14	0	6	0	20
Bison	0	7	0	0	7

at Christy Mathewson–Memorial Stadium • Lewisburg, Pennsylvania

- Date: September 19
- Game time: 3:00 p.m.
- Game weather: Sunny
- Game attendance: 3,360
- Referee: Travis Barta
- TV announcers (ESPN+): Doug Bidsong and Charlie Fisher
- Box score, Recap

Game information

First quarter

- PENN – Miles Teodecki 1-yard run (Mason Walters kick), 3:23. Quakers 7–0. Drive: 12 plays, 85 yards, 5:10.
- PENN – Mason Page 37-yard pass from Miles Teodecki (Mason Walters kick), 0:03. Quakers 14–0. Drive: 4 plays, 50 yards, 1:26.

Second quarter

- BUCK – Nate Olson 77-yard interception return (Juan Garanton kick), 10:12. Quakers 14–7.

Third quarter

- PENN – Dante Barone 10-yard pass from Miles Teodecki (Mason Walters PAT blocked), 3:20. Quakers 20–7. Drive: 8 plays, 53 yards, 5:04.

Fourth quarter

- No scoring plays.

Statistics	PENN	BUCK
First downs	17	6
Plays–yards	79–367	49–124
Rushes–yards	45–170	19–40
Passing yards	197	84
Passing: comp–att–int	18–34–1	11–30–1
Turnovers	2	1
Time of possession	39:40	20:20

Team	Category	Player	Statistics
Penn	Passing	Miles Teodecki	18/34, 197 yards, 2 TD, INT
Penn	Rushing	Miles Teodecki	13 carries, 87 yards, TD
Penn	Receiving	Luke Johnson	6 receptions, 75 yards
Bucknell	Passing	Emmett Dowling	8/21, 76 yards, INT
Bucknell	Rushing	Ty Stauffer	11 carries, 31 yards
Bucknell	Receiving	Sam Milligan	3 receptions, 43 yards

=== No. 6 Lehigh ===
No. 6 Lehigh Mountain Hawks (4–0) at Penn Quakers (1–0) – Game summary

Quarter	1	2	3	4	Total
No. 6 Mountain Hawks	3	0	14	3	20
Quakers	0	0	0	7	7

at Franklin Field • Philadelphia, Pennsylvania

- Date: September 26
- Game time: 1:00 p.m.
- Game weather: Rain • Temperature: 60 °F (16 °C) • Wind: N at 25 miles per hour (40 km/h)
- Game attendance: 1,839
- Referee: Tom Zetts
- TV announcers (ESPN+): Joe Tordy, Joe Valerio and Anna Camden
- Box score, Recap

Game information

First quarter

- LEH – Connor Poole 48-yard field goal, 1:47. Mountain Hawks 3–0. Drive: 9 plays, 22 yards, 4:30.

Second quarter

- No scoring plays.

Third quarter

- LEH – Derek Morgan 11-yard run (Connor Poole kick), 10:37. Mountain Hawks 10–0. Drive: 4 plays, 28 yards, 1:59.
- LEH – Jamaire Harden 20 yd pass from Derek Morgan (Connor Poole kick), 6:16. Mountain Hawks 17–0. Drive: 4 plays, 33 yards, 2:08.

Fourth quarter

- LEH – Connor Poole 29-yard field goal, 10:13. Mountain Hawks 20–0. Drive: 7 plays, 30 yards, 3:56.
- PENN – Tommy Lafayette 1-yard run (Mason Walters kick), 2:14. Mountain Hawks 20–7. Drive: 13 plays, 74 yards, 2:47.

Statistics	LEH	PENN
First downs	14	12
Plays–yards	63–217	67–174
Rushes–yards	47–168	29–41
Passing yards	49	133
Passing: comp–att–int	7–16–0	18–38–2
Turnovers	0	2
Time of possession	32:39	27:21

Team	Category	Player	Statistics
Lehigh	Passing	Derek Morgan	7/16, 49 yards, TD
Lehigh	Rushing	Luke Yoder	19 carries, 74 yards
Lehigh	Receiving	Jamaire Harden	2 receptions, 25 yards
Penn	Passing	Miles Teodecki	18/37, 133 yards, 2 INT
Penn	Rushing	Tommy Lafayette	11 carries, 41 yards, TD
Penn	Receiving	Mason Page	8 receptions, 44 yards

=== at Dartmouth ===
Penn Quakers (1–1) at Dartmouth Big Green (0–2) – Game summary

Quarter	1	2	3	4	Total
Quakers	0	3	0	7	10
Big Green	7	0	0	7	14

at Memorial Field • Hanover, New Hampshire

- Date: October 3
- Game time: 1:30 p.m.
- Game weather: Sunny • Temperature: 61 °F (16 °C)
- Game attendance: 5,956
- Referee: Antonio Marcella
- TV announcers (ESPN+): Matt Corsetti and Jarod Richmond
- Box score, Recap

Game information

First quarter

- DART – KyDric Fisher 16-yard pass from Grayson Saunier (Owen Zalc kick), 3:36. Big Green 7–0. Drive: 13 plays, 80 yards, 7:04.

Second quarter

- PENN – Mason Walters 26-yard field goal, 0:33. Big Green 7–3. Drive: 13 plays, 74 yards, 2:47.

Third quarter

- No scoring plays.

Fourth quarter

- PENN – Donte West 1-yard run (Mason Walters kick), 8:47. Quakers 10–7. Drive: 16 plays, 80 yards, 8:14.
- DART – Myles Craddock 2-yard run (Owen Zalc kick), 4:55. Big Green 14–10. Drive: 8 plays, 75 yards, 3:52.

Statistics	PENN	DART
First downs	22	16
Plays–yards	73–360	50–312
Rushes–yards	34–146	35–139
Passing yards	214	173
Passing: comp–att–int	27–39–0	13–15–0
Turnovers	0	0
Time of possession	32:33	27:27

Team	Category	Player	Statistics
Penn	Passing	Miles Teodecki	27/39, 214 yards
Penn	Rushing	Miles Teodecki	11 carries, 54 yards
Penn	Receiving	Mason Page	8 receptions, 64 yards
Dartmouth	Passing	Grayson Saunier	13/15, 173 yards, TD
Dartmouth	Rushing	Myles Craddock	21 carries, 85 yards
Dartmouth	Receiving	Nick Lemon	3 receptions, 56 yards

=== Howard ===
Howard Bison (2–3) at Penn Quakers (1–2) – Game summary

Quarter	1	2	3	4	Total
Bison	7	10	3	0	20
Quakers	3	7	0	14	24

at Franklin Field • Philadelphia, Pennsylvania

- Date: October 10
- Game time: 1:00 p.m.
- Game weather: Sunny • Temperature: 70 °F (21 °C) • Wind: 11 miles per hour (18 km/h)
- Game attendance: 5,342
- Referee: Bill McKeever
- TV announcers (ESPN+): Joe Tordy, Joe Valerio and Joey Lindstrom
- Box score, Recap

Game information

First quarter

- HOW – Ja'Shawn Scroggins 1-yard run (Matt Conord kick), 5:06. Bison 7–0. Drive: 14 plays, 88 yards, 7:00.
- PENN – Mason Walters 20-yard field goal, 2:00. Bison 7–3. Drive: 9 plays, 55 yards, 2:59.

Second quarter

- PENN – Jack Donnelly 12-yard pass from Karson Siqueiros-Lasky (Mason Walters kick), 7:20. Quakers 10–7. Drive: 9 plays, 44 yards, 5:20.
- HOW – Zaden Jackson 30-yard pass from Ja'Shawn Scroggins (Matt Conord kick), 3:30. Bison 14–10. Drive: 4 plays, 40 yards, 1:22.
- HOW – Matt Conord 20-yard field goal, 0:00. Bison 17–10. Drive: 13 plays, 58 yards, 3:18.

Third quarter

- HOW – Matt Conord 34-yard field goal, 8:41. Bison 20–10. Drive: 14 plays, 71 yards, 6:10.

Fourth quarter

- PENN – Karson Siqueiros-Lasky 6-yard pass from Isaac Lee (Mason Walters kick), 11:55. Bison 20–17. Drive: 13 plays, 87 yards, 6:35.
- PENN – Isaac Lee 13-yard pass from Karson Siqueiros-Lasky (Mason Walters kick), 0:57. Bison 24–20. Drive: 9 plays, 52 yards, 2:15.

Statistics	HOW	PENN
First downs	18	19
Plays–yards	66–247	66–365
Rushes–yards	33–107	22–70
Passing yards	140	295
Passing: comp–att–int	13–33–1	26–44–1
Turnovers	1	2
Time of possession	29:52	30:08

Team	Category	Player	Statistics
Howard	Passing	Ja'Shawn Scroggins	13/33, 140 yards, TD, INT
Howard	Rushing	Billy Robertson	8 carries, 51 yards
Howard	Receiving	Semaj Pierre	6 receptions, 55 yards
Penn	Passing	Karson Siqueiros-Lasky	19/29, 229 yards, 2 TD, INT
Penn	Rushing	Miles Teodecki	2 carries, 48 yards
Penn	Receiving	Ronan Johannson	7 receptions, 113 yards

=== Columbia ===
Columbia Lions (3–1) at Penn Quakers (2–2) – Game summary

Quarter	1	2	3	4	Total
Lions	7	14	0	7	28
Quakers	17	7	3	0	27

at Franklin Field • Philadelphia, Pennsylvania

- Date: October 16
- Game time: 8:30 p.m.
- Game weather: Rain • Temperature: 66 °F (19 °C) • Wind: SE at 21 miles per hour (34 km/h)
- Game attendance: 1,860
- Referee: Justin Ackley
- TV announcers (ESPNU): Eric Forde (play-by-play) and Jack Ford (analyst)
- Box score, Recap

Game information

First quarter

- PENN – Tommy Lafayette 6-yard run (Mason Walters kick), 10:08. Quakers 7–0. Drive: 7 plays, 48 yards, 4:03.
- PENN – Mason Walters 52-yard field goal, 6:01. Quakers 10–0. Drive: 7 plays, 16 yards, 3:08.
- COLU – Bryce Coleman 16-yard pass from Chase Goodwin (Hugo Merry kick), 3:27. Quakers 10–7. Drive: 7 plays, 70 yards, 2:34.
- PENN – Mason Page 19-yard pass from Karson Siqueiros-Lasky (Mason Walters kick), 3:06. Quakers 17–7. Drive: 1 play, 19 yards, 0:08.

Second quarter

- PENN – Dante Barone 20-yard pass from Karson Siqueiros-Lasky (Mason Walters kick), 14:19. Quakers 24–7. Drive: 2 plays, 63 yards, 0:31.
- COLU – Griffin Johnson 3-yard run (Hugo Merry kick), 4:00. Quakers 24–14. Drive: 10 plays, 58 yards, 4:07.
- COLU – Bryce Coleman 11-yard pass from Chase Goodwin (Hugo Merry kick), 1:28. Quakers 24–21. Drive: 6 plays, 48 yards, 0:58.

Third quarter

- PENN – Mason Walters 28-yard field goal, 9:19. Quakers 27–21. Drive: 10 plays, 64 yards, 5:41.

Fourth quarter

- COLU – Bryce Coleman 9-yard pass from Chase Goodwin (Hugo Merry kick), 6:41. Lions 28–27. Drive: 9 plays, 69 yards, 4:08.

Statistics	COLU	PENN
First downs	24	20
Plays–yards	78–362	70–446
Rushes–yards	38–125	29–72
Passing yards	237	374
Passing: comp–att–int	17–40–2	23–41–4
Turnovers	2	4
Time of possession	28:49	31:11

Team	Category	Player	Statistics
Columbia	Passing	Chase Goodwin	17/40, 237 yards, 3 TD, 2 INT
Columbia	Rushing	Griffin Johnson	21 carries, 80 yards, TD
Columbia	Receiving	Bryce Coleman	6 receptions, 90 yards, 3 TD
Penn	Passing	Karson Siqueiros-Lasky	23/41, 374 yards, 2 TD, 4 INT
Penn	Rushing	Tommy Lafayette	11 carries, 36 yards, TD
Penn	Receiving	Isaac Lee	10 receptions, 158 yards

=== Yale ===
Yale Bulldogs (3–2) at Penn Quakers (2–3) – Game summary

Quarter	1	2	3	4	Total
Bulldogs	7	14	0	0	21
Quakers	14	0	0	10	24

at Franklin Field • Philadelphia, Pennsylvania

- Date: October 23
- Game time: 7:00 p.m.
- Game weather: Sunny • Temperature: 58 °F (14 °C)
- Game attendance: 5,531
- Referee: Jeff Pumphrey
- TV announcers (ESPNU): Eric Frede (play-by-play) and Jack Ford (analyst)
- Box score, Recap

Game information

First quarter

- YALE – Lucius Anderson 44-yard pass from Dante Reno (Noah Piper kick), 11:56. Bulldogs 7–0. Drive: 4 plays, 57 yards, 1:42.
- PENN – Jack Donnelly 2-yard pass from Miles Teodecki (Mason Walters kick), 8:13. Tied 7–7. Drive: 8 plays, 75 yards, 3:43.
- PENN – Dante Barone 3-yard pass from Miles Teodecki (Mason Walters kick), 4:38. Quakers 14–7. Drive: 4 plays, 20 yards, 2:06.

Second quarter

- YALE – Hugo Djeumeni Kemeni 34-yard run (Noah Piper kick), 6:47. Tied 14–14. Drive: 2 plays, 35 yards, 0:37.
- YALE – Lucius Anderson 29-yard pass from Dante Reno (Noah Piper kick), 0:20. Bulldogs 21–14. Drive: 7 plays, 70 yards, 2:24.

Third quarter

No scoring plays

Fourth quarter

- PENN – Mason Walters 42-yard field goal, 14:50. Bulldogs 21–17. Drive: 7 plays, 18 yards, 4:06.
- PENN – Sean Williams Jr. 13-yard run (Mason Walters kick), 8:08. Quakers 24–21. Drive: 9 plays, 56 yards, 3:39.

Statistics	YALE	PENN
First downs	18	14
Plays–yards	65–359	67–289
Rushes–yards	31–148	34–133
Passing yards	211	156
Passing: comp–att–int	21–34–4	16–33–0
Turnovers	4	0
Time of possession	27:24	32:36

Team	Category	Player	Statistics
Yale	Passing	Dante Reno	21/34, 211 yards, 2 TD, 4 INT
Yale	Rushing	Hugo Djeumeni Kemeni	20 carries, 107 yards, TD
Yale	Receiving	Lucius Anderson	10 receptions, 133 yards, 2 TD
Penn	Passing	Miles Teodecki	16/33, 156 yards, 2 TD
Penn	Rushing	Sean Williams Jr.	14 carries, 82 yards, TD
Penn	Receiving	Isaac Lee	4 receptions, 63 yards

=== at Brown ===
Penn Quakers (3–3) at Brown Bears (3–3) – Game summary

Quarter	1	2	3	4	Total
Quakers	0	3	0	14	17
Bears	10	7	3	16	36

at Brown Stadium • Providence, Rhode Island

- Date: October 31
- Game time: 12:00 p.m.
- Game weather: Sunny • Temperature: 56 °F (13 °C) • Wind: NW at 10 miles per hour (16 km/h)
- Game attendance: 4,183
- Referee: Alexander Randolph
- TV announcers (ESPN+): Scott Cordischi (play-by-play), John Color (analyst) and Nick Coit (sideline)
- Box score, Recap

Game information

First quarter

- BRWN – Drew Crabtree 40-yard field goal, 10:24. Bears 3–0. Drive: 8 plays, 26 yards, 2:56.
- BRWN – Matt Childs 1-yard run (Drew Crabtree kick), 3:44. Bears 10–0. Drive: 10 plays, 51 yards, 4:04.

Second quarter

- BRWN – Carson Hill 15-yard pass from James Murphy (Drew Crabtree kick), 11:31. Bears 17–0. Drive: 10 plays, 57 yards, 4:43.
- PENN – Mason Walters 53-yard field goal, 0:24. Bears 17–3. Drive: 7 plays, 10 yards, 0:50.

Third quarter

- BRWN – Drew Crabtree 24-yard field goal, 5:02. Bears 20–3. Drive: 16 plays, 80 yards, 7:41.

Fourth quarter

- PENN – Isaac Lee 3-yard pass from Karson Siqueiros-Lasky (Mason Walters kick), 12:57. Bears 20–10. Drive: 10 plays, 74 yards, 3:08.
- BRWN – Drew Crabtree 31-yard field goal, 5:14. Bears 23–10. Drive: 12 plays, 62 yards, 7:43.
- BRWN – Jackson Bennett 18-yard run, 3:13. Bears 29–10. Drive: 3 plays, 29 yards, 1:05.
- PENN – Mason Page 20-yard pass from Karson Siqueiros-Lasky (Mason Walters kick), 0:49. Bears 29–17. Drive: 11 plays, 62 yards, 2:19.
- BRWN – Max Malo 45-yard kickoff return (Drew Crabtree kick), 0:43. Bears 36–17.

Statistics	PENN	BRWN
First downs	14	19
Plays–yards	70–298	75–380
Rushes–yards	23–56	49–148
Passing yards	242	232
Passing: comp–att–int	25–47–1	16–26–1
Turnovers	2	2
Time of possession	24:49	35:11

Team	Category	Player	Statistics
Penn	Passing	Karson Siqueiros-Lasky	18/26, 193 yards, 2 TD, INT
Penn	Rushing	Miles Teodecki	6 carries, 31 yards
Penn	Receiving	Isaac Lee	7 receptions, 76 yards, TD
Brown	Passing	James Murphy	15/25, 230 yards, TD, INT
Brown	Rushing	Matt Childs	21 carries, 75 yards, TD
Brown	Receiving	Jadon Garza-Pender	4 receptions, 48 yards

=== at Cornell (Trustee's Cup) ===
Penn Quakers (3–4) at Cornell Big Red (3–4) – Game summary

Quarter	1	2	3	4	Total
Quakers	0	7	7	0	14
Big Red	7	3	3	0	13

at Schoellkopf Field • Ithaca, New York

- Date: November 7
- Game time: 1:00 p.m.
- Game weather: Rain • Temperature: 47 °F (8 °C) • Wind: SW at 4 miles per hour (6.4 km/h)
- Game attendance: 1,740
- Referee: Jay Johnson
- TV announcers (ESPN+): Nick DeLuca (play-by-play) and Matt Miller (analyst)
- Box score, Recap

Game information

First quarter

- COR – Jordan Triplett 1-yard run (Caden Lesiewicz kick), 5:44. Big Red 7–0. Drive: 15 plays, 75 yards, 9:12.

Second quarter

- COR – Caden Lesiewicz 27-yard field goal, 3:46. Big Red 10–0. Drive: 11 plays, 57 yards, 5:49.
- PENN – Ronan Johannson 6-yard pass from Karson Siqueiros-Lasky (Mason Walters kick), 1:18. Big Red 10–7. Drive: 7 plays, 68 yards, 2:22.

Third quarter

- COR – Caden Lesiewicz 34-yard field goal, 3:39. Big Red 13–7. Drive: 4 plays, -2 yards, 2:04.
- PENN – Sean Williams Jr. 2-yard run (Mason Walters kick), 0:29. Quakers 14–13. Drive: 9 plays, 77 yards, 3:05.

Fourth quarter

No scoring plays

Statistics	PENN	COR
First downs	17	15
Plays–yards	67–258	64–239
Rushes–yards	28–38	38–158
Passing yards	220	81
Passing: comp–att–int	24–39–0	9–26–0
Turnovers	0	0
Time of possession	29:35	30:25

Team	Category	Player	Statistics
Penn	Passing	Karson Siqueiros-Lasky	24/38, 220 yards, TD
Penn	Rushing	Sean Williams Jr.	18 carries, 55 yards, TD
Penn	Receiving	Isaac Lee	9 receptions, 106 yards
Cornell	Passing	Michael McColgan	5/22, 47 yards
Cornell	Rushing	Michael McColgan	16 carries, 83 yards
Cornell	Receiving	Brendan Lee	4 receptions, 36 yards

=== No. 19 Harvard (rivalry) ===
No. 19 Harvard Crimson (7–1) at Penn Quakers (4–4) – Game summary

Quarter	1	2	3	4	Total
No. 19 Crimson	10	7	7	14	38
Quakers	0	24	0	0	24

at Franklin Field • Philadelphia, Pennsylvania

- Date: November 14
- Game time: 1:00 p.m.
- Game weather: Sunny • Temperature: 46 °F (8 °C) • Wind: E at 11 miles per hour (18 km/h)
- Game attendance: 8,246
- Referee: Antonio Marcella
- TV announcers (ESPN+): Jon Gross (play-by-play), Joe Valerio (analyst) and Jack Miller (sideline)
- Box score, Recap

Game information

First quarter

- HARV – Cole Allen 22-yard pass from Charlie Smith (Kieran Corr kick), 11:58. Crimson 7–0. Drive: 8 plays, 78 yards, 2:47.
- HARV – Kieran Corr 40-yard field goal, 0:55. Crimson 10–0. Drive: 17 plays, 60 yards, 8:14.

Second quarter

- PENN – Mason Walters 23-yard field goal, 10:51. Crimson 10–3. Drive: 11 plays, 70 yards, 5:04.
- HARV – Nathan Bailey 14-yard pass from Charlie Smith (Kieran Corr kick), 5:17. Crimson 17–3. Drive: 10 plays, 74 yards, 5:29.
- PENN – Ronan Johannson 69-yard pass from Karson Siqueiros-Lasky (Mason Walters kick), 3:34. Crimson 17–10. Drive: 3 plays, 75 yards, 1:43.
- PENN – Ben Wable 0-yard punt return (Mason Walters kick), 1:08. Tied 17–17.
- PENN – Zach Darche 37-yard interception (Mason Walters kick), 0:53. Quakers 24–17.

Third quarter

- HARV – Nathan Bailey 34-yard pass from Charlie Smith (Kieran Corr kick), 6:55. Tied 24–24. Drive: 1 play, 34 yards, 0:07.

Fourth quarter

- HARV – Xaviah Bascon 5-yard run (Kieran Corr kick), 12:17. Crimson 31–24. Drive: 6 plays, 34 yards, 3:31.
- HARV – Kise Flannery 2-yard run (Kieran Corr kick), 4:25. Crimson 38–24. Drive: 10 plays, 77 yards, 6:12.

Statistics	HARV	PENN
First downs	22	15
Plays–yards	70–374	55–287
Rushes–yards	42–175	24–48
Passing yards	199	239
Passing: comp–att–int	18–28–1	19–31–0
Turnovers	1	1
Time of possession	33:51	26:09

Team	Category	Player	Statistics
Harvard	Passing	Charlie Smith	18/28, 199 yards, 3 TD, INT
Harvard	Rushing	Xaviah Bascon	18 carries, 104 yards, TD
Harvard	Receiving	Nathan Bailey	13 receptions, 113 yards, 2 TD
Penn	Passing	Karson Siqueiros-Lasky	15/23, 210 yards, TD
Penn	Rushing	Sean Williams Jr.	13 carries, 42 yards
Penn	Receiving	Ronan Johannson	2 receptions, 69 yards, TD

=== at Princeton (rivalry) ===
Penn Quakers (4–5) at Princeton Tigers (6–3) – Game summary

Quarter	1	2	3	4	Total
Quakers	0	0	0	0	0
Tigers	0	0	0	0	0

at Princeton Stadium • Princeton, New Jersey

- Date: November 21
- Game time: 12:00 p.m.
- TV: ESPN+

Game information

First quarter
Second quarter
Third quarter
Fourth quarter

Statistics	PENN	PRIN
First downs		
Plays–yards		
Rushes–yards		
Passing yards		
Passing: comp–att–int		
Turnovers		
Time of possession		

Team	Category	Player	Statistics
Penn	Passing		
Penn	Rushing		
Penn	Receiving		
Princeton	Passing		
Princeton	Rushing		
Princeton	Receiving		
