= 2026 Yale Bulldogs football team =

American college football season

2026 Yale Bulldogs football
- Conference: Ivy League
- Record: 6–4 (4–3 Ivy)
- Head coach: Kevin Cahill (1st season)
- Offensive coordinator: Chris Ostrowsky (4th season)
- Defensive coordinator: Sean McGowan (9th season)
- Co-defensive coordinator: Paul Rice (1st season)
- Home stadium: Yale Bowl

2026 Ivy League football standings
	Conf.			Overall
Team	W		L	W		L
No. 17 Harvard $^	5	–	2	8	–	2
Yale	4	–	3	6	–	4
Princeton	4	–	3	6	–	4
Dartmouth	4	–	3	5	–	5
Brown	4	–	3	6	–	4
Penn	3	–	4	5	–	5
Columbia	2	–	5	5	–	5
Cornell	2	–	5	4	–	6
$ – Conference champion; ^ – FCS playoff participant; As of November 22, 2026; Rankings from STATS Poll

The 2026 Yale Bulldogs football team will represent Yale University as a member of the Ivy League during the 2026 NCAA Division I FCS football season. The team will play its home games at the Yale Bowl and they will be led by first-year head coach Kevin Cahill. Preseason honors included captain Abu Kamara being named to the Stats Perform FCS Preseason All-America Team, the Buck Buchanan Award Preseason Watch List and by Phil Steele as the Ivy League Preseason Defensive Player of the Year; and quarterback Dante Reno being named to the Walter Payton Award Preseason Watch List.

== Schedule ==
Date	Time	Opponent	Rank	Site	TV	Result	Attendance
September 19	2:00 p.m.	at Holy Cross*	No. 19	Fitton Field; Worcester, MA	ESPN+	W 38–28	17,623
September 26	1:00 p.m.	at Cornell	No. 17	Schoellkopf Field; Ithaca, NY	ESPN+	L 25–38	12,542
October 3	12:00 p.m.	Merrimack*		Yale Bowl; New Haven, CT	ESPN+	W 41–24	4,022
October 10	12:00 p.m.	Dartmouth		Yale Bowl; New Haven, CT	ESPNU	W 28–7	6,320
October 17	12:00 p.m.	Rhode Island*	No. 25	Yale Bowl; New Haven, CT	ESPN+	L 23–41	4,315
October 23	7:00 p.m.	at Penn		Franklin Field; Philadelphia, PA	ESPNU	L 21–24	5,531
October 31	12:00 p.m.	at Columbia		Lawrence A. Wien Stadium; New York, NY	ESPN+	W 26–8	3,024
November 7	12:00 p.m.	Brown		Yale Bowl; New Haven, CT	ESPN+	L 20–24	4,273
November 14	12:00 p.m.	No. 25 Princeton		Yale Bowl; New Haven, CT (rivalry)	ESPN+	W 28–0	6,440
November 21	3:30 p.m.	at No. 17 Harvard		Fenway Park; Boston, MA (rivalry)	ESPNU	W 20–17	32,104
*Non-conference game; Rankings from STATS Poll released prior to the game; All times are in Eastern time; Source:

== Preseason ==
=== Preseason poll ===
On August 3, the Ivy League released its preseason prediction poll. The Bulldogs were predicted to finish first in the conference.

== Rankings ==
Ranking movements Legend: ██ Increase in ranking ██ Decrease in ranking — = Not ranked RV = Received votes
	Week														
Poll	Pre	1	2	3	4	5	6	7	8	9	10	11	12	13	Final
STATS	18	16	19	19	17	RV	RV	25	—						
Coaches	19	18	19	20	18	RV	RV	23	RV						

== Game summaries ==
=== at Holy Cross ===
No. 19 Yale Bulldogs (0–0) at Holy Cross Crusaders (0–3) – Game summary

Quarter	1	2	3	4	Total
No. 19 Bulldogs	7	0	14	17	38
Crusaders	7	0	7	14	28

at Fitton Field • Worcester, Massachusetts

- Date: September 19
- Game time: 2:00 p.m.
- Game attendance: 17,623
- TV: ESPN+

Game information

First quarter

- Jaxton Santiago 75 Yd pass from Dante Reno, (Noah Piper Kick). 10:07. Yale 7-0 Drive: 5 plays, 88 yards, 1:54
- David Lynch 1 Yd Run, (Owen Saraceno Kick). 5:52. Tied 7-7 'Drive: 9 plays, 52 yards, 4:07

Third quarter

- Lucius Anderson 22 Yd pass from Reno, (Saraceno Kick). 13:14. Drive: 5 plays, 60 yards, 1:39
- Mason McSweeney 9 Yd pass from Jake Croce, (Saraceno Kick). 9:11. Tied 14-14, Drive: 8 plays, 70 yards, 4:03
- Anderson 26 Yd pass from Reno, (Piper Kick). 4:36. Yale 21-14, Drive: 11 plays, 76 yards, 4:29

Fourth quarter

- Lincoln Fisher 31 Yd pass from Lynch, (Saraceno Kick). 14:51. Tied 21-21, Drive: 7 plays, 44 yards, 3:08
- Fisher 28 Yd pass from Lynch, (Saraceno Kick). 11:52. Holy Cross 28-21, Drive: 3 plays, 34 yards, 0:55
- Santiago 18 Yd pass from Reno, (Piper Kick). 9:36. Tied 28-28, Drive: 6 plays, 63 yards, 2:09
- Graham Smith 28 Yd pass from Reno, (Piper Kick). 3:42. Yale 35-28, Drive: 3 plays, 53 yards, 1:07
- Piper 17 Yd Field Goal. 1:41. Yale 38-28, Drive: 6 plays, 27 yards, 01:40

Statistics	YALE	HC
First downs	22	16
Plays–yards	73–524	71–308
Rushes–yards	30–70	31–155
Passing yards	454	153
Passing: Comp–Att–Int	30–40–0	17–40–1
Turnovers	1	1
Time of possession	29:34	30:26

Team	Category	Player	Statistics
Yale	Passing	Dante Reno	30/43, 454 yards, 5 TD
Yale	Rushing	Hugo Djeumeni Kemeni	12 carries, 54 yards
Yale	Receiving	Jaxton Santiago	12 receptions, 234 yards, 2 TD
Holy Cross	Passing	David Lynch	16/38, 144 yards, 2 TD, INT
Holy Cross	Rushing	Joseph Williams	16 carries, 120 yards
Holy Cross	Receiving	Lincoln Fisher	2 receptions, 59 yards, 2 TD

=== at Cornell ===
No. 17 Yale Bulldogs (1–0) at Cornell Big Red (0–1) – Game summary

Quarter	1	2	3	4	Total
No. 17 Bulldogs	0	0	0	0	0
Big Red	0	0	0	0	0

at Schoellkopf Field • Ithaca, New York

- Date: September 26
- Game time: 1:00 p.m.

Game information

First quarter
Second quarter
Third quarter
Fourth quarter

Statistics	YALE	COR
First downs		
Plays–yards		
Rushes–yards		
Passing yards		
Passing: comp–att–int		
Turnovers		
Time of possession		

Team	Category	Player	Statistics
Yale	Passing		
Yale	Rushing		
Yale	Receiving		
Cornell	Passing		
Cornell	Rushing		
Cornell	Receiving		

=== Merrimack ===
Merrimack Warriors (2–3) at Yale Bulldogs (1–1) – Game summary

Quarter	1	2	3	4	Total
Warriors	0	0	0	0	0
Bulldogs	0	0	0	0	0

at Yale Bowl • New Haven, Connecticut

- Date: October 3

Game information

First quarter
Second quarter
Third quarter
Fourth quarter

Statistics	MRMK	YALE
First downs		
Plays–yards		
Rushes–yards		
Passing yards		
Passing: comp–att–int		
Turnovers		
Time of possession		

Team	Category	Player	Statistics
Merrimack	Passing		
Merrimack	Rushing		
Merrimack	Receiving		
Yale	Passing		
Yale	Rushing		
Yale	Receiving		

=== Dartmouth ===
Dartmouth Big Green (1–2) at Yale Bulldogs (2–1) – Game summary

Quarter	1	2	3	4	Total
Big Green	0	0	0	0	0
Bulldogs	0	0	0	0	0

at Yale Bowl • New Haven, Connecticut

- Date: October 10
- Game time: 12:00 p.m.

Game information

First quarter
Second quarter
Third quarter
Fourth quarter

Statistics	DART	YALE
First downs		
Plays–yards		
Rushes–yards		
Passing yards		
Passing: comp–att–int		
Turnovers		
Time of possession		

Team	Category	Player	Statistics
Dartmouth	Passing		
Dartmouth	Rushing		
Dartmouth	Receiving		
Yale	Passing		
Yale	Rushing		
Yale	Receiving		

=== Rhode Island ===
Rhode Island Rams (3–3) at No. 25 Yale Bulldogs (3–1) – Game summary

Quarter	1	2	3	4	Total
Rams	0	0	0	0	0
No. 25 Bulldogs	0	0	0	0	0

at Yale Bowl • New Haven, Connecticut

- Date: October 17
- Game time: 12:00 p.m.

Game information

First quarter
Second quarter
Third quarter
Fourth quarter

Statistics	URI	YALE
First downs		
Plays–yards		
Rushes–yards		
Passing yards		
Passing: comp–att–int		
Turnovers		
Time of possession		

Team	Category	Player	Statistics
Rhode Island	Passing		
Rhode Island	Rushing		
Rhode Island	Receiving		
Yale	Passing		
Yale	Rushing		
Yale	Receiving		

=== at Penn ===
Yale Bulldogs (3–2) at Penn Quakers (2–3) – Game summary

Quarter	1	2	3	4	Total
Bulldogs	7	14	0	0	21
Quakers	14	0	0	10	24

at Franklin Field • Philadelphia, Pennsylvania

- Date: October 23
- Game time: 7:00 p.m.
- Game weather: Sunny • Temperature: 58 °F (14 °C)
- Game attendance: 5,531
- Referee: Jeff Pumphrey
- TV announcers (ESPNU): Eric Frede (play-by-play) and Jack Ford (analyst)

Game information

First quarter

- YALE – Lucius Anderson 44-yard pass from Dante Reno (Noah Piper kick), 11:56. Bulldogs 7–0. Drive: 4 plays, 57 yards, 1:42.
- PENN – Jack Donnelly 2-yard pass from Miles Teodecki (Mason Walters kick), 8:13. Tied 7–7. Drive: 8 plays, 75 yards, 3:43.
- PENN – Dante Barone 3-yard pass from Miles Teodecki (Mason Walters kick), 4:38. Quakers 14–7. Drive: 4 plays, 20 yards, 2:06.

Second quarter

- YALE – Hugo Djeumeni Kemeni 34-yard run (Noah Piper kick), 6:47. Tied 14–14. Drive: 2 plays, 35 yards, 0:37.
- YALE – Lucius Anderson 29-yard pass from Dante Reno (Noah Piper kick), 0:20. Bulldogs 21–14. Drive: 7 plays, 70 yards, 2:24.

Third quarter

No scoring plays

Fourth quarter

- PENN – Mason Walters 42-yard field goal, 14:50. Bulldogs 21–17. Drive: 7 plays, 18 yards, 4:06.
- PENN – Sean Williams Jr. 13-yard run (Mason Walters kick), 8:08. Quakers 24–21. Drive: 9 plays, 56 yards, 3:39.

Statistics	YALE	PENN
First downs	18	14
Plays–yards	65–359	67–289
Rushes–yards	31–148	34–133
Passing yards	211	156
Passing: Comp–Att–Int	21–34–4	16–33–0
Turnovers	4	0
Time of possession	27:24	32:36

Team	Category	Player	Statistics
Yale	Passing	Dante Reno	21/34, 211 yards, 2 TD, 4 INT
Yale	Rushing	Hugo Djeumeni Kemeni	20 carries, 107 yards, TD
Yale	Receiving	Lucius Anderson	10 receptions, 133 yards, 2 TD
Penn	Passing	Miles Teodecki	16/33, 156 yards, 2 TD
Penn	Rushing	Sean Williams Jr.	14 carries, 82 yards, TD
Penn	Receiving	Isaac Lee	4 receptions, 63 yards

=== at Columbia ===
Yale Bulldogs (3–3) at Columbia Lions (4–2) – Game summary

Quarter	1	2	3	4	Total
Bulldogs	0	16	7	3	26
Lions	0	0	8	0	8

at Lawrence A. Wien Stadium • Manhattan, New York

- Date: October 31
- Game time: 12:00 p.m.
- Game weather: Sunny • Temperature: 56 °F (13 °C) • Wind: NW at 8 miles per hour (13 km/h)
- Game attendance: 3,024
- Referee: Tom Zetts
- TV announcers (ESPN+): Lance Medow (play-by-play) and Shawn FitzGerald (analyst)

Game information

First quarter

No scoring plays

Second quarter

- YALE – Graham Smith 23-yard pass from Dante Reno (Noah Piper kick), 13:41. Bulldogs 7–0. Drive: 9 plays, 67 yards, 4:04.
- YALE – Phoenix Grant 0-yard safety, 13:31. Bulldogs 9–0.
- YALE – Lucius Anderson 34-yard pass from Dante Reno (Noah Piper kick), 10:34. Bulldogs 16–0. Drive: 6 plays, 68 yards, 2:51.

Third quarter

- YALE – Hugo Djeumeni Kemeni 63-yard run (Noah Piper kick), 13:23. Bulldogs 23–0. Drive: 4 plays, 85 yards, 1:30.
- COLU – Bryce Coleman 11-yard pass from Chase Goodwin (Bryce Coleman pass), 1:33. Bulldogs 23–8. Drive: 11 plays, 70 yards, 5:15.

Fourth quarter

- YALE – Noah Piper 46-yard field goal, 4:08. Bulldogs 26–8. Drive: 4 plays, 7 yards, 1:06.

Statistics	YALE	COLU
First downs	16	23
Plays–yards	72–356	69–241
Rushes–yards	41–222	21–34
Passing yards	134	207
Passing: Comp–Att–Int	14–31–0	24–48–1
Turnovers	0	1
Time of possession	33:41	26:27

Team	Category	Player	Statistics
Yale	Passing	Dante Reno	14/31, 134 yards, 2 TD
Yale	Rushing	Hugo Djeumeni Kemeni	23 carries, 155 yards, TD
Yale	Receiving	Lucius Anderson	5 receptions, 56 yards, TD
Columbia	Passing	Chase Goodwin	24/48, 207 yards, TD, INT
Columbia	Rushing	Griffin Johnson	8 carries, 16 yards
Columbia	Receiving	Bryce Coleman	10 receptions, 108 yards, TD

=== Brown ===
Brown Bears (4–3) at Yale Bulldogs (4–3) – Game summary

Quarter	1	2	3	4	Total
Bears	0	0	0	0	0
Bulldogs	0	0	0	0	0

at Yale Bowl • New Haven, Connecticut

- Date: November 7
- Game time: 12:00 p.m.

Game information

First quarter
Second quarter
Third quarter
Fourth quarter

Statistics	BRWN	YALE
First downs		
Plays–yards		
Rushes–yards		
Passing yards		
Passing: comp–att–int		
Turnovers		
Time of possession		

Team	Category	Player	Statistics
Brown	Passing		
Brown	Rushing		
Brown	Receiving		
Yale	Passing		
Yale	Rushing		
Yale	Receiving		

=== No. 25 Princeton (rivalry) ===
No. 25 Princeton Tigers (6–2) at Yale Bulldogs (4–4) – Game summary

Quarter	1	2	3	4	Total
No. 25 Tigers	0	0	0	0	0
Bulldogs	0	0	0	0	0

at Yale Bowl • New Haven, Connecticut

- Date: November 14
- Game time: 12:00 p.m.

Game information

First quarter
Second quarter
Third quarter
Fourth quarter

Statistics	PRIN	YALE
First downs		
Plays–yards		
Rushes–yards		
Passing yards		
Passing: comp–att–int		
Turnovers		
Time of possession		

Team	Category	Player	Statistics
Princeton	Passing		
Princeton	Rushing		
Princeton	Receiving		
Yale	Passing		
Yale	Rushing		
Yale	Receiving		

=== vs. No. 17 Harvard (The Game) ===
Yale Bulldogs (5–4) vs. No. 17 Harvard Crimson (8–1) – Game summary

Quarter	1	2	3	4	Total
Bulldogs	0	0	0	0	0
No. 17 Crimson	0	0	0	0	0

at Fenway Park • Boston, Massachusetts

- Date: November 21
- Game time: 3:30 p.m.

Game information

First quarter
Second quarter
Third quarter
Fourth quarter

Statistics	YALE	HARV
First downs		
Plays–yards		
Rushes–yards		
Passing yards		
Passing: comp–att–int		
Turnovers		
Time of possession		

Team	Category	Player	Statistics
Yale	Passing		
Yale	Rushing		
Yale	Receiving		
Harvard	Passing		
Harvard	Rushing		
Harvard	Receiving		
