= 2026 Columbia Lions football team =

American college football season

2026 Columbia Lions football
- Conference: Ivy League
- Record: 5–5 (2–5 Ivy)
- Head coach: Jon Poppe (3rd season)
- Offensive coordinator: Seitu Smith (3rd season)
- Offensive scheme: Pro-style
- Defensive coordinator: Ryan Osborn (1st season)
- Base defense: 3–4
- Captain: Caleb Solomon; Charlie Newton
- Home stadium: Robert K. Kraft Field at Lawrence A. Wien Stadium

2026 Ivy League football standings
	Conf.			Overall
Team	W		L	W		L
No. 17 Harvard +^	5	–	1	8	–	1
Princeton	4	–	2	6	–	3
Brown	4	–	2	6	–	3
Yale	3	–	3	5	–	4
Dartmouth	3	–	3	4	–	5
Penn	2	–	4	4	–	5
Cornell	2	–	4	4	–	5
Columbia	1	–	5	4	–	5
+ – Conference co-champions; ^ – FCS playoff participant; As of November 22, 2026; Rankings from STATS Poll

The 2026 Columbia Lions football team represents Columbia University as a member of the Ivy League during 2026 NCAA Division I FCS football season. The Lions are led by third-year head coach Jon Poppe and play home games at Robert K. Kraft Field at Lawrence A. Wien Stadium.

== Preseason ==
=== Preseason poll ===
On August 3, the Ivy League released its preseason prediction poll. The Lions were predicted to finish last in the conference.

== Schedule ==
Date	Time	Opponent	Site	TV	Result	Attendance
September 19	12:00 p.m.	Lafayette*	Robert K. Kraft Field at Lawrence A. Wien Stadium; New York, NY	ESPN+	W 40–34 ^{OT}	3,728
September 26	12:30 p.m.	at Georgetown*	Cooper Field; Washington, D.C. (Lou Little Cup)	ESPN+	W 20–17 ^{OT}	1,684
October 3	12:00 p.m.	Princeton	Robert K. Kraft Field at Lawrence A. Wien Stadium; New York, NY	ESPN+	L 7–35	3,676
October 9	7:00 p.m.	at Marist*	Tenney Stadium at Leonidoff Field; Poughkeepsie, NY	ESPN+	W 41–28	1,141
October 16	8:30 p.m.	at Penn	Franklin Field; Philadelphia, PA	ESPNU	W 28–27	1,860
October 24	1:30 p.m.	Dartmouth^{†}	Robert K. Kraft Field at Lawrence A. Wien Stadium; New York, NY	ESPN+	L 18–38	12,932
October 31	12:00 p.m.	Yale	Robert K. Kraft Field at Lawrence A. Wien Stadium; New York, NY	ESPN+	L 8–26	3,024
November 7	1:00 p.m.	at No. 19т Harvard	Harvard Stadium; Boston, MA	ESPN+	L 0–37	
November 14	12:00 p.m.	at Brown	Richard Gouse Field at Brown Stadium; Providence, RI	ESPN+	L 20–28	3,008
November 21	12:00 p.m.	Cornell	Robert K. Kraft Field at Lawrence A. Wien Stadium; New York, NY (rivalry)	ESPN+	W 46–45 ^{OT}	4,065
*Non-conference game; ^{†}Homecoming; Rankings from STATS Poll released prior to the game; All times are in Eastern time

== Game summaries ==
=== Lafayette ===
Lafayette Leopards (1–1) at Columbia Lions (0–0) – Game summary

Quarter	1	2	3	4	OT	Total
Leopards	3	7	7	17	0	34
Lions	7	10	7	10	6	40

at Lawrence A. Wien Stadium • New York, New York

- Date: September 19
- Game time: 12:00 p.m. EDT
- Game weather: Sunny • Temperature: 67 °F (19 °C) • Wind: E at 8 miles per hour (13 km/h)
- Game attendance: 3,728
- Referee: Alexander Randolph
- TV announcers (ESPN+): Lance Meadow (play-by-play) and CJ Brown (analyst)
- Report: Official report

Game information
First quarter
- COLU – Bryce Coleman 2-yard pass from Xander Menapace (Hugo Merry kick), 11:23. Lions 7–0. Drive: 9 plays, 75 yards, 3:37.
- LAF – Jack Simonetta 40-yard field goal, 8:01. Lions 7–3. Drive: 8 plays, 43 yards, 3:18.

Second quarter

- COLU – Xander Menapace 1-yard run (Hugo Merry kick), 6:45. Lions 14–3. 'Drive: 6 plays, 30 yards, 3:16.
- LAF – Zane Wooldridge 16-yard pass from Daniel Lipovski (Jack Simonetta kick), 3:20. Lions 14–10. Drive: 8 plays, 75 yards, 3:25.
- COLU – Hugo Merry 25-yard field goal, 0:00. Lions 17–10. Drive: 7 plays, 76 yards, 0:49.

Third quarter

- LAF – Jakyre Henley 24-yard run (Jack Simonetta kick), 11:20. Tied 17–17. Drive: 9 plays, 70 yards, 3:34.
- COLU – Griffin Johnson 1-yard run (Hugo Merry kick), 2:45. Lions 24–17. Drive: 8 plays, 89 yards, 4:28.

Fourth quarter

- COLU – Bryce Coleman 15-yard pass from Chase Goodwin (Hugo Merry kick), 14:05. Lions 31–17. Drive: 7 plays, 52 yards, 2:02.
- LAF – Carson Persing 14-yard pass from Daniel Lipovski (Jack Simonetta kick), 9:27. Lions 31–24. Drive: 10 plays, 66 yards, 4:33.
- LAF – Sean Curtis 23-yard fumble recovery (Jack Simonetta kick), 8:12. Tied 31–31.
- COLU – Hugo Merry 21-yard field goal, 4:20. Lions 34–31. Drive: 8 plays, 72 yards, 3:49.
- LAF – Jack Simonetta 31-yard field goal, 1:03. Tied 34–34. Drive: 11 plays, 61 yards, 3:17.

Overtime

- COLU – Beckett Robinson 25-yard pass from Chase Goodwin. Lions 40–34. Drive: 1 play, 25 yards.

Statistics	LAF	COLU
First downs	20	28
Plays–yards	68–338	76–524
Rushes–yards	39–211	36–155
Passing yards	127	369
Passing: comp–att–int	14–29–2	26–40–0
Turnovers	2	1
Time of possession	27:50	32:10

Team	Category	Player	Statistics
Lafayette	Passing	Daniel Lipovski	13/28, 127 yards, 2 TD, 2 INT
Lafayette	Rushing	Jakyre Henley	17 carries, 125 yards, TD
Lafayette	Receiving	Mason Kuehner	6 receptions, 58 yards
Columbia	Passing	Chase Goodwin	25/39, 367 yards, 2 TD
Columbia	Rushing	Griffin Johnson	19 carries, 124 yards, TD
Columbia	Receiving	Bryce Coleman	7 receptions, 127 yards, 2 TD

=== at Georgetown ===
Columbia Lions (1–0) at Georgetown Hoyas (0–2) – Game summary

Quarter	1	2	3	4	OT	Total
Lions	7	3	0	7	3	20
Hoyas	0	7	10	0	0	17

at Cooper Field • Washington, D.C.

- Date: September 26
- Game time: 12:30 p.m. EDT
- Game weather: Cloudy • Temperature: 67 °F (19 °C)
- Game attendance: 1,684
- Referee: Terry Jones
- TV announcers (ESPN+): Jeremy Huber (play-by-play)
- Report: Official report

Game information
First quarter
- COLU – Braden Dougherty 16-yard pass from Chase Goodwin (Hugo Merry kick), 0:55. Lions 7–0. Drive: 14 plays, 83 yards, 7:34.

Second quarter

- GTWN – Burke Carroll 26-yard pass from Jack Johnson (Thomas Anderson kick), 8:10. Tied 7–7. Drive: 5 plays, 82 yards, 2:03.
- COLU – Hugo Merry 38-yard field goal, 0:24. Lions 10–7. Drive: 8 plays, 60 yards, 2:37.

Third quarter

- GTWN – Hassan Mahasin 71-yard punt return (Thomas Anderson kick), 10:05. Hoyas 14–10.
- GTWN – Thomas Anderson 23-yard field goal, 2:04. Hoyas 17–10. Drive: 8 plays, 70 yards, 3:48.

Fourth quarter

- COLU – Bryce Coleman 2-yard pass from Chase Goodwin (Hugo Merry kick), 13:11. Tied 17–17. Drive: 11 plays, 80 yards, 3:48.

Overtime

- COLU – Hugo Merry 25-yard field goal. Lions 20–17. Drive: 6 plays, 18 yards.

Statistics	COLU	GTWN
First downs	27	10
Plays–yards	91–431	49–234
Rushes–yards	41–154	31–115
Passing yards	277	119
Passing: comp–att–int	23–50–2	10–18–0
Turnovers	2	0
Time of possession	37:34	22:26

Team	Category	Player	Statistics
Columbia	Passing	Chase Goodwin	23/50, 277 yards, 2 TD, 2 INT
Columbia	Rushing	Griffin Johnson	30 carries, 121 yards
Columbia	Receiving	Hutch Crow	6 receptions, 83 yards
Georgetown	Passing	Jack Johnson	10/18, 119 yards, TD
Georgetown	Rushing	Clay Ash	15 carries, 79 yards
Georgetown	Receiving	Isaiah Grimes	3 receptions, 34 yards

=== Princeton ===
Princeton Tigers (1–2) at Columbia Lions (2–0) – Game summary

Quarter	1	2	3	4	Total
Tigers	7	14	0	14	35
Lions	0	7	0	0	7

at Lawrence A. Wien Stadium • New York, New York

- Date: October 3
- Game time: 12:00 p.m. EDT
- Game weather: Sunny • Temperature: 68 °F (20 °C) • Wind: NE at 9 miles per hour (14 km/h)
- Game attendance: 3,676
- Referee: Jay Johnson
- TV announcers (ESPN+): Lance Meadow (play-by-play) and Shawn FitzGerald (analyst)
- Report: Official report

Game information
First quarter
- PRIN – Kai Honda 40-yard run (Esteban Nunez Perez kick), 6:11. Tigers 7–0. Drive: 7 plays, 80 yards, 3:05.

Second quarter

- COLU – Bryce Coleman 14-yard pass from Chase Goodwin (Hugo Merry kick), 12:39. Tied 7–7. Drive: 6 plays, 70 yards, 2:57.
- PRIN – Kai Honda 7-yard run (Esteban Nunez Perez kick), 10:14. Tigers 14–7. Drive: 7 plays, 75 yards, 2:25.
- PRIN – Kai Honda 53-yard run (Esteban Nunez Perez kick), 1:08. Tigers 21–7. Drive: 7 plays, 71 yards, 2:38.

Third quarter

- No scoring plays.

Fourth quarter

- PRIN – Kai Honda 70-yard run (Esteban Nunez Perez kick), 10:10. Tigers 28–7. Drive: 2 plays, 82 yards, 1:06.
- PRIN – Aidan Besselman 55-yard pass from Ty Ciongoli (Esteban Nunez Perez kick), 6:27. Tigers 35–7. Drive: 3 plays, 59 yards, 1:37.

Statistics	PRIN	COLU
First downs	15	28
Plays–yards	47–379	82–422
Rushes–yards	31–245	31–91
Passing yards	134	331
Passing: comp–att–int	7–16–0	35–51–1
Turnovers	0	1
Time of possession	20:21	39:39

Team	Category	Player	Statistics
Princeton	Passing	Ty Ciongoli	3/5, 112 yards, TD
Princeton	Rushing	Kai Honda	14 carries, 219 yards, 4 TD
Princeton	Receiving	Aidan Besselman	2 receptions, 60 yards, TD
Columbia	Passing	Chase Goodwin	35/51, 331 yards, TD, INT
Columbia	Rushing	Griffin Johnson	15 carries, 63 yards
Columbia	Receiving	Bryce Coleman	7 receptions, 89 yards, TD

=== at Marist ===
Columbia Lions (2–1) at Marist Red Foxes (3–2) – Game summary

Quarter	1	2	3	4	Total
Lions	7	14	0	20	41
Red Foxes	0	14	7	7	28

at Tenney Stadium • Poughkeepsie, New York

- Date: October 9
- Game time: 7:00 p.m. EDT
- Game weather: Clear • Temperature: 61 °F (16 °C) • Wind: W at 4 miles per hour (6.4 km/h)
- Game attendance: 1,141
- Referee: Jeremy DeAngulo
- TV announcers (ESPN+): Geoff Brault (play-by-play), Steve Eggink (analyst) and William Rosen (sideline)
- Report: Official report

Game information
First quarter
- COLU – Carter McCray 85-yard blocked field goal return (Hugo Merry kick), 7:50. Lions 7–0.

Second quarter

- MRST – Jayden Taylor 15-yard pass from Sonny Mannino (Luke Stenson kick), 10:23. Tied 7–7. Drive: 6 plays, 58 yards, 3:31.
- MRST – Jeremy Decaro 16-yard run (Luke Stenson kick), 2:42. Red Foxes 14–7. Drive: 6 plays, 58 yards, 4:52.
- COLU – Beckett Robinson 38-yard pass from Chase Goodwin (Hugo Merry kick), 1:02. Tied 14–14. Drive: 7 plays, 89 yards, 1:31.
- COLU – AJ George 44-yard fumble recovery (Hugo Merry kick), 0:33. Lions 21–14.

Third quarter

- MRST – Zach Garmont 55-yard pass from Sonny Mannino (Luke Stenson kick), 12:10. Tied 21–21. Drive: 4 plays, 73 yards, 0:56.

Fourth quarter

- MRST – Sonny Mannino 1-yard run (Luke Stenson kick), 14:18. Red Foxes 28–21. Drive: 9 plays, 66 yards, 4:43.
- COLU – Griffin Johnson 1-yard run, 9:56. Red Foxes 28–27. Drive: 10 plays, 71 yards, 4:16.
- COLU – Hutch Crow 19-yard pass from Chase Goodwin, 8:21. Lions 33–28. Drive: 1 play, 19 yards, 0:07.
- COLU – Safety, 7:32. Lions 35–28.
- COLU – Bryce Coleman 13-yard pass from Chase Goodwin, 2:19. Lions 41–28. Drive: 12 plays, 57 yards, 5:07.

Statistics	COLU	MRST
First downs	22	24
Plays–yards	63–363	70–458
Rushes–yards	31–86	29–121
Passing yards	277	337
Passing: comp–att–int	22–32–1	25–41–0
Turnovers	2	2
Time of possession	27:41	32:19

Team	Category	Player	Statistics
Columbia	Passing	Chase Goodwin	22/32, 277 yards, 3 TD, INT
Columbia	Rushing	Griffin Johnson	19 carries, 98 yards, TD
Columbia	Receiving	Hutch Crow	7 receptions, 105 yards, TD
Marist	Passing	Sonny Mannino	22/34, 321 yards, 2 TD
Marist	Rushing	Isaiah Simmons	17 carries, 76 yards
Marist	Receiving	Reed Shumpert	6 receptions, 105 yards

=== at Penn ===
Columbia Lions (3–1) at Penn Quakers (2–2) – Game summary

Quarter	1	2	3	4	Total
Lions	7	14	0	7	28
Quakers	17	7	3	0	27

at Franklin Field • Philadelphia, Pennsylvania

- Date: October 16
- Game time: 8:30 p.m. EDT
- Game weather: Rain • Temperature: 66 °F (19 °C) • Wind: SE at 21 miles per hour (34 km/h)
- Game attendance: 1,860
- Referee: Justin Ackley
- TV announcers (ESPNU): Eric Forde (play-by-play) and Jack Ford (analyst)
- Report: Official report

Game information
First quarter
- PENN – Tommy Lafayette 6-yard run (Mason Walters kick), 10:08. Quakers 7–0. Drive: 7 plays, 48 yards, 4:03.
- PENN – Mason Walters 52-yard field goal, 6:01. Quakers 10–0. Drive: 7 plays, 16 yards, 3:08.
- COLU – Bryce Coleman 16-yard pass from Chase Goodwin (Hugo Merry kick), 3:27. Quakers 10–7. Drive: 7 plays, 70 yards, 2:34.
- PENN – Mason Page 19-yard pass from Karson Siqueiros-Lasky (Mason Walters kick), 3:06. Quakers 17–7. Drive: 1 play, 19 yards, 0:08.

Second quarter

- PENN – Dante Barone 20-yard pass from Karson Siqueiros-Lasky (Mason Walters kick), 14:19. Quakers 24–7. Drive: 2 plays, 63 yards, 0:31.
- COLU – Griffin Johnson 3-yard run (Hugo Merry kick), 4:00. Quakers 24–14. Drive: 10 plays, 58 yards, 4:07.
- COLU – Bryce Coleman 11-yard pass from Chase Goodwin (Hugo Merry kick), 1:28. Quakers 24–21. Drive: 6 plays, 48 yards, 0:58.

Third quarter

- PENN – Mason Walters 28-yard field goal, 9:19. Quakers 27–21. Drive: 10 plays, 64 yards, 5:41.

Fourth quarter

- COLU – Bryce Coleman 9-yard pass from Chase Goodwin (Hugo Merry kick), 6:41. Lions 28–27. Drive: 9 plays, 69 yards, 4:08.

Statistics	COLU	PENN
First downs	24	20
Plays–yards	78–362	70–446
Rushes–yards	38–125	29–72
Passing yards	237	374
Passing: comp–att–int	17–40–2	23–41–4
Turnovers	2	4
Time of possession	28:49	31:11

Team	Category	Player	Statistics
Columbia	Passing	Chase Goodwin	17/40, 237 yards, 3 TD, 2 INT
Columbia	Rushing	Griffin Johnson	21 carries, 80 yards, TD
Columbia	Receiving	Bryce Coleman	6 receptions, 90 yards, 3 TD
Penn	Passing	Karson Siqueiros-Lasky	23/41, 374 yards, 2 TD, 4 INT
Penn	Rushing	Tommy Lafayette	11 carries, 36 yards, TD
Penn	Receiving	Isaac Lee	10 receptions, 158 yards

=== Dartmouth ===
Dartmouth Big Green (2–3) at Columbia Lions (4–1) – Game summary

Quarter	1	2	3	4	Total
Big Green	7	14	7	10	38
Lions	3	7	0	8	18

at Lawrence A. Wien Stadium • New York, New York

- Date: October 24
- Game time: 1:30 p.m.
- Game weather: Sunny • Temperature: 60 °F (16 °C) • Wind: W at 5 miles per hour (8.0 km/h)
- Game attendance: 12,932
- Referee: Anthony Florio
- TV announcers (ESPN+): Lance Medow (play-by-play) and Shawn FitzGerald (analyst)
- Report: Official report

Game information
First quarter
- DART – Myles Craddock 14-yard run (Owen Zalc kick), 9:50. Big Green 7–0. Drive: 11 plays, 75 yards, 4:58.
- COLU – Hugo Merry 22-yard field goal, 1:31. Big Green 7–3. Drive: 10 plays, 53 yards, 3:54.

Second quarter

- DART – Jacob Henry 3-yard run (Owen Zalc kick), 10:21. Big Green 14–3. Drive: 6 plays, 61 yards, 2:42.
- COLU – Hutch Crow 30-yard pass from Chase Goodwin (Hugo Merry kick), 6:40. Big Green 14–10. Drive: 10 plays, 75 yards, 3:41.
- DART – Grayson Saunier 1-yard run (Owen Zalc kick), 0:55. Big Green 21–10. Drive: 10 plays, 80 yards, 3:14.

Third quarter

- DART – Grayson Saunier 1-yard run (Owen Zalc kick), 2:52. Big Green 28–10. Drive: 15 plays, 83 yards, 9:35.

Fourth quarter

- COLU – Bryce Coleman 14-yard pass from Chase Goodwin (Braden Dougherty pass), 14:50. Big Green 28–18. Drive: 8 plays, 75 yards, 3:02.
- DART – Owen Zalc 41-yard field goal, 10:08. Big Green 31–18. Drive: 7 plays, -3 yards, 3:40.
- DART – Grayson Saunier 68-yard run (Owen Zalc kick), 1:42. Big Green 38–18. Drive: 5 plays, 80 yards, 1:14.

Statistics	DART	COLU
First downs	19	20
Plays–yards	70–419	73–355
Rushes–yards	46–247	33–146
Passing yards	172	209
Passing: comp–att–int	14–24–0	20–40–3
Turnovers	0	3
Time of possession	32:28	27:32

Team	Category	Player	Statistics
Dartmouth	Passing	Grayson Saunier	14/24, 172 yards
Dartmouth	Rushing	Myles Craddock	23 carries, 128 yards, TD
Dartmouth	Receiving	James Elliott	3 receptions, 61 yards
Columbia	Passing	Chase Goodwin	20/40, 209 yards, 2 TD, 3 INT
Columbia	Rushing	Griffin Johnson	15 carries, 73 yards
Columbia	Receiving	Hutch Crow	7 receptions, 94 yards, TD

=== Yale ===
Yale Bulldogs (3–3) at Columbia Lions (4–2) – Game summary

Quarter	1	2	3	4	Total
Bulldogs	0	16	7	3	26
Lions	0	0	8	0	8

at Lawrence A. Wien Stadium • New York, New York

- Date: October 31
- Game time: 12:00 p.m. EDT
- Game weather: Sunny • Temperature: 56 °F (13 °C) • Wind: NW at 8 miles per hour (13 km/h)
- Game attendance: 3,024
- Referee: Tom Zetts
- TV announcers (ESPN+): Lance Medow (play-by-play) and Shawn FitzGerald (analyst)
- Report: Official report

Game information
First quarter
- No scoring plays.

Second quarter

- YALE – Graham Smith 23-yard pass from Dante Reno (Noah Piper kick), 13:41. Bulldogs 7–0. Drive: 9 plays, 67 yards, 4:04.
- YALE – Phoenix Grant 0-yard safety, 13:31. Bulldogs 9–0.
- YALE – Lucius Anderson 34-yard pass from Dante Reno (Noah Piper kick), 10:34. Bulldogs 16–0. Drive: 6 plays, 68 yards, 2:51.

Third quarter

- YALE – Hugo Djeumeni Kemeni 63-yard run (Noah Piper kick), 13:23. Bulldogs 23–0. Drive: 4 plays, 85 yards, 1:30.
- COLU – Bryce Coleman 11-yard pass from Chase Goodwin (Bryce Coleman pass), 1:33. Bulldogs 23–8. Drive: 11 plays, 70 yards, 5:15.

Fourth quarter

- YALE – Noah Piper 46-yard field goal, 4:08. Bulldogs 26–8. Drive: 4 plays, 7 yards, 1:06.

Statistics	YALE	COLU
First downs	16	23
Plays–yards	72–356	69–241
Rushes–yards	41–222	21–34
Passing yards	134	207
Passing: comp–att–int	14–31–0	24–48–1
Turnovers	0	1
Time of possession	33:41	26:27

Team	Category	Player	Statistics
Yale	Passing	Dante Reno	14/31, 134 yards, 2 TD
Yale	Rushing	Hugo Djeumeni Kemeni	23 carries, 155 yards, TD
Yale	Receiving	Lucius Anderson	5 receptions, 56 yards, TD
Columbia	Passing	Chase Goodwin	24/48, 207 yards, TD, INT
Columbia	Rushing	Griffin Johnson	8 carries, 16 yards
Columbia	Receiving	Bryce Coleman	10 receptions, 108 yards, TD

=== at No. 19т Harvard ===
Columbia Lions (4–3) at No. 19т Harvard Crimson (6–1) – Game summary

Quarter	1	2	3	4	Total
Lions	0	0	0	0	0
No. 19т Crimson	16	21	0	0	37

at Harvard Stadium • Boston, Massachusetts

- Date: November 7
- Game time: 1:00 p.m. EDT
- Game weather: Sunny
- Referee: Cory Hanson
- TV announcers (ESPN+): Alex Vispoli (play-by-play), Tim Murphy (analyst) and Gabby Sartori (sideline)
- Report: Official report

Game information
First quarter
- HARV – Ryan Tattersall 43-yard pass from Charlie Smith (Kieran Corr kick), 7:02. Crimson 7–0. Drive: 7 plays, 95 yards, 2:31.
- HARV – 0-yard safety, 5:52. Crimson 9–0.
- HARV – Kise Flannery 1-yard run (Kieran Corr kick), 0:06. Crimson 16–0. Drive: 12 plays, 67 yards, 5:41.

Second quarter

- HARV – DJ Gordon 35-yard run (Kieran Corr kick), 12:52. Crimson 23–0. Drive: 5 plays, 45 yards, 2:01.
- HARV – Logan Reaska 8-yard pass from Charlie Smith (Kieran Corr kick), 4:05. Crimson 30–0. Drive: 9 plays, 93 yards, 5:31.
- HARV – DJ Gordon 7-yard run (Kieran Corr kick), 1:31. Crimson 37–0. Drive: 3 plays, 55 yards, 0:20.

Third quarter

- No scoring plays

Fourth quarter

- No scoring plays

Statistics	COLU	HARV
First downs	17	21
Plays–yards	71–261	61–434
Rushes–yards	47–206	37–222
Passing yards	55	212
Passing: comp–att–int	9–24–1	14–24–1
Turnovers	2	1
Time of possession	30:31	29:29

Team	Category	Player	Statistics
Columbia	Passing	Chase Goodwin	9/23, 55 yards, INT
Columbia	Rushing	Brody McLaughlin	15 carries, 62 yards
Columbia	Receiving	Hutch Crow	2 receptions, 18 yards
Harvard	Passing	Charlie Smith	12/20, 184 yards, 2 TD, INT
Harvard	Rushing	DJ Gordon	14 carries, 150 yards, 2 TD
Harvard	Receiving	Nathan Bailey	5 receptions, 70 yards

=== at Brown ===
Columbia Lions (4–4) at Brown Bears (5–3) – Game summary

Quarter	1	2	3	4	Total
Lions	0	21	0	7	28
Bears	7	3	7	3	20

at Brown Stadium • Providence, Rhode Island

- Date: November 14
- Game time: 12:00 p.m. EST
- Game attendance: 3,008
- TV announcers (ESPN+): Scott Cordischi (play-by-play), John Anderson (analyst) and Nick Coit (sideline)
- Report: Official report

Statistics	COLU	BRWN
First downs		
Plays–yards		
Rushes–yards		
Passing yards		
Passing: comp–att–int		
Turnovers		
Time of possession		

Team	Category	Player	Statistics
Columbia	Passing		
Columbia	Rushing		
Columbia	Receiving		
Brown	Passing		
Brown	Rushing		
Brown	Receiving		

=== Cornell (rivalry) ===
Cornell Big Red (4–5) at Columbia Lions (4–5) – Game summary

Quarter	1	2	3	4	Total
Big Red	0	0	0	0	0
Lions	0	0	0	0	0

at Lawrence A. Wien Stadium • New York, New York

- Date: November 21
- Game time: 12:00 p.m. EST
- TV: ESPN+

Statistics	COR	COLU
First downs		
Plays–yards		
Rushes–yards		
Passing yards		
Passing: comp–att–int		
Turnovers		
Time of possession		

Team	Category	Player	Statistics
Cornell	Passing		
Cornell	Rushing		
Cornell	Receiving		
Columbia	Passing		
Columbia	Rushing		
Columbia	Receiving		

== Personnel ==
=== Roster ===
2026 Columbia Lions football team roster
Players
Coaches
Offense

Pos.	#	Name	Class
WR	0	Hutch Crow	Jr
QB	2	Xander Eschelman	So
WR	3	Caden Butler	So
WR	4	Bryce Coleman	Fr
WR	5	CJ Willingham	Fr
WR	7	Elliot Cooper	So
QB	8	Caleb Sanchez	Jr
WR	9	Gavin Barth	Fr
WR	11	Braylon Gardoni	Sr
WR	13	Beckett Robinson	So
WR	14	Jaylen Carter	Sr
QB	15	Chase Goodwin	Sr
QB	16	Kaedyn Marable	Fr
WR	17	Christian Carti	Sr
QB	18	Xander Menapace	Sr
RB	19	Brody McLaughlin	Fr
RB	22	Jahmir Pitcher	So
RB	24	Michael Walters	So
WR	25	Pierson Scala	Fr
WR	27	Jarod Sersansie	Fr
RB	32	Griffin Johnson	Sr
RB	37	George Thanopoulos	Sr
RB	38	Brandon Hsing	Sr
TE	40	Tucker Rhodes	Fr
TE	42	Blaize Cameron	Jr
TE	44	Quinn Gallagher	Fr
TE	45	Malachi Mercer	Sr
OL	51	Sean Kimani	Sr
OL	55	Henry Estes	So
OL	57	Emanuel Nazy	Jr
OL	58	Benny Sasso	Jr
OL	60	Frazer Befekadu	Fr
OL	61	Jace Eveland	So
OL	62	Dylan Clifton	So
OL	63	Rocco Costello	Fr
OL	70	Ahmari Owens	Sr
OL	71	Charlie Slavik	Jr
OL	72	Stone Theis	So
OL	73	Austin Hooey	Fr
OL	74	Dawson Thompson	So
OL	75	Nik Winzer	Sr
OL	76	Simon Vander Wel	So
OL	77	Griff Koch	Fr
OL	79	Cooper Richmond	Fr
WR	80	Colin Cook	Sr
WR	82	Ezra Malamura	So
WR	83	Jevaughn Barnett-Jackson	So
TE	84	Santiago Hernandez	Sr
WR	85	Titus Evans	Sr
TE	86	Braden Dougherty	Sr
WR	87	Weston Covey	Jr
TE	88	Casey O'Sullivan	Jr
TE	89	Braden James	So

Defense

Pos.	#	Name	Class
DL	0	Keller Patterson	Jr
DB	1	Jeremiah Douglas	Jr
DB	2	Terell Battle	Sr
DB	3	Carter McCray	Jr
DB	4	Will Rubalcava	Sr
LB	4	Nico DePizzol	Fr
DB	6	Mason Robinson	Jr
DB	7	Caleb Solomon (C)	Jr
DB	8	Ethan Fullerton	Sr
DL	9	Austin Coronado	So
DB	10	Austin Baird	Fr
LB	11	Charlie Newton (C)	Sr
DB	12	MD Awe	So
DL	14	Bryan Iwuoha	Fr
DB	15	Tylan Ward Jr.	Fr
DB	17	Miron Magee	Jr
LB	18	AJ George	Sr
LB	19	Drew Burmeister	So
DB	20	Jayden Jackson	So
DB	21	Qwincy Amos	Sr
DB	23	Galvin Goss	So
LB	24	Michael Sclafani	Fr
DB	26	Adande Nartey	So
DB	29	Levi Robins	Sr
DB	30	Ellis Barnes	Fr
LB	31	Christian Gonzalez	Jr
LB	32	Lukas Lupinski	Fr
LB	33	Liam Donagher	Jr
DB	34	Mayan Muchugia	Fr
LB	35	James Fealy	Jr
DB	41	Jackson Powell	Fr
LB	43	Owen Rice	Fr
LB	44	Caleb Chijoke Ihegihu	Jr
LB	47	Brendan Fournier	So
DL	48	Bailey Kornegay-Douhadji	Sr
DL	49	Keelan Kornegay-Douhadji	Sr
DL	52	Jalen Campbell	Sr
DL	54	Quinn Herlihy	Sr
DL	55	Will Matthew	Jr
DL	82	Jonah Walker	So
DL	90	Myles Jackson	Fr
DL	91	Julius Patton	So
DL	92	Richard Bell Jr.	Jr
DL	93	Luke Walker	Jr
DL	94	Archy Wang	Fr
DL	95	Cole Matejka	So
DL	96	Luke Baran	Fr
DL	97	Owen Thomas	Sr
DL	98	Tim Fuhrmeister	Fr
DL	99	Will Carstens	Jr

Special teams

Pos.	#	Name	Class
K	1	Hugo Merry	Sr
P	28	Tommy Sleeman	Jr
K	35	Sam Pearman	Jr
LS	42	Thomas Browne	So

Head coach

- Jon Poppe

Coordinators/assistant coaches

- Ryan Osborn – Defensive coordinator / assistant head coach
- Seitu Smith – Offensive coordinator
- Chris Batti – Quarterbacks coach
- AJ Gallagher – Wide receivers coach
- Andrew Kukesh – Defensive backs coach / co–defensive coordinator
- Gregory Skjold – Offensive line coach
- Carlif Taylor – Defensive line coach
- Kenneth Tinsley – Running backs coach
- Justin Woodley – Linebackers coach
- Marshall Markham – Offensive quality control assistant
- Quinn Rothman – Special teams quality control assistant
- Owen Straley – Defensive quality control assistant

Legend

- (C) Team captain
- (S) Suspended
- (I) Ineligible
- Injured
- Redshirt

Roster
Last update: 2026-10-24
