= 2026 Princeton Tigers football team =

American college football season

2026 Princeton Tigers football
- Conference: Ivy League
- Record: 6–4 (4–3 Ivy)
- Head coach: Bob Surace (16th season)
- Offensive coordinator: Mike Rosenbaum (3rd season)
- Offensive scheme: Spread option
- Defensive coordinator: Mike Weick (1st season)
- Base defense: 4–2–5
- Home stadium: Powers Field at Princeton Stadium

2026 Ivy League football standings
	Conf.			Overall
Team	W		L	W		L
No. 17 Harvard +^	5	–	1	8	–	1
Princeton	4	–	2	6	–	3
Brown	4	–	2	6	–	3
Yale	3	–	3	5	–	4
Dartmouth	3	–	3	4	–	5
Penn	2	–	4	4	–	5
Cornell	2	–	4	4	–	5
Columbia	1	–	5	4	–	5
+ – Conference co-champions; ^ – FCS playoff participant; As of November 22, 2026; Rankings from STATS Poll

The 2026 Princeton Tigers football team represents Princeton University as a member of the Ivy League during the 2026 NCAA Division I FCS football season. The team is led by 16th-year head coach Bob Surace and plays its home games at Powers Field at Princeton Stadium.

== Preseason ==
=== Preseason poll ===
On August 3, the Ivy League released its preseason prediction poll. The Tigers were predicted to finish 5th in the conference.

== Schedule ==
Date	Time	Opponent	Rank	Site	TV	Result	Attendance
September 19	1:00 p.m.	at Bryant*		Beirne Stadium; Smithfield, RI	FloSports	L 14–21	3,411
September 26	3:00 p.m.	Albany*		Powers Field at Princeton Stadium; Princeton, NJ	ESPN+	W 22–0	3,902
October 3	12:00 p.m.	at Columbia		Robert K. Kraft Field at Lawrence A. Wien Stadium; New York, NY	ESPN+	W 35–7	3,676
October 10	12:00 p.m.	at Wagner*		Wagner College Stadium; New York, NY	NEC Front Row	W 28–13	1,223
October 17	12:00 p.m.	Brown		Powers Field at Princeton Stadium; Princeton, NJ	ESPN+	W 16–10	3,944
October 24	3:00 p.m.	at No. 15 Harvard		Harvard Stadium; Boston, MA (rivalry)	ESPN+	L 7–35	14,896
October 31	12:00 p.m.	Cornell		Powers Field at Princeton Stadium; Princeton, NJ	ESPN+	W 21–20	5,097
November 7	12:00 p.m.	Dartmouth		Powers Field at Princeton Stadium; Princeton, NJ	ESPN+	W 21–14	4,549
November 14	12:00 p.m.	at Yale	No. 25	Yale Bowl; New Haven, CT (rivalry)	ESPN+	L 0–28	6,440
November 21	12:00 p.m.	Penn		Powers Field at Princeton Stadium; Princeton, NJ (rivalry)	ESPN+	L 12–19	4,297
*Non-conference game; Rankings from STATS Poll released prior to the game; All times are in Eastern time

== Game summaries ==
=== at Bryant ===
Princeton Tigers (0–0) at Bryant Bulldogs (2–1) – Game summary

Quarter	1	2	3	4	Total
Tigers	0	0	0	0	0
Bulldogs	0	0	0	0	0

at Beirne Stadium • Smithfield, Rhode Island

- Date: September 19
- Game time: 1:00 p.m.
- TV: FloSports

Game information

First quarter
Second quarter
Third quarter
Fourth quarter

Statistics	PRIN	BRY
First downs		
Plays–yards		
Rushes–yards		
Passing yards		
Passing: comp–att–int		
Turnovers		
Time of possession		

Team	Category	Player	Statistics
Princeton	Passing		
Princeton	Rushing		
Princeton	Receiving		
Bryant	Passing		
Bryant	Rushing		
Bryant	Receiving		

=== Albany ===
Albany Great Danes (2–2) at Princeton Tigers (0–1) – Game summary

Quarter	1	2	3	4	Total
Great Danes	0	0	0	0	0
Tigers	0	0	0	0	0

at Princeton Stadium • Princeton, New Jersey

- Date: September 26
- Game time: 3:00 p.m.
- TV: ESPN+

Game information

First quarter
Second quarter
Third quarter
Fourth quarter

Statistics	ALB	PRIN
First downs		
Plays–yards		
Rushes–yards		
Passing yards		
Passing: comp–att–int		
Turnovers		
Time of possession		

Team	Category	Player	Statistics
Albany	Passing		
Albany	Rushing		
Albany	Receiving		
Princeton	Passing		
Princeton	Rushing		
Princeton	Receiving		

=== at Columbia ===
Princeton Tigers (1–2) at Columbia Lions (2–0) – Game summary

Quarter	1	2	3	4	Total
Tigers	7	14	0	14	35
Lions	0	7	0	0	7

at Robert K. Kraft Field at Lawrence A. Wien Stadium • New York City, New York

- Date: October 3
- Game time: 12:00 p.m.
- Game weather: Sunny • Temperature: 68 °F (20 °C) • Wind: NE at 9 miles per hour (14 km/h)
- Game attendance: 3,676
- Referee: Jay Johnson
- TV announcers (ESPN+): Lance Meadow (play-by-play) and Shawn FitzGerald (analyst)

Game information

First quarter

- PRIN – Kai Honda 40-yard run (Esteban Nunez Perez kick), 6:11. Tigers 7–0. Drive: 7 plays, 80 yards, 3:05.

Second quarter

- COLU – Bryce Coleman 14-yard pass from Chase Goodwin (Hugo Merry kick), 12:39. Tied 7–7. Drive: 6 plays, 70 yards, 2:57.
- PRIN – Kai Honda 7-yard run (Esteban Nunez Perez kick), 10:14. Tigers 14–7. Drive: 7 plays, 75 yards, 2:25.
- PRIN – Kai Honda 53-yard run (Esteban Nunez Perez kick), 1:08. Tigers 21–7. Drive: 7 plays, 71 yards, 2:38.

Third quarter

No scoring plays

Fourth quarter

- PRIN – Kai Honda 70-yard run (Esteban Nunez Perez kick), 10:10. Tigers 28–7. Drive: 2 plays, 82 yards, 1:06.
- PRIN – Aidan Besselman 55-yard pass from Ty Ciongoli (Esteban Nunez Perez kick), 6:27. Tigers 35–7. Drive: 3 plays, 59 yards, 1:37.

Statistics	PRIN	COLU
First downs	15	28
Plays–yards	47–379	82–422
Rushes–yards	31–245	31–91
Passing yards	134	331
Passing: comp–att–int	7–16–0	35–51–1
Turnovers	0	1
Time of possession	20:21	39:39

Team	Category	Player	Statistics
Princeton	Passing	Ty Ciongoli	3/5, 112 yards, TD
Princeton	Rushing	Kai Honda	14 carries, 219 yards, 4 TD
Princeton	Receiving	Aidan Besselman	2 receptions, 60 yards, TD
Columbia	Passing	Chase Goodwin	35/51, 331 yards, TD, INT
Columbia	Rushing	Griffin Johnson	15 carries, 63 yards
Columbia	Receiving	Bryce Coleman	7 receptions, 89 yards, TD

=== at Wagner ===
Princeton Tigers (2–1) at Wagner Seahawks (1–4) – Game summary

Quarter	1	2	3	4	Total
Tigers	0	0	0	0	0
Seahawks	0	0	0	0	0

at Wagner College Stadium • Staten Island, New York

- Date: October 10
- Game time: 12:00 p.m.
- TV: NEC Front Row

Game information

First quarter
Second quarter
Third quarter
Fourth quarter

Statistics	PRIN	WAG
First downs		
Plays–yards		
Rushes–yards		
Passing yards		
Passing: comp–att–int		
Turnovers		
Time of possession		

Team	Category	Player	Statistics
Princeton	Passing		
Princeton	Rushing		
Princeton	Receiving		
Wagner	Passing		
Wagner	Rushing		
Wagner	Receiving		

=== Brown ===
Brown Bears (2–2) at Princeton Tigers (3–1) – Game summary

Quarter	1	2	3	4	Total
Bears	0	0	3	7	10
Tigers	10	6	0	0	16

at Princeton Stadium • Princeton, New Jersey

- Date: October 17
- Game time: 12:00 p.m.
- Game weather: Cloudy • Temperature: 49 °F (9 °C) • Wind: S at 14 miles per hour (23 km/h)
- Game attendance: 3,944
- Referee: Henry Wimberg
- TV: ESPN+

Game information

First quarter

- PRIN – Paul Kuhner 29-yard pass from Wyatt Becker (Esteban Nunez Perez kick), 13:20. Tigers 7–0. Drive: 4 plays, 75 yards, 1:36.
- PRIN – Esteban Nunez Perez 34-yard field goal, 7:24. Tigers 10–0. Drive: 12 plays, 50 yards, 4:55.

Second quarter

- PRIN – Esteban Nunez Perez 25-yard field goal, 10:15. Tigers 13–0. Drive: 11 plays, 59 yards, 4:01.
- PRIN – Esteban Nunez Perez 38-yard field goal, 1:55. Tigers 16–0. Drive: 13 plays, 36 yards, 5:09.

Third quarter

- BRWN – Drew Crabtree 21-yard field goal, 2:53. Tigers 16–3. Drive: 19 plays, 88 yards, 7:06.

Fourth quarter

- BRWN – Levi Linowes 2-yard pass from Matt Childs (Drew Crabtree kick), 1:05. Tigers 16–10. Drive: 12 plays, 92 yards, 3:08.

Statistics	BRWN	PRIN
First downs	24	20
Plays–yards	84–350	72–372
Rushes–yards	27–44	38–117
Passing yards	306	255
Passing: comp–att–int	34–57–0	20–34–1
Turnovers	2	1
Time of possession	29:20	30:40

Team	Category	Player	Statistics
Brown	Passing	James Murphy	33/56, 304 yards
Brown	Rushing	Matt Childs	12 carries, 29 yards
Brown	Receiving	Matt Childs	8 receptions, 82 yards
Princeton	Passing	Wyatt Becker	8/15, 128 yards, TD
Princeton	Rushing	Kai Honda	28 carries, 84 yards
Princeton	Receiving	Jackson Green	4 receptions, 79 yards

=== at No. 15 Harvard (rivalry) ===
Princeton Tigers (4–1) at No. 15 Harvard Crimson (5–0) – Game summary

Quarter	1	2	3	4	Total
Tigers	0	0	7	0	7
No. 15 Crimson	3	10	8	14	35

at Harvard Stadium • Boston, Massachusetts

- Date: October 24
- Game time: 3:00 p.m.
- Game weather: Sunny • Temperature: 59 °F (15 °C)
- Game attendance: 14,896
- Referee: Tom Zetts
- TV: ESPN+

Game information

First quarter

- HARV – Kieran Corr 24-yard field goal, 2:51. Crimson 3–0. Drive: 18 plays, 74 yards, 10:02.

Second quarter

- HARV – Henry Shoemaker 26-yard pass from Charlie Smith (Kieran Corr kick), 10:48. Crimson 10–0. Drive: 3 plays, 69 yards, 1:22.
- HARV – Kieran Corr 32-yard field goal, 2:09. Crimson 13–0. Drive: 14 plays, 61 yards, 6:12.

Third quarter

- HARV – Teigan Pelletier 18-yard pass from Kise Flannery (Kise Flannery–Nathan Bailey pass), 10:25. Crimson 21–0. Drive: 9 plays, 75 yards, 4:30.
- PRIN – Aidan Besselman 8-yard pass from Wyatt Becker (Esteban Nunez Perez kick), 1:02. Crimson 21–7. Drive: 20 plays, 75 yards, 9:23.

Fourth quarter

- HARV – Tafari Moe 18-yard pass from Charlie Smith (Kieran Corr kick), 12:50. Crimson 28–7. Drive: 7 plays, 75 yards, 3:12.
- HARV – Dorsey Benefield 32-yard fumble recovery (Kieran Corr kick), 10:49. Crimson 35–7.

Statistics	PRIN	HARV
First downs	19	24
Plays–yards	63–219	62–391
Rushes–yards	35–92	31–128
Passing yards	127	263
Passing: comp–att–int	20–28–1	25–31–0
Turnovers	2	0
Time of possession	27:05	32:55

Team	Category	Player	Statistics
Princeton	Passing	Ty Ciongoli	9/14, 73 yards, INT
Princeton	Rushing	Kai Honda	18 carries, 60 yards
Princeton	Receiving	Josh Smith	3 receptions, 37 yards
Harvard	Passing	Charlie Smith	22/28, 230 yards, 2 TD
Harvard	Rushing	DJ Gordon	9 carries, 67 yards
Harvard	Receiving	Tafari Moe	3 receptions, 53 yards, TD

=== Cornell ===
Cornell Big Red (3–3) at Princeton Tigers (4–2) – Game summary

Quarter	1	2	3	4	Total
Big Red	0	0	0	0	0
Tigers	0	0	0	0	0

at Princeton Stadium • Princeton, New Jersey

- Date: October 31
- Game time: 12:00 p.m.
- TV: ESPN+

Game information

First quarter
Second quarter
Third quarter
Fourth quarter

Statistics	COR	PRIN
First downs		
Plays–yards		
Rushes–yards		
Passing yards		
Passing: comp–att–int		
Turnovers		
Time of possession		

Team	Category	Player	Statistics
Cornell	Passing		
Cornell	Rushing		
Cornell	Receiving		
Princeton	Passing		
Princeton	Rushing		
Princeton	Receiving		

=== Dartmouth ===
Dartmouth Big Green (4–3) at Princeton Tigers (5–2) – Game summary

Quarter	1	2	3	4	Total
Big Green	0	0	0	0	0
Tigers	0	0	0	0	0

at Princeton Stadium • Princeton, New Jersey

- Date: November 7
- Game time: 12:00 p.m.
- TV: ESPN+

Game information

First quarter
Second quarter
Third quarter
Fourth quarter

Statistics	DART	PRIN
First downs		
Plays–yards		
Rushes–yards		
Passing yards		
Passing: comp–att–int		
Turnovers		
Time of possession		

Team	Category	Player	Statistics
Dartmouth	Passing		
Dartmouth	Rushing		
Dartmouth	Receiving		
Princeton	Passing		
Princeton	Rushing		
Princeton	Receiving		

=== at Yale (rivalry) ===
No. 25 Princeton Tigers (6–2) at Yale Bulldogs (4–4) – Game summary

Quarter	1	2	3	4	Total
No. 25 Tigers	0	0	0	0	0
Bulldogs	0	0	0	0	0

at Yale Bowl • New Haven, Connecticut

- Date: November 14
- Game time: 12:00 p.m.
- TV: ESPN+

Game information

First quarter
Second quarter
Third quarter
Fourth quarter

Statistics	PRIN	YALE
First downs		
Plays–yards		
Rushes–yards		
Passing yards		
Passing: comp–att–int		
Turnovers		
Time of possession		

Team	Category	Player	Statistics
Princeton	Passing		
Princeton	Rushing		
Princeton	Receiving		
Yale	Passing		
Yale	Rushing		
Yale	Receiving		

=== Penn (rivalry) ===
Penn Quakers (4–5) at Princeton Tigers (6–3) – Game summary

Quarter	1	2	3	4	Total
Quakers	0	0	0	0	0
Tigers	0	0	0	0	0

at Princeton Stadium • Princeton, New Jersey

- Date: November 21
- Game time: 12:00 p.m.
- TV: ESPN+

Game information

First quarter
Second quarter
Third quarter
Fourth quarter

Statistics	PENN	PRIN
First downs		
Plays–yards		
Rushes–yards		
Passing yards		
Passing: comp–att–int		
Turnovers		
Time of possession		

Team	Category	Player	Statistics
Penn	Passing		
Penn	Rushing		
Penn	Receiving		
Princeton	Passing		
Princeton	Rushing		
Princeton	Receiving		
