= Jon Poppe =

American football coach (born 1984)

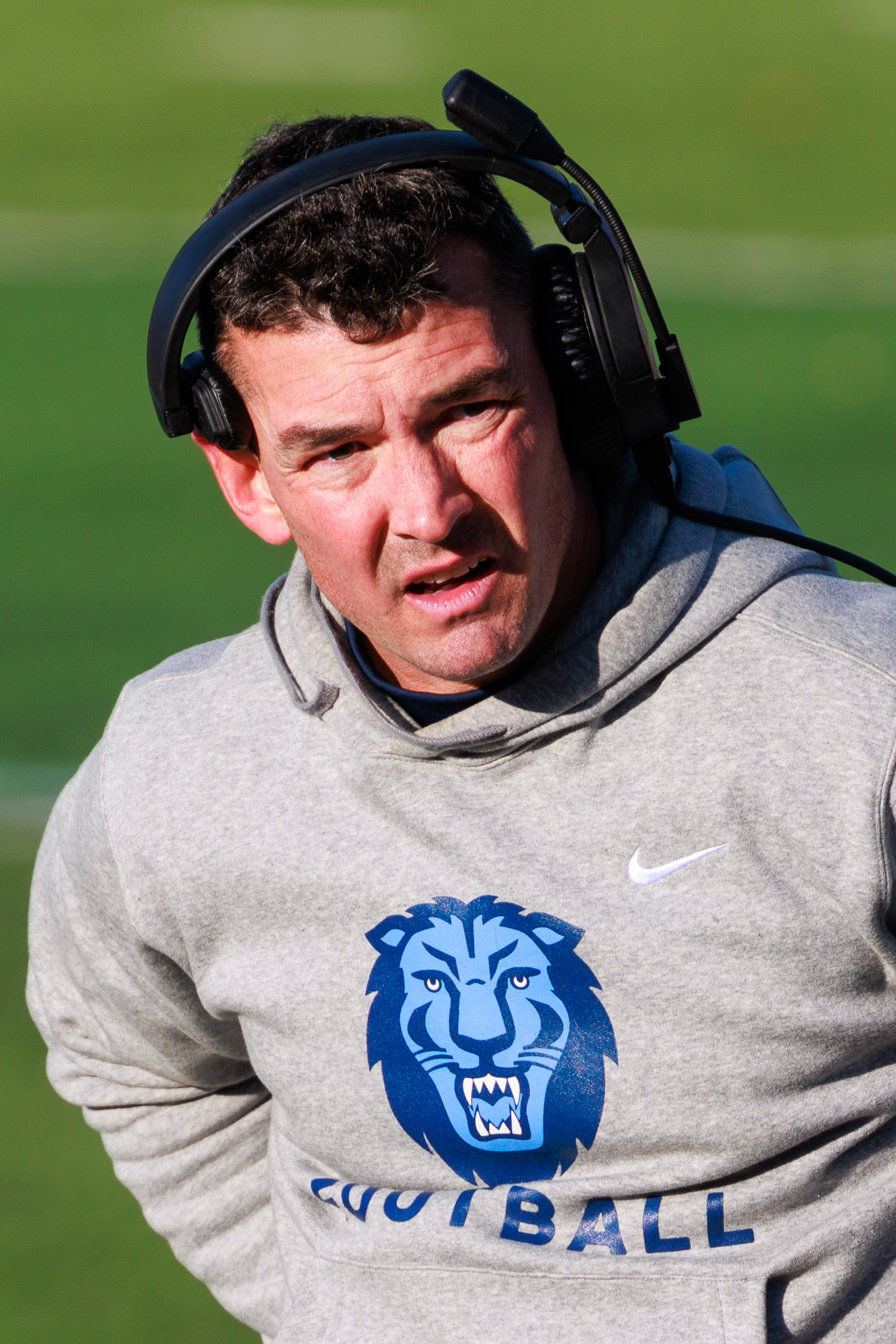
- Poppe in 2024

Current position
- Title: Head coach
- Team: Columbia
- Conference: Ivy League
- Record: 13–14

Biographical details
- Born: December 22, 1984 (age 41); Upper Saddle River, New Jersey, U.S.

Playing career
- 2003–2006: Williams
- Position: Defensive back

Coaching career (HC unless noted)
- 2007: King's (PA) (intern)
- 2008–2009: Springfield (GA)
- 2010: Holy Cross (assistant DB)
- 2011–2014: Harvard (assistant DB)
- 2015–2017: Columbia (DB)
- 2018–2022: Harvard (ST/DB)
- 2023: Union (NY)
- 2024–present: Columbia

Head coaching record
- Overall: 23–16
- Tournaments: 1–1 (NCAA D-III playoffs)

Accomplishments and honors

Championships
- Ivy League (2024)

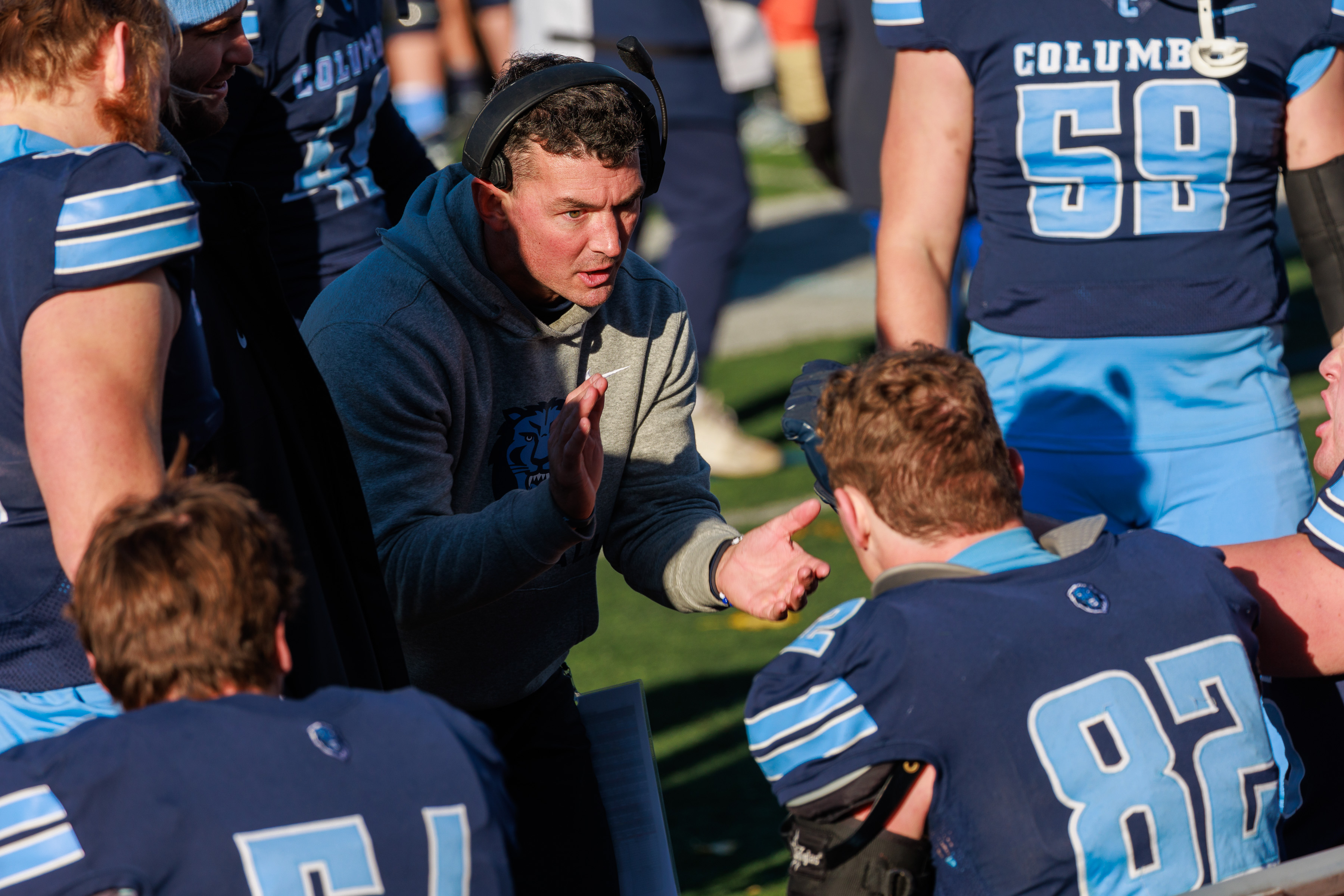
Poppe speaks with Columbia players in 2024.

Jonathan Poppe (born December 22, 1984) is an American college football coach. He is the head football coach for Columbia University, a position he has held since 2024. He was the head football coach for Union College in 2023. He also coached for King's, Springfield, Holy Cross, Harvard, and Columbia. He played college football for Williams as a defensive back.

== Head coaching record ==
Year	Team	Overall	Conference	Standing	Bowl/playoffs	D3^{#}	AFCA^{°}
Union Garnet Chargers (Liberty League) (2023)
2023	Union	10–2	5–1	2nd	L NCAA Division III Second Round	21	20
Union:		10–2	5–1				
Columbia Lions (Ivy League) (2024–present)
2024	Columbia	7–3	5–2	T–1st			
2025	Columbia	2–8	1–6	8th			
2026	Columbia	4–3	1–3				
Columbia:		13–14	7–11				
Total:		23–16					
