= 2026 Dartmouth Big Green football team =

American college football season

2026 Dartmouth Big Green football
- Conference: Ivy League
- Record: 5–5 (4–3 Ivy)
- Head coach: Sammy McCorkle (4th season)
- Offensive coordinator: Shane Montgomery (2nd season)
- Offensive scheme: Pro spread
- Defensive coordinator: Jordan Belfiori (1st season)
- Base defense: Multiple 4–2–5
- Home stadium: Memorial Field

2026 Ivy League football standings
	Conf.			Overall
Team	W		L	W		L
No. 17 Harvard +^	5	–	1	8	–	1
Princeton	4	–	2	6	–	3
Brown	4	–	2	6	–	3
Yale	3	–	3	5	–	4
Dartmouth	3	–	3	4	–	5
Penn	2	–	4	4	–	5
Cornell	2	–	4	4	–	5
Columbia	1	–	5	4	–	5
+ – Conference co-champions; ^ – FCS playoff participant; As of November 22, 2026; Rankings from STATS Poll

The 2026 Dartmouth Big Green football team will represent Dartmouth College as a member of the Ivy League during the 2026 NCAA Division I FCS football season. The Big Green will be led by fourth-year head coach Sammy McCorkle and play home games at Memorial Field.

== Schedule ==
Date	Time	Opponent	Site	TV	Result	Attendance
September 19	12:00 p.m.	at No. 7 Lehigh*	Goodman Stadium; Bethlehem, PA	ESPN+	L 20–24	8,902
September 26	1:00 p.m.	Monmouth*	Memorial Field; Hanover, NH	ESPN+	L 28–31	4,417
October 3	1:30 p.m.	Penn^{†}	Memorial Field; Hanover, NH	ESPN+	W 14–10	5,956
October 10	12:00 p.m.	at Yale	Yale Bowl; New Haven, CT	ESPNU	L 7–28	6,320
October 17	1:30 p.m.	Merrimack*	Memorial Field; Hanover, NH	ESPN+	W 27–21	2,660
October 24	1:30 p.m.	at Columbia	Wien Stadium; Manhattan, NY	ESPN+	W 38–18	12,932
October 30	7:00 p.m.	No. 13 Harvard	Memorial Field; Hanover, NH (rivalry)	ESPNU	W 24–14	4,074
November 7	12:00 p.m.	at Princeton	Princeton Stadium; Princeton, NJ	ESPN+	L 14–21	4,549
November 14	1:00 p.m.	at Cornell	Schoellkopf Field; Ithaca, NY (rivalry)	ESPN+	L 14–20	1,333
November 21	1:00 p.m.	Brown	Memorial Field; Hanover, NH	ESPN+	W 17–7	3,418
*Non-conference game; ^{†}Homecoming; Rankings from STATS Poll released prior to the game; All times are in Eastern time; Source:

== Game summaries ==
=== at No. 7 Lehigh ===
Dartmouth Big Green (0–0) at No. 7 Lehigh Mountain Hawks (3–0) – Game summary

Quarter	1	2	3	4	Total
Big Green	3	10	7	0	20
No. 7 Mountain Hawks	7	7	3	7	24

at Goodman Stadium • Lower Saucon Township, Pennsylvania

- Date: September 19
- Game time: 12:00 p.m.
- Game weather: Sunny
- Game attendance: 8,902
- Referee: Jay Johnson
- TV announcers (ESPN+): Marco Socci and Mike Yadush

Game information

First quarter

- LEH – Luke Yoder 1-yard run (Connor Poole kick), 8:29. Mountain Hawks 7–0. Drive: 10 plays, 67 yards, 5:04.
- DART – Owen Zalc 50-yard field goal, 4:54. Mountain Hawks 7–3. Drive: 9 plays, 43 yards, 3:35.

Second quarter

- DART – Owen Zalc 51-yard field goal, 13:10. Mountain Hawks 7–6. Drive: 9 plays, 41 yards, 5:21.
- LEH – Nick Palumbo 13-yard pass from Derek Morgan (Connor Poole kick), 4:09. Mountain Hawks 14–6. Drive: 15 plays, 80 yards, 8:57.
- DART – KyDric Fisher 33-yard pass from Grayson Saunier (Owen Zalc kick), 0:35. Mountain Hawks 14–13. Drive: 9 plays, 75 yards, 3:34.

Third quarter

- LEH – Connor Poole 27-yard field goal, 6:38. Mountain Hawks 17–13. Drive: 16 plays, 65 yards, 8:22.
- DART – Myles Craddock 2-yard run (Owen Zalc kick), 0:02. Big Green 20–17. Drive: 10 plays, 75 yards, 6:36.

Fourth quarter

- LEH – Luke Yoder 2-yard run (Connor Poole kick), 8:41. Mountain Hawks 24–20. Drive: 11 plays, 75 yards, 6:21.

Statistics	DART	LEH
First downs	18	20
Plays–yards	59–324	59–291
Rushes–yards	29–62	46–218
Passing yards	262	73
Passing: comp–att–int	17–30–1	10–13–0
Turnovers	1	0
Time of possession	28:12	31:48

Team	Category	Player	Statistics
Dartmouth	Passing	Grayson Saunier	17/30, 262 yards, TD, INT
Dartmouth	Rushing	Myles Craddock	13 carries, 33 yards, TD
Dartmouth	Receiving	Nick Lemon	5 receptions, 102 yards
Lehigh	Passing	Derek Morgan	10/13, 73 yards, TD
Lehigh	Rushing	Luke Yoder	27 carries, 150 yards, 2 TD
Lehigh	Receiving	Nick Palumbo	6 receptions, 52 yards, TD

=== Monmouth ===
Monmouth Hawks (2–2) at Dartmouth Big Green (0–1) – Game summary

Quarter	1	2	3	4	Total
Hawks	0	0	0	0	0
Big Green	0	0	0	0	0

at Memorial Stadium • Hanover, New Hampshire

- Date: September 26
- Game time: 1:00 p.m.

Game information

First quarter
Second quarter
Third quarter
Fourth quarter

Statistics	MONM	DART
First downs		
Plays–yards		
Rushes–yards		
Passing yards		
Passing: comp–att–int		
Turnovers		
Time of possession		

Team	Category	Player	Statistics
Monmouth	Passing		
Monmouth	Rushing		
Monmouth	Receiving		
Dartmouth	Passing		
Dartmouth	Rushing		
Dartmouth	Receiving		

=== Penn ===
Penn Quakers (1–1) at Dartmouth Big Green (0–2) – Game summary

Quarter	1	2	3	4	Total
Quakers	0	3	0	7	10
Big Green	7	0	0	7	14

at Memorial Field • Hanover, New Hampshire

- Date: October 3
- Game time: 1:30 p.m.
- Game weather: Sunny • Temperature: 61 °F (16 °C)
- Game attendance: 5,956
- Referee: Antonio Marcella
- TV announcers (ESPN+): Matt Corsetti and Jarod Richmond

Game information

First quarter

- DART – KyDric Fisher 16-yard pass from Grayson Saunier (Owen Zalc kick), 3:36. Big Green 7–0. Drive: 13 plays, 80 yards, 7:04.

Second quarter

- PENN – Mason Walters 26-yard field goal, 0:33. Big Green 7–3. Drive: 13 plays, 74 yards, 2:47.

Third quarter

- No scoring plays.

Fourth quarter

- PENN – Donte West 1-yard run (Mason Walters kick), 8:47. Quakers 10–7. Drive: 16 plays, 80 yards, 8:14.
- DART – Myles Craddock 2-yard run (Owen Zalc kick), 4:55. Big Green 14–10. Drive: 8 plays, 75 yards, 3:52.

Statistics	PENN	DART
First downs	22	16
Plays–yards	73–360	50–312
Rushes–yards	34–146	35–139
Passing yards	214	173
Passing: comp–att–int	27–39–0	13–15–0
Turnovers	0	0
Time of possession	32:33	27:27

Team	Category	Player	Statistics
Penn	Passing	Miles Teodecki	27/39, 214 yards
Penn	Rushing	Miles Teodecki	11 carries, 54 yards
Penn	Receiving	Mason Page	8 receptions, 64 yards
Dartmouth	Passing	Grayson Saunier	13/15, 173 yards, TD
Dartmouth	Rushing	Myles Craddock	21 carries, 85 yards
Dartmouth	Receiving	Nick Lemon	3 receptions, 56 yards

=== at Yale ===
Dartmouth Big Green (1–2) at Yale Bulldogs (2–1) – Game summary

Quarter	1	2	3	4	Total
Big Green	0	0	0	0	0
Bulldogs	0	0	0	0	0

at Yale Bowl • New Haven, Connecticut

- Date: October 10
- Game time: 12:00 p.m.

Game information

First quarter
Second quarter
Third quarter
Fourth quarter

Statistics	DART	YALE
First downs		
Plays–yards		
Rushes–yards		
Passing yards		
Passing: comp–att–int		
Turnovers		
Time of possession		

Team	Category	Player	Statistics
Dartmouth	Passing		
Dartmouth	Rushing		
Dartmouth	Receiving		
Yale	Passing		
Yale	Rushing		
Yale	Receiving		

=== Merrimack ===
Merrimack Warriors (2–4) at Dartmouth Big Green (1–3) – Game summary

Quarter	1	2	3	4	Total
Warriors	0	0	0	0	0
Big Green	0	0	0	0	0

at Memorial Field • Hanover, New Hampshire

- Date: October 17

Game information

First quarter
Second quarter
Third quarter
Fourth quarter

Statistics	MRMK	DART
First downs		
Plays–yards		
Rushes–yards		
Passing yards		
Passing: comp–att–int		
Turnovers		
Time of possession		

Team	Category	Player	Statistics
Merrimack	Passing		
Merrimack	Rushing		
Merrimack	Receiving		
Dartmouth	Passing		
Dartmouth	Rushing		
Dartmouth	Receiving		

=== at Columbia ===
Dartmouth Big Green (2–3) at Columbia Lions (4–1) – Game summary

Quarter	1	2	3	4	Total
Big Green	7	14	7	10	38
Lions	3	7	0	8	18

at Lawrence A. Wien Stadium • Manhattan, New York

- Date: October 24
- Game time: 1:30 p.m.
- Game weather: Sunny • Temperature: 60 °F (16 °C) • Wind: W at 5 miles per hour (8.0 km/h)
- Game attendance: 12,932
- Referee: Anthony Florio
- TV announcers (ESPN+): Lance Medow (play-by-play) and Shawn FitzGerald (analyst)

Game information

First quarter

- DART – Myles Craddock 14-yard run (Owen Zalc kick), 9:50. Big Green 7–0. Drive: 11 plays, 75 yards, 4:58.
- COLU – Hugo Merry 22-yard field goal, 1:31. Big Green 7–3. Drive: 10 plays, 53 yards, 3:54.

Second quarter

- DART – Jacob Henry 3-yard run (Owen Zalc kick), 10:21. Big Green 14–3. Drive: 6 plays, 61 yards, 2:42.
- COLU – Hutch Crow 30-yard pass from Chase Goodwin (Hugo Merry kick), 6:40. Big Green 14–10. Drive: 10 plays, 75 yards, 3:41.
- DART – Grayson Saunier 1-yard run (Owen Zalc kick), 0:55. Big Green 21–10. Drive: 10 plays, 80 yards, 3:14.

Third quarter

- DART – Grayson Saunier 1-yard run (Owen Zalc kick), 2:52. Big Green 28–10. Drive: 15 plays, 83 yards, 9:35.

Fourth quarter

- COLU – Bryce Coleman 14-yard pass from Chase Goodwin (Braden Dougherty pass), 14:50. Big Green 28–18. Drive: 8 plays, 75 yards, 3:02.
- DART – Owen Zalc 41-yard field goal, 10:08. Big Green 31–18. Drive: 7 plays, -3 yards, 3:40.
- DART – Grayson Saunier 68-yard run (Owen Zalc kick), 1:42. Big Green 38–18. Drive: 5 plays, 80 yards, 1:14.

Statistics	DART	COLU
First downs	19	20
Plays–yards	70–419	73–355
Rushes–yards	46–247	33–146
Passing yards	172	209
Passing: comp–att–int	14–24–0	20–40–3
Turnovers	0	3
Time of possession	32:28	27:32

Team	Category	Player	Statistics
Dartmouth	Passing	Grayson Saunier	14/24, 172 yards
Dartmouth	Rushing	Myles Craddock	23 carries, 128 yards, TD
Dartmouth	Receiving	James Elliott	3 receptions, 61 yards
Columbia	Passing	Chase Goodwin	20/40, 209 yards, 2 TD, 3 INT
Columbia	Rushing	Griffin Johnson	15 carries, 73 yards
Columbia	Receiving	Hutch Crow	7 receptions, 94 yards, TD

=== No. 13 Harvard (rivalry) ===
No. 13 Harvard Crimson (6–0) at Dartmouth Big Green (3–3) – Game summary

Quarter	1	2	3	4	Total
No. 13 Crimson	0	14	0	0	14
Big Green	7	14	0	3	24

at Memorial Field • Hanover, New Hampshire

- Date: October 30
- Game time: 7:00 p.m.
- Game weather: Cloudy • Temperature: 50 °F (10 °C)
- Game attendance: 4,074
- Referee: Jeremy DeAngulo
- TV announcers (ESPNU): Eric Frede (play-by-play) and Jack Ford (analyst)

Game information

First quarter

- DART – Grayson Saunier 1-yard run (Owen Zalc kick), 9:33. Big Green 7–0. Drive: 6 plays, 18 yards, 2:52.

Second quarter

- DART – Dylan Elder 2-yard pass from Grayson Saunier (Owen Zalc kick), 10:50. Big Green 14–0. Drive: 11 plays, 61 yards, 5:16.
- HARV – Nathan Bailey 13-yard pass from Charlie Smith (Kieran Corr kick), 6:41. Big Green 14–7. Drive: 2 plays, 35 yards, 0:22.
- DART – Nick Lemon 9-yard pass from Grayson Saunier (Owen Zalc kick), 1:44. Big Green 21–7. Drive: 11 plays, 75 yards, 4:57.
- HARV – Ryan Tattersall 38-yard pass from Charlie Smith (Kieran Corr kick), 1:02. Big Green 21–14. Drive: 4 plays, 75 yards, 0:42.

Third quarter

No scoring plays

Fourth quarter

- DART – Owen Zalc 30-yard field goal, 4:22. Big Green 24–14. Drive: 14 plays, 59 yards, 7:17.

Statistics	HARV	DART
First downs	26	18
Plays–yards	66–404	68–271
Rushes–yards	29–127	56–229
Passing yards	277	42
Passing: comp–att–int	23–37–5	5–12–3
Turnovers	5	3
Time of possession	25:48	34:12

Team	Category	Player	Statistics
Harvard	Passing	Charlie Smith	23/37, 277 yards, 2 TD, 5 INT
Harvard	Rushing	DJ Gordon	14 carries, 77 yards
Harvard	Receiving	Ryan Tattersall	6 receptions, 94 yards, TD
Dartmouth	Passing	Grayson Saunier	5/12, 42 yards, 2 TD, 3 INT
Dartmouth	Rushing	Grayson Saunier	20 carries, 109 yards, TD
Dartmouth	Receiving	Nick Lemon	2 receptions, 30 yards, TD

=== at Princeton ===
Dartmouth Big Green (4–3) at Princeton Tigers (5–2) – Game summary

Quarter	1	2	3	4	Total
Big Green	0	0	0	0	0
Tigers	0	0	0	0	0

at Princeton Stadium • Princeton, New Jersey

- Date: November 7
- Game time: 12:00 p.m.

Game information

First quarter
Second quarter
Third quarter
Fourth quarter

Statistics	DART	PRIN
First downs		
Plays–yards		
Rushes–yards		
Passing yards		
Passing: comp–att–int		
Turnovers		
Time of possession		

Team	Category	Player	Statistics
Dartmouth	Passing		
Dartmouth	Rushing		
Dartmouth	Receiving		
Princeton	Passing		
Princeton	Rushing		
Princeton	Receiving		

=== at Cornell (rivalry) ===
Dartmouth Big Green (4–4) at Cornell Big Red (3–5) – Game summary

Quarter	1	2	3	4	Total
Big Green	0	0	0	0	0
Big Red	0	0	0	0	0

at Schoellkopf Field • Ithaca, New York

- Date: November 14
- Game time: 1:00 p.m.
- TV: ESPN+

Game information

First quarter
Second quarter
Third quarter
Fourth quarter

Statistics	DART	COR
First downs		
Plays–yards		
Rushes–yards		
Passing yards		
Passing: comp–att–int		
Turnovers		
Time of possession		

Team	Category	Player	Statistics
Dartmouth	Passing		
Dartmouth	Rushing		
Dartmouth	Receiving		
Cornell	Passing		
Cornell	Rushing		
Cornell	Receiving		

=== Brown ===
Brown Bears (6–3) at Dartmouth Big Green (4–5) – Game summary

Quarter	1	2	3	4	Total
Bears	0	0	0	0	0
Big Green	0	0	0	0	0

at Memorial Stadium • Hanover, New Hampshire

- Date: November 21
- Game time: 1:00 p.m.

Game information

First quarter
Second quarter
Third quarter
Fourth quarter

Statistics	BRWN	DART
First downs		
Plays–yards		
Rushes–yards		
Passing yards		
Passing: comp–att–int		
Turnovers		
Time of possession		

Team	Category	Player	Statistics
Brown	Passing		
Brown	Rushing		
Brown	Receiving		
Dartmouth	Passing		
Dartmouth	Rushing		
Dartmouth	Receiving		

== Rankings ==
Ranking movements Legend: — = Not ranked RV = Received votes
	Week														
Poll	Pre	1	2	3	4	5	6	7	8	9	10	11	12	13	Final
STATS	—	—	—	—	—	—	—								
Coaches	RV	RV	RV	RV	RV	RV	RV								
