= 2026 Cornell Big Red football team =

American college football season

2026 Cornell Big Red football
- Conference: Ivy League
- Record: 4–6 (2–5 Ivy)
- Head coach: Dan Swanstrom (3rd season)
- Co-offensive coordinators: Mike Hatcher (3rd season); Sean Reeder (3rd season)
- Defensive coordinator: Mike Toerper (1st season)
- Home stadium: Schoellkopf Field

Uniform
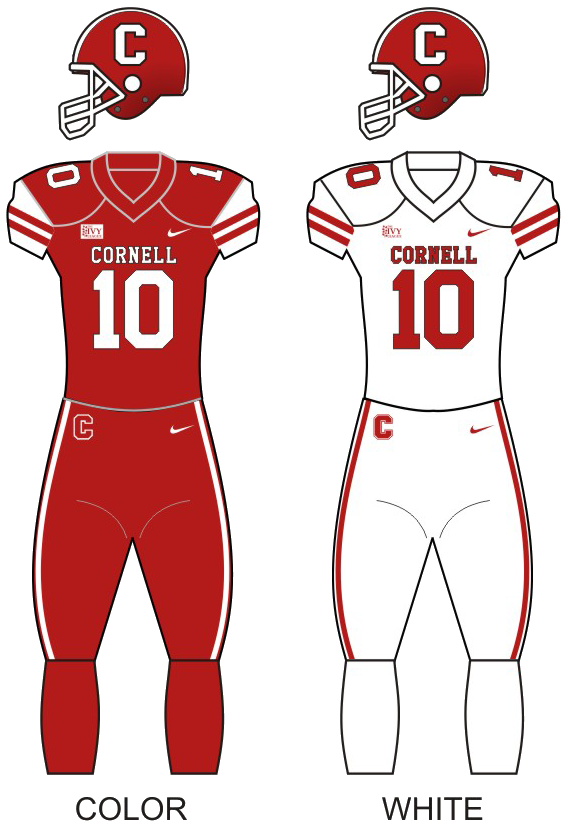

2026 Ivy League football standings
	Conf.			Overall
Team	W		L	W		L
No. 17 Harvard +^	5	–	1	8	–	1
Princeton	4	–	2	6	–	3
Brown	4	–	2	6	–	3
Yale	3	–	3	5	–	4
Dartmouth	3	–	3	4	–	5
Penn	2	–	4	4	–	5
Cornell	2	–	4	4	–	5
Columbia	1	–	5	4	–	5
+ – Conference co-champions; ^ – FCS playoff participant; As of November 22, 2026; Rankings from STATS Poll

The 2026 Cornell Big Red football team will represent Cornell University as a member of the Ivy League during the 2026 NCAA Division I FCS football season. The team will be led by third-year head coach Dan Swanstrom and play its home games at Schoellkopf Field in Ithaca, New York.

== Schedule ==
Date	Time	Opponent	Site	TV	Result	Attendance
September 19	1:00 p.m.	at Colgate*	Andy Kerr Stadium; Hamilton, NY (rivalry)	ESPN+	L 7–20	5,287
September 26	1:00 p.m.	No. 17 Yale	Schoellkopf Field; Ithaca, NY	ESPN+	W 38–25	12,542
October 3	12:30 p.m.	at Georgetown*	Cooper Field; Washington, D.C.	ESPN+	W 35–14	2,500
October 10	1:00 p.m.	No. 18 Harvard	Schoellkopf Field; Ithaca, NY	ESPN+	L 29–41	5,418
October 17	2:00 p.m.	No. 4 Lehigh*^{†}	Schoellkopf Field; Ithaca, NY	ESPN+	W 48–38	9,198
October 24	12:00 p.m.	at Brown	Brown Stadium; Providence, RI	ESPN+	L 31–38 ^{OT}	5,605
October 31	12:00 p.m.	at Princeton	Princeton Stadium; Princeton, NJ	ESPN+	L 20–21	5,097
November 7	1:00 p.m.	Penn	Schoellkopf Field; Ithaca, NY (Trustee's Cup)	ESPN+	L 13–14	1,740
November 14	1:00 p.m.	Dartmouth	Schoellkopf Field; Ithaca, NY (rivalry)	ESPN+	W 20–14	1,333
November 21	12:00 p.m.	at Columbia	Wien Stadium; Manhattan, NY (rivalry)	ESPN+	L 45–46 ^{OT}	4,065
*Non-conference game; ^{†}Homecoming; Rankings from STATS Poll released prior to the game; All times are in Eastern time; Source:

== Game summaries ==
=== at Colgate (rivalry) ===
Cornell Big Red (0–0) at Colgate Raiders (2–1) – Game summary

Quarter	1	2	3	4	Total
Big Red	0	0	0	0	0
Raiders	0	0	0	0	0

at Andy Kerr Stadium • Hamilton, New York

- Date: September 19
- Game time: 1:00 p.m.
- TV: ESPN+

Game information

First quarter
Second quarter
Third quarter
Fourth quarter

Statistics	COR	COLG
First downs		
Plays–yards		
Rushes–yards		
Passing yards		
Passing: comp–att–int		
Turnovers		
Time of possession		

Team	Category	Player	Statistics
Cornell	Passing		
Cornell	Rushing		
Cornell	Receiving		
Colgate	Passing		
Colgate	Rushing		
Colgate	Receiving		

=== No. 17 Yale ===
No. 17 Yale Bulldogs (1–0) at Cornell Big Red (0–1) – Game summary

Quarter	1	2	3	4	Total
No. 17 Bulldogs	0	0	0	0	0
Big Red	0	0	0	0	0

at Schoellkopf Field • Ithaca, New York

- Date: September 26
- Game time: 1:00 p.m.

Game information

First quarter
Second quarter
Third quarter
Fourth quarter

Statistics	YALE	COR
First downs		
Plays–yards		
Rushes–yards		
Passing yards		
Passing: comp–att–int		
Turnovers		
Time of possession		

Team	Category	Player	Statistics
Yale	Passing		
Yale	Rushing		
Yale	Receiving		
Cornell	Passing		
Cornell	Rushing		
Cornell	Receiving		

=== at Georgetown ===
Cornell Big Red (1–1) at Georgetown Hoyas (0–3) – Game summary

Quarter	1	2	3	4	Total
Big Red	0	0	0	0	0
Hoyas	0	0	0	0	0

at Cooper Field • Washington, DC

- Date: October 3
- Game time: 12:30 p.m.
- TV: ESPN+

Game information

First quarter
Second quarter
Third quarter
Fourth quarter

Statistics	COR	GTWN
First downs		
Plays–yards		
Rushes–yards		
Passing yards		
Passing: comp–att–int		
Turnovers		
Time of possession		

Team	Category	Player	Statistics
Cornell	Passing		
Cornell	Rushing		
Cornell	Receiving		
Georgetown	Passing		
Georgetown	Rushing		
Georgetown	Receiving		

=== No. 18 Harvard ===
No. 18 Harvard Crimson (3–0) at Cornell Big Red (2–1) – Game summary

Quarter	1	2	3	4	Total
No. 18 Crimson	0	21	17	3	41
Big Red	10	0	0	19	29

at Schoellkopf Field • Ithaca, New York

- Date: October 10
- Game time: 1:00 p.m.
- Game weather: Sunny • Temperature: 68 °F (20 °C) • Wind: SE at 8 miles per hour (13 km/h)
- Game attendance: 5,418
- Referee: Anthony Florio
- TV announcers (ESPN+): Nick DeLuca (play-by-play) and Matt Miller (analyst)

Game information

First quarter

- COR – Alan Zhao 43-yard field goal, 9:18. Big Red 3–0. Drive: 13 plays, 49 yards, 5:42.
- COR – Garrett Bass-Sulpizio 2-yard run (Alan Zhao kick), 3:54. Big Red 10–0. Drive: 11 plays, 76 yards, 5:15.

Second quarter

- HARV – Kise Flannery 1-yard run (Kieran Corr kick), 14:22. Big Red 10–7. Drive: 10 plays, 75 yards, 4:32.
- HARV – Tafari Moe 36-yard pass from Charlie Smith (Kieran Corr kick), 8:32. Crimson 14–10. Drive: 7 plays, 85 yards, 3:31.
- HARV – Henry Shoemaker 16-yard pass from Charlie Smith (Kieran Corr kick), 1:08. Crimson 21–10. Drive: 8 plays, 71 yards, 3:00.

Third quarter

- HARV – Xaviah Bascon 4-yard run (Kieran Corr kick), 11:05. Crimson 28–10. Drive: 8 plays, 70 yards, 3:55.
- HARV – Kieran Corr 51-yard field goal, 8:25. Crimson 31–10. Drive: 4 plays, 0 yards, 1:29.
- HARV – Teigan Pelletier 28-yard pass from Charlie Smith (Kieran Corr kick), 6:24. Crimson 38–10. Drive: 2 plays, 30 yards, 0:39.

Fourth quarter

- HARV – Kieran Corr 27-yard field goal, 12:19. Crimson 41–10. Drive: 15 plays, 77 yards, 7:39.
- COR – Ean Pope 61-yard run (Alan Zhao kick), 10:16. Crimson 41–17. Drive: 4 plays, 75 yards, 2:03.
- COR – Samuel Musungu 3-yard pass from Garrett Bass-Sulpizio, 5:45. Crimson 41–23. Drive: 14 plays, 52 yards, 4:30.
- COR – JaVon Broussard 21-yard pass from Garrett Bass-Sulpizio, 1:55. Crimson 41–29. Drive: 10 plays, 73 yards, 2:39.

Statistics	HARV	COR
First downs	24	24
Plays–yards	62–380	78–398
Rushes–yards	35–105	40–240
Passing yards	275	158
Passing: comp–att–int	23–27–1	20–38–2
Turnovers	1	2
Time of possession	28:38	31:22

Team	Category	Player	Statistics
Harvard	Passing	Charlie Smith	23/27, 275 yards, 3 TD, INT
Harvard	Rushing	Xaviah Bascon	12 carries, 59 yards, TD
Harvard	Receiving	Nathan Bailey	7 receptions, 64 yards
Cornell	Passing	Garrett Bass-Sulpizio	20/38, 158 yards, 2 TD, 2 INT
Cornell	Rushing	Ean Pope	7 carries, 91 yards, TD
Cornell	Receiving	JaVon Broussard	4 receptions, 46 yards, TD

=== No. 4 Lehigh ===
No. 4 Lehigh Mountain Hawks (6–0) at Cornell Big Red (2–2) – Game summary

Quarter	1	2	3	4	Total
No. 4 Mountain Hawks	0	0	0	0	0
Big Red	0	0	0	0	0

at Schoellkopf Field • Ithaca, New York

- Date: October 17
- Game time: 2:00 p.m.

Game information

First quarter
Second quarter
Third quarter
Fourth quarter

Statistics	LEH	COR
First downs		
Plays–yards		
Rushes–yards		
Passing yards		
Passing: comp–att–int		
Turnovers		
Time of possession		

Team	Category	Player	Statistics
Lehigh	Passing		
Lehigh	Rushing		
Lehigh	Receiving		
Cornell	Passing		
Cornell	Rushing		
Cornell	Receiving		

=== at Brown ===
Cornell Big Red (3–2) at Brown Bears (2–3) – Game summary

Quarter	1	2	3	4	OT	Total
Big Red	0	21	10	0	0	31
Bears	7	3	7	14	7	38

at Brown Stadium • Providence, Rhode Island

- Date: October 24
- Game time: 12:00 p.m.
- Game weather: Sunny • Temperature: 62 °F (17 °C) • Wind: NE at 10 miles per hour (16 km/h)
- Game attendance: 5,605
- Referee: Terry Jones
- TV announcers (ESPN+): Scott Cordischi (play-by-play), John Anderson (analyst) and Jorge Bannister (sideline)

Game information

First quarter

- BRWN – Pearson Hill 31-yard pass from James Murphy (Drew Crabtree kick), 3:39. Bears 7–0. Drive: 13 plays, 70 yards, 6:01.

Second quarter

- COR – Garrett Bass-Sulpizio 5-yard run (Alan Zhao kick), 13:42. Tied 7–7. Drive: 11 plays, 85 yards, 4:52.
- COR – Garrett Bass-Sulpizio 12-yard run (Alan Zhao kick), 7:33. Big Red 14–7. Drive: 4 plays, 35 yards, 1:31.
- COR – Garrett Bass-Sulpizio 1-yard run (Alan Zhao kick), 5:23. Big Red 21–7. Drive: 5 plays, 34 yards, 2:01.
- BRWN – Drew Crabtree 28-yard field goal, 0:25. Big Red 21–10. Drive: 8 plays, 63 yards, 1:28.

Third quarter

- COR – Caden Lesiewicz 27-yard field goal, 9:57. Big Red 24–10. Drive: 6 plays, 30 yards, 2:12.
- BRWN – Matt Childs 6-yard run (Drew Crabtree kick), 5:53. Big Red 24–17. Drive: 3 plays, 18 yards, 1:07.
- COR – Brendan Lee 12-yard pass from Garrett Bass-Sulpizio (Alan Zhao kick), 3:09. Big Red 31–17. Drive: 7 plays, 75 yards, 2:44.

Fourth quarter

- BRWN – Saphir Miller 50-yard pass from James Murphy (Drew Crabtree kick), 13:48. Big Red 31–24. Drive: 7 plays, 99 yards, 2:42.
- BRWN – Matt Childs 9-yard pass from James Murphy (Drew Crabtree kick), 0:00. Tied 31–31. Drive: 18 plays, 84 yards, 4:25.

Overtime

- BRWN – Matt Childs 25-yard run (Drew Crabtree kick). Bears 38–31. Drive: 1 play, 25 yards, 0:00.

Statistics	COR	BRWN
First downs	22	28
Plays–yards	74–405	87–463
Rushes–yards	32–128	37–138
Passing yards	277	325
Passing: comp–att–int	25–42–2	31–50–2
Turnovers	2	4
Time of possession	30:05	29:55

Team	Category	Player	Statistics
Cornell	Passing	Garrett Bass-Sulpizio	25/42, 277 yards, TD, 2 INT
Cornell	Rushing	Brendan Lee	5 carries, 47 yards
Cornell	Receiving	Xavier Bowman	8 receptions, 69 yards
Brown	Passing	James Murphy	31/50, 325 yards, 3 TD, 2 INT
Brown	Rushing	Matt Childs	17 carries, 72 yards, 2 TD
Brown	Receiving	Matt Childs	10 receptions, 85 yards, TD

=== at Princeton ===
Cornell Big Red (3–3) at Princeton Tigers (4–2) – Game summary

Quarter	1	2	3	4	Total
Big Red	0	0	0	0	0
Tigers	0	0	0	0	0

at Princeton Stadium • Princeton, New Jersey

- Date: October 31
- Game time: 12:00 p.m.

Game information

First quarter
Second quarter
Third quarter
Fourth quarter

Statistics	COR	PRIN
First downs		
Plays–yards		
Rushes–yards		
Passing yards		
Passing: comp–att–int		
Turnovers		
Time of possession		

Team	Category	Player	Statistics
Cornell	Passing		
Cornell	Rushing		
Cornell	Receiving		
Princeton	Passing		
Princeton	Rushing		
Princeton	Receiving		

=== Penn (Trustee's Cup) ===
Penn Quakers (3–4) at Cornell Big Red (3–4) – Game summary

Quarter	1	2	3	4	Total
Quakers	0	7	7	0	14
Big Red	7	3	3	0	13

at Schoellkopf Field • Ithaca, New York

- Date: November 7
- Game time: 1:00 p.m.
- Game weather: Rain • Temperature: 47 °F (8 °C) • Wind: SW at 4 miles per hour (6.4 km/h)
- Game attendance: 1,740
- Referee: Jay Johnson
- TV announcers (ESPN+): Nick DeLuca (play-by-play) and Matt Miller (analyst)

Game information

First quarter

- COR – Jordan Triplett 1-yard run (Caden Lesiewicz kick), 5:44. Big Red 7–0. Drive: 15 plays, 75 yards, 9:12.

Second quarter

- COR – Caden Lesiewicz 27-yard field goal, 3:46. Big Red 10–0. Drive: 11 plays, 57 yards, 5:49.
- PENN – Ronan Johannson 6-yard pass from Karson Siqueiros-Lasky (Mason Walters kick), 1:18. Big Red 10–7. Drive: 7 plays, 68 yards, 2:22.

Third quarter

- COR – Caden Lesiewicz 34-yard field goal, 3:39. Big Red 13–7. Drive: 4 plays, -2 yards, 2:04.
- PENN – Sean Williams Jr. 2-yard run (Mason Walters kick), 0:29. Quakers 14–13. Drive: 9 plays, 77 yards, 3:05.

Fourth quarter

No scoring plays

Statistics	PENN	COR
First downs	17	15
Plays–yards	67–258	64–239
Rushes–yards	28–38	38–158
Passing yards	220	81
Passing: comp–att–int	24–39–0	9–26–0
Turnovers	0	0
Time of possession	29:35	30:25

Team	Category	Player	Statistics
Penn	Passing	Karson Siqueiros-Lasky	24/38, 220 yards, TD
Penn	Rushing	Sean Williams Jr.	18 carries, 55 yards, TD
Penn	Receiving	Isaac Lee	9 receptions, 106 yards
Cornell	Passing	Michael McColgan	5/22, 47 yards
Cornell	Rushing	Michael McColgan	16 carries, 83 yards
Cornell	Receiving	Brendan Lee	4 receptions, 36 yards

=== Dartmouth (rivalry) ===
Dartmouth Big Green (4–4) at Cornell Big Red (3–5) – Game summary

Quarter	1	2	3	4	Total
Big Green	0	0	0	0	0
Big Red	0	0	0	0	0

at Schoellkopf Field • Ithaca, New York

- Date: November 14
- Game time: 1:00 p.m.
- TV: ESPN+

Game information

First quarter
Second quarter
Third quarter
Fourth quarter

Statistics	DART	COR
First downs		
Plays–yards		
Rushes–yards		
Passing yards		
Passing: comp–att–int		
Turnovers		
Time of possession		

Team	Category	Player	Statistics
Dartmouth	Passing		
Dartmouth	Rushing		
Dartmouth	Receiving		
Cornell	Passing		
Cornell	Rushing		
Cornell	Receiving		

=== at Columbia (rivalry) ===
Cornell Big Red (4–5) at Columbia Lions (4–5) – Game summary

Quarter	1	2	3	4	Total
Big Red	0	0	0	0	0
Lions	0	0	0	0	0

at Lawrence A. Wien Stadium • Manhattan, New York

- Date: November 21
- Game time: 12:00 p.m.

Game information

First quarter
Second quarter
Third quarter
Fourth quarter

Statistics	COR	COLU
First downs		
Plays–yards		
Rushes–yards		
Passing yards		
Passing: comp–att–int		
Turnovers		
Time of possession		

Team	Category	Player	Statistics
Cornell	Passing		
Cornell	Rushing		
Cornell	Receiving		
Columbia	Passing		
Columbia	Rushing		
Columbia	Receiving		
