= 2025 Harvard Crimson football team =

American college football season

2025 Harvard Crimson football

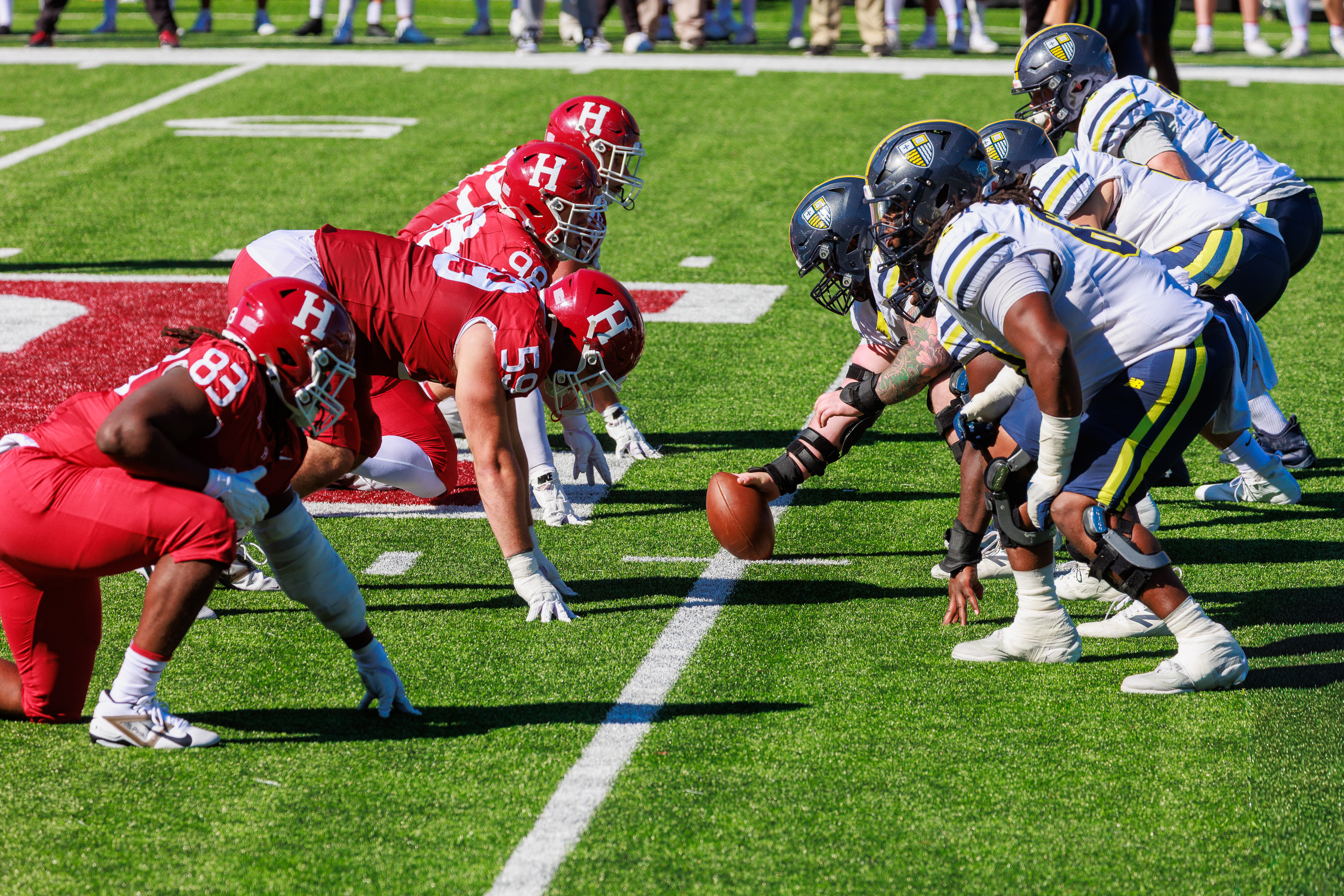
- Harvard defeats Merrimack, 31–7

Ivy League co-champion

NCAA Division I First Round, L 7–52 vs. Villanova
- Conference: Ivy League

Ranking
- STATS: No. 20
- FCS Coaches: No. 23
- Record: 9–2 (6–1 Ivy)
- Head coach: Andrew Aurich (2nd season)
- Offensive coordinator: Mickey Fein (5th season)
- Offensive scheme: Pro spread
- Defensive coordinator: Scott Larkee (16th season)
- Base defense: 4–3
- Captain: Ty Bartrum
- Home stadium: Harvard Stadium

2025 Ivy League football standings
	Conf.			Overall
Team	W		L	W		L
No. 15 Yale +^	6	–	1	9	–	3
No. 20 Harvard +^	6	–	1	9	–	2
Dartmouth	4	–	3	7	–	3
Penn	4	–	3	6	–	4
Cornell	3	–	4	4	–	6
Princeton	2	–	5	3	–	7
Brown	2	–	5	5	–	5
Columbia	1	–	6	2	–	8
+ – Conference co-champions; ^ – FCS playoff participant; Rankings from STATS Poll

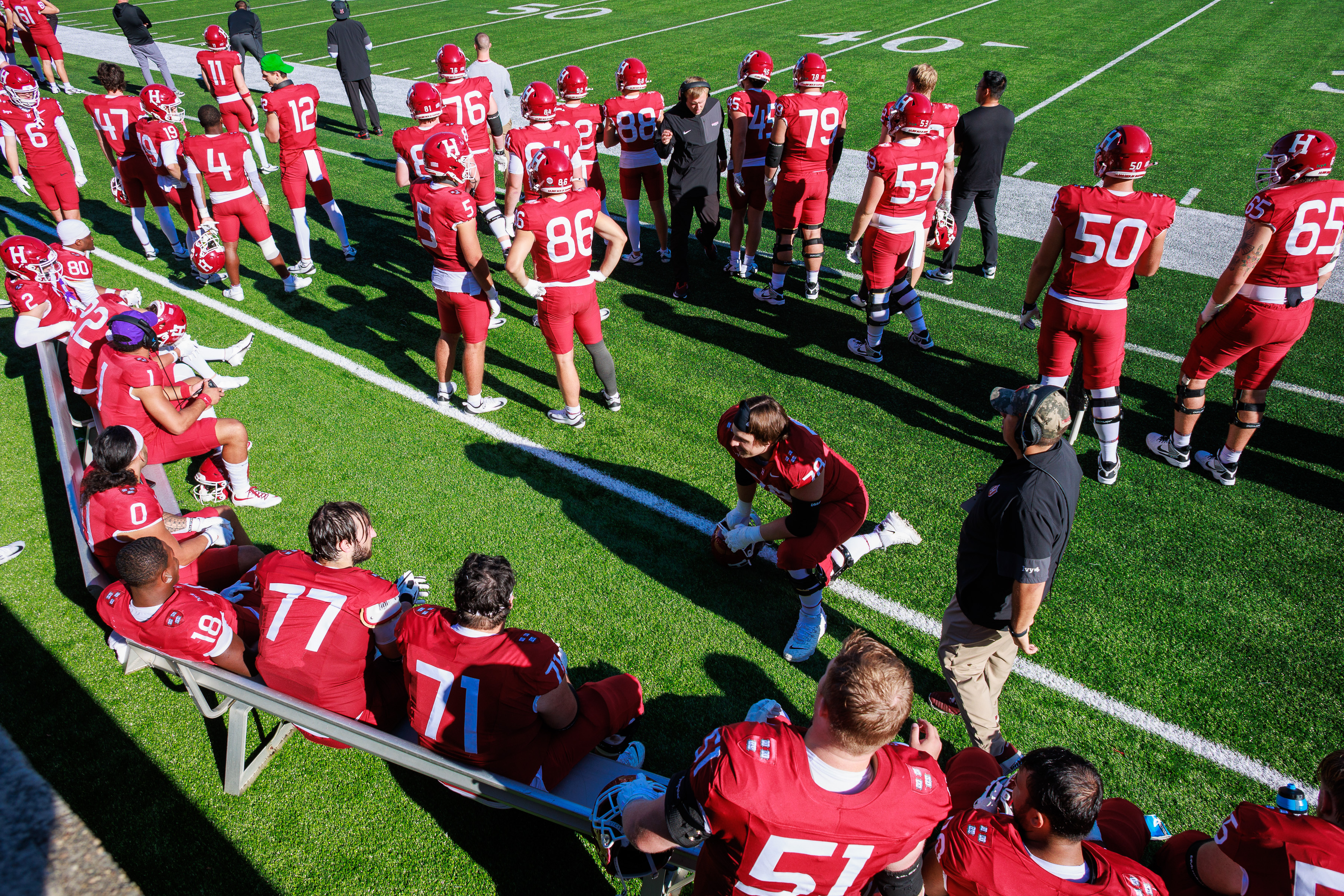
2025 Crimson players

The 2025 Harvard Crimson football team represented Harvard University as a member of the Ivy League during the 2025 NCAA Division I FCS football season. The team played its home games at Harvard Stadium in Boston and were led by second-year head coach Andrew Aurich.

On December 18, 2024, the Ivy League announced that it would begin participating in the NCAA Division I Football Championship playoffs starting with the 2025 season. The Crimson received an at-large bid after falling to rival Yale in the final regular season game to finish as conference co-champions.

== Schedule ==
Date	Time	Opponent	Rank	Site	TV	Result	Attendance
September 20	1:00 p.m.	at Stetson*		Spec Martin Stadium; Deland, FL	ESPN+	W 59–7	1,400
September 27	6:00 p.m.	Brown		Harvard Stadium; Boston, MA	ESPN+	W 41–7	16,283
October 4	2:00 p.m.	at Holy Cross*	No. 25	Fitton Field; Worcester, MA	ESPN+	W 59–24	15,549
October 10	7:00 p.m.	Cornell	No. 22	Harvard Stadium; Boston, MA	ESPNU	W 34–10	6,644
October 18	12:00 p.m.	Merrimack*	No. 18	Harvard Stadium; Boston, MA	ESPN+	W 31−7	5,661
October 25	12:00 p.m.	at Princeton	No. 14	Powers Field at Princeton Stadium; Princeton, NJ (rivalry)	ESPN+	W 35–14	9,137
November 1	3:00 p.m.	Dartmouth	No. 12	Harvard Stadium; Boston, MA (rivalry)	ESPN+	W 31–10	11,334
November 7	7:00 p.m.	at Columbia	No. 9	Robert K. Kraft Field at Lawrence A. Wien Stadium; New York, NY	ESPNU	W 31–14	3,644
November 15	12:00 p.m.	Penn	No. 7	Harvard Stadium; Boston, MA (rivalry)	ESPN+	W 45–43	8,256
November 22	12:00 p.m.	at Yale	No. 8	Yale Bowl; New Haven, CT (rivalry)	ESPNU	L 28–45	52,497
November 29	12:00 p.m.	at No. 9 Villanova*	No. 15	Villanova Stadium; Villanova, PA (NCAA Division I First Round)	ESPN+	L 7–52	2,125
*Non-conference game; Rankings from STATS Poll released prior to the game; All times are in Eastern time

== Rankings ==
Ranking movements Legend: ██ Increase in ranking ██ Decrease in ranking RV = Received votes
	Week														
Poll	Pre	1	2	3	4	5	6	7	8	9	10	11	12	13	Final
STATS	RV	RV	RV	RV	RV	25	22	18	14	12	9	7	8	15	20
Coaches	RV	RV	RV	RV	RV	RV	25	20	17	15	13	11	10	19	23

== Preseason ==
=== Preseason poll ===
On August 4, Ivy League announced the preseason poll. Crimson were selected to finish in the first position.

== Game summaries ==
=== at Stetson ===
Harvard Crimson (0–0) at Stetson Hatters (1–2) – Game summary

Quarter	1	2	3	4	Total
Crimson	28	17	7	7	59
Hatters	0	0	7	0	7

at Spec Martin Stadium, DeLand, FL

- Date: September 20
- Game time: 1:00 PM EDT
- Game weather: Cloudy • Temperature: 87 °F (31 °C) • Wind: NE at 11 miles per hour (18 km/h)
- Game attendance: 2,710
- Referee: Drew Myers
- TV announcers (ESPN+): Tom James (play-by-play) and Davion Belk (analyst)

Game information

First quarter

- (11:56) HARV – Xaviah Bascon 11-yard run, Dylan Fingersh kick (Drive: 6 plays, 45 yards, 3:04; Harvard 7-0)
- (4:33) HARV – Isaiah Bullock 1-yard run, Dylan Fingersh kick (Drive: 2 plays, 7 yards, 0:43; Harvard 14-0)
- (2:56) HARV – Ryan Tattersall 69-yard pass from Jaden Craig, Dylan Fingersh kick (Drive: 1 play, 69 yards, 0:10; Harvard 21-0)
- (1:04) HARV – Isaiah Bullock 3-yard run, Dylan Fingersh kick (Drive: 4 plays, 7 yards, 1:34; Harvard 28-0)

Second quarter

- (9:30) HARV – Maddux Reid 2-yard run, Dylan Fingersh kick (Drive: 9 plays, 55 yards, 4:46; Harvard 35-0)
- (6:01) HARV – Dylan Fingersh 29-yard field goal (Drive: 5 plays, 28 yards, 2:10; Harvard 38-0)
- (1:54) HARV – Dean Boyd 29-yard pass from Jaden Craig, Dylan Fingersh kick (Drive: 2 plays, 45 yards, 0:12; Harvard 45-0)

Third quarter

- (8:12) HARV – Michael Dempsey 30-yard pass from Kael Alexander, Daniel Holbrook kick (Drive: 12 plays, 75 yards, 6:48; Harvard 45-7)
- (0:17) HARV – Dante Torres 5-yard run, Dylan Fingersh kick (Drive: 9 plays, 70 yards, 4:28; Harvard 52-7)

Fourth quarter

- (5:43) HARV – DJ Gordon 27-yard run, Dylan Fingersh kick (Drive: 5 plays, 68 yards, 2:55; Harvard 59-7)

Statistics	HARV	STET
First downs	20	11
Total yards	473	205
Rushing yards	192	56
Passing yards	281	149
Turnovers	2	3
Time of possession	30:17	29:43

Team	Category	Player	Statistics
Harvard	Passing	Jaden Craig	10/13, 208 yards, 2 TD
Harvard	Rushing	Jordan Harris	8 carries, 52 yards
Harvard	Receiving	Ryan Tattersall	2 receptions, 81 yards, TD
Stetson	Passing	Kael Alexander	11/20, 113 yards, TD
Stetson	Rushing	Zion Griffin	4 carries, 20 yards
Stetson	Receiving	Dalton Bailey	2 receptions, 32 yards

=== Brown ===
Brown Bears (1–0) at Harvard Crimson (1–0) – Game summary

Quarter	1	2	3	4	Total
Bears	7	0	0	0	7
Crimson	21	13	7	0	41

at Harvard Stadium, Boston, MA

- Date: September 27
- Game time: 6:00 p.m. EDT
- Game weather: Cloudy, 74 °F (23 °C)
- Game attendance: 16,283
- Referee: Bill McKeever
- TV announcers (ESPN+): Alex Vispoli (play-by-play), Tim Murphy (analyst) and Amanda Keane (sideline)

Game information

First quarter

- HARV – Dorsey Benefield 30-yard interception return (Kieran Corr kick), 14:52. Crimson 7–0.
- HARV – Dean Boyd 21-yard pass from Jaden Craig (Kieran Corr kick), 8:13. Crimson 14–0. Drive: 3 plays, 20 yards, 0:48.
- BRWN – Ty Pezza 4-yard pass from James Murphy (Drew Crabtree kick), 5:06. Crimson 14–7. Drive: 8 plays, 75 yards, 3:07.
- HARV – D. J. Gordon 1-yard run (Kieran Corr kick), 0:00. Crimson 21–7. Drive: 9 plays, 80 yards, 5:01.

Second quarter

- HARV – Seamus Gilmartin 16-yard pass from Jaden Craig (Kieran Corr kick), 5:47. Crimson 28–7. Drive: 13 plays, 90 yards, 7:12.
- HARV – Cam Henry 44-yard pass from Jaden Craig (kick failed), 1:51. Crimson 34–7. Drive: 5 plays, 73 yards, 2:29.

Third quarter

- HARV – Ryan Osborne 1-yard pass from Jaden Craig (Kieran Corr kick), 10:11. Crimson 41–7. Drive: 5 plays, 42 yards, 2:46.

Fourth quarter

No scoring plays

Statistics	BRWN	HARV
First downs	12	23
Total yards	155	479
Rushing yards	56	162
Passing yards	99	317
Turnovers	3	0
Time of possession	20:53	39:07

Team	Category	Player	Statistics
Brown	Passing	James Murphy	14/26, 99 yards, TD, 3 INT
Brown	Rushing	Matt Childs	12 rushes, 30 yards
Brown	Receiving	Michael Nesbit	2 receptions, 35 yards
Harvard	Passing	Jaden Craig	24/31, 317 yards, 4 TD
Harvard	Rushing	D. J. Gordon	16 rushes, 73 yards, TD
Harvard	Receiving	Cam Henry	3 receptions, 81 yards, TD

=== at Holy Cross ===
No. 25 Harvard Crimson (2–0) at Holy Cross Crusaders (0–5) – Game summary

Quarter	1	2	3	4	Total
No. 25 Crimson	21	17	21	0	59
Crusaders	0	3	7	14	24

at Fitton Field, Worcester, MA

- Date: October 4
- Game time: 2:00 p.m.
- Game weather: Sunny • Temperature: 78 °F (26 °C)
- Game attendance: 15,549
- Referee: Jeff Pumphrey
- TV announcers (ESPN+): Kevin Gehl (play-by-play) and Kevin Shea (analyst)

Game information

First quarter

- (9:34) HARV – Logan Resaka 22-yard pass from Jaden Craig, Kieran Corr kick (Drive: 1 play, 22 yards, 0:05; Harvard 7-0)
- (2:50) HARV – Isaiah Bullock 2-yard run, Kieran Corr kick (Drive: 5 plays, 42 yards, 2:22; Harvard 14-0)
- (0:43) HARV – Tafari Moe 8-yard pass from Jaden Craig, Kieran Corr kick (Drive: 2 plays, 27 yards, 0:40; Harvard 21-0)

Second quarter

- (8:32) HARV – Kieran Corr 22-yard field goal (Drive: 9 plays, 79 yards, 4:15; Harvard 24-0)
- (6:21) HC – Luis Palenzuela 34-yard field goal (Drive: 6 plays, 59 yards, 2:11; Harvard 24-3)
- (1:55) HARV – Xaviah Bascon 1-yard run, Kieran Corr kick (Drive: 9 plays, 79 yards, 4:21; Harvard 31-3)
- (0:05) HARV – Brady Blackburn 13-yard pass from Jaden Craig, Kieran Corr kick (Drive: 11 plays, 73 yards, 1:13; Harvard 38-3)

Third quarter

- (11:03) HARV – Brady Blackburn 33-yard pass from Dante Torres, Kieran Corr kick (Drive: 8 plays, 75 yards, 3:51; Harvard 45-3)
- (8:39) HC – Joseph Williams 44-yard pass from Cal Swanson, Luis Palenzuela kick (Drive: 5 plays, 83 yards, 2:20; Harvard 45-10)
- (8:27) HARV – Jordan Harris 75-yard run, Kieran Corr kick (Drive: 1 play, 75 yards, 0:12; Harvard 52-10)
- (5:41) HARV – Maddux Reid 2-yard run, Kieran Corr kick (Drive: 4 plays, 10 yards, 2:22; Harvard 59-10)

Fourth quarter

- (8:56) HC – Lincoln Fisher 15-yard pass from Cal Swanson, Luis Palenzuela kick (Drive: 7 plays, 45 yards, 2:42; Harvard 59-17)
- (5:32) HC – Alijah Cason 32-yard pass from Cal Swanson, Luis Palenzuela kick (Drive: 3 plays, 36 yards, 0:56; Harvard 59-24)

Statistics	HARV	HC
First downs	27	13
Total yards	528	333
Rushing yards	212	98
Passing yards	316	235
Turnovers	1	4
Time of possession	36:06	23:54

Team	Category	Player	Statistics
Harvard	Passing	Jaden Craig	19/27, 248 yards, 3 TD
Harvard	Rushing	Jordan Harris	4 carries, 91 yards, TD
Harvard	Receiving	Brady Blackburn	5 receptions, 114 yards, 2 TD
Holy Cross	Passing	Cal Swanson	14/33, 235 yards, 3 TD, 3 INT
Holy Cross	Rushing	Nyeoti Punni	6 carries, 73 yards
Holy Cross	Receiving	Alijah Cason	3 receptions, 57 yards, TD

=== Cornell ===
Cornell Big Red (0–3) at No. 22 Harvard Crimson (3–0) – Game summary

Quarter	1	2	3	4	Total
Big Red	0	0	7	3	10
No. 22 Crimson	7	7	3	17	34

at Harvard Stadium, Boston, MA

- Date: October 10
- Game time: 7:00 PM EDT
- Game weather: Clear • Temperature: 54 °F (12 °C) • Wind: SW 8 mph
- Game attendance: 6,644
- Referee: Cory Hanson
- TV announcers (ESPNU): Eric Frede (play-by-play) and Jack Ford (analyst)

Game information

First quarter

- (12:49) HARV – Austin-Jake Guillory 36-yard fumble recovery, Kieran Corr kick (Harvard 7–0)

Second quarter

- (8:17) HARV – Ben Alvarez 2-yard pass from Jaden Craig, Kieran Corr kick (Drive: 13 plays, 52 yards, 6:26; Harvard 14–0)

Third quarter

- (9:31) HARV – Kieran Corr 22-yard field goal (Drive: 11 plays, 76 yards, 5:25; Harvard 17–0)
- (4:55) COR – Garrett Bass-Sulpizio 1-yard run, Jonathan Roost kick (Drive: 9 plays, 64 yards, 4:28; Harvard 17–7)

Fourth quarter

- (14:56) COR – Jonathan Roost 25-yard field goal (Drive: 11 plays, 53 yards, 3:13; Harvard 17–10)
- (11:58) HARV – Kieran Corr 30-yard field goal (Drive: 8 plays, 62 yards, 2:58; Harvard 20–10)
- (5:07) HARV – Jaden Craig 4-yard run, Kieran Corr kick (Drive: 9 plays, 61 yards, 5:10; Harvard 27–10)
- (4:58) HARV – Jack Donahoe 39-yard interception, Kieran Corr kick (Harvard 34–10)

Statistics	COR	HARV
First downs	14	22
Total yards	193	413
Rushing yards	66	176
Passing yards	127	237
Turnovers	2	1
Time of possession	26:05	33:55

Team	Category	Player	Statistics
Cornell	Passing	Garrett Bass-Sulpizio	18/30, 127 yards, INT
Cornell	Rushing	Garrett Bass-Sulpizio	16 carries, 30 yards, TD
Cornell	Receiving	Johntu Reed	4 receptions, 45 yards
Harvard	Passing	Jaden Craig	21/37, 237 yards, TD, INT
Harvard	Rushing	Xaviah Bascon	23 carries, 94 yards
Harvard	Receiving	Brady Blackburn	5 receptions, 101 yards

=== Merrimack ===
Merrimack Warriors (3–4) at No. 18 Harvard Crimson (4–0) – Game summary

Quarter	1	2	3	4	Total
Warriors	0	7	0	0	7
No. 18 Crimson	7	6	11	7	31

at Harvard Stadium, Boston, MA

- Date: October 18
- Game time: 12:00 PM EDT
- Game weather: Sunny • Temperature: 58 °F (14 °C) • Wind: NW at 5 miles per hour (8.0 km/h)
- Game attendance: 5,661
- Referee: Alexander Randolph
- TV announcers (ESPN+): Alex Vispoli (play-by-play), Tim Murphy (analyst) and Amanda Keane (sideline)

Game information
First quarter
- (5:51) HARV – Ryan Osborne 14-yard pass from Jaden Craig, Kieran Corr kick (Drive: 10 plays, 88 yards, 5:16; Harvard 7–0)

Second quarter

- (9:14) HARV – Kieran Corr 27-yard field goal (Drive: 9 plays, 71 yards, 4:22; Harvard 10–0)
- (2:35) MRMK – Galamama Mulbah 20-yard run, Carlton Thai kick (Drive: 11 plays, 75 yards, 6:39; Harvard 10–7)
- (0:38) HARV – Kieran Corr 22-yard field goal (Drive: 8 plays, 70 yards, 1:57; Harvard 13–7)

Third quarter

- (6:48) HARV – DJ Gordon 24-yard run, Brady Blackburn pass (Drive: 3 plays, 38 yards, 0:52; Harvard 21–7)
- (1:56) HARV – Kieran Corr 21-yard field goal (Drive: 7 plays, 33 yards, 2:30; Harvard 24–7)

Fourth quarter

- (9:15) HARV – DJ Gordon 19-yard run, Kieran Corr kick (Drive: 6 plays, 81 yards, 2:45; Harvard 31–7)

Statistics	MRMK	HARV
First downs	20	25
Total yards	307	482
Rushing yards	189	177
Passing yards	118	305
Turnovers	1	1
Time of possession	31:59	28:01

Team	Category	Player	Statistics
Merrimack	Passing	Ayden Pereira	13/26, 118 yards, INT
Merrimack	Rushing	Ayden Pereira	20 carries, 73 yards
Merrimack	Receiving	Seth Sweitzer	2 receptions, 28 yards
Harvard	Passing	Jaden Craig	17/29, 305 yards, TD, INT
Harvard	Rushing	DJ Gordon	8 carries, 104 yards, 2 TD
Harvard	Receiving	Brady Blackburn	4 receptions, 110 yards

=== at Princeton ===
No. 14 Harvard Crimson (5–0) at Princeton Tigers (3–2) – Game summary

Quarter	1	2	3	4	Total
No. 14 Crimson	7	14	0	14	35
Tigers	7	7	0	0	14

at Princeton Stadium, Princeton, NJ

- Date: October 25
- Game time: 12:00 p.m. EDT
- Game weather: Sunny
- Game attendance: 9,137
- Referee: Jeremy DeAngulo
- TV announcers (ESPN+): Cody Chrusciel (play-by-play) and Dave Giancola (analyst)

Game information
First quarter
- (10:37) HARV – Cam Henry 69-yard pass from Jaden Craig, Kieran Corr kick (Drive: 2 plays, 88 yards, 0:45; Harvard 7-0)
- (1:27) PRIN – Aidan Besselman 17-yard pass from Kai Colón, Esteban Nunez Perez kick (Drive: 12 plays, 97 yards, 4:14; 7-7)

Second quarter

- (12:02) HARV – Kieran Corr 22-yard field goal (Drive: 10 plays, 71 yards, 4:20; Harvard 10-7)
- (3:50) PRIN – Ethan Clark 51-yard pass from Kai Colón, Esteban Nunez Perez kick (Drive: 2 plays, 54 yards, 0:44; Princeton 14-10)
- (1:05) HARV – Kieran Corr 25-yard field goal (Drive: 10 plays, 68 yards, 2:45; Princeton 14-13)
- (0:18) HARV – Xaviah Bascon 4-yard run, Jaden Craig pass to Jordan Harris for two-point conversion (Drive: 4 plays, 28 yards, 0:26; Harvard 21-14)

Third quarter

- No scoring plays

Fourth quarter

- (14:58) HARV – Isaiah Bullock 1-yard run, Kieran Corr kick (Drive: 17 plays, 71 yards, 9:02; Harvard 28-14)
- (9:04) HARV – DJ Gordon 9-yard run, Kieran Corr kick (Drive: 8 plays, 62 yards, 4:32; Harvard 35-14)

Statistics	HARV	PRIN
First downs	24	18
Total yards	475	340
Rushing yards	259	98
Passing yards	216	242
Turnovers	1	1
Time of possession	32:14	27:46

Team	Category	Player	Statistics
Harvard	Passing	Jaden Craig	16/29, 216 yards, TD, INT
Harvard	Rushing	Xaviah Bascon	13 carries, 101 yards, TD
Harvard	Receiving	Cam Henry	4 receptions, 79 yards, TD
Princeton	Passing	Kai Colón	19/31, 239 yards, 2 TD, INT
Princeton	Rushing	Ethan Clark	14 carries, 61 yards
Princeton	Receiving	Paul Kuhner	2 receptions, 65 yards

=== Dartmouth ===
Dartmouth Big Green (5–1) at No. 12 Harvard Crimson (6–0) – Game summary

Quarter	1	2	3	4	Total
Big Green	0	0	10	0	10
No. 12 Crimson	14	3	0	14	31

at Harvard Stadium, Boston, MA

- Date: November 1
- Game time: 3:00 PM EDT
- Game weather: Sunny • Temperature: 54 °F (12 °C) • Wind: W at 14 miles per hour (23 km/h)
- Game attendance: 11,334
- Referee: Todd Boyd
- TV announcers (ESPN+): Alex Vispoli (play-by-play), Tim Murphy (analyst) and Amanda Keane (sideline)

Game information
First quarter
- HARV - Seamus Gilmartin 14-yard pass from Jaden Craig (Kieran Corr kick), 9:19. Crimson 7-0. Drive: 13 plays, 71 yards, 5:36.
- HARV - Brady Blackburn 74-yard pass from Jaden Craig (Kieran Corr kick), 1:32. Crimson 14-0. Drive: 3 plays, 75 yards, 0:57.

Second quarter

- HARV - Kieran Corr 38-yard Field Goal, 8:33. Crimson 17-0. Drive: 12 plays, 75 yards, 6:27.

Third quarter

- DART - Grayson Saunier 1-yard run (Owen Zalc kick), 9:32. Crimson 17-7. Drive: 12 plays, 75 yards, 5:28.
- DART - Owen Zalc 46-yard Field Goal, 3:54. Crimson 17-10. Drive: 10 plays, 24 yards, 4:16.

Fourth quarter

- HARV - Logan Reaska 14-yard pass from Jaden Craig (Kieran Corr kick), 12:47. Crimson 24-10. Drive: 11 plays, 79 yards, 5:58.
- HARV - Seamus Gilmartin 34-yard pass from Jaden Craig (Kieran Corr kick), 11:17. Crimson 31-10. Drive: 1 play, 34 yards, 0:07.

Statistics	DART	HARV
First downs	15	23
Total yards	261	432
Rushing yards	61	110
Passing yards	200	322
Turnovers	0	2
Time of possession	26:11	33:49

Team	Category	Player	Statistics
Dartmouth	Passing	Grayson Saunier	18/32, 200 yards
Dartmouth	Rushing	D.J. Crowther	9 carries, 24 yards
Dartmouth	Receiving	Chris Corbo	3 receptions, 56 yards
Harvard	Passing	Jaden Craig	21/32, 322 yards, 4 TD, 2 INT
Harvard	Rushing	Xaviah Bascon	9 carries, 49 yards
Harvard	Receiving	Brady Blackburn	3 receptions, 116 yards, TD

=== at Columbia ===
No. 9 Harvard Crimson (7–0) at Columbia Lions (1–6) – Game summary

Quarter	1	2	3	4	Total
No. 9 Crimson	7	21	3	0	31
Lions	0	0	0	14	14

at Wien Stadium, New York City, NY

- Date: November 7
- Game time: 7:00 PM EST
- Game weather: Cloudy • Temperature: 57 °F (14 °C) • Wind: S 14 mph
- Game attendance: 3,644
- Referee: Todd Bowman
- TV announcers (ESPNU): Eric Frede (play-by-play) and Jack Ford (analyst)

Game information
First quarter
- (2:11) HARV – Xaviah Bascon 1-yard run, Kieran Corr kick (Drive: 10 plays, 80 yards, 5:10; Harvard 7–0)

Second quarter

- (9:00) HARV – Seamus Gilmartin 2-yard pass from Jaden Craig, Kieran Corr kick (Drive: 1 play, 2 yards, 0:05; Harvard 14–0)
- (3:55) HARV – Seamus Gilmartin 3-yard pass from Jaden Craig, Kieran Corr kick (Drive: 6 plays, 68 yards, 2:45; Harvard 21–0)
- (0:11) HARV – Xaviah Bascon 1-yard run, Kieran Corr kick (Drive: 12 plays, 64 yards, 2:47; Harvard 28–0)

Third quarter

- (6:07) HARV – Kieran Corr 22-yard field goal (Drive: 11 plays, 61 yards, 4:34; Harvard 31–0)

Fourth quarter

- (13:19) COLU – Titus Evans 15-yard pass from Chase Goodwin (Drive: 14 plays, 75 yards, 7:48; Harvard 31–6)
- (1:49) COLU – Titus Evans 6-yard pass from Chase Goodwin, Titus Evans pass (Drive: 5 plays, 45 yards, 1:05; Harvard 31–14)

Statistics	HARV	COLU
First downs	16	18
Total yards	381	325
Rushing yards	168	105
Passing yards	213	220
Turnovers	1	2
Time of possession	25:45	34:15

Team	Category	Player	Statistics
Harvard	Passing	Jaden Craig	16/24, 213 yards, 2 TD
Harvard	Rushing	Xaviah Bascon	18 carries, 94 yards, 2 TD
Harvard	Receiving	Cam Henry	5 receptions, 68 yards
Columbia	Passing	Chase Goodwin	20/38, 205 yards, 2 TD, 2 INT
Columbia	Rushing	Michael Walters	12 carries, 47 yards
Columbia	Receiving	Jordan Kelley	3 receptions, 43 yards

=== Penn ===
Penn Quakers (5–3) at No. 7 Harvard Crimson (8–0) – Game summary

Quarter	1	2	3	4	Total
Quakers	14	13	0	16	43
No. 7 Crimson	7	14	14	10	45

at Harvard Stadium, Boston, MA

- Date: November 15
- Game time: 12:00 p.m. EST
- Game weather: Sunny • Temperature: 45 °F (7 °C)
- Game attendance: 8,256
- Referee: Justin Ackley
- TV: ESPN+

Game information

First quarter

- (11:46) PENN – Donte West 1-yard run, Mason Walters kick (Drive: 5 plays, 83 yards, 2:20; Penn 7-0)
- (5:52) HARV – Xaviah Bascon 2-yard run, Kieran Corr kick (Drive: 13 plays, 75 yards, 5:54; 7-7)
- (1:39) PENN – Jared Richardson 26-yard pass from Liam O'Brien, Mason Walters kick (Drive: 9 plays, 75 yards, 4:13; Penn 14-7)

Second quarter

- (12:11) HARV – Xaviah Bascon 12-yard pass from Jaden Craig, Kieran Corr kick (Drive: 12 plays, 78 yards, 4:21; 14-14)
- (4:40) PENN – Donte West 1-yard run, Mason Walters kick (Drive: 13 plays, 77 yards, 7:24; Penn 21-14)
- (1:28) PENN – Jared Richardson 10-yard pass from Liam O'Brien, Mason Walters PAT blocked (Drive: 5 plays, 47 yards, 1:05; Penn 27-14)
- (0:02) HARV – Jaden Craig 2-yard run, Kieran Corr kick (Drive: 11 plays, 75 yards, 0:47; Penn 27-21)

Third quarter

- (5:36) HARV – Brady Blackburn 23-yard pass from Jaden Craig, Kieran Corr kick (Drive: 9 plays, 63 yards, 2:30; Harvard 28-27)
- (4:05) HARV – Ryan Osborne 82-yard pass from Jaden Craig, Kieran Corr kick (Drive: 2 plays, 72 yards, 0:32; Harvard 35-27)

Fourth quarter

- (14:21) PENN – Jared Richardson 7-yard pass from Liam O'Brien, two-point run conversion failed (Drive: 9 plays, 70 yards, 4:39; Harvard 35-33)
- (10:47) HARV – Xaviah Bascon 4-yard run, Kieran Corr kick (Drive: 9 plays, 41 yards, 3:34; Harvard 42-33)
- (3:45) PENN – Liam O'Brien 1-yard run, Mason Walters kick (Drive: 13 plays, 75 yards, 7:02; Harvard 42-40)
- (0:22) PENN – Mason Walters 30-yard field goal (Drive: 11 plays, 59 yards, 2:16; Penn 43-42)
- (0:05) HARV – Kieran Corr 53-yard field goal (Drive: 5 plays, 22 yards, 0:22; Harvard 45-43)

Statistics	PENN	HARV
First downs	33	30
Total yards	425	537
Rushing yards	154	147
Passing yards	271	390
Turnovers	0	0
Time of possession	33:46	26:14

Team	Category	Player	Statistics
Penn	Passing	Liam O'Brien	32/40, 271 yards, 3 TD
Penn	Rushing	Liam O'Brien	18 carries, 100 yards, TD
Penn	Receiving	Jared Richardson	10 receptions, 79 yards, 3 TD
Harvard	Passing	Jaden Craig	28/45, 390 yards, 3 TD
Harvard	Rushing	Xaviah Bascon	20 carries, 103 yards, 2 TD
Harvard	Receiving	Ryan Osborne	2 receptions, 90 yards, TD

=== at Yale ===
No. 8 Harvard Crimson (9–0) at Yale Bulldogs (7–2) – Game summary

Quarter	1	2	3	4	Total
No. 8 Crimson	0	14	6	8	28
Bulldogs	10	21	7	7	45

at Yale Bowl, New Haven, Connecticut

- Date: November 22
- Game time: 12:00 PM EST
- Game weather: Sunny
- Game attendance: 52,497
- Referee: Todd Boyd
- TV: ESPNU

Game information

First quarter

- YALE – Jaxton Santiago 21-yard pass from Dante Reno (Noah Piper kick), 14:42. Bulldogs 7–0. Drive: 1 play, 21 yards, 0:06.
- YALE – Noah Piper 40-yard field goal, 6:12. Bulldogs 10–0. Drive: 7 plays, 21 yards, 2:30.

Second quarter

- YALE – Josh Pitsenberger 8-yard run (Noah Piper kick), 13:02. Bulldogs 17–0. Drive: 12 plays, 79 yards, 6:11.
- HARV – Ryan Tattersall 23-yard pass from Jaden Craig (Kieran Corr kick), 13:02. Bulldogs 17–7. Drive: 11 plays, 75 yards, 4:03.
- YALE – Nico Brown 64-yard pass from Dante Reno (Noah Piper kick), 8:59. Bulldogs 24–7. Drive: 3 plays, 75 yards, 1:25.
- HARV – Jaden Craig 26-yard run (Kieran Corr kick), 4:19. Bulldogs 24–14. Drive: 9 plays, 75 yards, 3:15.
- YALE – Josh Pitsenberger 1-yard run (Noah Piper kick), 0:03. Bulldogs 31–14. Drive: 11 plays, 75 yards, 4:19.

Third quarter

- YALE – Josh Pitsenberger 4-yard run (Noah Piper kick), 8:55. Bulldogs 38–14. Drive: 11 plays, 75 yards, 6:05.
- HARV – Ryan Tattersall 9-yard pass from Jaden Craig (pass failed), 4:44. Bulldogs 38–20. Drive: 11 plays, 75 yards, 4:11.

Fourth quarter

- YALE – Lucius Anderson 12-yard pass from Dante Reno (Noah Piper kick), 15:00. Bulldogs 45–20. Drive: 4 plays, 81 yards, 1:36.
- HARV – Brady Blackburn 31-yard pass from Jaden Craig (Ryan Tattersall pass to Jaden Craig), 14:56. Bulldogs 45–28. Drive: 8 plays, 75 yards, 3:11.

Statistics	HARV	YALE
First downs	27	23
Total yards	412	445
Rushing yards	94	172
Passing yards	318	273
Turnovers	1	0
Time of possession	26:18	33:42

Team	Category	Player	Statistics
Harvard	Passing	Jaden Craig	23/43, 266 yards, 3 TD
Harvard	Rushing	Xaviah Bascon	9 rushes, 53 yards
Harvard	Receiving	Ryan Tattersall	5 receptions, 92 yards, 2 TD
Yale	Passing	Dante Reno	15/19, 273 yards, 3 TD
Yale	Rushing	Josh Pitsenberger	38 rushes, 143 yards, 3 TD
Yale	Receiving	Nico Brown	8 receptions, 189 yards, TD

=== at No. 9 Villanova (Division I First Round) ===
2025 NCAA Division I FCS Playoffs First Round
No. 15 Harvard Crimson (9–1) at No. 9 (12) Villanova Wildcats (9–2) – Game summary

Quarter	1	2	3	4	Total
No. 15 Crimson	0	0	7	0	7
No. 9 (12) Wildcats	14	17	7	14	52

at Villanova Stadium • Villanova, PA

- Date: November 29
- Game time: 12:00 p.m. EST
- Game weather: Sunny • Temperature: 40 °F (4 °C) • Wind: NW at 8 miles per hour (13 km/h)
- Game attendance: 2,125
- Referee: Jason Berg
- TV: ESPN+

Game information

First quarter

- VILL – Isaiah Ragland 45-yard run (Jack Barnum kick), 11:45. Wildcats 7–0. Drive: 7 plays, 75 yards, 3:15.
- VILL – Lucas Kopecky 30-yard pass from Pat McQuaide (Jack Barnum kick), 8:28. Wildcats 14–0. Drive: 10 plays, 80 yards, 5:02.

Second quarter

- VILL – Jack Barnum 29-yard field goal, 13:23. Wildcats 17–0. Drive: 10 plays, 49 yards, 3:57.
- VILL – Pat McQuaide 10-yard run (Jack Barnum kick), 7:52. Wildcats 24–0. Drive: 8 plays, 65 yards, 4:29.
- VILL – Ja'briel Mace 5-yard run (Jack Barnum kick), 2:00. Wildcats 31–0. Drive: 8 plays, 59 yards, 4:49.

Third quarter

- HARV – Jordan Harris 6-yard pass from Jaden Craig (Kieran Corr kick), 10:24. Wildcats 31–7. Drive: 10 plays, 68 yards, 4:30.
- VILL – Luke Colella 29-yard pass from Pat McQuaide (Jack Barnum kick), 8:17. Wildcats 38–7. Drive: 4 plays, 75 yards, 2:02.

Fourth quarter

- VILL – Antonio Johnson 8-yard pass from Pat McQuaide (Jack Barnum kick), 12:26. Wildcats 45–7. Drive: 5 plays, 39 yards, 2:56.
- VILL – Julian Glantz 5-yard run (Jack Barnum kick), 3:03. Wildcats 52–7. Drive: 6 plays, 31 yards, 3:39.

Statistics	HARV	VILL
First downs	14	26
Plays–yards	49–213	70–512
Rushes–yards	28–106	48–319
Passing yards	107	193
Passing: Comp–Att–Int	9–21–2	14–22–0
Turnovers	3	0
Time of possession	21:46	38:14

Team	Category	Player	Statistics
Harvard	Passing	Jaden Craig	9/21, 107 yards, TD, 2 INT
Harvard	Rushing	DJ Gordon	10 carries, 59 yards
Harvard	Receiving	Cam Henry	4 receptions, 47 yards
Villanova	Passing	Pat McQuaide	14/22, 193 yards, 3 TD
Villanova	Rushing	Isaiah Ragland	17 carries, 152 yards, TD
Villanova	Receiving	Braden Reed	5 receptions, 61 yards

== Personnel ==
=== 2025 recruiting class ===
College recruiting
Name	Hometown	School	Height	Weight	Commit date
Achilles Anderson; DL	Chicago, Illinois	Marist High School	6 ft 4 in (1.93 m)	255 lb (116 kg)	Jul 19, 2024
Achilles Anderson; DL	Recruit ratings: Rivals: 247Sports: ESPN: (NR)				
Ethan Carson; LB	Murfreesboro, Tennessee	Blackman High School	6 ft 1 in (1.85 m)	210 lb (95 kg)	Jun 7, 2024
Ethan Carson; LB	Recruit ratings: Rivals: 247Sports: ESPN: (NR)				
Mikey Young; ATH	Sandusky, Ohio	Perkins High School	6 ft 1 in (1.85 m)	205 lb (93 kg)	Jun 7, 2024
Mikey Young; ATH	Recruit ratings: Rivals: 247Sports: ESPN: (NR)				
Charlie Smith; QB	Charlotte, North Carolina	Charlotte Catholic High School	6 ft 2 in (1.88 m)	195 lb (88 kg)	May 2, 2024
Charlie Smith; QB	Recruit ratings: Rivals: 247Sports: ESPN: (NR)				
Reed Phillips; WR	Alexandria, Virginia	Episcopal High School	6 ft 3 in (1.91 m)	165 lb (75 kg)	Jul 4, 2024
Reed Phillips; WR	Recruit ratings: Rivals: 247Sports: ESPN: (NR)				
Teddy Chung; S	San Mateo, California	Junípero Serra High School	6 ft 0 in (1.83 m)	187 lb (85 kg)	May 29, 2024
Teddy Chung; S	Recruit ratings: Rivals: 247Sports: ESPN: (NR)				
Nicholas McCullough; Edge	Muskego, Wisconsin	Muskego High School	6 ft 3 in (1.91 m)	225 lb (102 kg)	May 17, 2024
Nicholas McCullough; Edge	Recruit ratings: Rivals: 247Sports: ESPN: (NR)				
Cole Allen; RB	Houston, Texas	St. John's School	5 ft 11 in (1.80 m)	200 lb (91 kg)	Aug 10, 2024
Cole Allen; RB	Recruit ratings: Rivals: 247Sports: ESPN: (NR)				
Ryan Tattersall; WR	Wilmington, Delaware	Wilmington Friends School	6 ft 5 in (1.96 m)	190 lb (86 kg)	Aug 2, 2024
Ryan Tattersall; WR	Recruit ratings: Rivals: 247Sports: ESPN: (NR)				
Jordan Gonzalez; LB	Wallingford, Connecticut	Choate Rosemary Hall	6 ft 2 in (1.88 m)	224 lb (102 kg)	Jul 1, 2024
Jordan Gonzalez; LB	Recruit ratings: Rivals: 247Sports: ESPN: (NR)				
Overall recruit ranking: 247Sports: 167
Note: In many cases, Scout, Rivals, 247Sports, On3, and ESPN may conflict in their listings of height and weight.; In these cases, the average was taken. ESPN grades are on a 100-point scale.; Sources: "Rivals commits". Rivals.; "ESPN commits". ESPN.; "2025 Team Ranking". Rivals.com.; "247Sports commits". 247Sports.

=== Roster ===
2025 Harvard Crimson football team roster
Players
Coaches
Offense

Pos.	#	Name	Class
RB	0	Xaviah Bascon	Jr
QB	1	Jaden Craig	Sr
WR	2	Dean Boyd	Sr
QB	3	Dante Torres	Jr
WR	4	Cam Henry	Sr
TE	5	Seamus Gilmartin	Jr
WR	6	Ryan Mooney	Jr
WR	8	Riley Jenne	Sr
QB	9	Ty Fein	So
WR	10	Will Krzysiak	Fr
WR	11	Isaiah Kacyvenski Jr.	Jr
QB	12	Sam Kaiser	So
WR	13	Reed Phillips	Fr
QB	14	Charlie Smith	Fr
WR	15	Cayden Coffman	Sr
WR	16	Tafari Moe	Fr
WR	17	Jordan Dotson	Sr
QB	18	DJ Gordon	So
WR	19	Brady Blackburn	So
RB	20	Jordan Harris	Jr
WR	21	Rohan Dalal	Fr
WR	22	Ryan Tattersall	Fr
RB	23	Cole Allen	Fr
RB	25	Kyle Johnson	Jr
RB	27	Isaiah Abbey	Sr
RB	28	Maddux Reid	So
RB	31	Mekhi Moore	Sr
TE	42	Logan Reaska	Jr
TE	45	Ben Alvarez	So
WR	47	Hugh Salva	Jr
OL	50	Alex Zakhem	Fr
OL	51	Brandon Sullivan	So
OL	52	Aidan Kilstorm	Sr
OL	53	Graham Roberts	Fr
OL	55	Derek Osman	Sr
OL	56	Logan Demchyk	So
OL	60	Nihaal Rana	So
OL	62	Derek Thompson	Jr
OL	65	Enzo Agostini	So
OL	66	Dominik Di Filippo	Jr
OL	67	Ian Cooper	Fr
OL	69	Ewan Newton	Fr
OL	71	Thomas O'Brien	Jr
OL	73	Madden Santiago	So
OL	75	Jackson Newville	Sr
OL	76	Max Bowman	Sr
OL	77	Spencer Doan	Jr
OL	78	Carter Daly	Sr
OL	79	Max Wang	So
WR	80	Camren Ware	So
TE	81	Henry Anthony	Fr
TE	84	Sanders Daniell	So
TE	85	Teigan Pelletier	Fr
TE	86	Ryan Osborne	Sr
WR	88	Luke Travaglini	So

Defense

Pos.	#	Name	Class
DB	0	Austin-Jake Guillory	Jr
S	1	Delian Bradley	Sr
DB	2	DJ Thomas	So
DB	3	Jack Donahoe	Jr
DB	4	John Chung	So
DB	7	Damien Henderson	Jr
DE	8	Josh Fedd	Jr
DB	9	Mekhi Hicks	Fr
LB	10	Mikey Young	Fr
DL	11	Levy Kinlock	Fr
DB	12	Teddy Chung	Fr
DB	15	Xaden Benson	So
DB	16	Jourdan Brissett	Fr
DB	18	Salim Hill	Fr
DB	19	Trey Thomas	So
S	21	Ty Bartrum	Sr
DB	23	Kennard McGuire Jr.	So
LB	24	Caleb Phillips	Jr
DB	25	Cristopher Ramirez	So
DB	26	Akiel Lomotey	Fr
LB	30	Owen Johnson	Jr
LB	34	Dorsey Benefield	So
LB	35	Sean Line	Jr
DB	36	Omari Gayles	So
LB	37	Conor Walsh	Jr
LB	38	Jaeden Kinlock	Sr
LB	39	Jordan Gonzalez	Fr
DL	40	Cam Walker	So
LB	43	Ethan Carson	Fr
LB	46	Jack Kirkwood	Sr
DL	57	Chris Gorman	So
DL	59	Jacinto Lopez	Jr
DL	64	Griffin Egan	So
DL	79	Alex DeGrieck	Sr
DL	83	Christian Nwosu	So
DE	87	Jack Crowley	Jr
DE	88	Stephen Scourtis	Jr
DL	90	Nick McCullough	Fr
DL	91	Conway Zhang	Jr
DL	94	JP Danaher	Fr
DL	96	Brandon Ukonu	Fr
DL	97	Achilles Anderson	Fr
DE	98	Jake Darling	Jr
DT	99	Xavier Agostino	Sr

Special teams

Pos.	#	Name	Class
P, K	29	Kieran Corr	So
LS	58	Jack Baade	Fr
LS	61	Jack Smith	Fr
K	82	Jonathan Rubin	Fr
P, K	92	Dylan Fingersh	So
P	95	Brian Checkley	Fr

Head coach

- Andrew Aurich

Coordinators/assistant coaches

- Scott Larkee
  Defensive coordinator/Linebackers
- Mickey Fein
  Offensive coordinator/Quarterbacks
- Ryan Crawford
  Defensive backs
- Steven Williams
  Special teams coordinator/wide receivers
- Jim Jackson
  Offensive line
- Logan Johnson
  Defensive line
- Drew Jacobs
  Safeties
- Cinjun Erskine
  Tight ends
- Kevin Falaki
  Running backs
- Joel Lamb
  Director of recruiting strategy and alumni engagement

Legend

- (C) Team captain
- (S) Suspended
- (I) Ineligible
- Injured
- Redshirt

Roster
Last update: September 7, 2026
