= 2026 Harvard Crimson football team =

American college football season

2026 Harvard Crimson football

Ivy League champion

FCS Playoffs
- Conference: Ivy League

Ranking
- STATS: No. 17
- FCS Coaches: No. 17
- Record: 8–2 (5–2 Ivy)
- Head coach: Andrew Aurich (3rd season)
- Offensive coordinator: Mickey Fein (6th season)
- Offensive scheme: Pro spread
- Defensive coordinator: Scott Larkee (17th season)
- Base defense: 4–3
- Home stadium: Harvard Stadium

2026 Ivy League football standings
	Conf.			Overall
Team	W		L	W		L
No. 17 Harvard $^	5	–	2	8	–	2
Yale	4	–	3	6	–	4
Princeton	4	–	3	6	–	4
Dartmouth	4	–	3	5	–	5
Brown	4	–	3	6	–	4
Penn	3	–	4	5	–	5
Columbia	2	–	5	5	–	5
Cornell	2	–	5	4	–	6
$ – Conference champion; ^ – FCS playoff participant; As of November 22, 2026; Rankings from STATS Poll

The 2026 Harvard Crimson football team represents Harvard University as a member of the Ivy League during the 2026 NCAA Division I FCS football season. The team will play its home games at Harvard Stadium in Boston and they will be led by third-year head coach Andrew Aurich.

== Schedule ==
Date	Time	Opponent	Rank	Site	TV	Result	Attendance
September 19	1:00 p.m.	at New Hampshire*	No. 25	Wildcat Stadium; Durham, NH	FloSports	W 31–7	5,169
September 25	7:00 p.m.	vs. Brown	No. 21	Centreville Bank Stadium; Pawtucket, RI	ESPN2	W 14–10	8,065
October 3	7:00 p.m.	No. 22 Colgate*	No. 20	Harvard Stadium; Boston, MA	ESPN+	W 20–17	9,100
October 10	1:00 p.m.	at Cornell	No. 18	Schoellkopf Stadium; Ithaca, NY	ESPN+	W 41–29	5,418
October 17	1:00 p.m.	Holy Cross*	No. 17	Harvard Stadium; Boston, MA	ESPN+	W 30–7	6,581
October 24	3:00 p.m.	Princeton	No. 15	Harvard Stadium; Boston, MA (rivalry)	ESPN+	W 35–7	14,896
October 30	7:00 p.m.	at Dartmouth	No. 13	Memorial Field; Hanover, NH (rivalry)	ESPNU	L 14–24	4,074
November 7	1:00 p.m.	Columbia	No. 19т	Harvard Stadium; Boston, MA	ESPN+	W 37–0	N/A
November 14	1:00 p.m.	at Penn	No. 19	Franklin Field; Philadelphia, PA (rivalry)	ESPN+	W 38–24	8,246
November 21	3:30 p.m.	vs. Yale	No. 17	Fenway Park; Boston, MA (rivalry)	ESPNU	L 17–20	32,104
*Non-conference game; Rankings from STATS Poll released prior to the game; All times are in Eastern time

== Rankings ==
Ranking movements Legend: ██ Increase in ranking ██ Decrease in ranking RV = Received votes т = Tied with team above or below
	Week														
Poll	Pre	1	2	3	4	5	6	7	8	9	10	11	12	13	Final
STATS	RV	RV	25	25	21	20	18	17	15	13	19т	19	17		
Coaches	RV	RV	RV	RV	25	22	19	17	17	16	22т	19	17		

== Game summaries ==
=== at New Hampshire ===
No. 25 Harvard Crimson (0–0) at New Hampshire Wildcats (1–2) – Game summary

Quarter	1	2	3	4	Total
No. 25 Crimson	0	21	0	10	31
Wildcats	0	7	0	0	7

at Wildcat Stadium • Durham, New Hampshire

- Date: September 19
- Game time: 1:00 p.m. EDT
- Game weather: Sunny • Temperature: 70 °F (21 °C)
- Game attendance: 5,169
- Referee: Eric Lewis
- TV announcers (FloSports): Calvin Christoforo and Ben Altsher
- Report: Official report

Game information
First quarter
- No scoring plays.

Second quarter

- HARV – Kise Flannery 1-yard run (Kieran Corr kick), 11:47. Crimson 7–0. Drive: 4 plays, 32 yards, 2:20.
- UNH – Brooks Bentley 1-yard run (Lucas Glassburn kick), 6:44. Tied 7–7. Drive: 11 plays, 75 yards, 5:03.
- HARV – Nathan Bailey 23-yard run (Kieran Corr kick), 0:53. Crimson 14–7. Drive: 9 plays, 71 yards, 2:05.
- HARV – Nathan Bailey 13-yard pass from Charlie Smith (Kieran Corr kick), 0:18. Crimson 21–7. Drive: 1 play, 13 yards, 0:05.

Third quarter

- No scoring plays.

Fourth quarter

- HARV – Kieran Corr 24-yard field goal, 11:39. Crimson 24–7. Drive: 13 plays, 84 yards, 7:09.
- HARV – Xaviah Bascon 1-yard run (Kieran Corr kick), 8:48. Crimson 31–7. Drive: 3 plays, 25 yards, 1:15.

Statistics	HARV	UNH
First downs	18	13
Plays–yards	65–262	75–235
Rushes–yards	44–188	38–49
Passing yards	74	186
Passing: comp–att–int	12–21–1	18–37–2
Turnovers	1	3
Time of possession	29:39	30:21

Team	Category	Player	Statistics
Harvard	Passing	Charlie Smith	11/19, 71 yards, TD, INT
Harvard	Rushing	Cole Allen	12 carries, 62 yards
Harvard	Receiving	Maddux Reid	1 reception, 22 yards
New Hampshire	Passing	Brooks Bentley	18/37, 186 yards, 2 INT
New Hampshire	Rushing	Joquez Smith	10 carries, 50 yards
New Hampshire	Receiving	Ty Carlson	3 receptions, 56 yards

=== vs. Brown ===
No. 21 Harvard Crimson (1–0) vs. Brown Bears (1–0) – Game summary

Quarter	1	2	3	4	Total
No. 21 Crimson	7	7	0	0	14
Bears	0	0	3	7	10

at Centreville Bank Stadium • Pawtucket, Rhode Island

- Date: September 25
- Game time: 7:00 p.m. EDT
- Game weather: Rain • Temperature: 59 °F (15 °C) • Wind: NE at 25 miles per hour (40 km/h)
- Game attendance: 8,065
- Referee: Alex Parrella
- TV announcers (ESPN2): Eric Frede and Jack Ford
- Report: Official report

Game information
First quarter
- HARV – Ryan Tattersall 5-yard pass from Charlie Smith (Kieran Corr kick), 5:07. Crimson 7–0. Drive: 8 plays, 48 yards, 3:16.

Second quarter

- HARV – Teigan Pelletier 4-yard pass from Charlie Smith (Kieran Corr kick), 3:44. Crimson 14–0. Drive: 15 plays, 86 yards, 6:57.

Third quarter

- BRWN – Drew Crabtree 48-yard field goal, 3:22. Crimson 14–3. Drive: 8 plays, 15 yards, 3:43.

Fourth quarter

- BRWN – Jackson Bennett 29-yard run (Drew Crabtree kick), 8:16. Crimson 14–10. Drive: 8 plays, 76 yards, 3:32.

Statistics	HARV	BRWN
First downs	21	13
Plays–yards	73–298	53–214
Rushes–yards	36–93	29–93
Passing yards	205	121
Passing: comp–att–int	30–37–1	18–24–3
Turnovers	2	4
Time of possession	36:10	23:50

Team	Category	Player	Statistics
Harvard	Passing	Charlie Smith	30/37, 205 yards, 2 TD, INT
Harvard	Rushing	Xaviah Bascon	15 carries, 45 yards
Harvard	Receiving	Nathan Bailey	9 receptions, 80 yards
Brown	Passing	James Murphy	18/24, 121 yards, 3 INT
Brown	Rushing	Matt Childs	11 carries, 57 yards
Brown	Receiving	Matt Childs	7 receptions, 59 yards

=== No. 22 Colgate ===
No. 22 Colgate Raiders (4–1) at No. 20 Harvard Crimson (2–0) – Game summary

Quarter	1	2	3	4	Total
No. 22 Raiders	0	7	0	10	17
No. 20 Crimson	7	0	0	13	20

at Harvard Stadium • Boston, Massachessets

- Date: October 3
- Game time: 7:00 p.m. EDT
- Game weather: Sunny • Wind: E at 7 miles per hour (11 km/h)
- Game attendance: 9,100
- Referee: Jeff Pumphrey
- TV: ESPN+
- Report: Official report

Game information
First quarter
- HARV – Teigan Pelletier 6-yard pass from Charlie Smith (Francisco Moscoso kick), 5:48. Crimson 7–0. Drive: 5 plays, 55 yards, 1:53.

Second quarter

- COLG – Caleb Naumann 1-yard run (Luke Vogeler kick), 12:36. Tied 7–7. Drive: 8 plays, 41 yards, 3:47.

Third quarter

- No scoring plays.

Fourth quarter

- COLG – Luke Vogeler 24-yard field goal, 7:10. Raiders 10–7. Drive: 12 plays, 61 yards, 6:00.
- HARV – Seamus Gilmartin 2-yard pass from Charlie Smith (Francisco Moscoso kick), 2:08. Crimson 14–10. Drive: 10 plays, 78 yards, 4:57.
- COLG – Matt Fogler 13-yard pass from Jake Stearney (Luke Vogeler kick), 0:27. Raiders 17–14. Drive: 13 plays, 75 yards, 1:36.
- HARV – Nathan Bailey 8-yard pass from Charlie Smith, 0:00. Crimson 20–17. Drive: 6 plays, 75 yards, 0:27.

Statistics	COLG	HARV
First downs	21	27
Plays–yards	68–326	75–468
Rushes–yards	30–138	30–93
Passing yards	188	375
Passing: comp–att–int	21–38–1	31–45–1
Turnovers	1	1
Time of possession	29:15	30:45

Team	Category	Player	Statistics
Colgate	Passing	Jake Stearney	21/38, 188 yards, TD, INT
Colgate	Rushing	Caleb Naumann	18 carries, 87 yards, TD
Colgate	Receiving	Matt Fogler	12 receptions, 138 yards, TD
Harvard	Passing	Charlie Smith	31/45, 375 yards, 3 TD, INT
Harvard	Rushing	Xaviah Bascon	10 carries, 51 yards
Harvard	Receiving	Nathan Bailey	16 receptions, 187 yards, TD

=== at Cornell ===
No. 18 Harvard Crimson (3–0) at Cornell Big Red (2–1) – Game summary

Quarter	1	2	3	4	Total
No. 18 Crimson	0	21	17	3	41
Big Red	10	0	0	19	29

at Schoellkopf Field • Ithaca, New York

- Date: October 10
- Game time: 1:00 p.m. EDT
- Game weather: Sunny • Temperature: 68 °F (20 °C) • Wind: SE at 8 miles per hour (13 km/h)
- Game attendance: 5,418
- Referee: Anthony Florio
- TV announcers (ESPN+): Nick DeLuca and Matt Miller
- Report: Official report

Game information
First quarter
- COR – Alan Zhao 43-yard field goal, 9:18. Big Red 3–0. Drive: 13 plays, 49 yards, 5:42.
- COR – Garrett Bass-Sulpizio 2-yard run (Alan Zhao kick), 3:54. Big Red 10–0. Drive: 11 plays, 76 yards, 5:15.

Second quarter

- HARV – Kise Flannery 1-yard run (Kieran Corr kick), 14:22. Big Red 10–7. Drive: 10 plays, 75 yards, 4:32.
- HARV – Tafari Moe 36-yard pass from Charlie Smith (Kieran Corr kick), 8:32. Crimson 14–10. Drive: 7 plays, 85 yards, 3:31.
- HARV – Henry Shoemaker 16-yard pass from Charlie Smith (Kieran Corr kick), 1:08. Crimson 21–10. Drive: 8 plays, 71 yards, 3:00.

Third quarter

- HARV – Xaviah Bascon 4-yard run (Kieran Corr kick), 11:05. Crimson 28–10. Drive: 8 plays, 70 yards, 3:55.
- HARV – Kieran Corr 51-yard field goal, 8:25. Crimson 31–10. Drive: 4 plays, 0 yards, 1:29.
- HARV – Teigan Pelletier 28-yard pass from Charlie Smith (Kieran Corr kick), 6:24. Crimson 38–10. Drive: 2 plays, 30 yards, 0:39.

Fourth quarter

- HARV – Kieran Corr 27-yard field goal, 12:19. Crimson 41–10. Drive: 15 plays, 77 yards, 7:39.
- COR – Ean Pope 61-yard run (Alan Zhao kick), 10:16. Crimson 41–17. Drive: 4 plays, 75 yards, 2:03.
- COR – Samuel Musungu 3-yard pass from Garrett Bass-Sulpizio, 5:45. Crimson 41–23. Drive: 14 plays, 52 yards, 4:30.
- COR – JaVon Broussard 21-yard pass from Garrett Bass-Sulpizio, 1:55. Crimson 41–29. Drive: 10 plays, 73 yards, 2:39.

Statistics	HARV	COR
First downs	24	24
Plays–yards	62–380	78–398
Rushes–yards	35–105	40–240
Passing yards	275	158
Passing: comp–att–int	23–27–1	20–38–2
Turnovers	1	2
Time of possession	28:38	31:22

Team	Category	Player	Statistics
Harvard	Passing	Charlie Smith	23/27, 275 yards, 3 TD, INT
Harvard	Rushing	Xaviah Bascon	12 carries, 59 yards, TD
Harvard	Receiving	Nathan Bailey	7 receptions, 64 yards
Cornell	Passing	Garrett Bass-Sulpizio	20/38, 158 yards, 2 TD, 2 INT
Cornell	Rushing	Ean Pope	7 carries, 91 yards, TD
Cornell	Receiving	JaVon Broussard	4 receptions, 46 yards, TD

=== Holy Cross ===
Holy Cross Crusaders (2–4) at No. 17 Harvard Crimson (4–0) – Game summary

Quarter	1	2	3	4	Total
Crusaders	0	7	0	0	7
No. 17 Crimson	7	6	10	7	30

at Harvard Stadium • Boston, Massachusetts

- Date: October 17
- Game time: 1:00 p.m. EDT
- Game weather: Cloudy • Temperature: 58 °F (14 °C) • Wind: NW at 13 miles per hour (21 km/h)
- Game attendance: 6,581
- Referee: Terry Jones
- TV announcers (ESPN+): Alex Vispoli, Tim Murphy and Gabby Sartori
- Report: Official report

Game information
First quarter
- HARV – Kise Flannery 1-yard run (Kieran Corr kick), 7:54. Crimson 7–0. Drive: 9 plays, 72 yards, 4:46.

Second quarter

- HARV – Kieran Corr 37-yard field goal, 11:43. Crimson 10–0. Drive: 13 plays, 61 yards, 5:36.
- HC – Joseph Williams 51-yard pass from Jake Croce (Owen Saraceno kick), 9:32. Crimson 10–7. Drive: 4 plays, 73 yards, 2:07.
- HARV – Kieran Corr 37-yard field goal, 0:03. Crimson 13–7. Drive: 11 plays, 64 yards, 3:08.

Third quarter

- HARV – Kieran Corr 42-yard field goal, 2:20. Crimson 16–7. Drive: 9 plays, 65 yards, 4:05.
- HARV – Henry Shoemaker 67-yard pass from Charlie Smith (Kieran Corr kick), 0:00. Crimson 23–7. Drive: 1 play, 67 yards, 0:08.

Fourth quarter

- HARV – Kise Flannery 10-yard run (Kieran Corr kick), 4:37. Crimson 30–7. Drive: 12 plays, 84 yards, 6:07.

Statistics	HC	HARV
First downs	13	24
Plays–yards	52–311	71–461
Rushes–yards	29–140	39–164
Passing yards	171	297
Passing: comp–att–int	12–23–2	19–32–0
Turnovers	2	1
Time of possession	27:48	32:12

Team	Category	Player	Statistics
Holy Cross	Passing	David Lynch	11/22, 120 yards, 2 INT
Holy Cross	Rushing	Joseph Williams	16 carries, 123 yards
Holy Cross	Receiving	Joseph Williams	4 receptions, 87 yards, TD
Harvard	Passing	Charlie Smith	19/32, 297 yards, TD
Harvard	Rushing	Najee Calhoun	13 carries, 43 yards
Harvard	Receiving	Henry Shoemaker	3 receptions, 83 yards, TD

=== Princeton (rivalry) ===
Princeton Tigers (4–1) at No. 15 Harvard Crimson (5–0) – Game summary

Quarter	1	2	3	4	Total
Tigers	0	0	7	0	7
No. 15 Crimson	3	10	8	14	35

at Harvard Stadium • Boston, Massachusetts

- Date: October 24
- Game time: 3:00 p.m. EDT
- Game weather: Sunny • Temperature: 59 °F (15 °C)
- Game attendance: 14,896
- Referee: Tom Zetts
- TV: ESPN+
- Report: Official report

Game information
First quarter
- HARV – Kieran Corr 24-yard field goal, 2:51. Crimson 3–0. Drive: 18 plays, 74 yards, 10:02.

Second quarter

- HARV – Henry Shoemaker 26-yard pass from Charlie Smith (Kieran Corr kick), 10:48. Crimson 10–0. Drive: 3 plays, 69 yards, 1:22.
- HARV – Kieran Corr 32-yard field goal, 2:09. Crimson 13–0. Drive: 14 plays, 61 yards, 6:12.

Third quarter

- HARV – Teigan Pelletier 18-yard pass from Kise Flannery (Kise Flannery–Nathan Bailey pass), 10:25. Crimson 21–0. Drive: 9 plays, 75 yards, 4:30.
- PRIN – Aidan Besselman 8-yard pass from Wyatt Becker (Esteban Nunez Perez kick), 1:02. Crimson 21–7. Drive: 20 plays, 75 yards, 9:23.

Fourth quarter

- HARV – Tafari Moe 18-yard pass from Charlie Smith (Kieran Corr kick), 12:50. Crimson 28–7. Drive: 7 plays, 75 yards, 3:12.
- HARV – Dorsey Benefield 32-yard fumble recovery (Kieran Corr kick), 10:49. Crimson 35–7.

Statistics	PRIN	HARV
First downs	19	24
Plays–yards	63–219	62–391
Rushes–yards	35–92	31–128
Passing yards	127	263
Passing: comp–att–int	20–28–1	25–31–0
Turnovers	2	0
Time of possession	27:05	32:55

Team	Category	Player	Statistics
Princeton	Passing	Ty Ciongoli	9/14, 73 yards, INT
Princeton	Rushing	Kai Honda	18 carries, 60 yards
Princeton	Receiving	Josh Smith	3 receptions, 37 yards
Harvard	Passing	Charlie Smith	22/28, 230 yards, 2 TD
Harvard	Rushing	DJ Gordon	9 carries, 67 yards
Harvard	Receiving	Tafari Moe	3 receptions, 53 yards, TD

=== at Dartmouth (rivalry) ===
No. 13 Harvard Crimson (6–0) at Dartmouth Big Green (3–3) – Game summary

Quarter	1	2	3	4	Total
No. 13 Crimson	0	14	0	0	14
Big Green	7	14	0	3	24

at Memorial Field • Hanover, New Hampshire

- Date: October 30
- Game time: 7:00 p.m. EDT
- Game weather: Cloudy • Temperature: 50 °F (10 °C)
- Game attendance: 4,074
- Referee: Jeremy DeAngulo
- TV announcers (ESPNU): Eric Frede and Jack Ford
- Report: Official report

Game information
First quarter
- DART – Grayson Saunier 1-yard run (Owen Zalc kick), 9:33. Big Green 7–0. Drive: 6 plays, 18 yards, 2:52.

Second quarter

- DART – Dylan Elder 2-yard pass from Grayson Saunier (Owen Zalc kick), 10:50. Big Green 14–0. Drive: 11 plays, 61 yards, 5:16.
- HARV – Nathan Bailey 13-yard pass from Charlie Smith (Kieran Corr kick), 6:41. Big Green 14–7. Drive: 2 plays, 35 yards, 0:22.
- DART – Nick Lemon 9-yard pass from Grayson Saunier (Owen Zalc kick), 1:44. Big Green 21–7. Drive: 11 plays, 75 yards, 4:57.
- HARV – Ryan Tattersall 38-yard pass from Charlie Smith (Kieran Corr kick), 1:02. Big Green 21–14. Drive: 4 plays, 75 yards, 0:42.

Third quarter

- No scoring plays.

Fourth quarter

- DART – Owen Zalc 30-yard field goal, 4:22. Big Green 24–14. Drive: 14 plays, 59 yards, 7:17.

Statistics	HARV	DART
First downs	26	18
Plays–yards	66–404	68–271
Rushes–yards	29–127	56–229
Passing yards	277	42
Passing: comp–att–int	23–37–5	5–12–3
Turnovers	5	3
Time of possession	25:48	34:12

Team	Category	Player	Statistics
Harvard	Passing	Charlie Smith	23/37, 277 yards, 2 TD, 5 INT
Harvard	Rushing	DJ Gordon	14 carries, 77 yards
Harvard	Receiving	Ryan Tattersall	6 receptions, 94 yards, TD
Dartmouth	Passing	Grayson Saunier	5/12, 42 yards, 2 TD, 3 INT
Dartmouth	Rushing	Grayson Saunier	20 carries, 109 yards, TD
Dartmouth	Receiving	Nick Lemon	2 receptions, 30 yards, TD

=== Columbia ===
Columbia Lions (4–3) at No. 19т Harvard Crimson (6–1) – Game summary

Quarter	1	2	3	4	Total
Lions	0	0	0	0	0
No. 19т Crimson	16	21	0	0	37

at Harvard Stadium • Boston, Massachessets

- Date: November 7
- Game time: 1:00 p.m. EST
- Game weather: Sunny
- Referee: Cory Hanson
- TV announcers (ESPN+): Alex Vispoli, Tim Murphy and Gabby Sartori
- Report: Official report

Game information
First quarter
- HARV – Ryan Tattersall 43-yard pass from Charlie Smith (Kieran Corr kick), 7:02. Crimson 7–0. Drive: 7 plays, 95 yards, 2:31.
- HARV – 0-yard safety, 5:52. Crimson 9–0.
- HARV – Kise Flannery 1-yard run (Kieran Corr kick), 0:06. Crimson 16–0. Drive: 12 plays, 67 yards, 5:41.

Second quarter

- HARV – DJ Gordon 35-yard run (Kieran Corr kick), 12:52. Crimson 23–0. Drive: 5 plays, 45 yards, 2:01.
- HARV – Logan Reaska 8-yard pass from Charlie Smith (Kieran Corr kick), 4:05. Crimson 30–0. Drive: 9 plays, 93 yards, 5:31.
- HARV – DJ Gordon 7-yard run (Kieran Corr kick), 1:31. Crimson 37–0. Drive: 3 plays, 55 yards, 0:20.

Third quarter

- No scoring plays

Fourth quarter

- No scoring plays

Statistics	COLU	HARV
First downs	17	21
Plays–yards	71–261	61–434
Rushes–yards	47–206	37–222
Passing yards	55	212
Passing: comp–att–int	9–24–1	14–24–1
Turnovers	2	1
Time of possession	30:31	29:29

Team	Category	Player	Statistics
Columbia	Passing	Chase Goodwin	9/23, 55 yards, INT
Columbia	Rushing	Brody McLaughlin	15 carries, 62 yards
Columbia	Receiving	Hutch Crow	2 receptions, 18 yards
Harvard	Passing	Charlie Smith	12/20, 184 yards, 2 TD, INT
Harvard	Rushing	DJ Gordon	14 carries, 150 yards, 2 TD
Harvard	Receiving	Nathan Bailey	5 receptions, 70 yards

=== at Penn (rivalry) ===
No. 19 Harvard Crimson (7–1) at Penn Quakers (4–4) – Game summary

Quarter	1	2	3	4	Total
No. 19 Crimson	10	7	7	14	38
Quakers	0	24	0	0	24

at Franklin Field • Philadelphia, Pennsylvania

- Date: November 14
- Game time: 1:00 p.m. EST
- Game weather: Sunny • Temperature: 46 °F (8 °C) • Wind: E at 11 miles per hour (18 km/h)
- Game attendance: 8,246
- Referee: Antonio Marcella
- TV announcers (ESPN+): Jon Gross, Joe Valerio and Jack Miller
- Report: Official report

Game information

First quarter

- HARV – Cole Allen 22-yard pass from Charlie Smith (Kieran Corr kick), 11:58. Crimson 7–0. Drive: 8 plays, 78 yards, 2:47.
- HARV – Kieran Corr 40-yard field goal, 0:55. Crimson 10–0. Drive: 17 plays, 60 yards, 8:14.

Second quarter

- PENN – Mason Walters 23-yard field goal, 10:51. Crimson 10–3. Drive: 11 plays, 70 yards, 5:04.
- HARV – Nathan Bailey 14-yard pass from Charlie Smith (Kieran Corr kick), 5:17. Crimson 17–3. Drive: 10 plays, 74 yards, 5:29.
- PENN – Ronan Johannson 69-yard pass from Karson Siqueiros-Lasky (Mason Walters kick), 3:34. Crimson 17–10. Drive: 3 plays, 75 yards, 1:43.
- PENN – Ben Wable 0-yard punt return (Mason Walters kick), 1:08. Tied 17–17.
- PENN – Zach Darche 37-yard interception (Mason Walters kick), 0:53. Quakers 24–17.

Third quarter

- HARV – Nathan Bailey 34-yard pass from Charlie Smith (Kieran Corr kick), 6:55. Tied 24–24. Drive: 1 play, 34 yards, 0:07.

Fourth quarter

- HARV – Xaviah Bascon 5-yard run (Kieran Corr kick), 12:17. Crimson 31–24. Drive: 6 plays, 34 yards, 3:31.
- HARV – Kise Flannery 2-yard run (Kieran Corr kick), 4:25. Crimson 38–24. Drive: 10 plays, 77 yards, 6:12.

Statistics	HARV	PENN
First downs	22	15
Plays–yards	70–374	55–287
Rushes–yards	42–175	24–48
Passing yards	199	239
Passing: comp–att–int	18–28–1	19–31–0
Turnovers	1	1
Time of possession	33:51	26:09

Team	Category	Player	Statistics
Harvard	Passing	Charlie Smith	18/28, 199 yards, 3 TD, INT
Harvard	Rushing	Xaviah Bascon	18 carries, 104 yards, TD
Harvard	Receiving	Nathan Bailey	13 receptions, 113 yards, 2 TD
Penn	Passing	Karson Siqueiros-Lasky	15/23, 210 yards, TD
Penn	Rushing	Sean Williams Jr.	13 carries, 42 yards
Penn	Receiving	Ronan Johannson	2 receptions, 69 yards, TD

=== vs. Yale (The Game) ===
Yale Bulldogs (5–4) vs. No. 17 Harvard Crimson (8–1) – Game summary

Quarter	1	2	3	4	Total
Bulldogs	0	0	0	0	0
No. 17 Crimson	0	0	0	0	0

at Fenway Park • Boston, Massachusetts

- Date: November 21
- Game time: 3:30 p.m. EST
- TV: ESPNU

Statistics	YALE	HARV
First downs		
Plays–yards		
Rushes–yards		
Passing yards		
Passing: comp–att–int		
Turnovers		
Time of possession		

Team	Category	Player	Statistics
Yale	Passing		
Yale	Rushing		
Yale	Receiving		
Harvard	Passing		
Harvard	Rushing		
Harvard	Receiving		

== Roster ==
2026 Harvard Crimson football team roster
Players
Coaches
Offense

Pos.	#	Name	Class
RB	0	Xaviah Bascon	Sr
QB	2	Jonah Williamson	Fr
QB	3	Dante Torres	Sr
WR	4	Judge Nash	Fr
TE	5	Seamus Gilmartin	Sr
QB	9	Ty Fein	Jr
WR	10	Will Krzysiak	So
WR	11	Isaiah Kacyvenski Jr.	Sr
QB	12	Sam Kaiser	Jr
WR	13	Reed Phillips	So
QB	14	Charlie Smith	So
QB	15	Kise Flannery	Fr
WR	16	Tafari Moe	So
WR	17	Nate Bailey	Fr
QB	18	DJ Gordon	Jr
WR	19	Brady Blackburn	Jr
RB	20	Jordan Harris	Sr
WR	21	Rohan Dalal	So
WR	22	Ryan Tattersall	So
RB	23	Cole Allen	So
RB	25	Kyle Johnson	Sr
RB	27	Najee Calhoun	Fr
RB	28	Maddux Reid	Jr
RB	38	Will Martin	Fr
TE	42	Logan Reaska	Sr
TE	43	Micah Jones	Fr
TE	45	Ben Alvarez	Jr
WR	47	Hugh Salva	Sr
OL	50	Alex Zakhem	So
OL	52	Nate Turk	Fr
OL	53	Graham Roberts	So
OL	54	Brandon Sullivan	Jr
OL	55	Zach Olson	Fr
OL	56	Logan Demchyk	Jr
OL	60	Nihaal Rana	Jr
OL	62	Derek Thompson	Sr
OL	65	Enzo Agostini	Jr
OL	66	Dominik Di Filippo	Sr
OL	67	Ian Cooper	So
OL	70	Rowan Ahrens	Fr
OL	71	Thomas O'Brien	Sr
OL	72	Myles Batesky	Fr
OL	77	Spencer Doan	Sr
OL	78	Madden Santiago	Jr
OL	79	Max Wang	Jr
WR	80	Camren Ware	Jr
TE	81	Henry Anthony	So
TE	82	Colin Laurence	Fr
WR	83	Henry Shoemaker	Fr
TE	84	Sanders Daniell	Jr
TE	85	Teigan Pelletier	So
WR	88	Luke Travaglini	Jr

Defense

Pos.	#	Name	Class
DB	0	Austin-Jake Guillory	Sr
LB	1	Ethan Carson	So
DB	2	DJ Thomas	Jr
DB	3	Jack Donahoe	Sr
DB	4	John Chung	Jr
DB	7	Damien Henderson	Sr
DE	8	Josh Fedd	Sr
DB	9	Mekhi Hicks	So
LB	10	Mikey Young	So
DL	11	Levy Kinlock	So
DB	12	Teddy Chung	So
DB	13	Jack Kelly	Fr
DB	14	Labeed Zaib	Fr
DB	15	Xaden Benson	Jr
DB	16	Jourdan Brissett	So
DB	17	Chase Mason	Fr
DB	18	Salim Hill	So
DB	19	Trey Thomas	Jr
DB	21	Gio Joseph	Fr
DB	22	Iroc Cordova	Fr
DB	23	Kennard McGuire Jr.	Jr
LB	24	Caleb Phillips	Sr
DB	26	Akiel Lomotey	So
DB	27	AJ Lopez	Sr
DB	28	Austin Olivas	Fr
LB	30	Owen Johnson	Sr
DB	31	Luke Rogers	Fr
LB	34	Dorsey Benefield	Jr
LB	35	Sean Line	Sr
DB	36	Omari Gayles	Jr
LB	37	Conor Walsh	Sr
LB	39	Jordan Gonzalez	So
DL	40	Cam Walker	Jr
LB	41	Bryan Harrison	Fr
DL	44	Oakley Foster	Fr
LB	47	Jack Tuenge	Fr
DL	54	Jovan Chase	Fr
DL	55	Brock Heisler	Fr
DL	59	Jacinto Lopez	Sr
DL	64	Griffin Egan	Jr
DE	87	Jack Crowley	Sr
DE	88	Stephen Scourtis	Sr
DL	89	David Owusu	Fr
DL	90	Nick McCullough	So
DL	91	Conway Zhang	Sr
DL	93	Mikhal Johnson	Fr
DL	94	JP Danaher	So
DL	96	Brandon Ukonu	So
DL	97	Achilles Anderson	So
DE	98	Jake Darling	Sr
DL	99	Chris Gorman	Jr

Special teams

Pos.	#	Name	Class
P, K	25	Dylan Fingersh	Jr
P, K	29	Kieran Corr	Jr
LS	58	Jack Baade	So
LS	61	Jack Smith	So
K	82	Jonathan Rubin	So
K	92	Francisco Moscoso	Fr
P	95	Brian Checkley	So

Head coach

- Andrew Aurich

Coordinators/assistant coaches

- Scott Larkee
  Defensive coordinator/Linebackers
- Mickey Fein
  Offensive coordinator/Quarterbacks
- Ryan Crawford
  Defensive backs
- Steven Williams
  Special teams coordinator/wide receivers
- Jim Jackson
  Offensive line
- Logan Johnson
  Defensive line
- Cinjun Erskine
  Tight ends
- Kevin Falaki
  Running backs
- Paul Amakihe
  Linebackers
- Joel Lamb
  Director of recruiting strategy and alumni engagement

Legend

- (C) Team captain
- (S) Suspended
- (I) Ineligible
- Injured
- Redshirt

Roster
Last update: September 7, 2026
