= 2026 Brown Bears football team =

American college football season

2026 Brown Bears football
- Conference: Ivy League
- Record: 6−4 (4–3 Ivy)
- Head coach: James Perry (7th season)
- Offensive scheme: Air raid
- Defensive coordinator: Dan Mulrooney (2nd season)
- Base defense: 4–3
- Captain: Danny Thompson; Ike Odimegwu; James Murphy; Max Malo Tommy; Tommy Dunn
- Home stadium: Richard Gouse Field at Brown Stadium

2026 Ivy League football standings
	Conf.			Overall
Team	W		L	W		L
No. 17 Harvard +^	5	–	1	8	–	1
Princeton	4	–	2	6	–	3
Brown	4	–	2	6	–	3
Yale	3	–	3	5	–	4
Dartmouth	3	–	3	4	–	5
Penn	2	–	4	4	–	5
Cornell	2	–	4	4	–	5
Columbia	1	–	5	4	–	5
+ – Conference co-champions; ^ – FCS playoff participant; As of November 22, 2026; Rankings from STATS Poll

The 2026 Brown Bears football team will represent Brown University as a member of the Ivy League during the 2026 NCAA Division I FCS football season. The Bears will be led by seventh-year head coach James Perry and play their home games at Richard Gouse Field at Brown Stadium in Providence, Rhode Island.

== Schedule ==
Date	Time	Opponent	Site	TV	Result	Attendance
September 19	12:00 p.m.	at New Haven*	Ralph F. DellaCamera Stadium; West Haven, CT	SI TV/NEC Front Row	W 17–10	7,200
September 25	7:00 p.m.	vs. No. 21 Harvard	Centreville Bank Stadium; Pawtucket, RI	ESPN2	L 10–14	8,065
October 3	12:00 p.m.	at Rhode Island*	Centreville Bank Stadium; Pawtucket, RI (rivalry)	WLNE-TV/FloSports	L 10–13	5,368
October 10	12:00 p.m.	Bryant*	Richard Gouse Field at Brown Stadium; Providence, RI	ESPN+/NESN+	W 28–13	2,531
October 17	12:00 p.m.	at Princeton	Princeton Stadium; Princeton, NJ	NBCSP/ESPN+	L 10–16	3,944
October 24	12:00 p.m.	Cornell	Richard Gouse Field at Brown Stadium; Providence, RI	ESPN+	W 38–31 ^{OT}	5,605
October 31	12:00 p.m.	Penn	Richard Gouse Field at Brown Stadium; Providence, RI	ESPN+	W 36–17	4,183
November 7	12:00 p.m.	at Yale	Yale Bowl; New Haven, CT	ESPN+	W 24–20	4,273
November 14	12:00 p.m.	Columbia	Richard Gouse Field at Brown Stadium; Providence, RI	ESPN+/NESN	W 28–20	3,008
November 21	1:00 p.m.	at Dartmouth	Memorial Field; Hanover, NH	ESPN+	L 7–17	3,418
*Non-conference game; Rankings from STATS Poll released prior to the game; All times are in Eastern time; Source:

== Game summaries ==
=== at New Haven ===
Brown Bears (0–0) at New Haven Chargers (1–2) – Game summary

Quarter	1	2	3	4	Total
Bears	7	10	0	0	17
Chargers	0	0	3	7	10

at Ralph F. DellaCamera Stadium • West Haven, Connecticut

- Date: September 19
- Game time: 12:00 p.m. EDT
- Game weather: Sunny
- Game attendance: 7,200
- Referee: Michael Davis
- TV: SI TV/NEC Front Row
- Report: Official report

Game information
First quarter
- BRWN – Matt Childs 3-yard run (Drew Crabtree kick), 8:58. Bears 7–0. Drive: 3 plays, 90 yards, 1:06.

Second quarter

- BRWN – Matt Childs 3-yard run (Drew Crabtree kick), 11:33. Bears 14–0. Drive: 10 plays, 53 yards, 4:24.
- BRWN – Drew Crabtree 29-yard field goal, 0:02. Bears 17–0. Drive: 12 plays, 78 yards, 1:52.

Third quarter

- NH – Liam Quigley 25-yard field goal, 1:17. Bears 17–3. Drive: 13 plays, 41 yards, 6:23.

Fourth quarter

- NH – Dom Grguric 5-yard pass from AJ Duffy, 9:49. Bears 17–10. Drive: 10 plays, 79 yards, 3:47.

Statistics	BRWN	NH
First downs	23	17
Plays–yards	72–422	74–278
Rushes–yards	33–79	27–63
Passing yards	343	215
Passing: comp–att–int	26–39–2	27–47–1
Turnovers	3	1
Time of possession	27:54	32:06

Team	Category	Player	Statistics
Brown	Passing	James Murphy	26/38, 343 yards, 2 INT
Brown	Rushing	Matt Childs	14 carries, 53 yards, 2 TD
Brown	Receiving	Matt Childs	3 receptions, 95 yards
New Haven	Passing	AJ Duffy	27/47, 215 yards, TD, INT
New Haven	Rushing	Zaon Laney	13 carries, 37 yards
New Haven	Receiving	Dom Grguric	6 receptions, 55 yards, TD

=== vs. No. 21 Harvard ===
No. 21 Harvard Crimson (1–0) vs. Brown Bears (1–0) – Game summary

Quarter	1	2	3	4	Total
No. 21 Crimson	7	7	0	0	14
Bears	0	0	3	7	10

at Centreville Bank Stadium • Pawtucket, Rhode Island

- Date: September 25
- Game time: 7:00 p.m. EDT
- Game weather: Rain • Temperature: 59 °F (15 °C) • Wind: NE at 25 miles per hour (40 km/h)
- Game attendance: 8,065
- Referee: Alex Parrella
- TV announcers (ESPN2): Eric Frede (play-by-play) and Jack Ford (analyst)
- Report: Official report

Game information
First quarter
- HARV – Ryan Tattersall 5-yard pass from Charlie Smith (Kieran Corr kick), 5:07. Crimson 7–0. Drive: 8 plays, 48 yards, 3:16.

Second quarter

- HARV – Teigan Pelletier 4-yard pass from Charlie Smith (Kieran Corr kick), 3:44. Crimson 14–0. Drive: 15 plays, 86 yards, 6:57.

Third quarter

- BRWN – Drew Crabtree 48-yard field goal, 3:22. Crimson 14–3. Drive: 8 plays, 15 yards, 3:43.

Fourth quarter

- BRWN – Jackson Bennett 29-yard run (Drew Crabtree kick), 8:16. Crimson 14–10. Drive: 8 plays, 76 yards, 3:32.

Statistics	HARV	BRWN
First downs	21	13
Plays–yards	73–298	53–214
Rushes–yards	36–93	29–93
Passing yards	205	121
Passing: comp–att–int	30–37–1	18–24–3
Turnovers	2	4
Time of possession	36:10	23:50

Team	Category	Player	Statistics
Harvard	Passing	Charlie Smith	30/37, 205 yards, 2 TD, INT
Harvard	Rushing	Xaviah Bascon	15 carries, 45 yards
Harvard	Receiving	Nathan Bailey	9 receptions, 80 yards
Brown	Passing	James Murphy	18/24, 121 yards, 3 INT
Brown	Rushing	Matt Childs	11 carries, 57 yards
Brown	Receiving	Matt Childs	7 receptions, 59 yards

=== at Rhode Island (rivalry) ===
Brown Bears (1–1) at Rhode Island Rams (2–3) – Game summary

Quarter	1	2	3	4	Total
Bears	0	0	3	7	10
Rams	0	3	0	10	13

at Centreville Bank Stadium • Pawtucket, Rhode Island

- Date: October 3
- Game time: 12:00 p.m. EDT
- Game weather: Sunny
- Game attendance: 5,368
- Referee: Bill McKeever
- TV: WLNE-TV/FloSports
- Report: Official report

Game information
First quarter
- No scoring plays.

Second quarter

- URI – Ty Groff 43-yard field goal, 0:18. Rams 3–0. Drive: 8 plays, 52 yards, 2:16.

Third quarter

- BRWN – Drew Crabtree 33-yard field goal, 3:11. Tied 3–3. Drive: 14 plays, 78 yards, 5:07.

Fourth quarter

- BRWN – Qwentin Brown 1-yard run (Drew Crabtree kick), 13:29. Bears 10–3. Drive: 5 plays, 13 yards, 1:33.
- URI – Alex McClelland 12-yard run (Ty Groff kick), 12:05. Tied 10–10. Drive: 3 plays, 82 yards, 1:24.
- URI – Ty Groff 43-yard field goal, 0:11. Rams 13–10. Drive: 5 plays, 20 yards, 0:21.

Statistics	BRWN	URI
First downs	14	19
Plays–yards	63–306	76–374
Rushes–yards	26–35	50–217
Passing yards	271	157
Passing: comp–att–int	21–37–1	16–26–1
Turnovers	1	3
Time of possession	26:21	33:39

Team	Category	Player	Statistics
Brown	Passing	James Murphy	21/37, 271 yards, INT
Brown	Rushing	Matt Childs	13 carries, 37 yards
Brown	Receiving	Jadon Garza-Pender	3 receptions, 66 yards
Rhode Island	Passing	Alex McClelland	6/11, 83 yards
Rhode Island	Rushing	Gabe Winowich	23 carries, 85 yards
Rhode Island	Receiving	Marquis Buchanan	5 receptions, 90 yards

=== Bryant ===
Bryant Bulldogs (4–1) at Brown Bears (1–2) – Game summary

Quarter	1	2	3	4	Total
Bulldogs	0	7	6	0	13
Bears	7	14	0	7	28

at Brown Stadium • Providence, Rhode Island

- Date: October 10
- Game time: 12:00 p.m. EDT
- Game weather: Sunny • Temperature: 66 °F (19 °C) • Wind: NW at 10 miles per hour (16 km/h)
- Game attendance: 2,531
- Referee: Justin Ackley
- TV announcers (ESPN+/NESN+): Scott Cordischi (play-by-play), John Anderson (analyst) and Nick Coit (sideline)
- Report: Official report

Game information
First quarter
- BRWN – Matt Childs 9-yard run (Drew Crabtree kick), 8:20. Bears 7–0. Drive: 6 plays, 55 yards, 2:55.

Second quarter

- BRWN – Qwentin Brown 1-yard run (Drew Crabtree kick), 12:16. Bears 14–0. Drive: 10 plays, 91 yards, 4:16.
- BRWN – Qwentin Brown 1-yard run (Drew Crabtree kick), 5:37. Bears 21–0. Drive: 8 plays, 79 yards, 3:41.
- BRY – Shamar Fowles 35-yard pass from Brennan Myer (Nicholas Stoyanovich kick), 3:36. Bears 21–7. Drive: 5 plays, 60 yards, 1:53.

Third quarter

- BRY – Nicholas Stoyanovich 31-yard field goal, 8:07. Bears 21–10. Drive: 15 plays, 56 yards, 6:50.
- BRY – Nicholas Stoyanovich 22-yard field goal, 1:09. Bears 21–13. Drive: 15 plays, 74 yards, 5:36.

Fourth quarter

- BRWN – Matt Childs 1-yard run (Drew Crabtree kick), 9:42. Bears 28–13. Drive: 14 plays, 70 yards, 6:23.

Statistics	BRY	BRWN
First downs	22	21
Plays–yards	72–408	70–383
Rushes–yards	34–100	45–185
Passing yards	308	198
Passing: comp–att–int	29–38–1	16–25–1
Turnovers	1	1
Time of possession	30:59	27:53

Team	Category	Player	Statistics
Bryant	Passing	Brennan Myer	29/38, 308 yards, TD, INT
Bryant	Rushing	OJ Ross	6 carries, 39 yards
Bryant	Receiving	Shamar Fowles	12 receptions, 135 yards, TD
Brown	Passing	James Murphy	16/25, 198 yards, INT
Brown	Rushing	Matt Childs	18 carries, 103 yards, 2 TD
Brown	Receiving	Pearson Hill	3 receptions, 56 yards

=== at Princeton ===
Brown Bears (2–2) at Princeton Tigers (3–1) – Game summary

Quarter	1	2	3	4	Total
Bears	0	0	3	7	10
Tigers	10	6	0	0	16

at Princeton Stadium • Princeton, New Jersey

- Date: October 17
- Game time: 12:00 p.m. EDT
- Game weather: Cloudy • Temperature: 49 °F (9 °C) • Wind: S at 14 miles per hour (23 km/h)
- Game attendance: 3,944
- Referee: Henry Wimberg
- TV: NBCSP/ESPN+
- Report: Official report

Game information
First quarter
- PRIN – Paul Kuhner 29-yard pass from Wyatt Becker (Esteban Nunez Perez kick), 13:20. Tigers 7–0. Drive: 4 plays, 75 yards, 1:36.
- PRIN – Esteban Nunez Perez 34-yard field goal, 7:24. Tigers 10–0. Drive: 12 plays, 50 yards, 4:55.

Second quarter

- PRIN – Esteban Nunez Perez 25-yard field goal, 10:15. Tigers 13–0. Drive: 11 plays, 59 yards, 4:01.
- PRIN – Esteban Nunez Perez 38-yard field goal, 1:55. Tigers 16–0. Drive: 13 plays, 36 yards, 5:09.

Third quarter

- BRWN – Drew Crabtree 21-yard field goal, 2:53. Tigers 16–3. Drive: 19 plays, 88 yards, 7:06.

Fourth quarter

- BRWN – Levi Linowes 2-yard pass from Matt Childs (Drew Crabtree kick), 1:05. Tigers 16–10. Drive: 12 plays, 92 yards, 3:08.

Statistics	BRWN	PRIN
First downs	24	20
Plays–yards	84–350	72–372
Rushes–yards	27–44	38–117
Passing yards	306	255
Passing: comp–att–int	34–57–0	20–34–1
Turnovers	2	1
Time of possession	29:20	30:40

Team	Category	Player	Statistics
Brown	Passing	James Murphy	33/56, 304 yards
Brown	Rushing	Matt Childs	12 carries, 29 yards
Brown	Receiving	Matt Childs	8 receptions, 82 yards
Princeton	Passing	Wyatt Becker	8/15, 128 yards, TD
Princeton	Rushing	Kai Honda	28 carries, 84 yards
Princeton	Receiving	Jackson Green	4 receptions, 79 yards

=== Cornell ===
Cornell Big Red (3–2) at Brown Bears (2–3) – Game summary

Quarter	1	2	3	4	OT	Total
Big Red	0	21	10	0	0	31
Bears	7	3	7	14	7	38

at Brown Stadium • Providence, Rhode Island

- Date: October 24
- Game time: 12:00 p.m. EDT
- Game weather: Sunny • Temperature: 62 °F (17 °C) • Wind: NE at 10 miles per hour (16 km/h)
- Game attendance: 5,605
- Referee: Terry Jones
- TV announcers (ESPN+): Scott Cordischi (play-by-play), John Anderson (analyst) and Jorge Bannister (sideline)
- Report: Official report

Game information
First quarter
- BRWN – Pearson Hill 31-yard pass from James Murphy (Drew Crabtree kick), 3:39. Bears 7–0. Drive: 13 plays, 70 yards, 6:01.

Second quarter

- COR – Garrett Bass-Sulpizio 5-yard run (Alan Zhao kick), 13:42. Tied 7–7. Drive: 11 plays, 85 yards, 4:52.
- COR – Garrett Bass-Sulpizio 12-yard run (Alan Zhao kick), 7:33. Big Red 14–7. Drive: 4 plays, 35 yards, 1:31.
- COR – Garrett Bass-Sulpizio 1-yard run (Alan Zhao kick), 5:23. Big Red 21–7. Drive: 5 plays, 34 yards, 2:01.
- BRWN – Drew Crabtree 28-yard field goal, 0:25. Big Red 21–10. Drive: 8 plays, 63 yards, 1:28.

Third quarter

- COR – Caden Lesiewicz 27-yard field goal, 9:57. Big Red 24–10. Drive: 6 plays, 30 yards, 2:12.
- BRWN – Matt Childs 6-yard run (Drew Crabtree kick), 5:53. Big Red 24–17. Drive: 3 plays, 18 yards, 1:07.
- COR – Brendan Lee 12-yard pass from Garrett Bass-Sulpizio (Alan Zhao kick), 3:09. Big Red 31–17. Drive: 7 plays, 75 yards, 2:44.

Fourth quarter

- BRWN – Saphir Miller 50-yard pass from James Murphy (Drew Crabtree kick), 13:48. Big Red 31–24. Drive: 7 plays, 99 yards, 2:42.
- BRWN – Matt Childs 9-yard pass from James Murphy (Drew Crabtree kick), 0:00. Tied 31–31. Drive: 18 plays, 84 yards, 4:25.

Overtime

- BRWN – Matt Childs 25-yard run (Drew Crabtree kick). Bears 38–31. Drive: 1 play, 25 yards, 0:00.

Statistics	COR	BRWN
First downs	22	28
Plays–yards	74–405	87–463
Rushes–yards	32–128	37–138
Passing yards	277	325
Passing: comp–att–int	25–42–2	31–50–2
Turnovers	2	4
Time of possession	30:05	29:55

Team	Category	Player	Statistics
Cornell	Passing	Garrett Bass-Sulpizio	25/42, 277 yards, TD, 2 INT
Cornell	Rushing	Brendan Lee	5 carries, 47 yards
Cornell	Receiving	Xavier Bowman	8 receptions, 69 yards
Brown	Passing	James Murphy	31/50, 325 yards, 3 TD, 2 INT
Brown	Rushing	Matt Childs	17 carries, 72 yards, 2 TD
Brown	Receiving	Matt Childs	10 receptions, 85 yards, TD

=== Penn ===
Penn Quakers (3–3) at Brown Bears (3–3) – Game summary

Quarter	1	2	3	4	Total
Quakers	0	3	0	14	17
Bears	10	7	3	16	36

at Brown Stadium • Providence, Rhode Island

- Date: October 31
- Game time: 12:00 p.m. EDT
- Game weather: Sunny • Temperature: 56 °F (13 °C) • Wind: NW at 10 miles per hour (16 km/h)
- Game attendance: 4,183
- Referee: Alexander Randolph
- TV announcers (ESPN+): Scott Cordischi (play-by-play), John Color (analyst) and Nick Coit (sideline)
- Report: Official report

Game information
First quarter
- BRWN – Drew Crabtree 40-yard field goal, 10:24. Bears 3–0. Drive: 8 plays, 26 yards, 2:56.
- BRWN – Matt Childs 1-yard run (Drew Crabtree kick), 3:44. Bears 10–0. Drive: 10 plays, 51 yards, 4:04.

Second quarter

- BRWN – Carson Hill 15-yard pass from James Murphy (Drew Crabtree kick), 11:31. Bears 17–0. Drive: 10 plays, 57 yards, 4:43.
- PENN – Mason Walters 53-yard field goal, 0:24. Bears 17–3. Drive: 7 plays, 10 yards, 0:50.

Third quarter

- BRWN – Drew Crabtree 24-yard field goal, 5:02. Bears 20–3. Drive: 16 plays, 80 yards, 7:41.

Fourth quarter

- PENN – Isaac Lee 3-yard pass from Karson Siqueiros-Lasky (Mason Walters kick), 12:57. Bears 20–10. Drive: 10 plays, 74 yards, 3:08.
- BRWN – Drew Crabtree 31-yard field goal, 5:14. Bears 23–10. Drive: 12 plays, 62 yards, 7:43.
- BRWN – Jackson Bennett 18-yard run, 3:13. Bears 29–10. Drive: 3 plays, 29 yards, 1:05.
- PENN – Mason Page 20-yard pass from Karson Siqueiros-Lasky (Mason Walters kick), 0:49. Bears 29–17. Drive: 11 plays, 62 yards, 2:19.
- BRWN – Max Malo 45-yard kickoff return (Drew Crabtree kick), 0:43. Bears 36–17.

Statistics	PENN	BRWN
First downs	14	19
Plays–yards	70–298	75–380
Rushes–yards	23–56	49–148
Passing yards	242	232
Passing: comp–att–int	25–47–1	16–26–1
Turnovers	2	2
Time of possession	24:49	35:11

Team	Category	Player	Statistics
Penn	Passing	Karson Siqueiros-Lasky	18/26, 193 yards, 2 TD, INT
Penn	Rushing	Miles Teodecki	6 carries, 31 yards
Penn	Receiving	Isaac Lee	7 receptions, 76 yards, TD
Brown	Passing	James Murphy	15/25, 230 yards, TD, INT
Brown	Rushing	Matt Childs	21 carries, 75 yards, TD
Brown	Receiving	Jadon Garza-Pender	4 receptions, 48 yards

=== at Yale ===
Brown Bears (4–3) at Yale Bulldogs (4–3) – Game summary

Quarter	1	2	3	4	Total
Bears	7	10	0	7	24
Bulldogs	7	7	6	0	20

at Yale Bowl • New Haven, Connecticut

- Date: November 7
- Game time: 12:00 p.m. EST
- Game weather: Cloudy • Temperature: 64 °F (18 °C) • Wind: NW at 6 miles per hour (9.7 km/h)
- Game attendance: 4,273
- Referee: Eric Lewis
- TV: ESPN+
- Report: Official report

Game information
First quarter
- YALE – Jaxton Santiago 3-yard pass from Dante Reno (Noah Piper kick), 8:59. Bulldogs 7–0. Drive: 15 plays, 75 yards, 6:01.
- BRWN – Najih Rahman 16-yard pass from James Murphy (Drew Crabtree kick), 1:02. Tied 7–7. Drive: 7 plays, 86 yards, 3:11.

Second quarter

- YALE – Billy Eastep 49-yard interception return (Noah Piper kick), 8:16. Bulldogs 14–7.
- BRWN – Trevor Foley 73-yard pass from James Murphy (Drew Crabtree kick), 7:29. Tied 14–14. Drive: 2 plays, 75 yards, 0:47.
- BRWN – Drew Crabtree 35-yard field goal, 1:40. Bears 17–14. Drive: 11 plays, 72 yards, 2:48.

Third quarter

- YALE – Noah Piper 41-yard field goal, 8:07. Tied 17–17. Drive: 12 plays, 43 yards, 5:07.
- YALE – Noah Piper 44-yard field goal, 0:10. Bulldogs 20–17. Drive: 14 plays, 23 yards, 6:42.

Fourth quarter

- BRWN – Pearson Hill 16-yard pass from James Murphy (Drew Crabtree kick), 11:31. Bears 24–20. Drive: 9 plays, 75 yards, 3:39.

Statistics	BRWN	YALE
First downs	16	22
Plays–yards	55–326	87–321
Rushes–yards	27–53	47–135
Passing yards	53	135
Passing: comp–att–int	22–28–1	25–40–0
Turnovers	1	0
Time of possession	24:10	35:50

Team	Category	Player	Statistics
Brown	Passing	James Murphy	22/28, 273 yards, 3 TD, INT
Brown	Rushing	Qwentin Brown	5 carries, 30 yards
Brown	Receiving	Trevor Foley	2 receptions, 114 yards, TD
Yale	Passing	Dante Reno	25/39, 186 yards, TD
Yale	Rushing	Hugo Djeumeni Kemeni	28 carries, 124 yards
Yale	Receiving	Jaxton Santiago	8 receptions, 64 yards, TD

=== Columbia ===
Columbia Lions (4–4) at Brown Bears (5–3) – Game summary

Quarter	1	2	3	4	Total
Lions	7	3	7	3	20
Bears	0	21	0	7	28

at Brown Stadium • Providence, Rhode Island

- Date: November 14
- Game time: 12:00 p.m. EST
- Game attendance: 3,008
- TV: ESPN+/NESN
- Report: Official report

Game information
First quarter
- COLU – Brody McLaughlin 1-yard run (Hugo Merry kick), 2:41. Lions 7–0. Drive: 15 plays, 76 yards, 7:42.

Second quarter

- COLU – Hugo Merry 30-yard field goal, 7:16. Lions 10–0. Drive: 13 plays, 59 yards, 7:44.
- BRWN – Matt Childs 1-yard run (Drew Crabtree kick), 5:34. Lions 10–7. Drive: 5 plays, 75 yards, 1:42.
- BRWN – Matt Childs 4-yard run (Drew Crabtree kick), 4:17. Bears 14–10. Drive: 6 plays, 25 yards, 1:11.
- BRWN – Matt Childs 1-yard run (Drew Crabtree kick), 0:58. Bears 21–10. Drive: 5 plays, 78 yards, 1:23.

Third quarter

- COLU – Hutch Crow 7-yard pass from Chase Goodwin (Hugo Merry kick), 3:49. Bears 21–17. Drive: 15 plays, 80 yards, 9:06.

Fourth quarter

- BRWN – Matt Childs 7-yard run (Drew Crabtree kick), 8:59. Bears 28–17. Drive: 8 plays, 80 yards, 3:41.
- COLU – Hugo Merry 32-yard field goal, 1:14. Bears 28–20. Drive: 16 plays, 84 yards, 3:34.

Statistics	COLU	BRWN
First downs	30	14
Plays–yards	89–412	49–309
Rushes–yards	42–132	29–134
Passing yards	280	175
Passing: comp–att–int	32–47–0	9–20–0
Turnovers	1	0
Time of possession	42:10	17:50

Team	Category	Player	Statistics
Columbia	Passing	Chase Goodwin	32/47, 280 yards, TD
Columbia	Rushing	Brody McLaughlin	20 carries, 82 yards, TD
Columbia	Receiving	Hutch Crow	12 receptions, 98 yards, TD
Brown	Passing	James Murphy	9/20, 175 yards
Brown	Rushing	Matt Childs	11 carries, 66 yards, 4 TD
Brown	Receiving	Levi Linowes	3 receptions, 64 yards

=== at Dartmouth ===
Brown Bears (6–3) at Dartmouth Big Green (4–5) – Game summary

Quarter	1	2	3	4	Total
Bears	0	0	0	0	0
Big Green	0	0	0	0	0

at Memorial Stadium • Hanover, New Hampshire

- Date: November 21
- Game time: 1:00 p.m. EST
- TV: ESPN+

Game information

First quarter
Second quarter
Third quarter
Fourth quarter

Statistics	BRWN	DART
First downs		
Plays–yards		
Rushes–yards		
Passing yards		
Passing: comp–att–int		
Turnovers		
Time of possession		

Team	Category	Player	Statistics
Brown	Passing		
Brown	Rushing		
Brown	Receiving		
Dartmouth	Passing		
Dartmouth	Rushing		
Dartmouth	Receiving		

== Personnel ==
=== Roster ===
2026 Brown Bears football team roster
Players
Coaches
Offense

Pos.	#	Name	Class
RB	1	Qwentin Brown	5th
RB	2	Matt Childs	Jr
RB	3	Jackson Bennett	Sr
WR	4	Najih Rahman	Sr
WR	8	Kyai Cook	Sr
QB	9	Nolan Lazor	Jr
QB	12	Brady Dever	Sr
WR	14	Michael Nesbit	Sr
QB	15	James Murphy (C)	Sr
WR	16	Pearson Hill	Jr
QB	17	Messiah Jackson	Fr
QB	18	Will Currid	Jr
WR	19	Carson Hill	So
RB	21	Elijah Jones	So
RB	22	Michael McGhee	Sr
RB	30	Desmond Ortiz	Fr
RB	32	Tyrone Neal	Fr
RB	38	Colby Isabelle	Sr
WR	41	Nico D'Orazio	Fr
WR	47	Cole Cavanaugh	Fr
OL	52	Marcus Sukkar	Jr
OL	60	Eddie Battista	So
OL	61	Billy Wheless	Jr
OL	63	Colin Overy	Fr
OL	64	Charlie Pe'a-Shropshire	Sr
OL	65	Mark Banbury	Jr
OL	66	Seamus Henry	Fr
OL	68	Flynn Malgieri	Fr
OL	69	Sam Brackney	So
OL	70	Jack Harrison	Fr
OL	72	Aiden Smith	So
OL	73	Caleb Yates	Jr
OL	74	Charlie Pietrosante	Sr
OL	75	Beau Smith	Jr
OL	77	Joey Pietrosante	Jr
OL	78	John Green	So
OL	79	Danny Thompson (C)	Sr
WR	80	Saphir Miller	Fr
WR	81	Tayden Ferguson	So
TE	82	Benjamin Taylor	Sr
WR	83	Vincent Shen	So
WR	84	Trevor Foley	Jr
TE	85	Henry Hurd	So
TE	86	Levi Linowes	Sr
TE	87	Pierce Leverett	Sr
TE	88	Jadon Garza-Pender	Jr
WR	89	Xavier Hazard	So

Defense

Pos.	#	Name	Class
DL	0	Ike Odimegwu (C)	Sr
DB	5	Alejandro Bello	Jr
DB	6	Brock Owen	Sr
DB	7	Kalyl Lindsey	Sr
LB	10	Max Malo (C)	Sr
LB	11	Tommy Dunn (C)	Sr
DB	12	Garrett Nichols	So
DB	13	Nas McLean	Jr
DB	14	Adam Vessel	Fr
DB	20	Miles Brophy	Sr
DB	21	Landon Heard	Sr
DB	23	Camryn Williams-Dalton	Sr
LB	25	Chris Rossetti	Jr
DB	26	Jeff Bandy	Jr
DB	27	Cap Davis	Sr
DB	28	Ian Browne	So
DB	29	Airiz Coleman Bey	So
DB	31	Wyatt Feltner	Sr
LB	32	Stefano Montella	Sr
DB	34	Efe Elaiho	So
DB	34	Chase Judge	So
DB	35	Landan Blue	Fr
DB	36	Luke Weltens	Jr
OLB	39	Will Chen	Fr
DL	40	Nathan Marsh	Jr
DB	42	Deke Carpenter	Fr
OLB	43	Carter Vaughn	So
LB	44	Hayes Beaver	Fr
LB	45	Nathan Kunickis	Jr
DB	46	Travis Wilson	Fr
OLB	47	Jackson Skinner	Fr
DB	48	Mack Mrowka	Fr
DL	50	EJ Perez	So
LB	51	Evan Tarozzi	So
DL	53	Maximilian Ciovacco	Sr
DL	54	Brody Borrevik	Fr
ILB	55	Jack Morse	So
DL	56	Nolan Daly	So
LB	57	Sam Kelley	Fr
LB	58	Gavin Jones	Fr
LB	59	Bertram Hawk Okpokwasili IV	So
LB	61	Tegan Jones	Fr
DL	62	John Luke Minner	Fr
LB	65	Jonathan Kim	Fr
DE	66	Will Schmitz	Jr
DL	90	Caden Harman	5th
DE	91	Jack Middleton	Jr
DL	92	Mitch Mooney	So
DL	93	Caleb White	Fr
DL	94	Liam Fitzgerald	Jr
DL	95	Nick Chao	So
DL	96	Mason Baldic	Jr
DL	97	Nate Hohlfeld	So
DE	98	Miles Gaito	Fr
DL	99	Michael Reddick	Sr

Special teams

Pos.	#	Name	Class
P	33	Malcolm Flynn	Jr
K	37	Drew Crabtree	So
LS	49	Michael Pedrotti	Jr

Head coach

- James Perry

Coordinators/assistant coaches

- Dan Mulrooney – Associate head coach / defensive coordinator
- Willie Edwards – Assistant head coach, running backs
- Eddy Morrissey – Assistant coach, offensive line / run game coordinator
- Patrick Murphy – Assistant coach, tight ends / special teams coordinator
- Mitchell Jonke – Assistant coach, quarterbacks / recruiting coordinator
- Andrew DiRienzo – Assistant coach, wide receivers
- Phil DeCapito – Defensive run game coordinator / defensive line
- Bryan Murray – Assistant coach, outside linebackers
- Darryl Jackson – Special teams coordinator / assistant coach, defensive backs
- Nathan Wiggins – Offensive quality control assistant
- Sam Casey – Defensive quality control assistant

Legend

- (C) Team captain
- (S) Suspended
- (I) Ineligible
- Injured
- Redshirt

Roster
Last update: 2026-10-22
