= James Perry (American football) =

American football player and coach

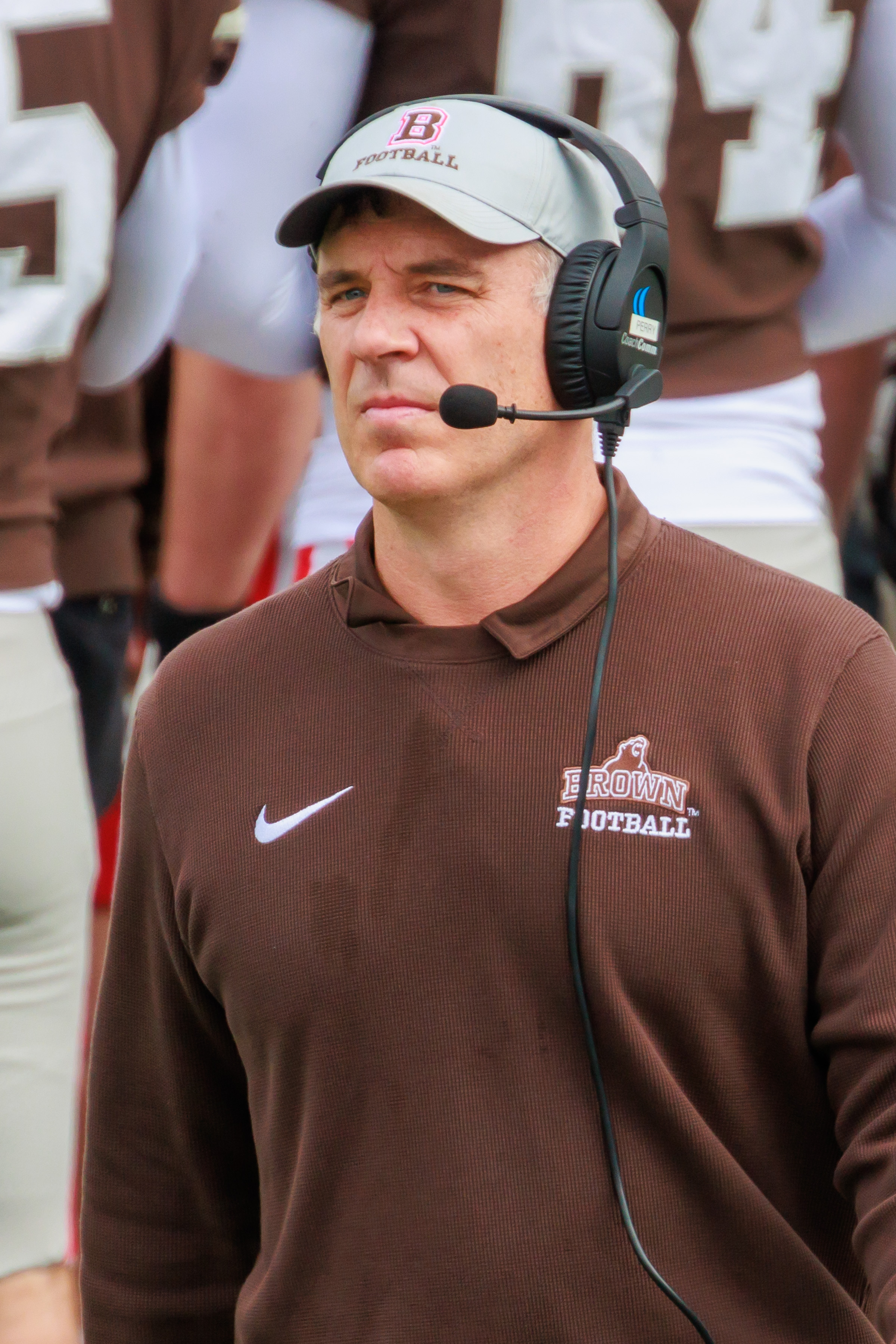
- Perry in 2024

Current position
- Title: Head coach
- Team: Brown
- Conference: Ivy League
- Record: 23–43

Playing career
- 1996–1999: Brown
- Position: Quarterback

Coaching career (HC unless noted)
- 2001: Dartmouth (assistant QB/WR)
- 2002–2003: Williams (QB/RC)
- 2004–2005: Maryland (GA)
- 2006: Delaware (RB)
- 2007–2009: Brown (QB/RC)
- 2010–2016: Princeton (OC)
- 2017–2018: Bryant
- 2019–present: Brown

Head coaching record
- Overall: 35–53

James Perry is an American football coach and former player. He is the head football coach at his alma mater, Brown University, where he was a starting quarterback in the late 1990s.

== Biography ==
Perry is the youngest of seven children by Massachusetts hall of fame track and field coach Ernest Perry Jr. While a student at Malden Catholic High School, Perry played football, basketball, and track, receiving the Phelps Scholar-Athlete Award in 1996. He played quarterback at Brown, earning a number of school and Ivy League passing records.

Perry served as the head coach at Bryant University from 2017 to 2018, where he posted a record of 12–10.

== Honors and awards ==
- Phelps Scholar-Athlete Award, 1996
- Ivy League Player of the Year, 1999
- Ivy League Bushnell Cup, 1999
- Brown Athletic Hall of Fame, 2016

== Head coaching record ==
Year	Team	Overall	Conference	Standing	Bowl/playoffs
Bryant Bulldogs (Northeast Conference) (2017–2018)
2017	Bryant	6–5	4–2	T–2nd	
2018	Bryant	6–5	2–4	T–5th	
Bryant:		12–10	6–6		
Brown Bears (Ivy League) (2019–present)
2019	Brown	2–8	1–6	8th	
2020–21	No team—COVID-19				
2021	Brown	2–8	1–6	T–6th	
2022	Brown	3–7	1–6	8th	
2023	Brown	5–5	3–4	T–5th	
2024	Brown	3–7	2–5	T–6th	
2025	Brown	5–5	2–5	T-6th	
2026	Brown	3–3	1–2		
Brown:		23–43	11–34		
Total:		35–53			

== Personal life ==
Perry is the uncle of E. J. Perry, who was also his quarterback at Brown from 2019 to 2021. His older brother is John Perry, who is also a football coach.
