= Concordia Academy (Minnesota) =

Location
- 2400 North Dale Street; Roseville, Minnesota 55113; United States; 45°00′45″N 93°07′27″W

Information
- Type: Private
- Motto: Honoring God Through Excellence
- Religious affiliation: Lutheran Church–Missouri Synod
- Established: 1893
- Principal: Jasmine Anderson
- Teaching staff: 17.3 (on an FTE basis)
- Enrollment: 228 (2018–2019)
- Student to teacher ratio: 13.2
- Colors: Green and White
- Athletics conference: Tri-Metro Conference
- Nickname: Beacons
- Rival: St. Agnes High School
- Website: www.concordiaacademy.com

Concordia Academy is a Christian high school (Grades 9–12) in Roseville, Minnesota, United States. Established in 1893, it is a Christian high school owned and operated by the Lutheran High School Association of St. Paul and affiliated with the Lutheran Church–Missouri Synod.

== History ==
Concordia Academy originated in 1893 as the high school portion of Concordia College (now University) in St. Paul, Minnesota. In 1967, the academy merged with St. Paul Lutheran High School, which had been founded in 1959. St. Paul Lutheran had occupied the building at 2400 North Dale Street in Roseville since 1962; that location became the site of the merged schools.

== Demographics ==
The demographic breakdown of the 228 students enrolled in 2015-2016 was:

- Asian/Pacific islanders - 15.4%
- Black - 7.0%
- Hispanic - 5.7%
- White - 71.9%

== Notable alumni ==
- Janet Cobbs, volleyball coach and former player for Team USA in the 1992 Summer Olympics
- Ben Goodrich, American judoka and member of Team USA in the 2020 Summer Paralympics
- Andrew Aurich, head coach for the Harvard Crimson
