= Andrew Aurich =

American football coach (born 1983)

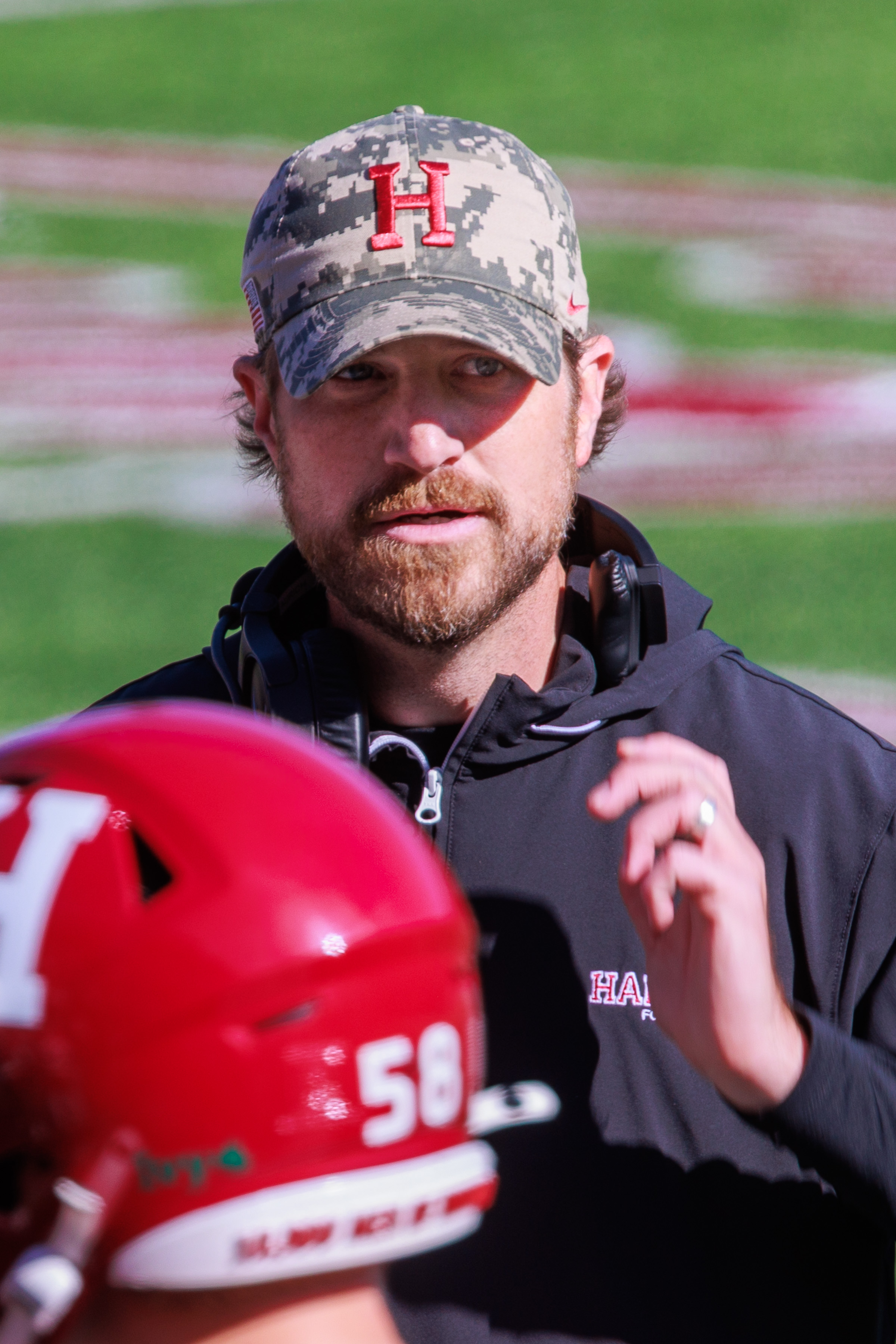
- Aurich in 2025

Current position
- Title: Head coach
- Team: Harvard
- Conference: Ivy League
- Record: 25–6

Biographical details
- Born: c. 1983 (age 42–43); St. Paul, Minnesota, U.S.

Playing career
- 2002–2005: Princeton
- 2006: Midwest Pioneers
- Positions: Offensive lineman, long snapper, tight end, fullback

Coaching career (HC unless noted)
- 2006: Concordia Academy (MN) (OL)
- 2007–2008: Albright (TE/OL)
- 2009: Rutgers (dir. of player dev.)
- 2010: Rutgers (def. assistant)
- 2011: Princeton (RB)
- 2012: Tampa Bay Buccaneers (def. assistant)
- 2013 (spring): Bucknell (OL)
- 2013–2015: Princeton (ST/TE)
- 2016: Princeton (OL)
- 2017–2018: Princeton (AHC/OL)
- 2019: Princeton (AHC/OC/OL)
- 2020–2021: Rutgers (OL)
- 2022: Rutgers (RB)
- 2023: Rutgers (TE)
- 2024–present: Harvard

Head coaching record
- Overall: 25–6
- Tournaments: 0–1 (NCAA D-I playoffs)

Accomplishments and honors

Championships
- 3 Ivy League (2024–2026)

Andrew Aurich (born c. 1983) is an American college football coach. He is the head football coach for Harvard University, a position he has held since 2024. Aurich won a share of the Ivy League title in his first two seasons as head coach, becoming the first Harvard coach to ever win an Ivy championship in his first season.

== Early life and playing career ==
Aurich was born in St. Paul, Minnesota. He graduated from Concordia Academy before attending Princeton University, where he played on the offensive line and as a long snapper for the Princeton Tigers. He was a two-year starter on the offensive line, with the Tigers finishing 5–5 in his junior year and 7–3 in his senior year. He graduated from Princeton with a degree in politics in 2006, where he wrote a senior thesis titled Minnesota Stadium Politics: A Study of Recent Stadium Successes. Aurich also played semi-professionally for the Midwest Pioneers of the Mid-America Football League (MAFL) as a tight end and fullback.

== Coaching career ==
After graduating from Princeton, Aurich returned to Concordia Academy, where he was an assistant coach for the 2006 season. He moved to Albright College as a tight ends coach for two years. Following two years at Rutgers and a year as a running backs coach at Princeton, Aurich spent a year as a defensive assistant for the Tampa Bay Buccaneers, working under defensive coordinator Bill Sheridan. After a year coaching the offensive line at Bucknell, Aurich returned to Princeton.

Aurich spent six years at Princeton, coaching special teams, tight ends, and the offensive line until became the assistant head coach in 2018. He spent the 2019 season as the offensive coordinator for the Tigers before leaving again for Rutgers, where he spent four years coaching across the offense.

=== Harvard ===
On February 8, 2024, The Harvard Crimson reported that Aurich, then a tight ends coach at Rutgers, would be the next head coach for the Harvard Crimson following the retirement of Tim Murphy. His selection was announced officially on February 12, 2024. In his first season as head coach Aurich led Harvard to a 5–2 Ivy League record and a share of the Ivy League championship with Columbia and Dartmouth. He became the first Harvard coach to win an Ivy championship in his first season.

In the 2025 season, Aurich led the Crimson to a 9–1 regular season record and was named a Finalist for the Eddie Robinson Coach of the Year Award.

Following a 45–28 loss to Yale in The Game, Harvard shared the Ivy League title for the third straight year in a row and the second under Aurich.

In the first year of Ivy participation in football post-season play, Aurich led the Crimson to an at-large berth to participate in the NCAA Division I FCS tournament.

== Personal life ==
Aurich is married to Michelle Aurich, a former forensic accountant and Philadelphia Eagles cheerleader. They have a daughter and two sons.

== Head coaching record ==
Year	Team	Overall	Conference	Standing	Bowl/playoffs	STATS^{#}	Coaches^{°}
Harvard Crimson (Ivy League) (2024–present)
2024	Harvard	8–2	5–2	T–1st		25	
2025	Harvard	9–2	6–1	T–1st	L NCAA Division I First Round	20	23
2026	Harvard	8–2	5–2	1st			
Harvard:		25–6	16–5				
Total:		25–6					
National championship Conference title Conference division title or championship game berth
