= Mickey Fein =

American football coach (born 1976)

Current position
- Title: Offensive coordinator, quarterbacks coach
- Team: Harvard
- Conference: Ivy League

Biographical details
- Born: July 22, 1976 (age 50)

Playing career

Football
- 1995–1998: Maine
- 2000: Albany Firebirds
- 2001: Norfolk Nighthawks

Basketball
- 1996–1998: Maine
- Positions: Quarterback (football); Forward (basketball)

Coaching career (HC unless noted)
- 1999–2000: Barnstable HS (OC)
- 2002: Maine (WR)
- 2003–2005: UT Martin (OC/QB)
- 2006–2007: Murray State (OC/QB)
- 2008: Lafayette (PGC/QB)
- 2009–2016: Lafayette (OC/QB/WR)
- 2017–2020: Harvard (PGC/WR)
- 2021–2023: Harvard (OC/WR)
- 2024–present: Harvard (AHC/OC/QB)

Mickey Fein (born July 22, 1976) is an American football coach who is the offensive coordinator and quarterbacks coach for the Harvard Crimson football team. He played college football for the Maine Black Bears and professionally for the Albany Firebirds of the Arena Football League and the Norfolk Nighthawks of AF2.

== Playing career ==
Fein grew up in Centerville, Massachusetts and attended Barnstable High School. He passed for over 2,800 yards and 28 touchdowns and was a three-time Old Colony League All-Star during his high school career. Fein was also a three-time All-Star in basketball and finished as the school's all-time leading scorer with 1,361 points. Fein was inducted into Barnstable High School's hall of fame in 2007.

Fein played college football and basketball at the University of Maine and became the Black Bears' starting quarterback during his sophomore season. He holds the school's single-game records with 522 passing yards and six touchdown passes. Fein passed for 7,856 yards and 66 touchdowns during his college career.

Fein had tryouts with the New England Patriots and Detroit Lions, but was not offered a contract by either team. He was a member of the Albany Firebirds of the Arena Football League during the 2000 season. Fein was the starting quarterback for the Norfolk Nighthawks of AF2 in 2001 before retiring.

== Coaching career ==
Fein began his coaching career at the Barnstable High School, where he served as the school's offensive coordinator for two years from 1999 to 2000. He returned to Maine as the Black Bears' wide receivers coach in 2002. After one season he was hired as the offensive coordinator and quarterbacks coach at UT Martin, making him one of the youngest coordinators in FCS at 26 years old. Fein was hired as the offensive coordinator at Murray State in 2006.

Fein left Murray State after two seasons to become the quarterbacks coach and passing game coordinator at Lafayette in 2008. He promoted to offensive coordinator after one season. Fein spent eight seasons as the Leopards' offensive coordinator and was named the interim head coach after head coach Frank Tavani retired at the end of the 2016 season.

Fein was hired as the passing game coordinator and wide receivers coach at Harvard in 2017. He was elevated to offensive coordinator in 2021. Following the retirement of Crimson head coach Tim Murphy, Fein was retained by new head coach Andrew Aurich and made assistant head coach and moved to quarterbacks coach.
