= Kieran Corr =

American football player (born 2005)

No. 29 – Harvard Crimson
- Position: Placekicker
- Class: Junior

Personal information
- Born: October 10, 2005 (age 21); Boston, Massachusetts, U.S.
- Listed height: 6 ft 3 in (1.91 m)
- Listed weight: 175 lb (79 kg)

Career information
- High school: Winchester (Winchester, Massachusetts)
- College: Harvard (2024–present)
- Stats at ESPN

Kieran Corr (born October 10, 2005) is an American college football kicker for the Harvard Crimson.

== Early life ==
Corr attended Winchester High School in Winchester, Massachusetts, where he played placekicker and punter for the Winchester Red and Black football team. He committed to play for Harvard football in July 2023. He held offers from multiple other schools, including Stanford, Duke, and Boston College. He was ranked the No. 1 kicking prospect in his class by Kohl's Kicking, and a three-star recruit by ESPN. Corr earned the first of two kicker selections to play in the 2024 Under Armour All-America Game, with a 65-yard field goal at the 2023 Kohl's National Scholarship Camp.
